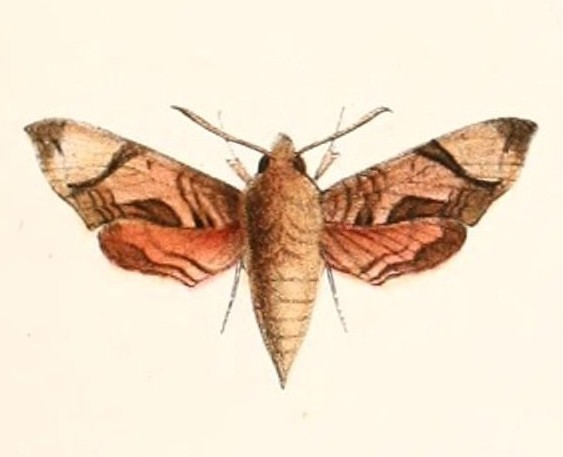

Scientific classification
- Kingdom: Animalia
- Phylum: Arthropoda
- Class: Insecta
- Order: Lepidoptera
- Family: Sphingidae
- Genus: Temnora
- Species: T. inornatum

Binomial name
- Temnora inornatum (Rothschild, 1894)

Synonyms
- Lophuron inornatum Rothschild, 1894

= Temnora inornatum =

Species of moth

Temnora inornatum is a moth of the family Sphingidae. It is known from South Africa.

The length of the forewings is about 26 mm. It is similar to Temnora nitida, but the broad oblique band on the forewing upperside is narrowed and angled. The forewing upperside has an oblique brown band. The hindwing upperside has a marginal band intermediate in intensity and definition between those of Temnora murina and Temnora nitida.
