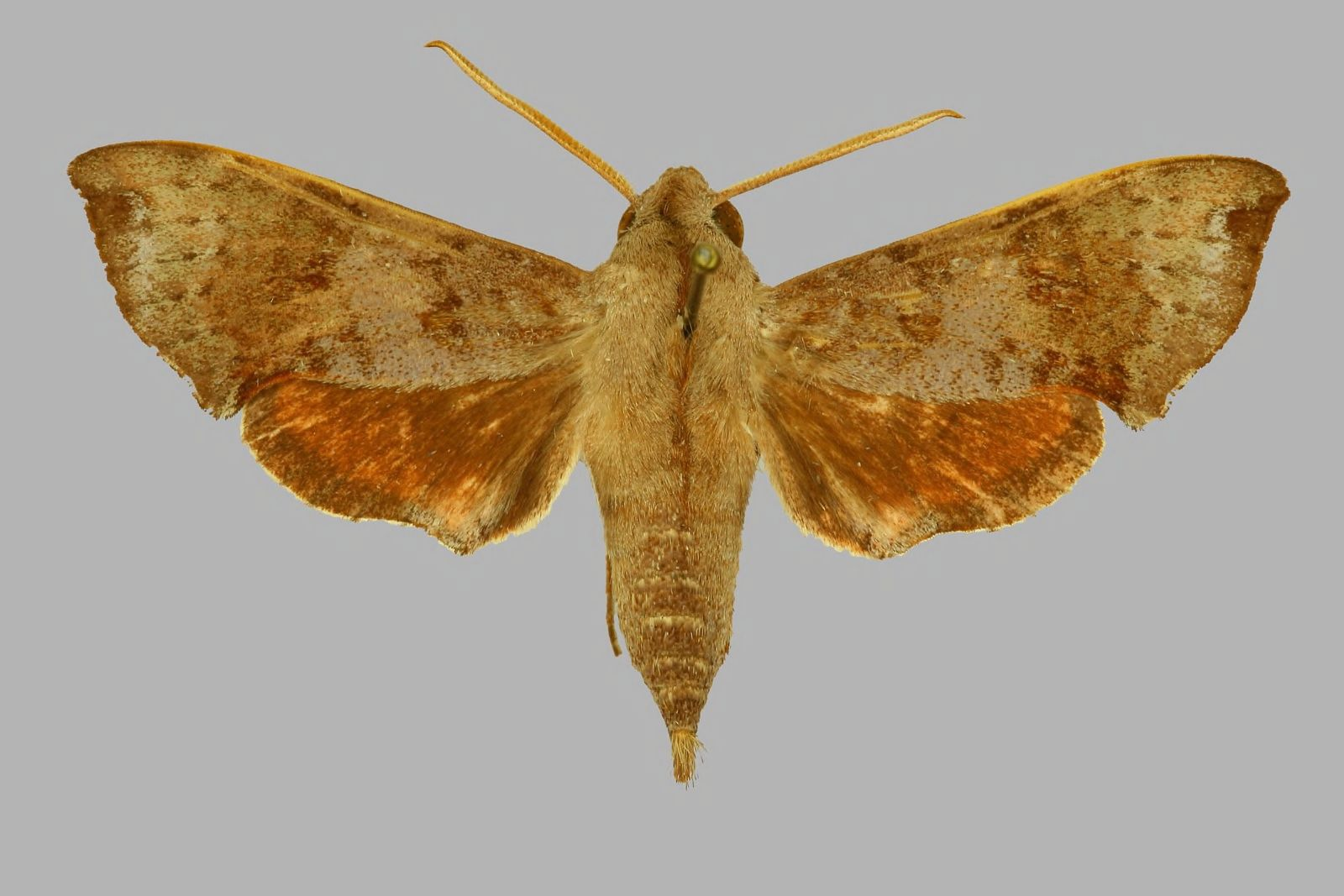

Scientific classification
- Kingdom: Animalia
- Phylum: Arthropoda
- Class: Insecta
- Order: Lepidoptera
- Family: Sphingidae
- Genus: Temnora
- Species: T. grandidieri

Binomial name
- Temnora grandidieri (Butler, 1879)

Synonyms
- Diodosida grandidieri Butler, 1879

= Temnora grandidieri =

Species of moth

Temnora grandidieri is a moth of the family Sphingidae. It is known from Madagascar.

It is very similar to Temnora murina, but distinguishable by the dark brown base of the hindwing upperside.
