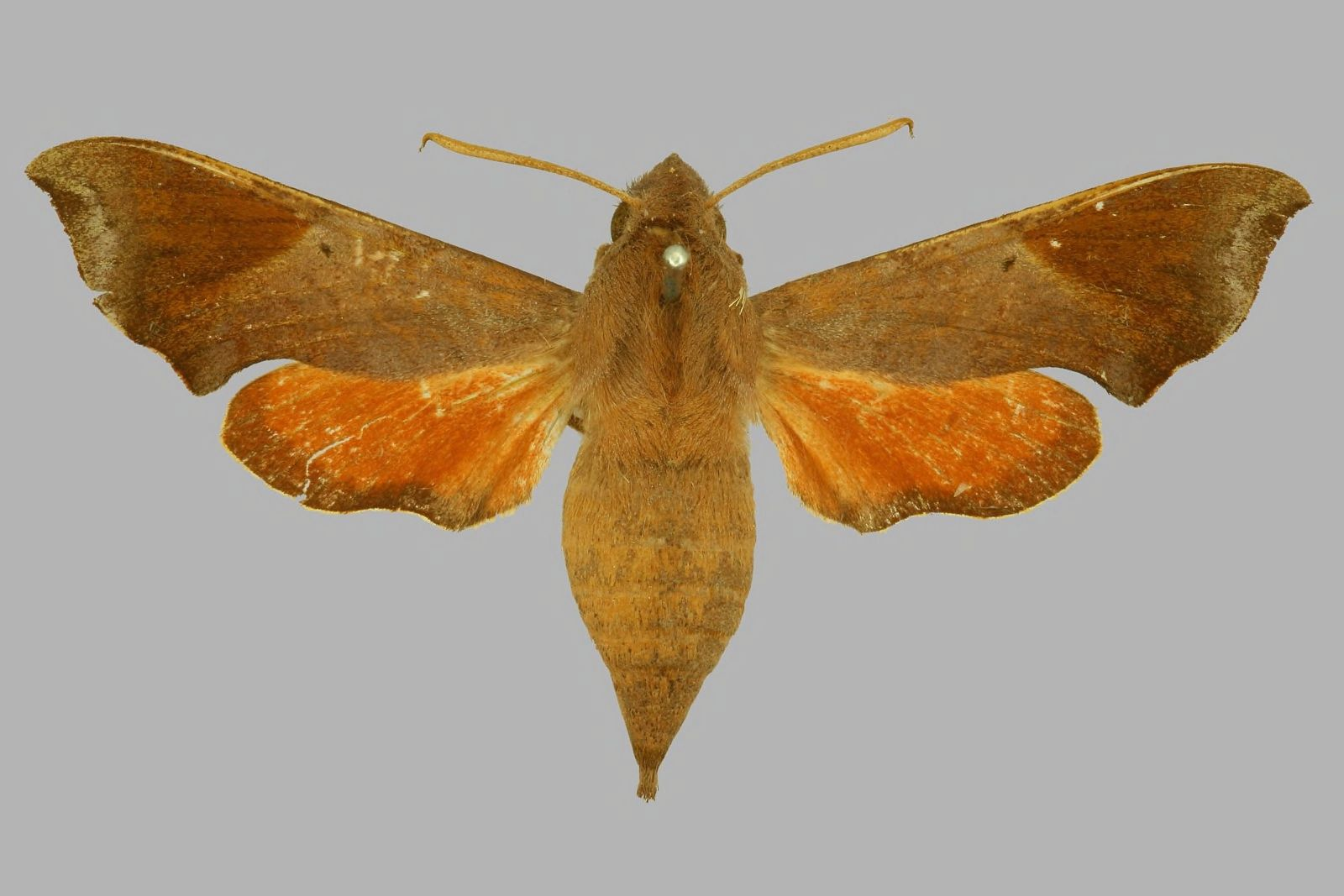

Scientific classification
- Kingdom: Animalia
- Phylum: Arthropoda
- Class: Insecta
- Order: Lepidoptera
- Family: Sphingidae
- Genus: Temnora
- Species: T. namaqua

Binomial name
- Temnora namaqua Rothschild & Jordan, 1903

= Temnora namaqua =

Species of moth

Temnora namaqua is a moth of the family Sphingidae. It is known from South Africa to Tanzania.

It is similar to Temnora nitida, but the oblique band is replaced by a dark brown triangular patch on the costa that is basally edged with a pale coloration. The forewing upperside of the females is similar to the males, but the pattern is very diffuse and the elements are difficult to discern.
