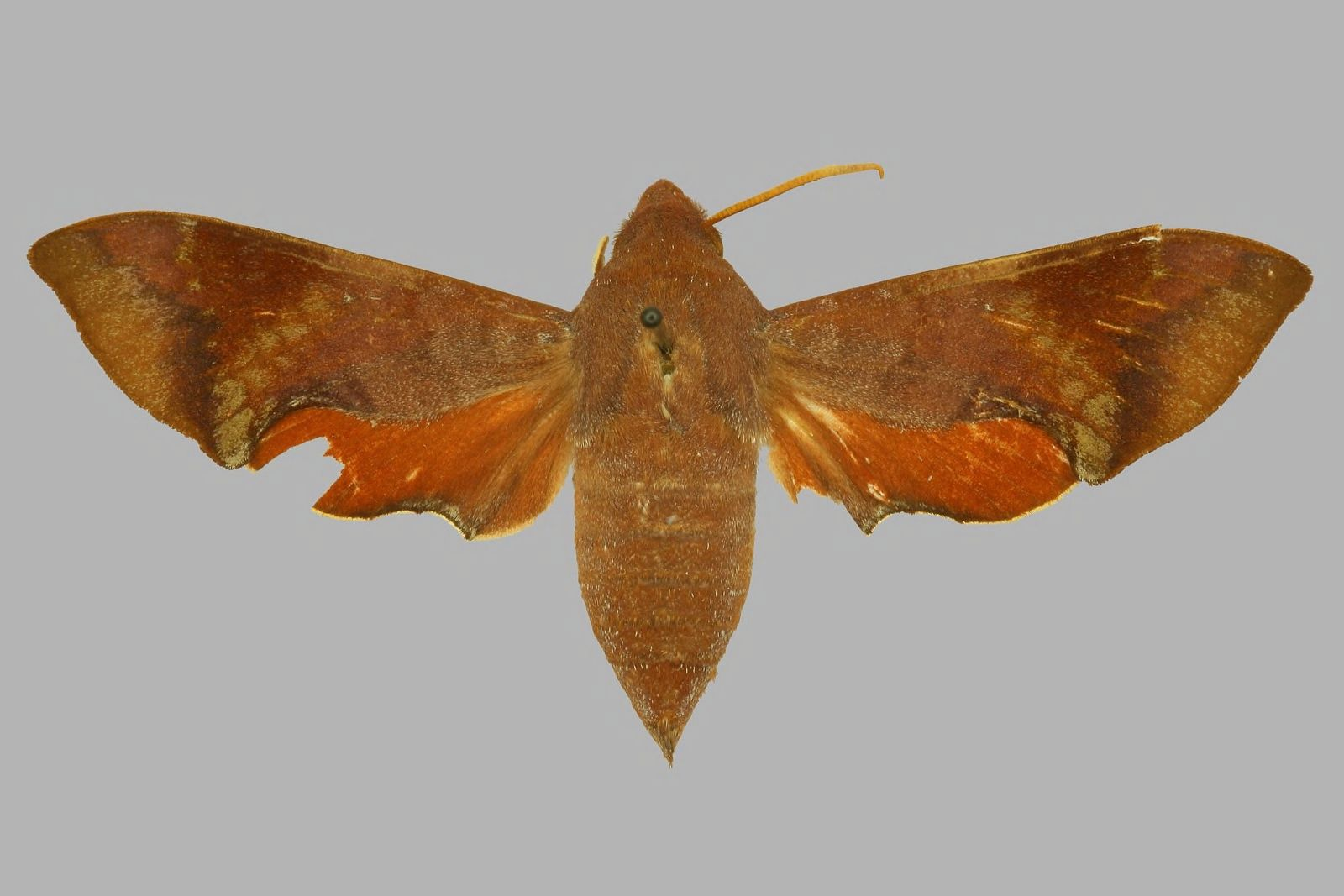

Scientific classification
- Kingdom: Animalia
- Phylum: Arthropoda
- Class: Insecta
- Order: Lepidoptera
- Family: Sphingidae
- Genus: Temnora
- Species: T. argyropeza

Binomial name
- Temnora argyropeza (Mabille, 1879)

Synonyms
- Chaerocampa argyropeza Mabille, 1879

= Temnora argyropeza =

Species of moth

Temnora argyropeza is a moth of the family Sphingidae. It is known from Madagascar.

It is very similar to Temnora marginata marginata, but the forewing upperside is lacking the pale oblique line. The hindwing upperside is entirely dark orange-brown, lacking a brown marginal band but thinly edged with blackish-brown.
