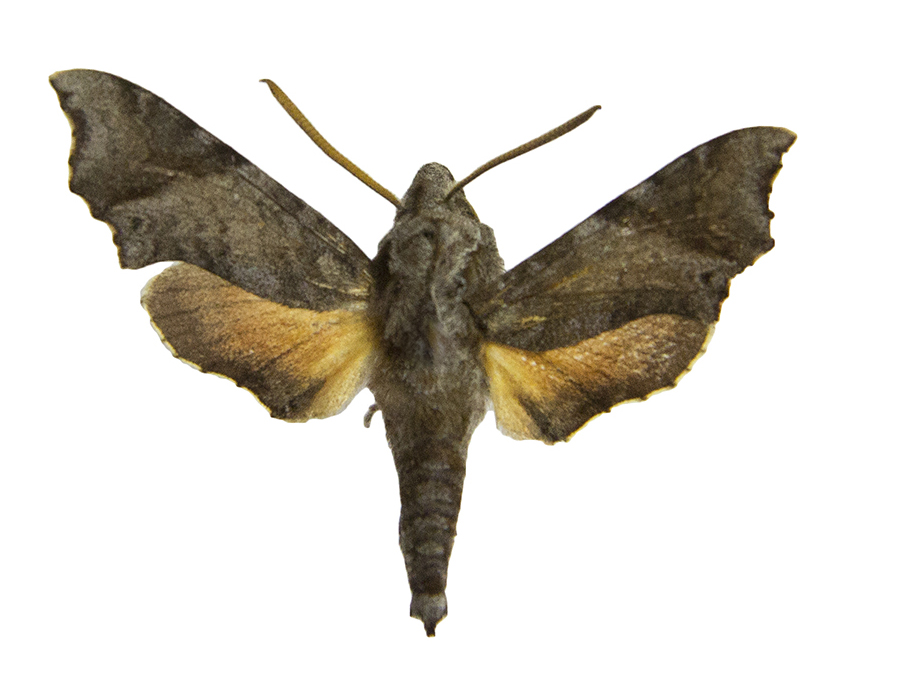

Scientific classification
- Kingdom: Animalia
- Phylum: Arthropoda
- Class: Insecta
- Order: Lepidoptera
- Family: Sphingidae
- Genus: Temnora
- Species: T. pylades

Binomial name
- Temnora pylades Rothschild & Jordan, 1903

Synonyms
- Temnora stevensoni Clark, 1926

= Temnora pylades =

Species of moth

Temnora pylades is a moth of the family Sphingidae. It is known from Uganda, Kenya, Tanzania and Malawi.

The forewings are similar to Temnora pylas pylas, but the apex is more acutely pointed and the tornus is more produced backwards. The hindwing costa is slightly dilated basally. The forewing upperside is also similar to Temnora pylas pylas but the centre of the antemedian band is not filled in with brown, the postmedian band is less well developed (appearing more like an oblique diffuse shade), the grey triangular area is bound by the costa and the postmedian band and submarginal line are smaller and less distinct. The hindwing upperside is also similar to Temnora pylades pylades, but the postmedian line is darker and often visible within the orange postmedian band.

== Subspecies ==
- Temnora pylades pylades
- Temnora pylades tanganyikae Clark, 1928 (Rwanda, Tanzania)
