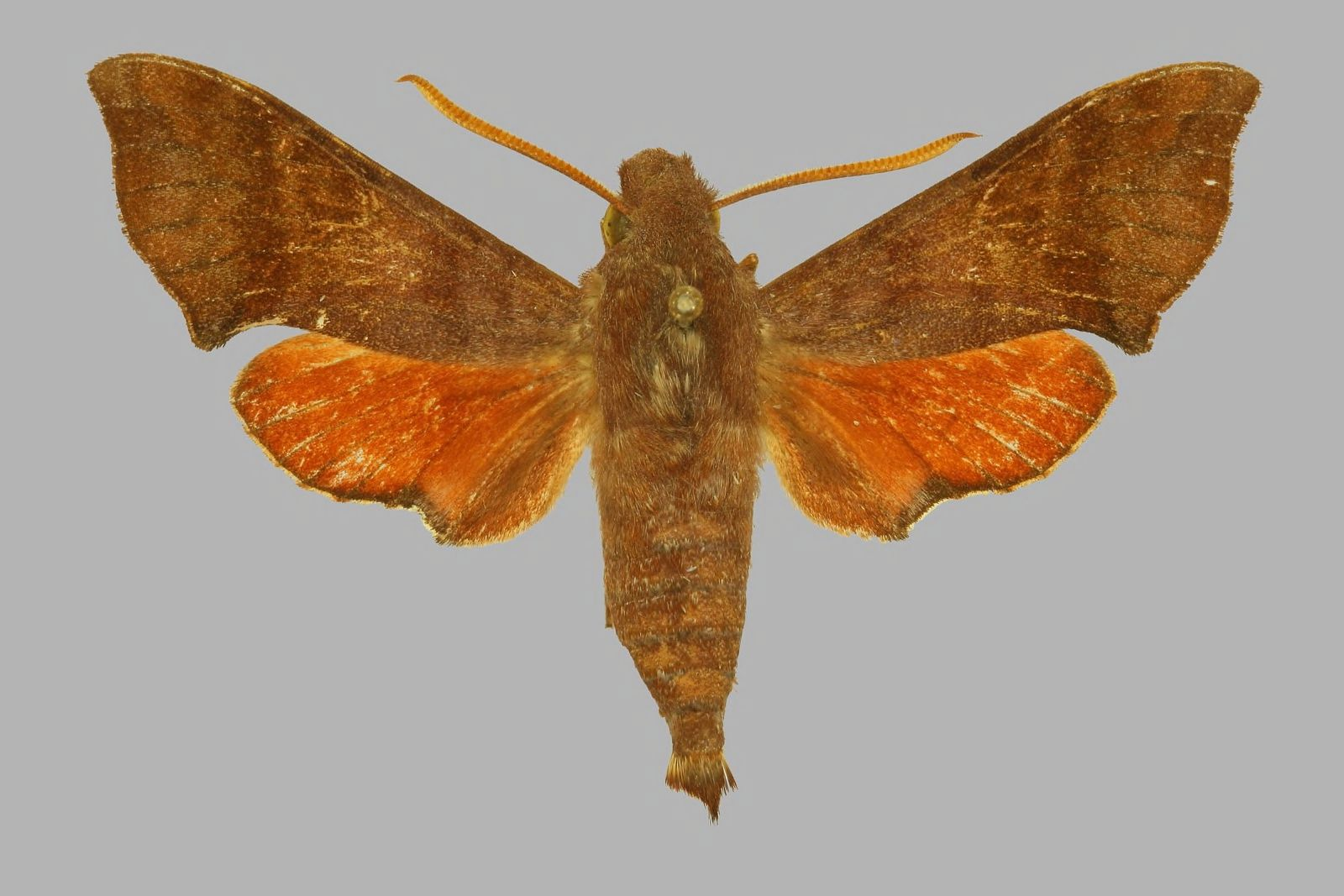

Scientific classification
- Kingdom: Animalia
- Phylum: Arthropoda
- Class: Insecta
- Order: Lepidoptera
- Family: Sphingidae
- Genus: Temnora
- Species: T. rungwe

Binomial name
- Temnora rungwe Darge, 2004

= Temnora rungwe =

Species of moth

Temnora rungwe is a moth of the family Sphingidae. It is known from Tanzania and Malawi.

It is very similar to Temnora burdoni, but the antennae are slightly shorter and the forewing outer margin is more strongly excavated below the apex and above the tornus.
