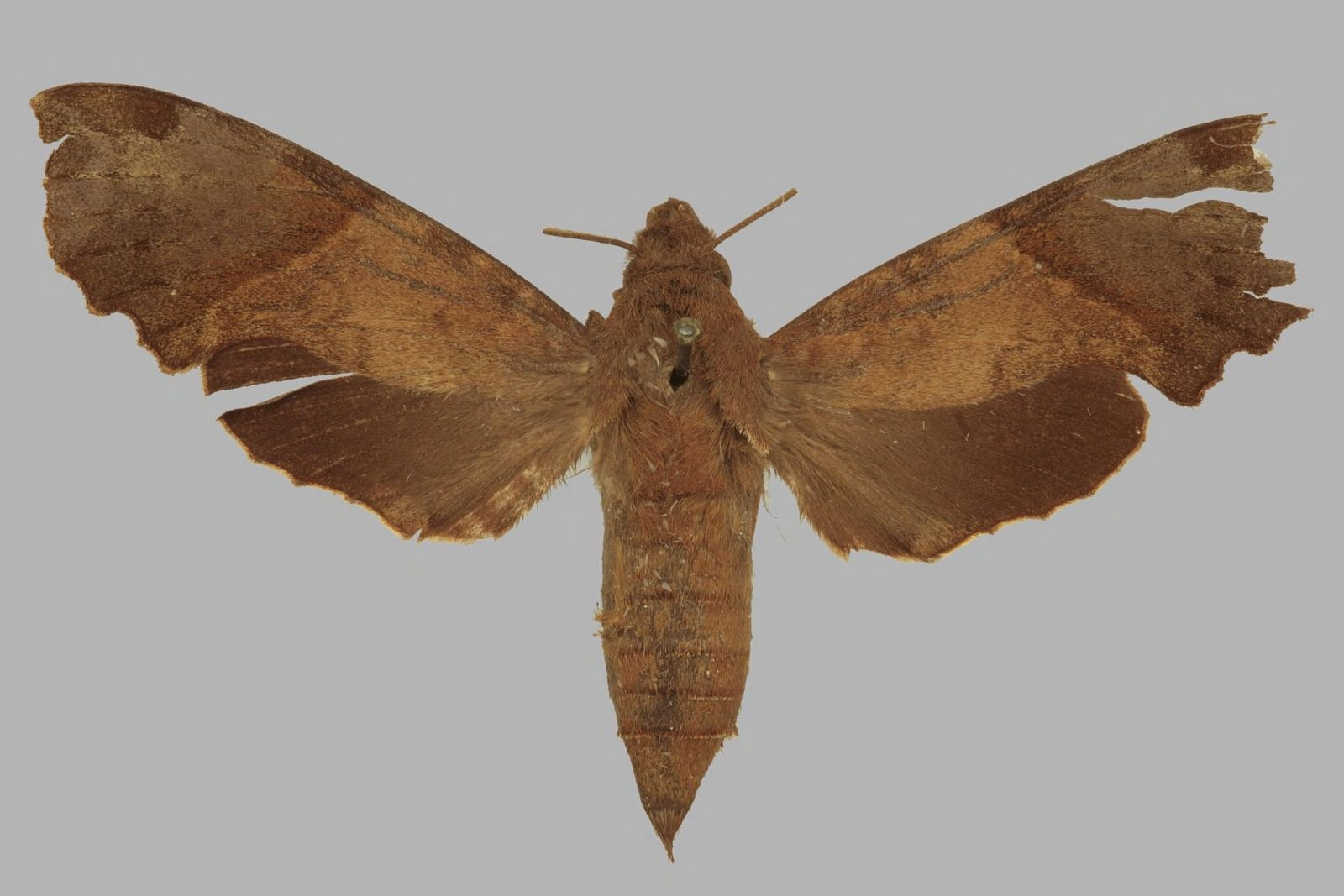

Scientific classification
- Kingdom: Animalia
- Phylum: Arthropoda
- Class: Insecta
- Order: Lepidoptera
- Family: Sphingidae
- Genus: Temnora
- Species: T. avinoffi

Binomial name
- Temnora avinoffi Clark, 1919

= Temnora avinoffi =

Species of moth

Temnora avinoffi is a moth of the family Sphingidae. It is known from Nigeria to Cameroon and Gabon.

The forewing upperside pattern is in general similar to Temnora subapicalis subapicalis in that the ground colour is dark brown and the straight oblique line runs from the middle of the costa and is edged basally with a pale coloration. It is however immediately distinguishable by the shape of the outer margin of the forewing, which is strongly convex and strongly crenulated. The forewing upperside has a purple flush distal of the oblique line. The forewing underside is black basally, light brown apically and the submarginal line is irregular. The hindwing upperside is black and unicolorous. The hindwing underside is light brown, with faint wavy dark brown median, postmedian and submarginal lines.

== Subspecies ==
- Temnora avinoffi avinoffi
- Temnora avinoffi biokoensis Darge, 1989 (Bioko)
