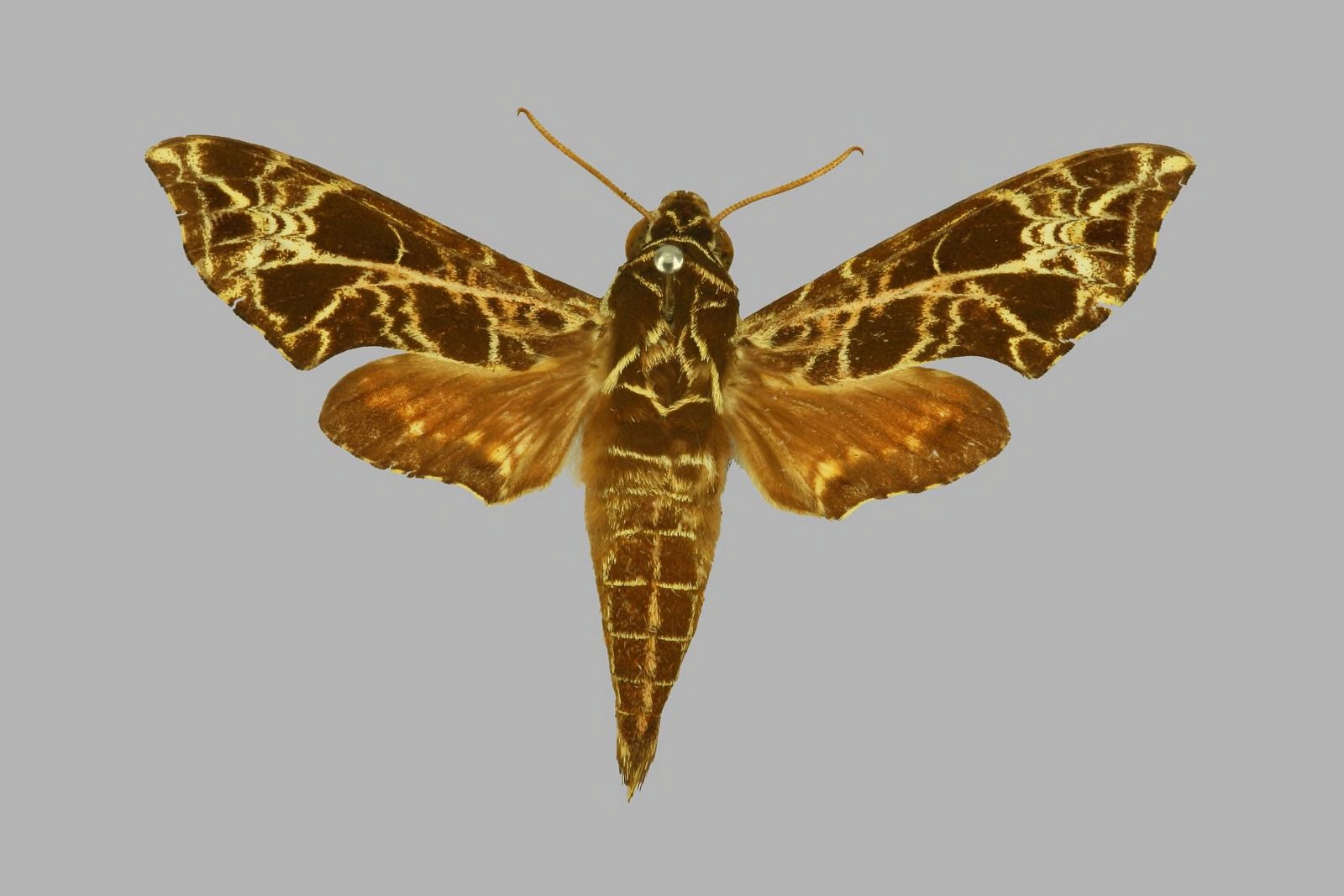

Scientific classification
- Kingdom: Animalia
- Phylum: Arthropoda
- Class: Insecta
- Order: Lepidoptera
- Family: Sphingidae
- Genus: Temnora
- Species: T. radiata

Binomial name
- Temnora radiata (Karsch, 1893)

Synonyms
- Ocyton radiata Karsch, 1893

= Temnora radiata =

Species of moth

Temnora radiata is a moth of the family Sphingidae. It is found from West Africa to Angola.

It is similar to Temnora mirabilis, but lacks the continuous, evenly curved pale postmedian line on the forewing upperside.
