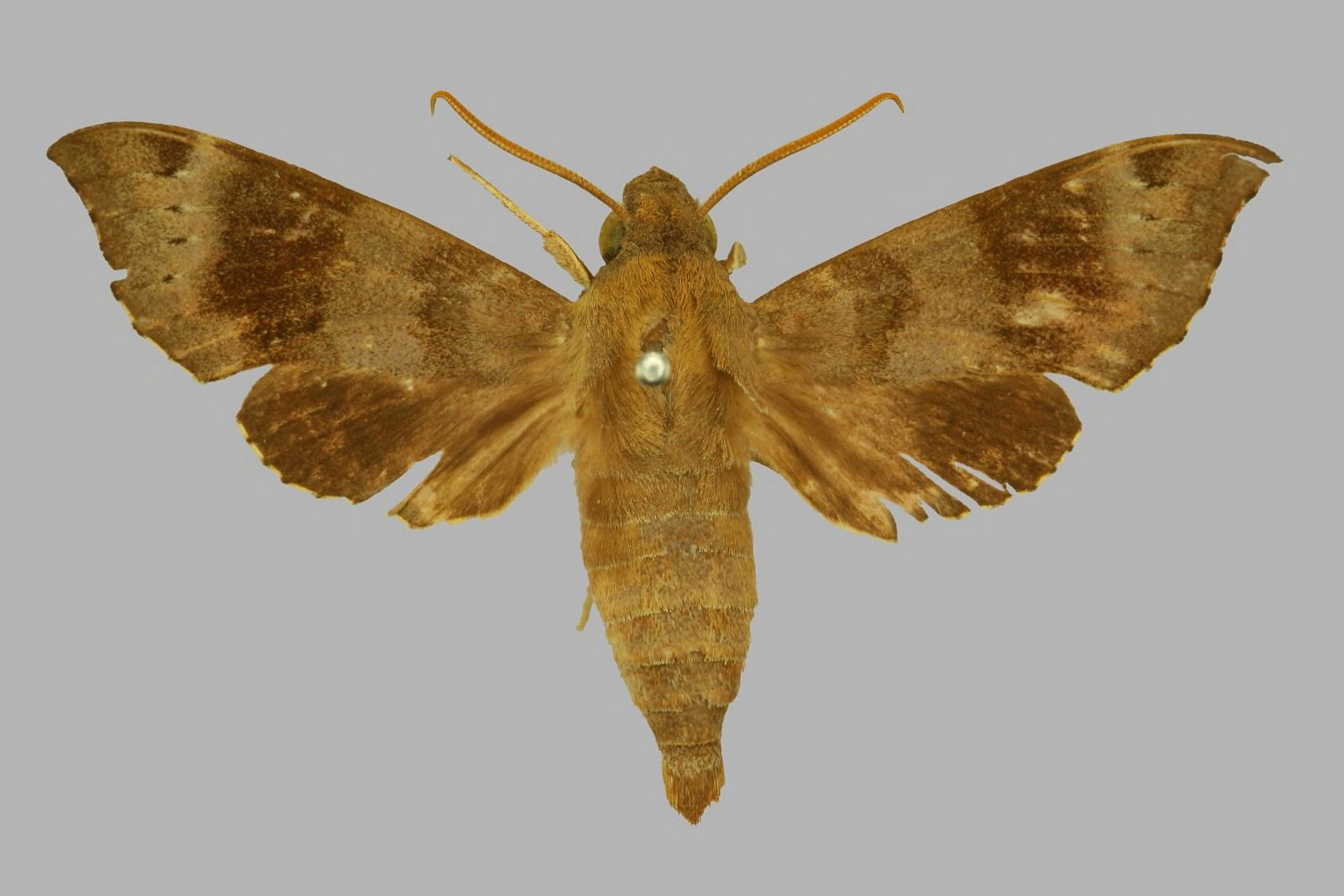

Scientific classification
- Kingdom: Animalia
- Phylum: Arthropoda
- Class: Insecta
- Order: Lepidoptera
- Family: Sphingidae
- Genus: Temnora
- Species: T. nephele

Binomial name
- Temnora nephele Clark, 1922

= Temnora nephele =

Species of moth

Temnora nephele is a moth of the family Sphingidae. It is known from Cameroon, Gabon, the Republic of the Congo and Nigeria.

The length of the forewings is about 21 mm for males and 23 mm for females. It is very similar to Temnora reutlingeri reutlingeri, but immediately distinguishable by the area between the median and postmedian lines on the forewing upperside filled in with dark brown, forming a conspicuous triangular or quadrangular patch. The oblique line on the forewing upperside is always absent.
