= Temnora hollandi =

Scientific classification
- Kingdom: Animalia
- Phylum: Arthropoda
- Class: Insecta
- Order: Lepidoptera
- Family: Sphingidae
- Genus: Temnora
- Species: T. hollandi

Binomial name
- Temnora hollandi Clark, 1920

Synonyms
- Temnora manengouba Darge, 1973

Species of moth

Temnora hollandi is a moth of the family Sphingidae. It is known from forests from Nigeria to Congo and Uganda.

The length of the forewings is about 27 mm, making it the largest Temnora species. It is similar to Temnora wollastoni, but much larger and the forewing outer margin is less crenulated. The forewing upperside is olive green, with a dark triangular patch on the costal margin. The distal part of the patch is a light blue area with two dark lines.
