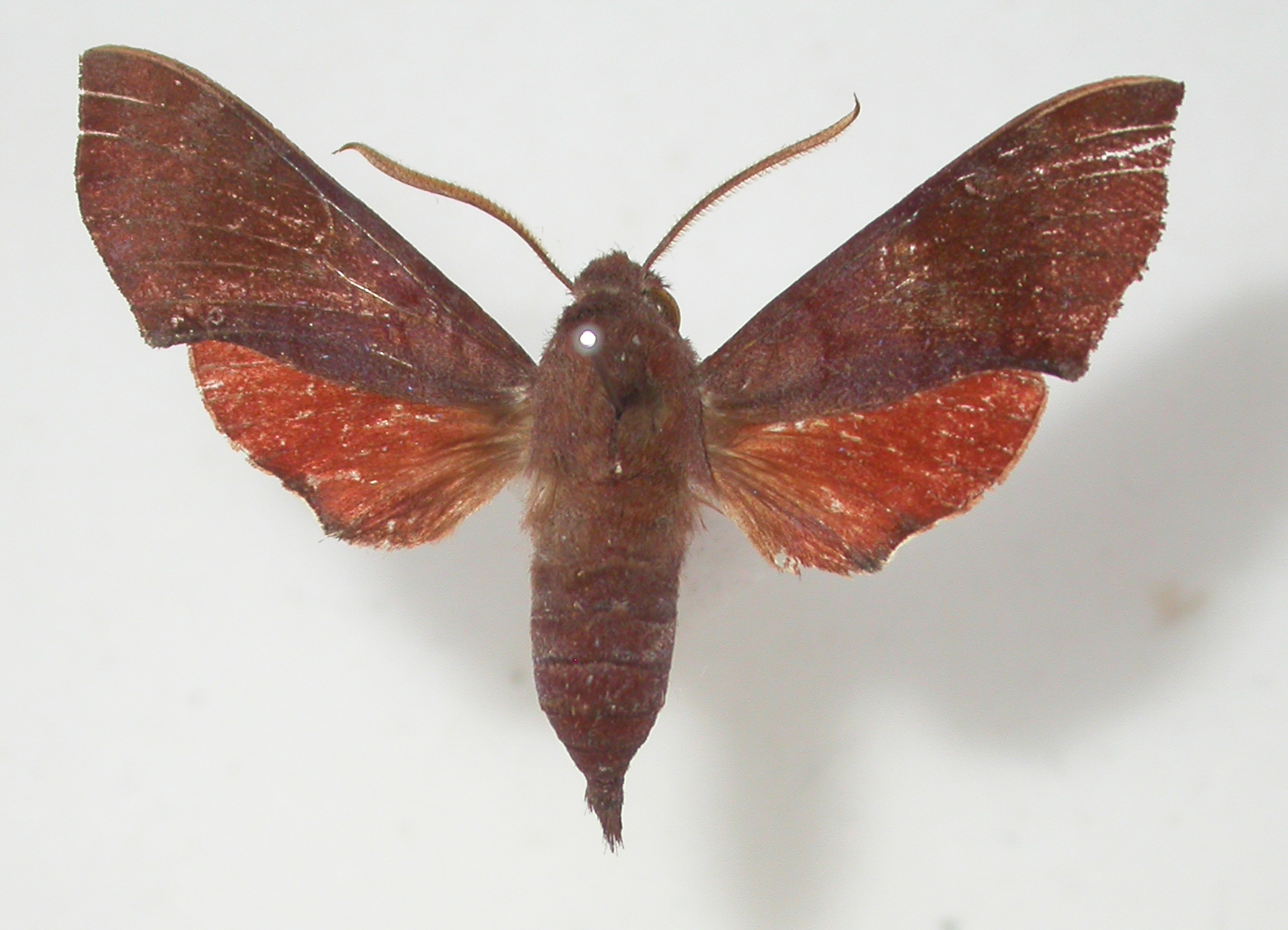

Scientific classification
- Kingdom: Animalia
- Phylum: Arthropoda
- Class: Insecta
- Order: Lepidoptera
- Family: Sphingidae
- Genus: Temnora
- Species: T. uluguru

Binomial name
- Temnora uluguru Darge, 2004

= Temnora uluguru =

Species of moth

Temnora uluguru is a moth of the family Sphingidae. It is known from Tanzania.
