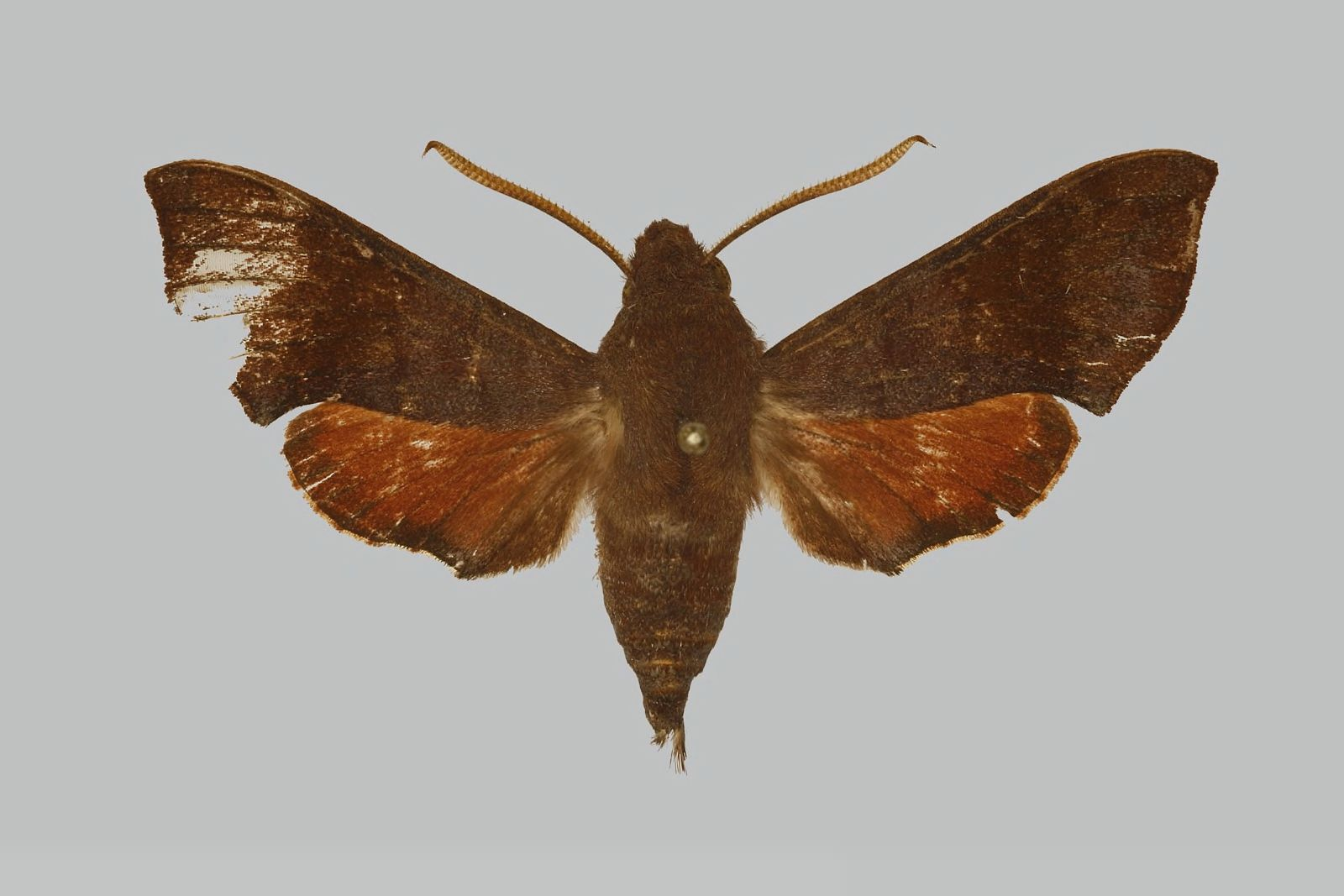

Scientific classification
- Kingdom: Animalia
- Phylum: Arthropoda
- Class: Insecta
- Order: Lepidoptera
- Family: Sphingidae
- Genus: Temnora
- Species: T. kaguru

Binomial name
- Temnora kaguru Darge, 2004

= Temnora kaguru =

Species of moth

Temnora kaguru is a moth of the family Sphingidae. It is known from Tanzania.

The wingspan is 37–45 mm.
