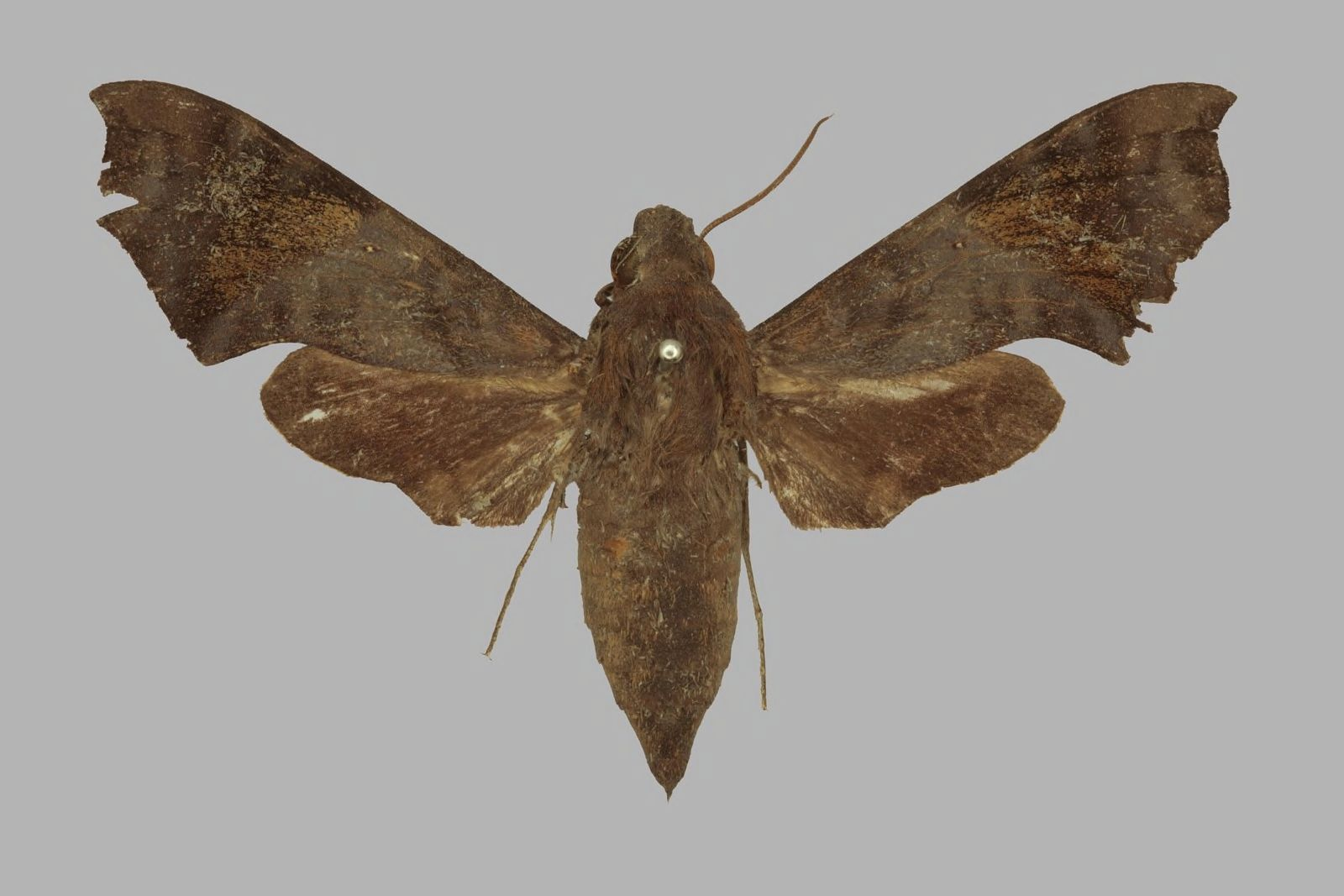

Scientific classification
- Kingdom: Animalia
- Phylum: Arthropoda
- Class: Insecta
- Order: Lepidoptera
- Family: Sphingidae
- Genus: Temnora
- Species: T. elisabethae

Binomial name
- Temnora elisabethae Hering, 1930

= Temnora elisabethae =

Species of moth

Temnora elisabethae is a moth of the family Sphingidae. It is known from forests from Congo to Uganda.

The length of the forewings is 21–24 mm.
