= Temnora masungai =

Scientific classification
- Kingdom: Animalia
- Phylum: Arthropoda
- Class: Insecta
- Order: Lepidoptera
- Family: Sphingidae
- Genus: Temnora
- Species: T. masungai

Binomial name
- Temnora masungai Darge, 2009

Species of moth

Temnora masungai is a moth of the family Sphingidae. It is known to inhabit the country of Tanzania.
