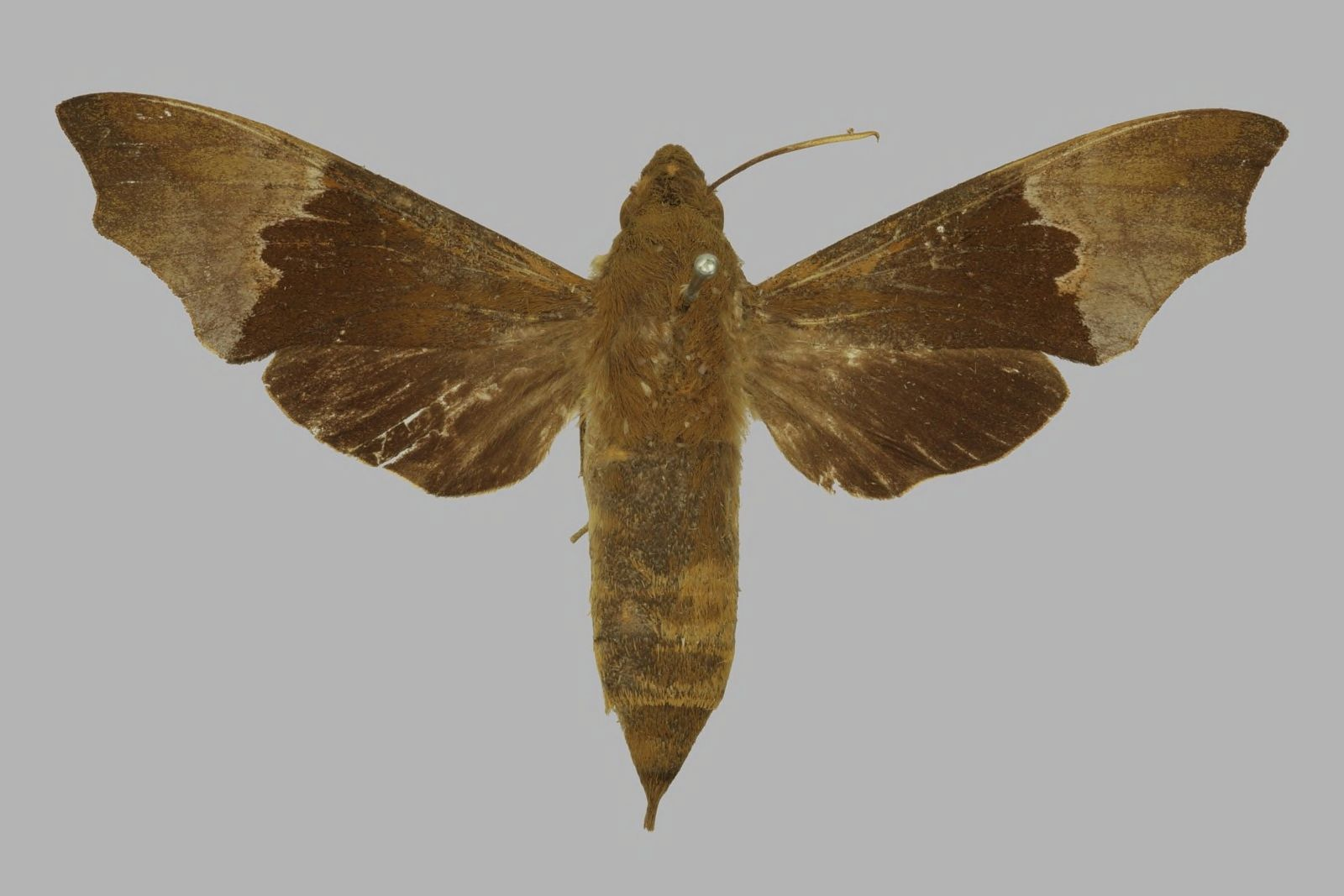

Scientific classification
- Kingdom: Animalia
- Phylum: Arthropoda
- Class: Insecta
- Order: Lepidoptera
- Family: Sphingidae
- Genus: Temnora
- Species: T. angulosa

Binomial name
- Temnora angulosa Rothschild & Jordan, 1906

Synonyms
- Temnora bicolor Gehlen, 1951

= Temnora angulosa =

Species of moth

Temnora angulosa is a moth of the family Sphingidae. It is known from Nigeria to Congo.

The length of the forewings is about 32 mm. It is an unmistakable species. The forewing outer margin is straight except for a bluntly triangular projection. The forewing upperside is distinctly bicoloured, dark brown basally and grey-brown distally, these areas divided by a distinct irregular line running from the middle of the costa to the tornus.
