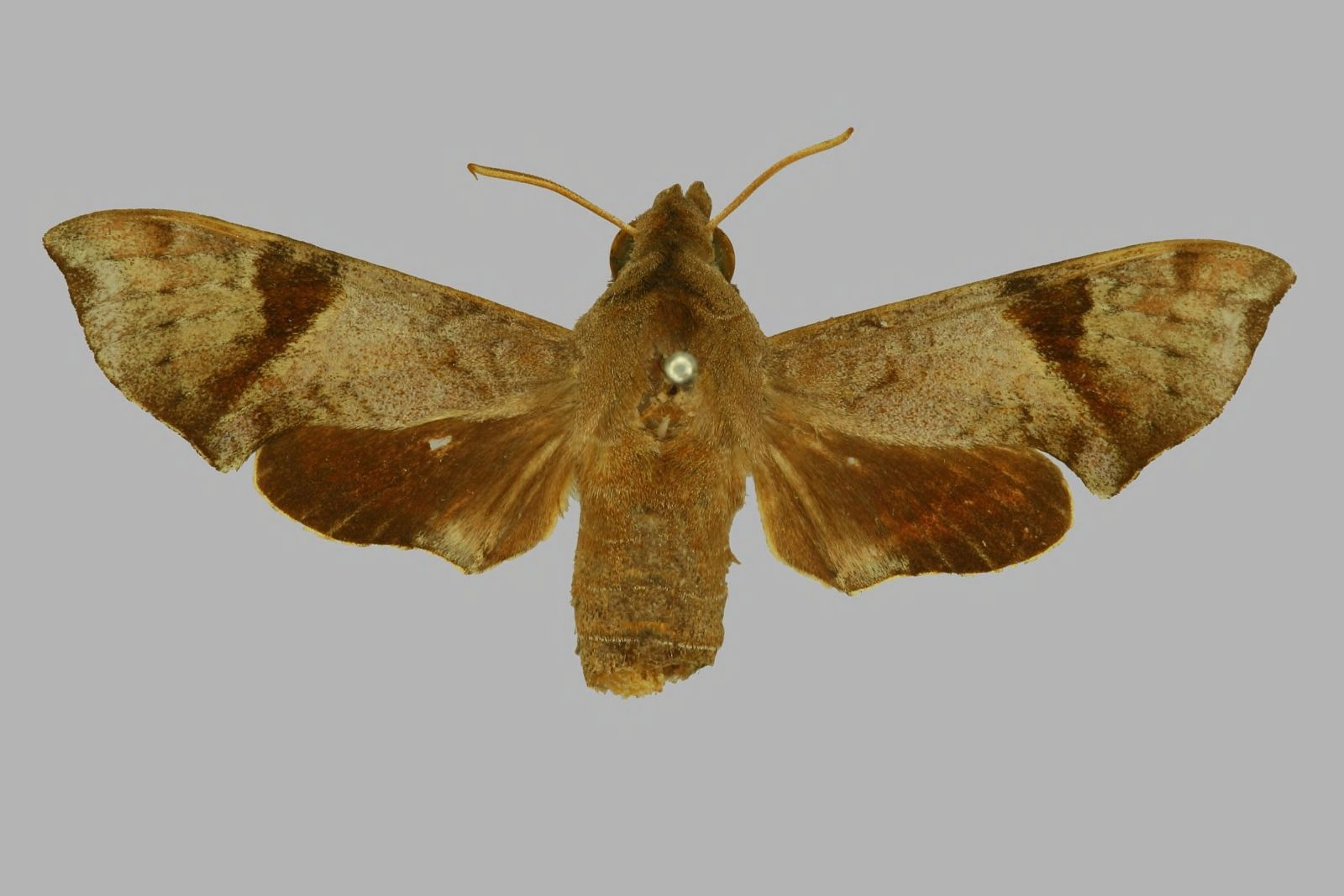

Scientific classification
- Kingdom: Animalia
- Phylum: Arthropoda
- Class: Insecta
- Order: Lepidoptera
- Family: Sphingidae
- Genus: Temnora
- Species: T. robertsoni

Binomial name
- Temnora robertsoni Carcasson, 1968

= Temnora robertsoni =

Species of moth

Temnora robertsoni is a moth of the family Sphingidae. It is known from Tanzania and Mozambique.

The length of the forewings is about 23 mm.
