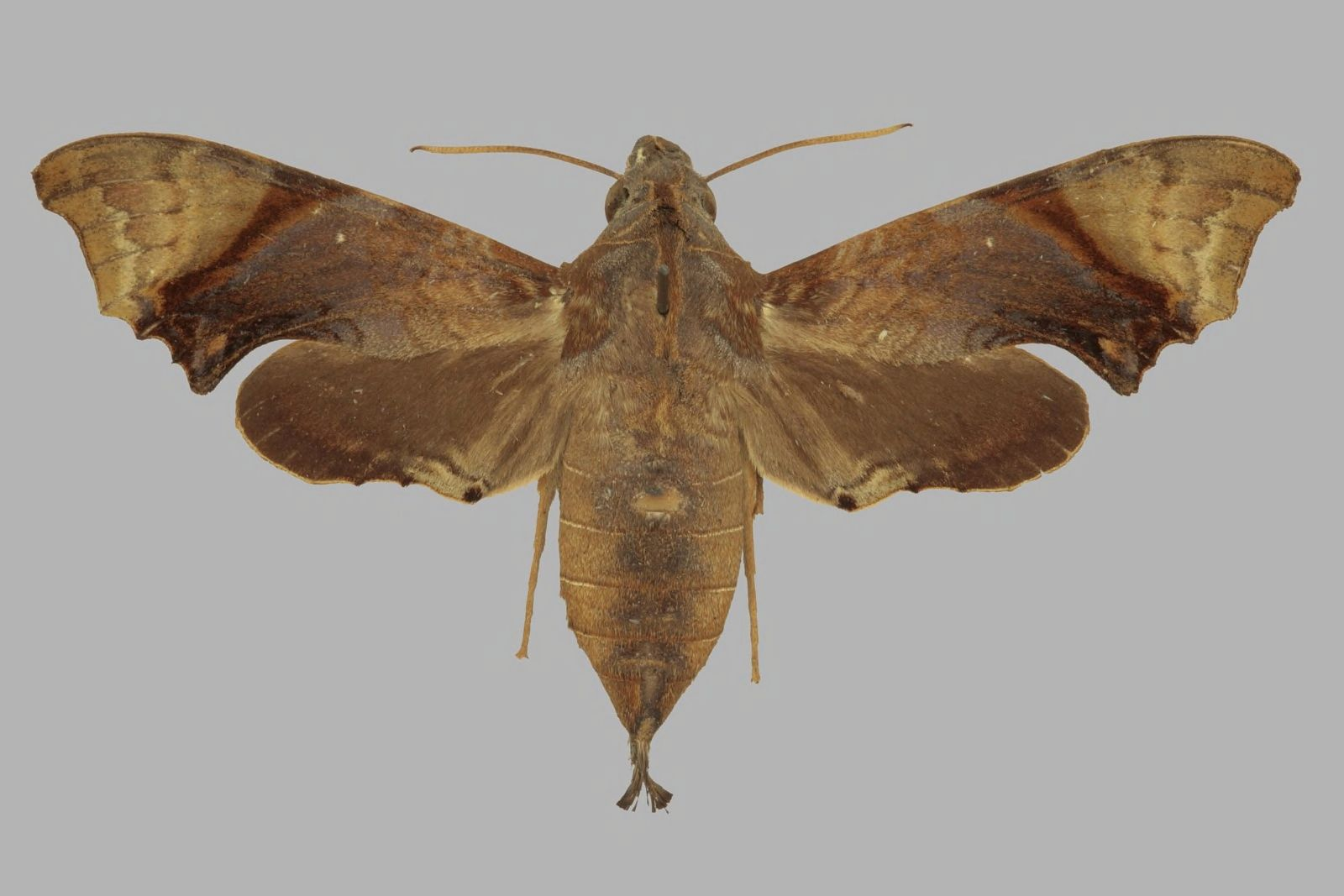

Scientific classification
- Kingdom: Animalia
- Phylum: Arthropoda
- Class: Insecta
- Order: Lepidoptera
- Family: Sphingidae
- Genus: Temnora
- Species: T. palpalis

Binomial name
- Temnora palpalis Rothschild & Jordan, 1903

= Temnora palpalis =

Species of moth

Temnora palpalis is a moth of the family Sphingidae. It is known from Madagascar.

It is similar to Temnora crenulata crenulata, but the upperside ground colour is more brownish. The forewing apex is rounded and the outer margin is convex apically and crenulated towards the tornus. The forewing upperside has an oblique band running from the costa to the middle of the outer margin. This band is widened at the costal margin. There is no pale distal border.
