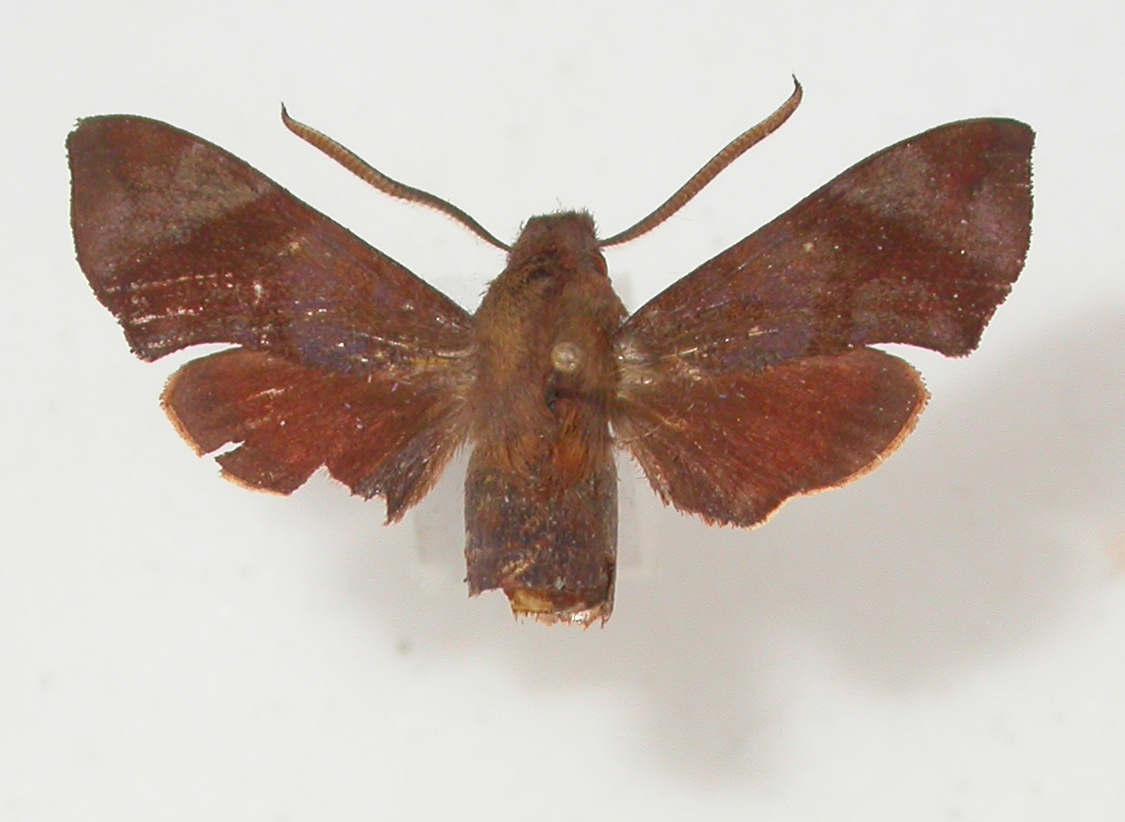

Scientific classification
- Kingdom: Animalia
- Phylum: Arthropoda
- Clade: Pancrustacea
- Class: Insecta
- Order: Lepidoptera
- Family: Sphingidae
- Genus: Temnora
- Species: T. dierli

Binomial name
- Temnora dierli Cadiou, 1997

= Temnora dierli =

Species of moth

Temnora dierli is a moth of the family Sphingidae. It is known from Tanzania.

The length of the forewings is about 18 mm. The antenna extremely long, much exceeding the discal spot. This is the longest antenna relative to forewing length of any Temnora species. The forewings are relatively short.
