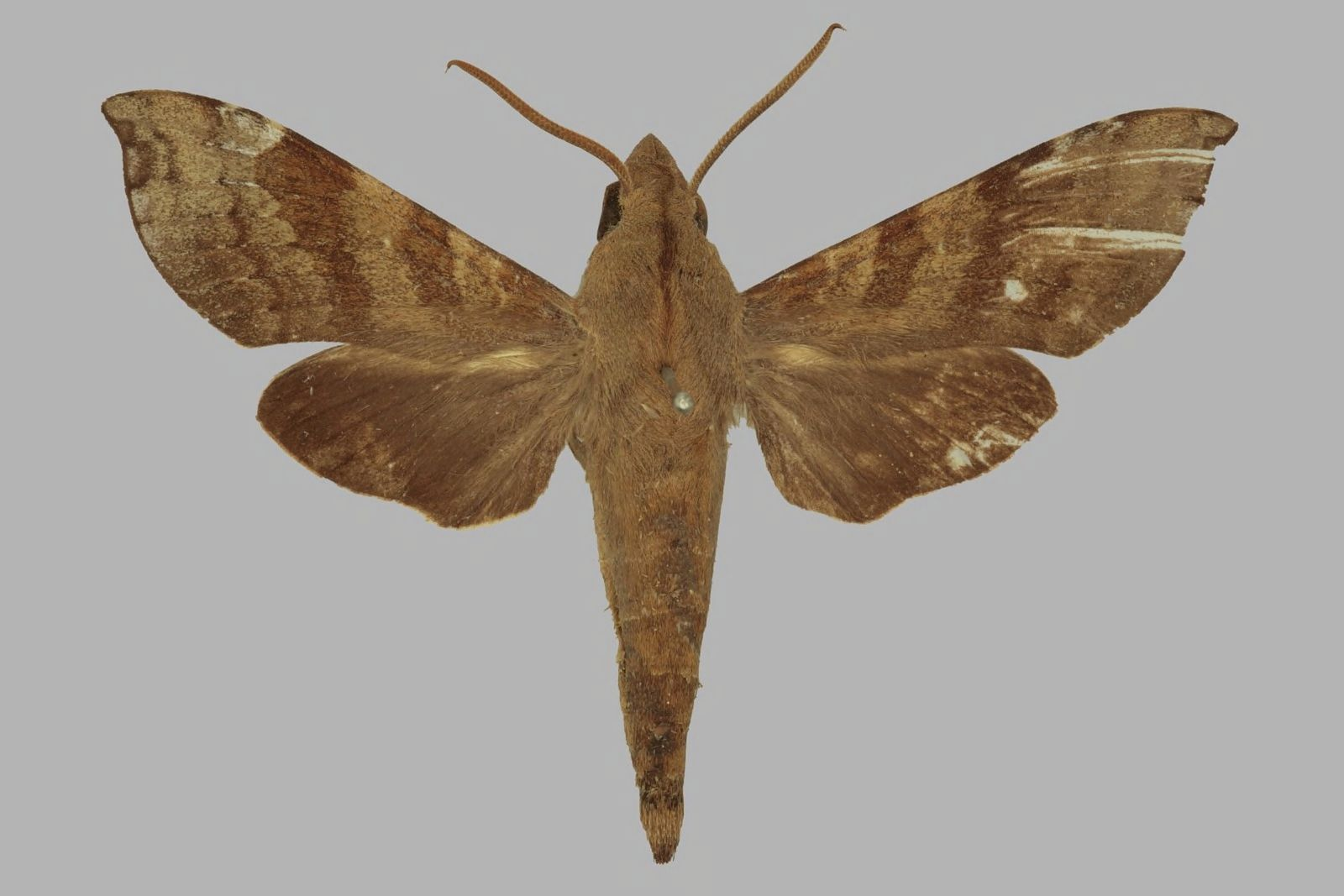

Scientific classification
- Kingdom: Animalia
- Phylum: Arthropoda
- Class: Insecta
- Order: Lepidoptera
- Family: Sphingidae
- Genus: Temnora
- Species: T. peckoveri

Binomial name
- Temnora peckoveri (Butler, 1876)

Synonyms
- Diodosida peckoveri Butler, 1876

= Temnora peckoveri =

Species of moth

Temnora peckoveri is a moth of the family Sphingidae. It is known from Madagascar.
