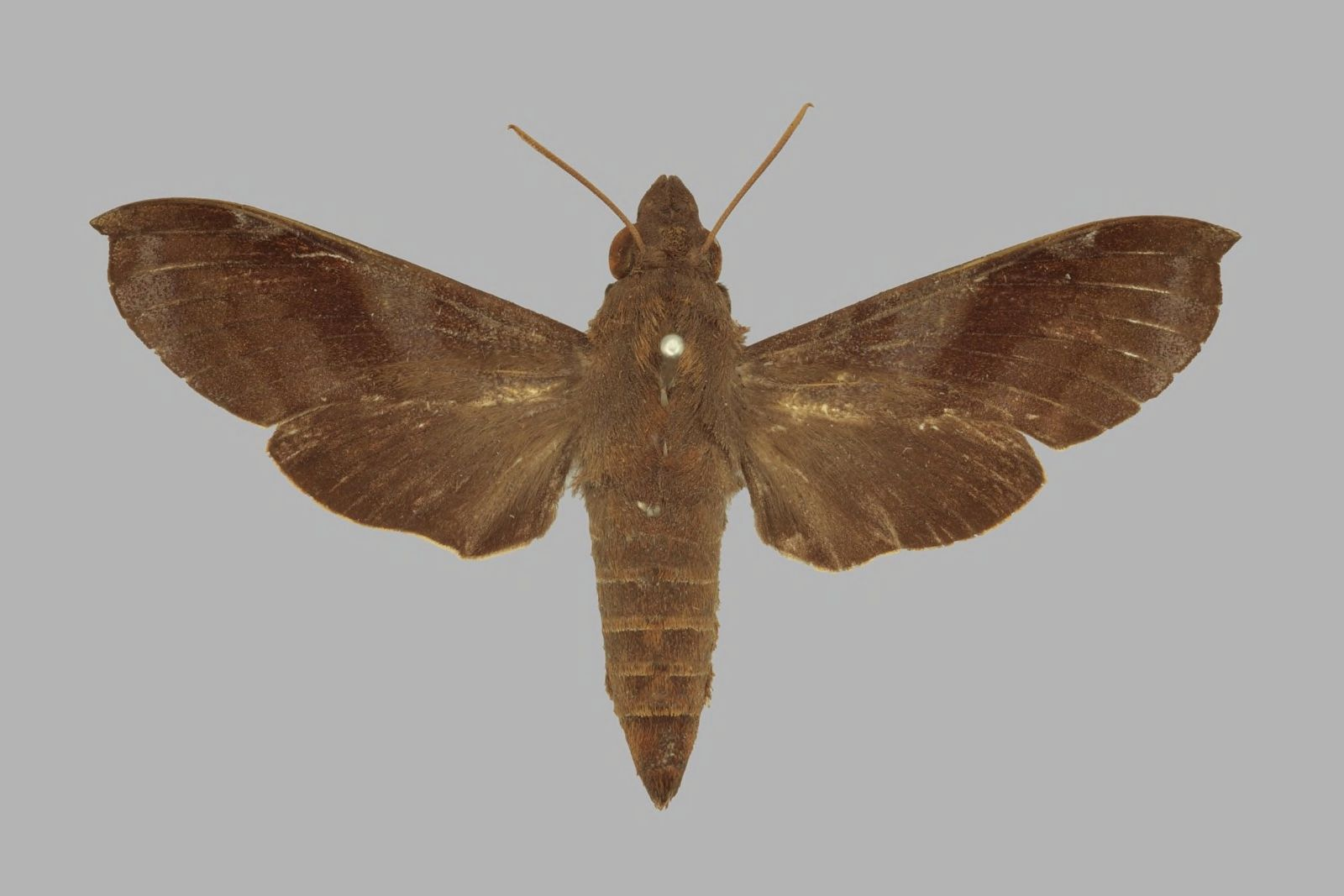

Scientific classification
- Kingdom: Animalia
- Phylum: Arthropoda
- Class: Insecta
- Order: Lepidoptera
- Family: Sphingidae
- Genus: Temnora
- Species: T. leighi

Binomial name
- Temnora leighi Rothschild & Jordan, 1915

= Temnora leighi =

Species of moth

Temnora leighi is a moth of the family Sphingidae. It is known from the Comoro Islands.
