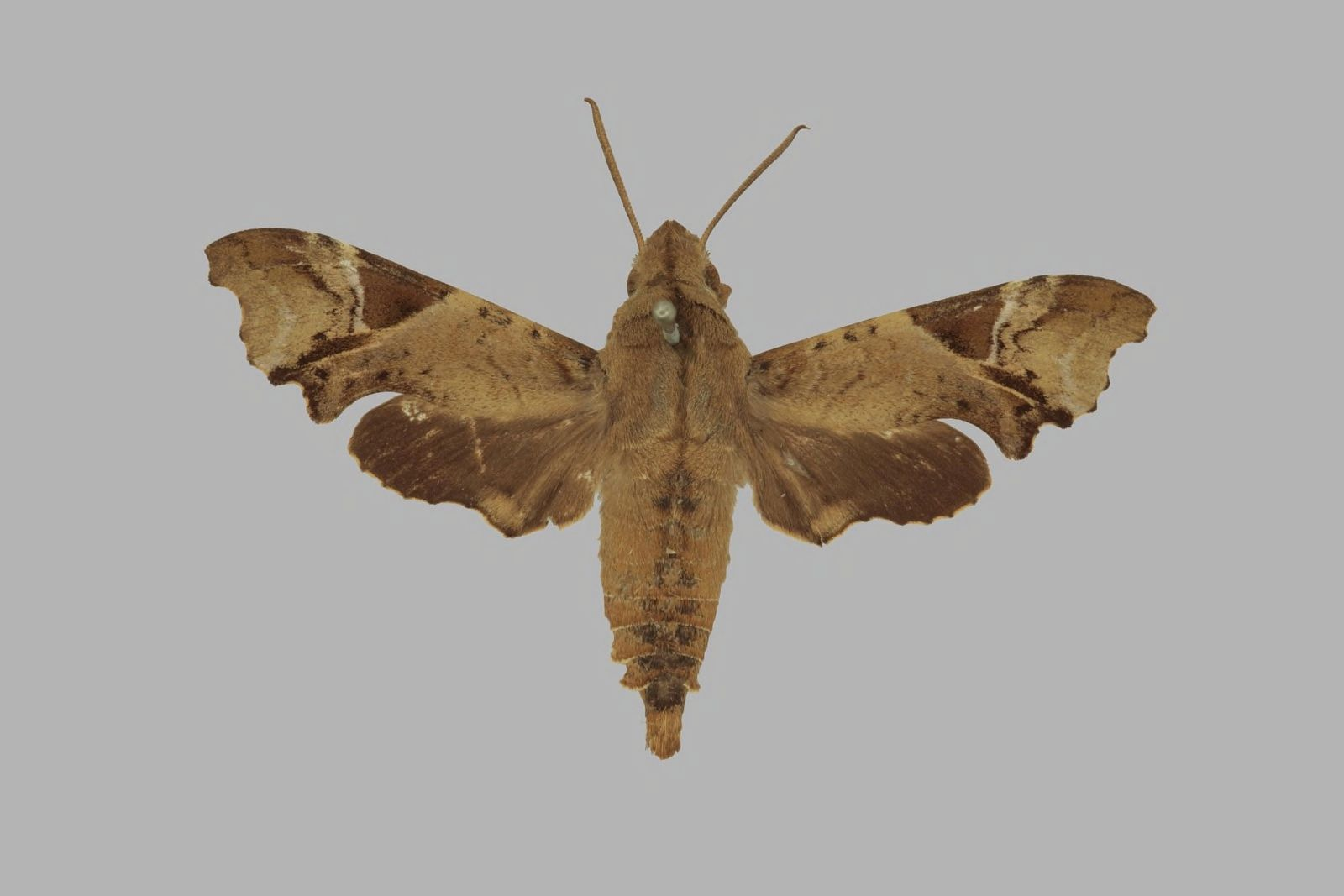
- Male Temnora camerounensis upper side view

Scientific classification
- Kingdom: Animalia
- Phylum: Arthropoda
- Class: Insecta
- Order: Lepidoptera
- Family: Sphingidae
- Genus: Temnora
- Species: T. camerounensis

Binomial name
- Temnora camerounensis Clark, 1923

= Temnora camerounensis =

Species of moth

Temnora camerounensis is a moth of the family Sphingidae. It is known from Cameroon, Gabon, the Central African Republic, the Democratic Republic of the Congo, Uganda and Nigeria.
