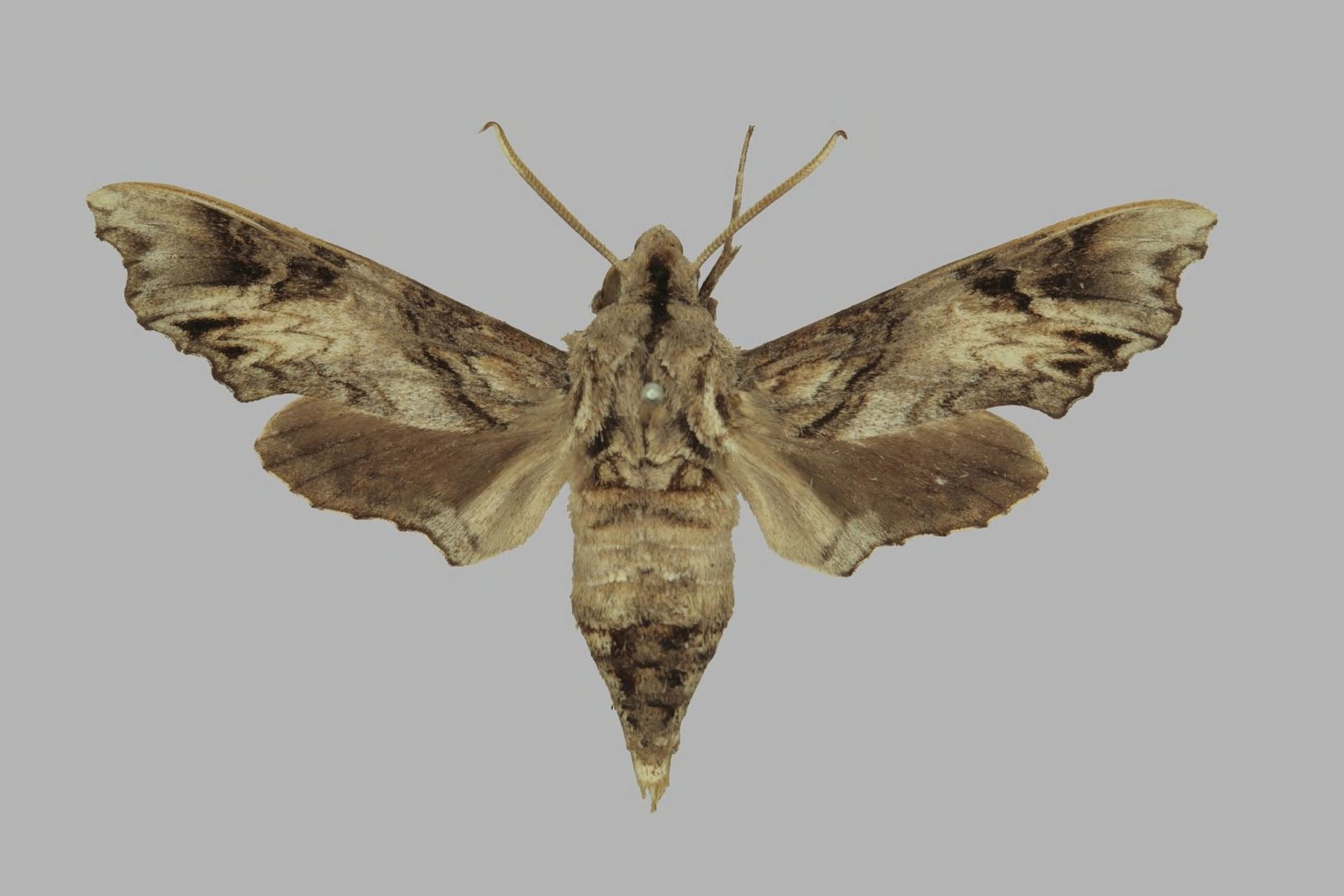
- Temnora natalis, male, upperside

Scientific classification
- Kingdom: Animalia
- Phylum: Arthropoda
- Class: Insecta
- Order: Lepidoptera
- Family: Sphingidae
- Genus: Temnora
- Species: T. natalis

Binomial name
- Temnora natalis Walker, 1856

Synonyms
- Temnora natalis kafakumbae Clark, 1936

= Temnora natalis =

Species of moth

Temnora natalis is a moth of the family Sphingidae. It is known from bush and savanna from South Africa to Zimbabwe, Zambia and Tanzania.

The length of the forewings is 22–24 mm. It is immediately distinguishable from all other Temnora species by the pale grey forewing upperside crossed by a pattern of dark brown transverse lines and with a characteristic pair of black triangular marginal spots. The forewing outer margin is crenulated.
