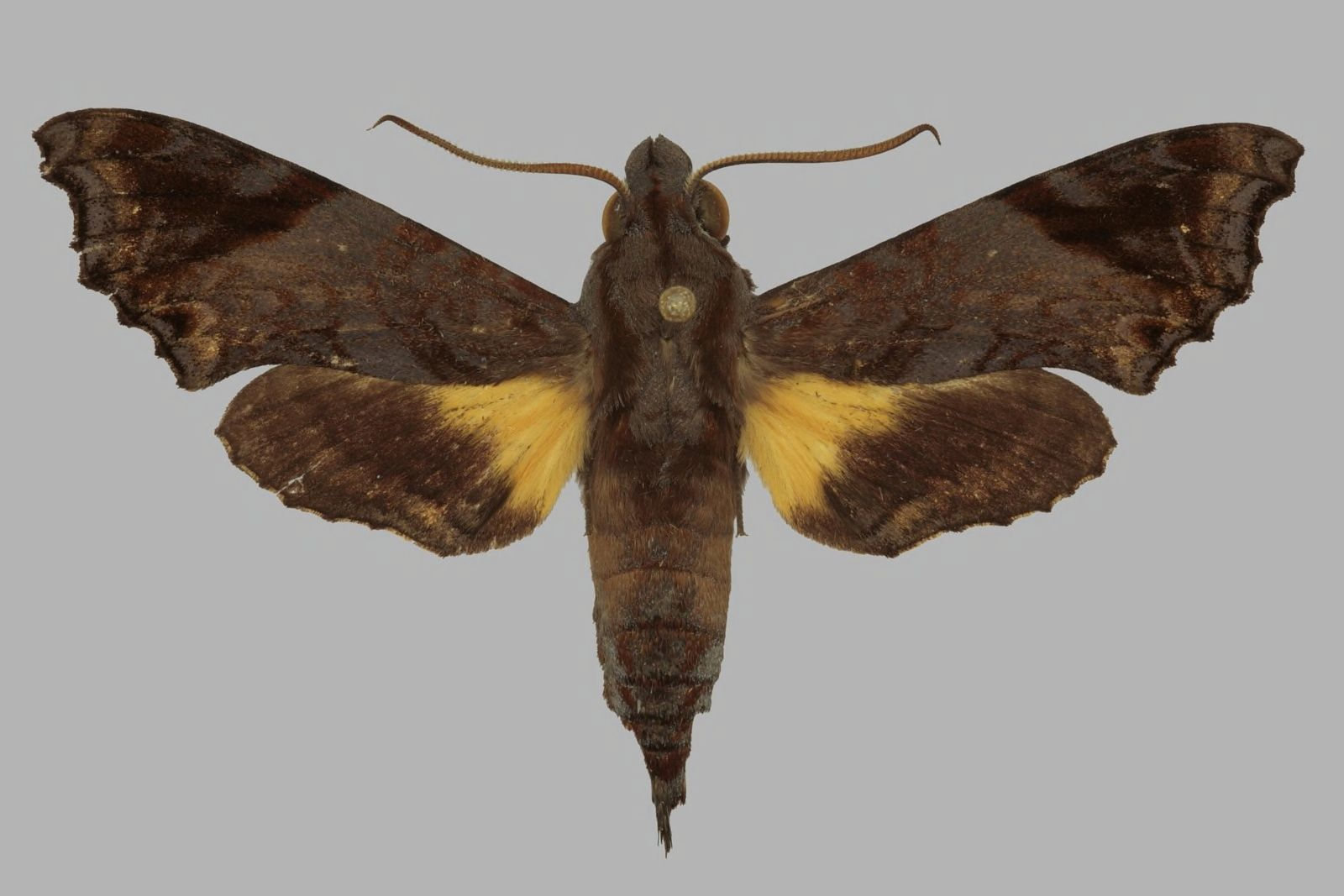

Scientific classification
- Kingdom: Animalia
- Phylum: Arthropoda
- Class: Insecta
- Order: Lepidoptera
- Family: Sphingidae
- Genus: Temnora
- Species: T. scheveni

Binomial name
- Temnora scheveni Carcasson, 1968

= Temnora scheveni =

Species of moth

Temnora scheveni is a moth of the family Sphingidae. It is known from Tanzania, Uganda and Rwanda.

The length of the forewings is 22–23 mm
