= Temnora turlini =

Scientific classification
- Kingdom: Animalia
- Phylum: Arthropoda
- Class: Insecta
- Order: Lepidoptera
- Family: Sphingidae
- Genus: Temnora
- Species: T. turlini

Binomial name
- Temnora turlini Darge, 1975

Species of moth

Temnora turlini is a moth of the family Sphingidae from Rwanda.

The wingspan is 50–52 mm.
