= Temnora swynnertoni =

Scientific classification
- Kingdom: Animalia
- Phylum: Arthropoda
- Class: Insecta
- Order: Lepidoptera
- Family: Sphingidae
- Genus: Temnora
- Species: T. swynnertoni

Binomial name
- Temnora swynnertoni Stevenson, 1938

Species of moth

Temnora swynnertoni is a moth of the family Sphingidae. It is found in eastern Zimbabwe.

The wingspan is 34–37 mm.
