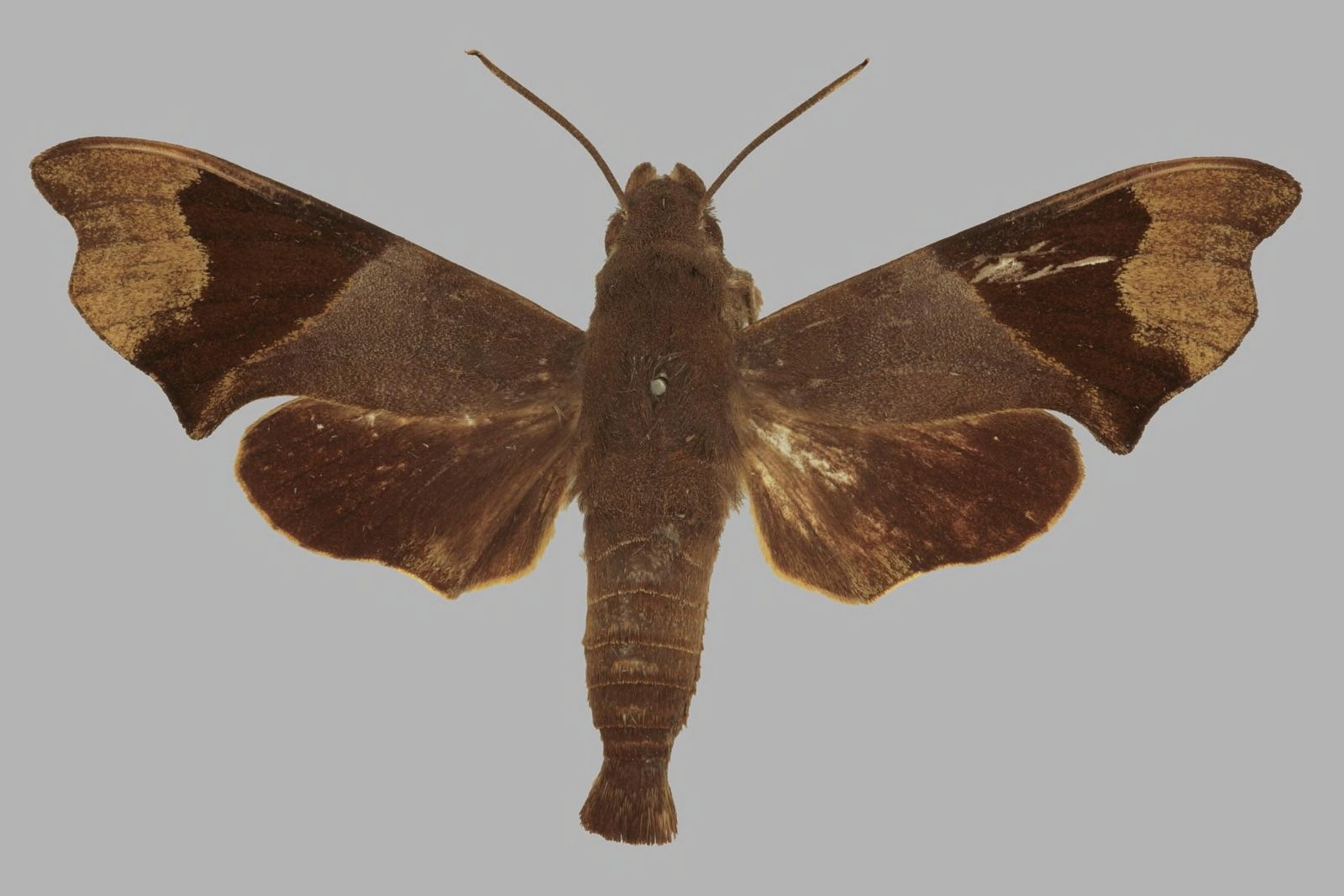
- Temnora atrofasciata

Scientific classification
- Kingdom: Animalia
- Phylum: Arthropoda
- Class: Insecta
- Order: Lepidoptera
- Family: Sphingidae
- Genus: Temnora
- Species: T. atrofasciata

Binomial name
- Temnora atrofasciata (Holland, 1889)

Synonyms
- Eulophura atrofasciata Holland, 1889; Lophuron umbrinum Rothschild, 1895

= Temnora atrofasciata =

Species of moth

Temnora atrofasciata is a moth of the family Sphingidae. It is known from Forests from western Africa to Congo and Uganda, with an apparently isolated population in the Usambara Mountains.

The length of the forewings is about 22 mm for males and 24 mm for females.
