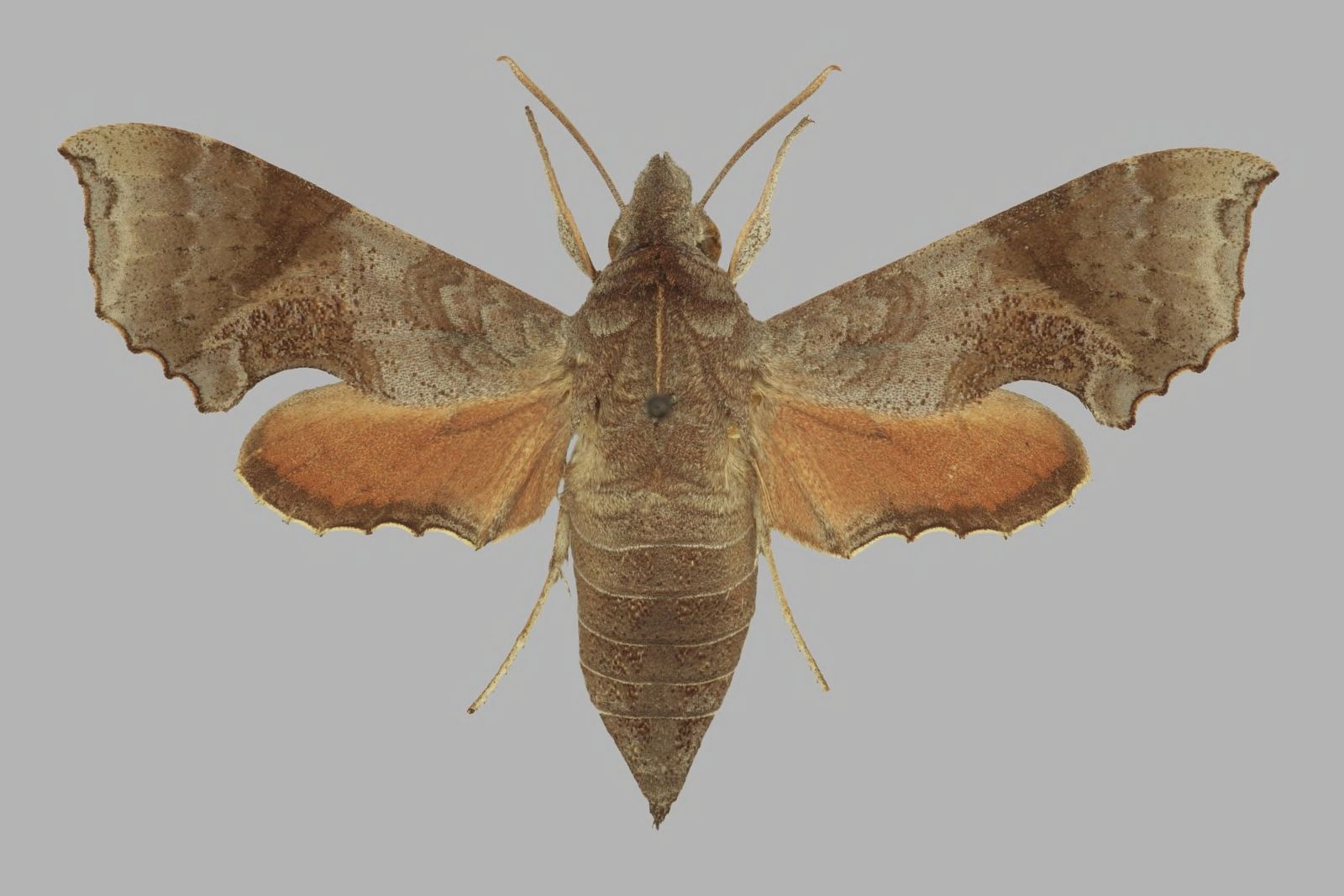

Scientific classification
- Kingdom: Animalia
- Phylum: Arthropoda
- Clade: Pancrustacea
- Class: Insecta
- Order: Lepidoptera
- Family: Sphingidae
- Genus: Temnora
- Species: T. elegans

Binomial name
- Temnora elegans (Rothschild, 1895)

Synonyms
- Diodosida elegans Rothschild, 1895

= Temnora elegans =

Species of moth

Temnora elegans is a moth of the family Sphingidae. It is known from western Africa and in savanna from Angola to Zambia, Zimbabwe, Malawi and East Africa.

The length of the forewings is 18–21 mm. It is easily distinguished from all other Temnora by the combination of the strongly dentate outer margins of the forewings and hindwings and the almost entirely bright orange hindwing upperside. The hindwing upperside has a narrow, sharply marked brown marginal band. The hindwing underside is dull orange shaded with grey, with a brown marginal band.

== Subspecies ==
- Temnora elegans elegans (western Africa)
- Temnora elegans polia Rothschild, 1904 (savanna from Angola to Zambia, Zimbabwe, Malawi and East Africa)
