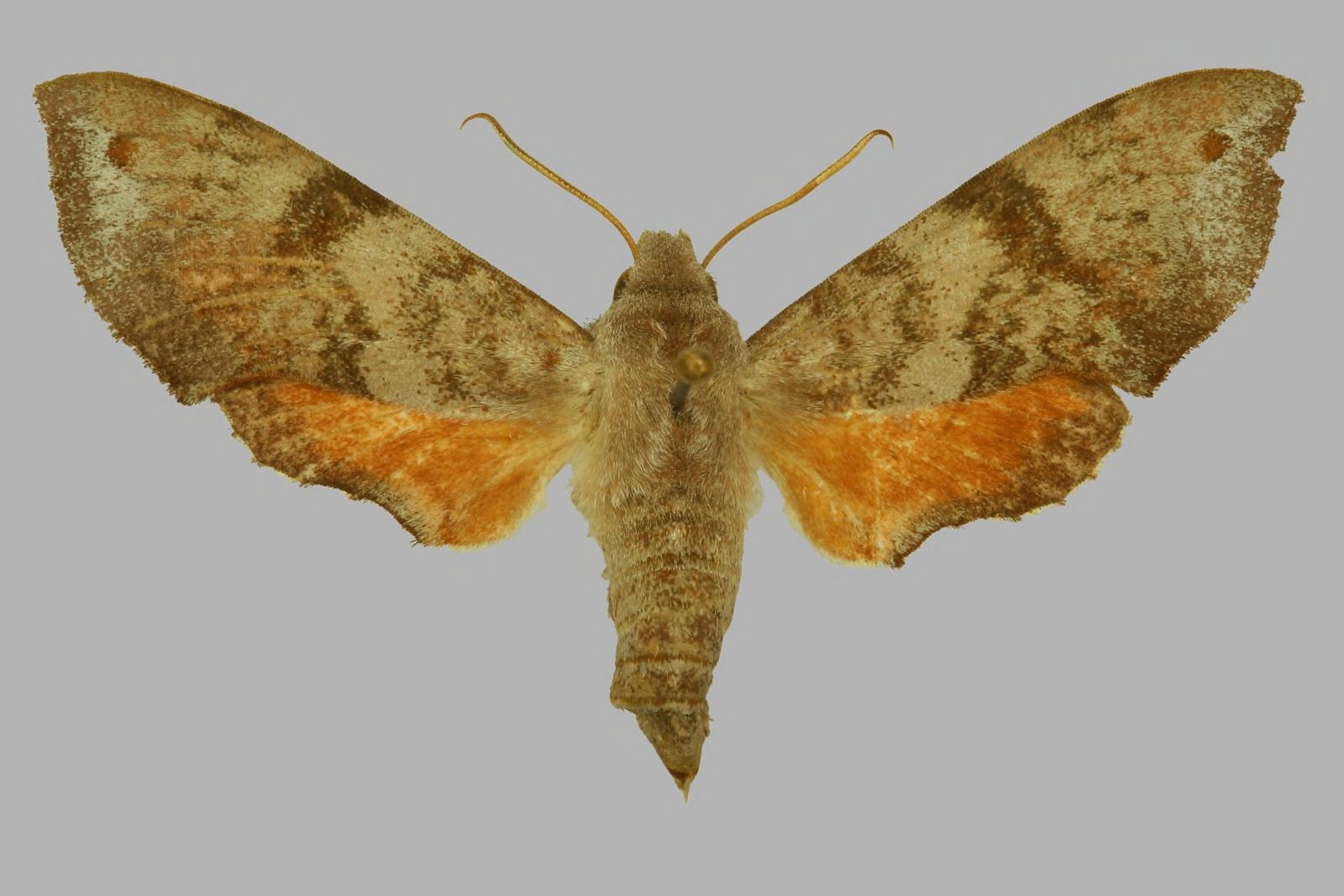

Scientific classification
- Kingdom: Animalia
- Phylum: Arthropoda
- Class: Insecta
- Order: Lepidoptera
- Family: Sphingidae
- Genus: Temnora
- Species: T. engis

Binomial name
- Temnora engis Jordan, 1933

Synonyms

= Temnora engis =

Species of moth

Temnora engis is a moth of the family Sphingidae. It is known from Madagascar.

== Subspecies ==
- Temnora engis engis
- Temnora engis catalai Griveaud, 1959
