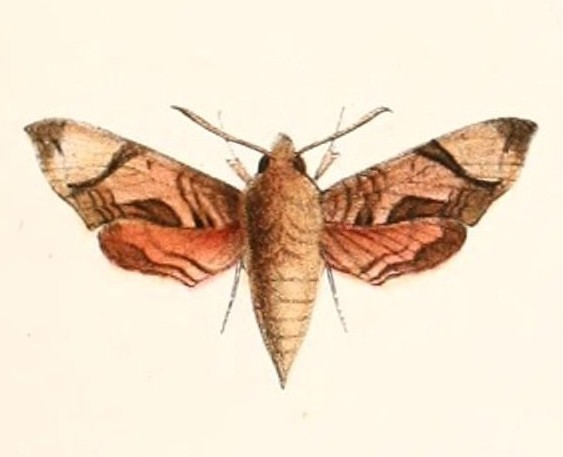
- Temnora inornatum

Scientific classification
- Domain: Eukaryota
- Kingdom: Animalia
- Phylum: Arthropoda
- Class: Insecta
- Order: Lepidoptera
- Family: Sphingidae
- Subtribe: Macroglossina
- Genus: Temnora; Walker, 1856

Species
- See text.

Synonyms
- Ocyton Boisduval, 1875; Lophuron Wallengren, 1865; Lophura Walker, 1856; Lophura Herrich-Schäffer, 1854; Gurelca Kirby, 1880; Eulophura Holland, 1889; Diodosida Walker, 1856; Aspledon Boisduval, 1875

= Temnora =

Genus of moths

Temnora is a genus of moths in the family Sphingidae.

== Species ==
- Temnora albilinea Rothschild, 1904
- Temnora angulosa Rothschild & Jordan, 1906
- Temnora argyropeza (Mabille, 1879)
- Temnora atrofasciata (Holland, 1889)
- Temnora avinoffi Clark, 1919
- Temnora bouyeri Cadiou, 2003
- Temnora burdoni Carcasson, 1968
- Temnora camerounensis Clark, 1923
- Temnora crenulata (Holland, 1893)
- Temnora curtula Rothschild & Jordan, 1908
- Temnora dierli Cadiou, 1997
- Temnora elegans (Rothschild, 1895)
- Temnora elisabethae Hering, 1930
- Temnora engis Jordan, 1933
- Temnora eranga (Holland, 1889)
- Temnora fumosa (Walker, 1856)
- Temnora funebris (Holland, 1893)
- Temnora grandidieri (Butler, 1879)
- Temnora griseata Rothschild & Jordan, 1903
- Temnora hollandi Clark, 1920
- Temnora iapygoides (Holland, 1889)
- Temnora inornatum (Rothschild, 1894)
- Temnora kaguru Darge, 2004
- Temnora leighi Rothschild & Jordan, 1915
- Temnora livida Holland, 1889
- Temnora marginata (Walker, 1856)
- Temnora masungai Darge, 2009
- Temnora mirabilis Talbot, 1932
- Temnora murina Walker, 1856
- Temnora namaqua Rothschild & Jordan, 1903
- Temnora natalis Walker, 1856
- Temnora nephele Clark, 1922
- Temnora nitida Jordan, 1920
- Temnora ntombi Darge, 1975
- Temnora palpalis Rothschild & Jordan, 1903
- Temnora peckoveri (Butler, 1876)
- Temnora plagiata Walker, 1856
- Temnora probata Darge, 2004
- Temnora pseudopylas (Rothschild, 1894)
- Temnora pylades Rothschild & Jordan, 1903
- Temnora pylas (Cramer, 1779)
- Temnora radiata (Karsch, 1893)
- Temnora rattrayi Rothschild, 1894
- Temnora reutlingeri (Holland, 1889)
- Temnora robertsoni Carcasson, 1968
- Temnora rungwe Darge, 2004
- Temnora sardanus (Walker, 1856)
- Temnora scheveni Carcasson, 1968
- Temnora scitula (Holland, 1889)
- Temnora spiritus (Holland, 1893)
- Temnora stevensi Rothschild & Jordan, 1903
- Temnora subapicalis Rothschild & Jordan, 1903
- Temnora swynnertoni Stevenson, 1938
- Temnora trapezoidea Clark, 1935
- Temnora turlini Darge, 1975
- Temnora uluguru Darge, 2004
- Temnora wollastoni Rothschild & Jordan, 1908
- Temnora zantus (Herrich-Schaffer, 1854)
