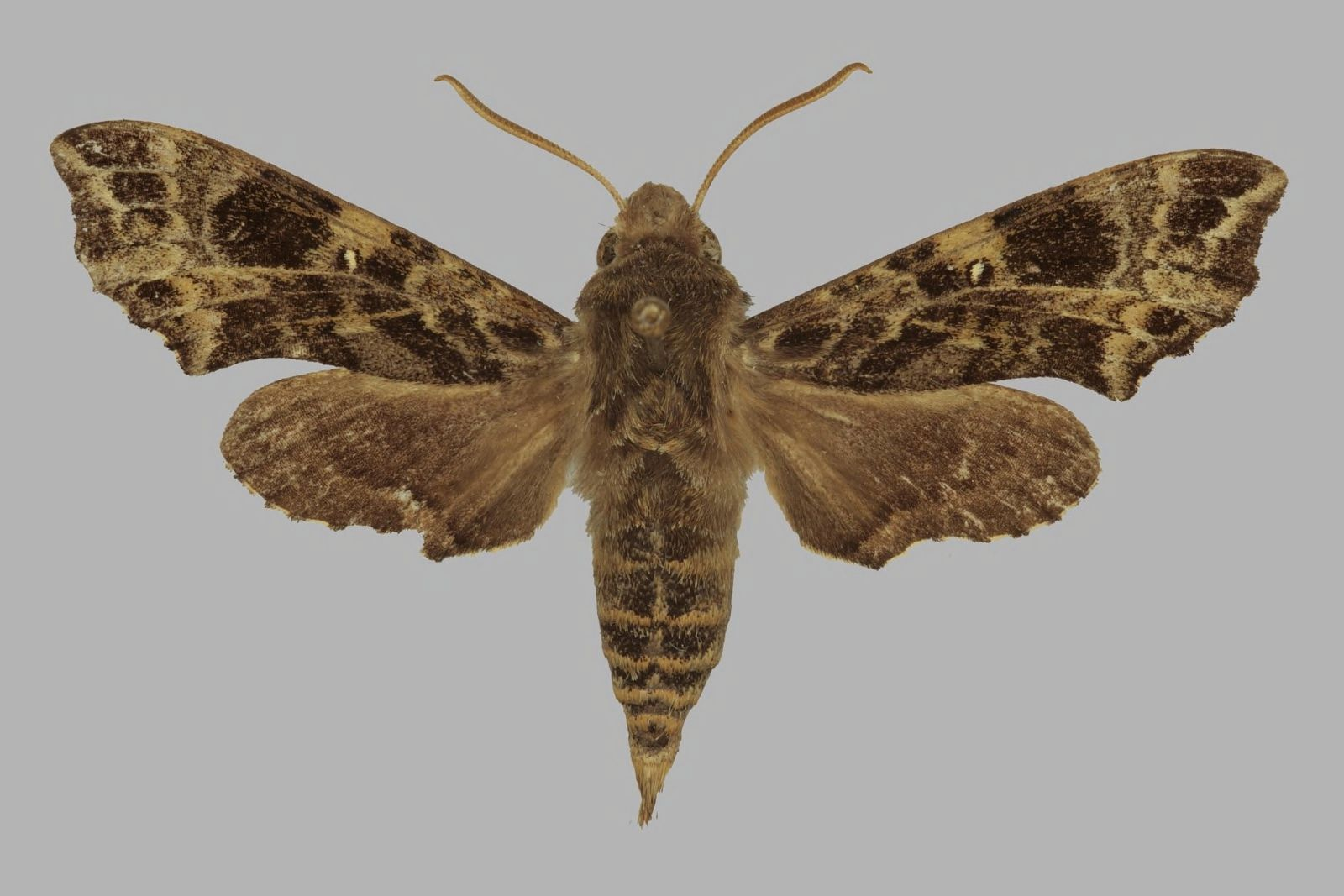

Scientific classification
- Kingdom: Animalia
- Phylum: Arthropoda
- Class: Insecta
- Order: Lepidoptera
- Family: Sphingidae
- Genus: Temnora
- Species: T. trapezoidea

Binomial name
- Temnora trapezoidea Clark, 1935

= Temnora trapezoidea =

Species of moth

Temnora trapezoidea is a moth of the family Sphingidae. It is found from Nigeria to Kenya, Tanzania and Zambia.

The length of the forewings is about 22 mm.
