= Temnora probata =

Scientific classification
- Kingdom: Animalia
- Phylum: Arthropoda
- Class: Insecta
- Order: Lepidoptera
- Family: Sphingidae
- Genus: Temnora
- Species: T. probata

Binomial name
- Temnora probata Darge, 2004

Species of moth

Temnora probata is a moth of the family Sphingidae. It is known from Tanzania.

The wingspan is 39–43 mm.
