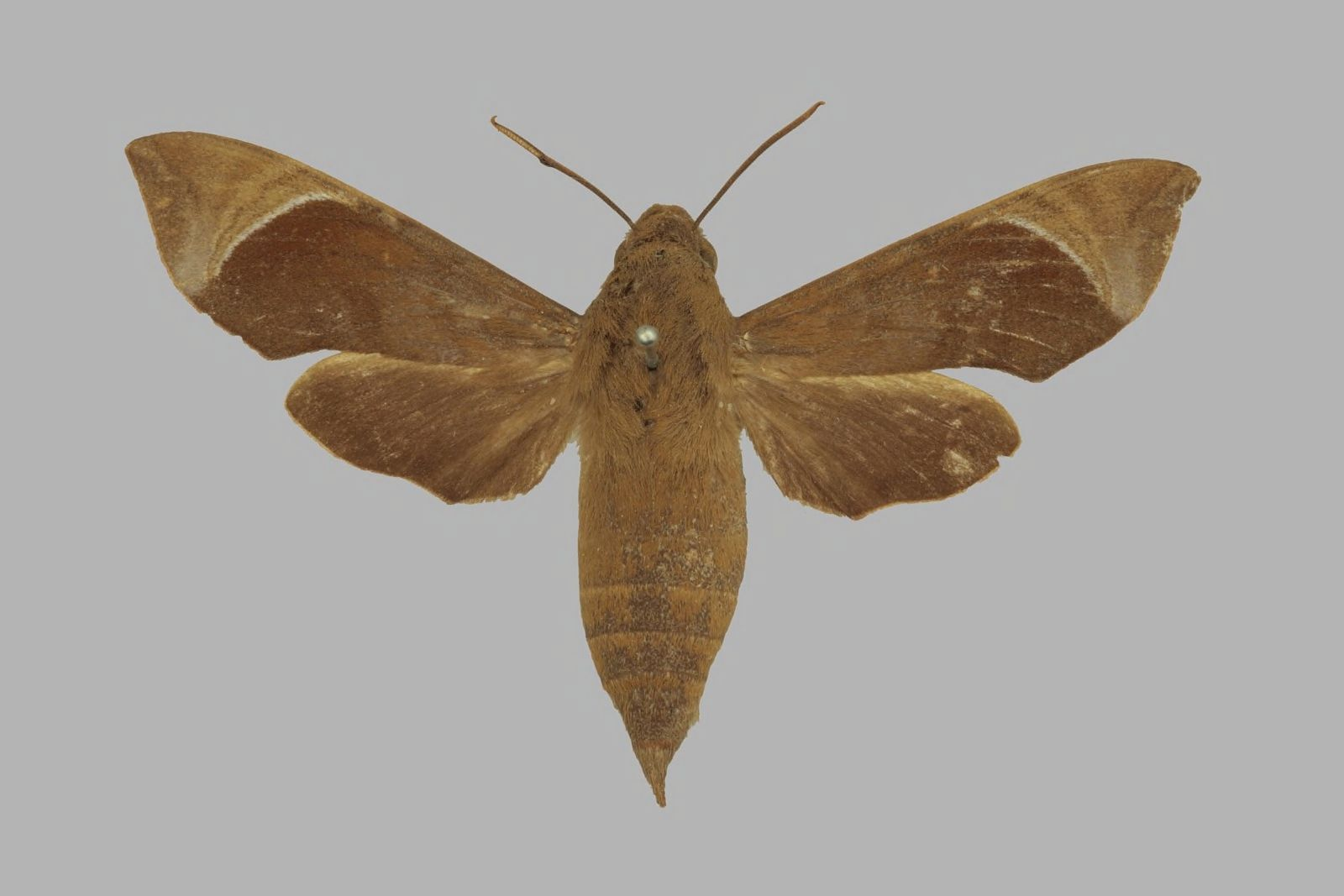
- Female

Scientific classification
- Kingdom: Animalia
- Phylum: Arthropoda
- Class: Insecta
- Order: Lepidoptera
- Family: Sphingidae
- Genus: Temnora
- Species: T. albilinea

Binomial name
- Temnora albilinea Rothschild, 1904

Synonyms
- Temnora albilinea obscurascens Strand, 1913

= Temnora albilinea =

Species of moth

Temnora albilinea is a moth of the family Sphingidae. It is known from forests from Cameroon to Angola, Congo, Uganda, Kenya and Tanzania.

The length of the forewings is 25–27 mm. The body and both wings are very dark olive. The forewings are narrow and long and have a very fine curved whitish line running from the tornus to the costa. The apical area is paler. The abdominal tufts of the male are red.
