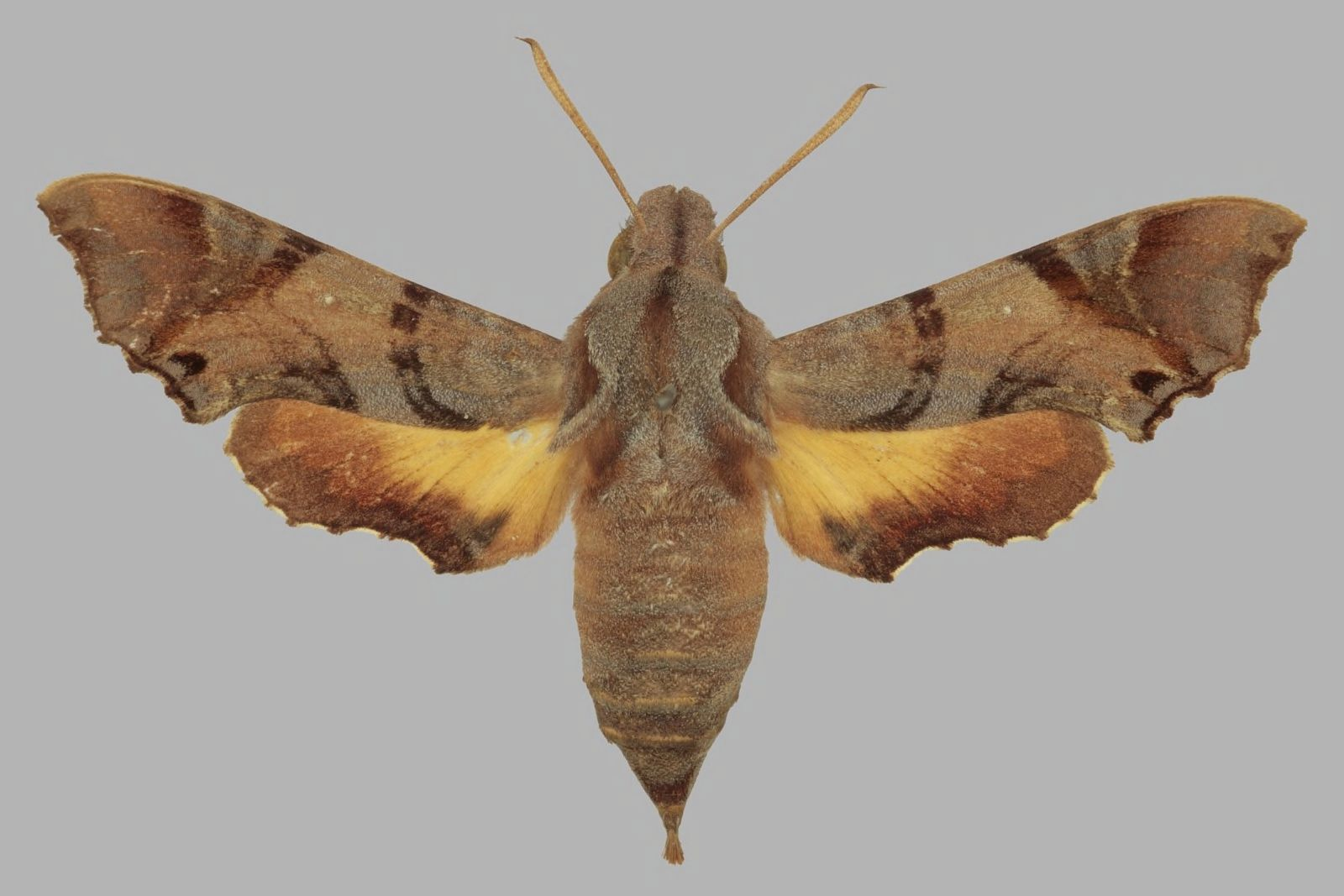

Scientific classification
- Kingdom: Animalia
- Phylum: Arthropoda
- Class: Insecta
- Order: Lepidoptera
- Family: Sphingidae
- Genus: Temnora
- Species: T. pylas

Binomial name
- Temnora pylas (Cramer, 1779)

Synonyms
- Sphinx pylas Cramer, 1779; Lophura brisaeus Walker, 1856

= Temnora pylas =

Species of moth

Temnora pylas is a moth of the family Sphingidae. It is known from South Africa and Zimbabwe.

The forewing upperside ground colour is pale brown, with darker brown transverse bands and other markings. The basal band is dark brown and the subbasal band consists of two dark brown lines separated by the ground colour. The antemedian band is dark brown but with some ground colour medially. It is evenly curved from the costa to the inner margin. The postmedian band is dark brown. The forewing underside is uniformly orange-brown. The hindwing upperside is basally yellow, the postmedian band is orange and the marginal band is pale brown, the borders between these are very diffuse. The orange postmedian band is twice the width of the brown marginal band. The outer margin has a dark shade. The hindwing underside is uniformly orange-brown. The inner edge is yellowish near the base.

== Subspecies ==
- Temnora pylas pylas (South Africa to Zimbabwe)
- Temnora pylas exilis Kernbach, 1962 (Zimbabwe)
