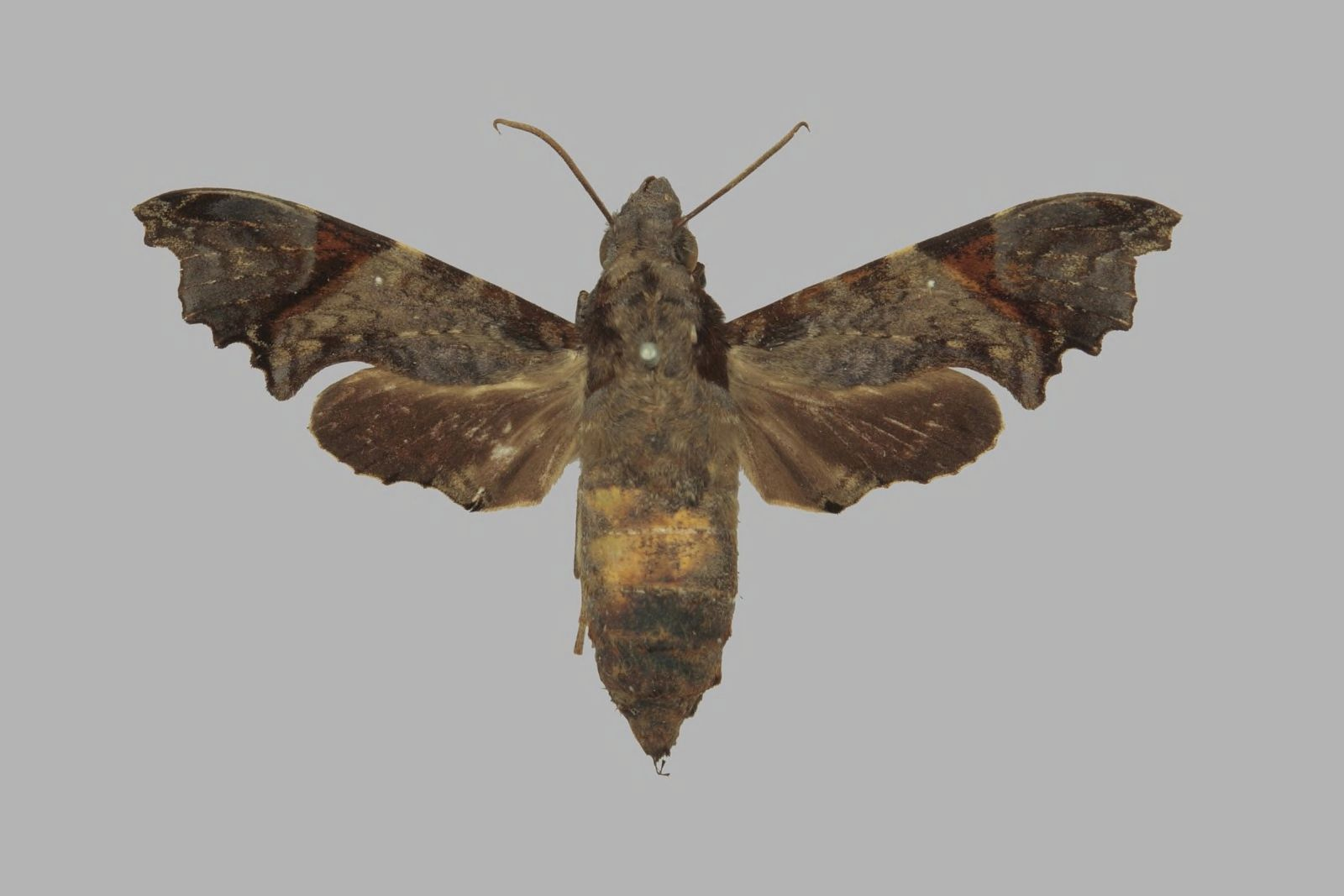

Scientific classification
- Kingdom: Animalia
- Phylum: Arthropoda
- Class: Insecta
- Order: Lepidoptera
- Family: Sphingidae
- Genus: Temnora
- Species: T. wollastoni

Binomial name
- Temnora wollastoni Rothschild & Jordan, 1908

= Temnora wollastoni =

Species of moth

Temnora wollastoni is a moth of the family Sphingidae. It is found from Liberia, east to the Central African Republic and then south to the Democratic Republic of the Congo, the Republic of the Congo and Gabon.

The length of the forewings is about approximately 22 mm. It is similar to Temnora zantus zantus, but the apical area of the forewing upperside is the same dark brown as the basal area of the wing. The forewing upperside has numerous transverse brown lines, crenulated in the basal part, dentate in the distal part, with an oblique band which is widest at the costa and reaches the outer margin. The hindwing upperside is brown, with a black marginal dot at the tornus and marginal vein dots.
