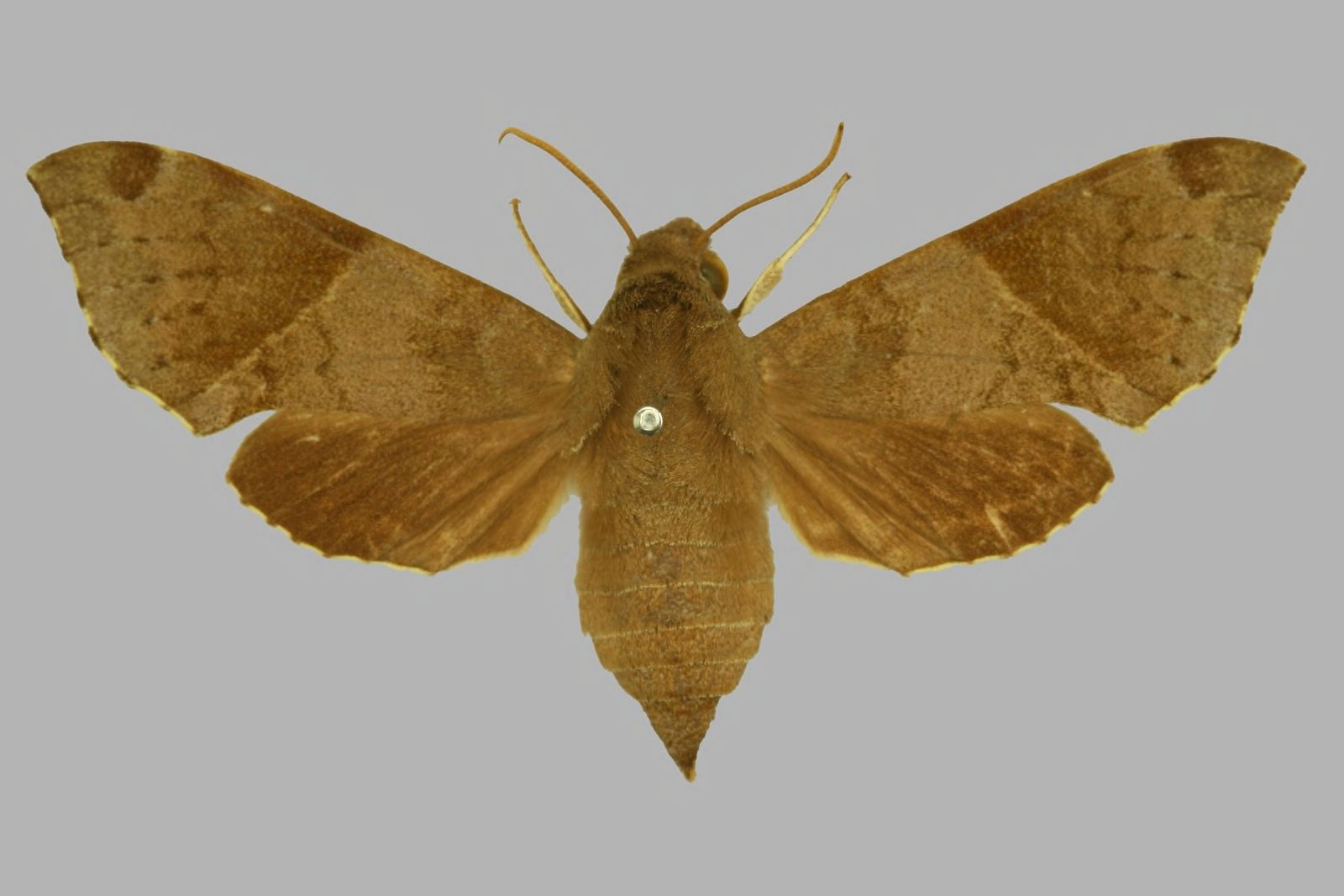
- Temnora reutlingeri, female, upperside 12m .

Scientific classification
- Kingdom: Animalia
- Phylum: Arthropoda
- Clade: Pancrustacea
- Class: Insecta
- Order: Lepidoptera
- Family: Sphingidae
- Genus: Temnora
- Species: T. reutlingeri

Binomial name
- Temnora reutlingeri (Holland, 1889)

Synonyms
- Ocyton reutlingeri Holland, 1889

= Temnora reutlingeri =

Species of moth

Temnora reutlingeri is a moth of the family Sphingidae. It is known from Nigeria to Gabon.Temnora reutlingeri belongs to the genus Temnora, and the family Sphingidae. There is no other species listed as such.

== Subspecies ==
- Temnora reutlingeri reutlingeri
- Temnora reutlingeri bousqueti Darge, 1989 (Bioko)
