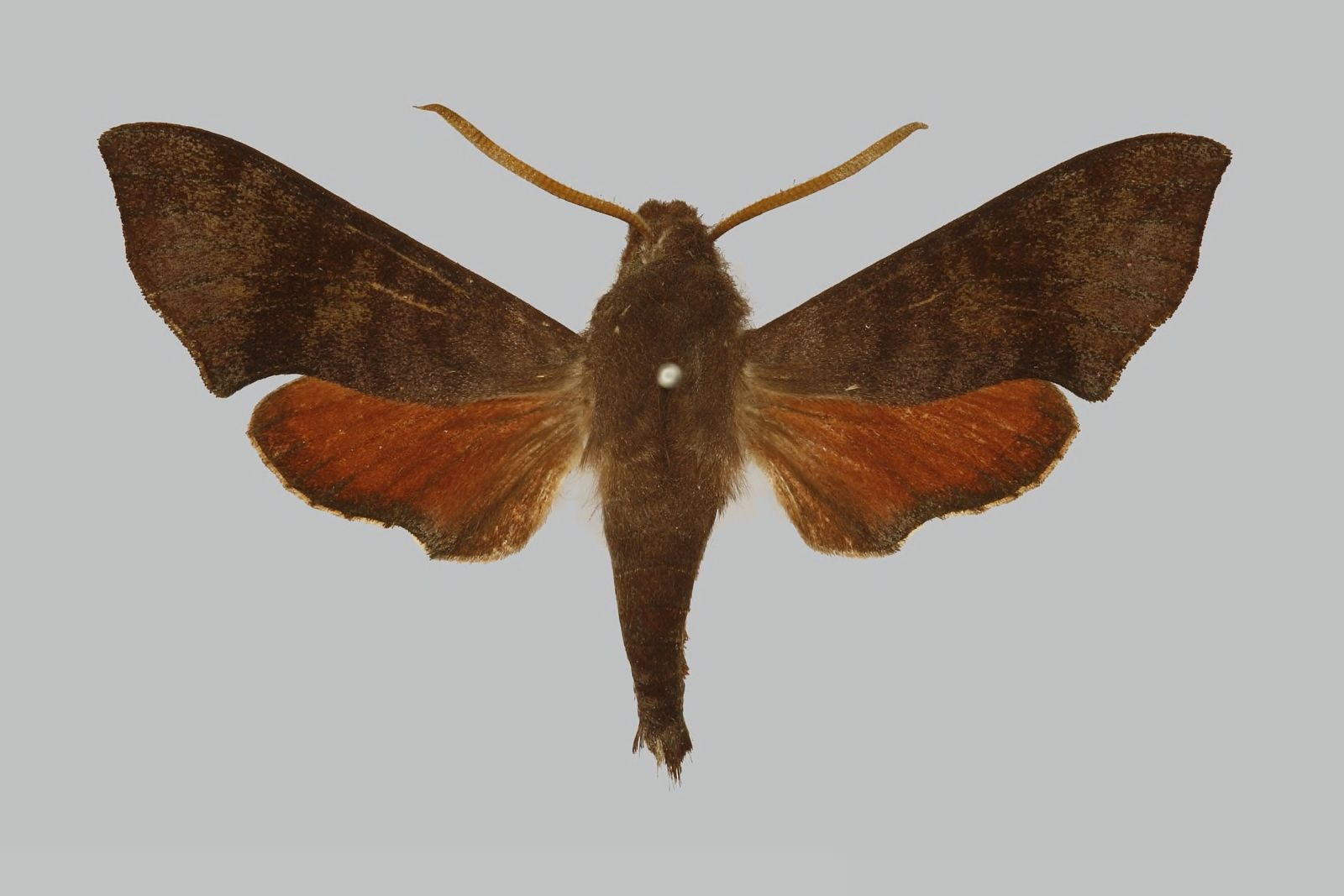

Scientific classification
- Kingdom: Animalia
- Phylum: Arthropoda
- Class: Insecta
- Order: Lepidoptera
- Family: Sphingidae
- Genus: Temnora
- Species: T. burdoni

Binomial name
- Temnora burdoni Carcasson, 1968

= Temnora burdoni =

Species of moth

Temnora burdoni is a moth of the family Sphingidae. It is known from Tanzania.

The length of the forewings is about 22 mm.
