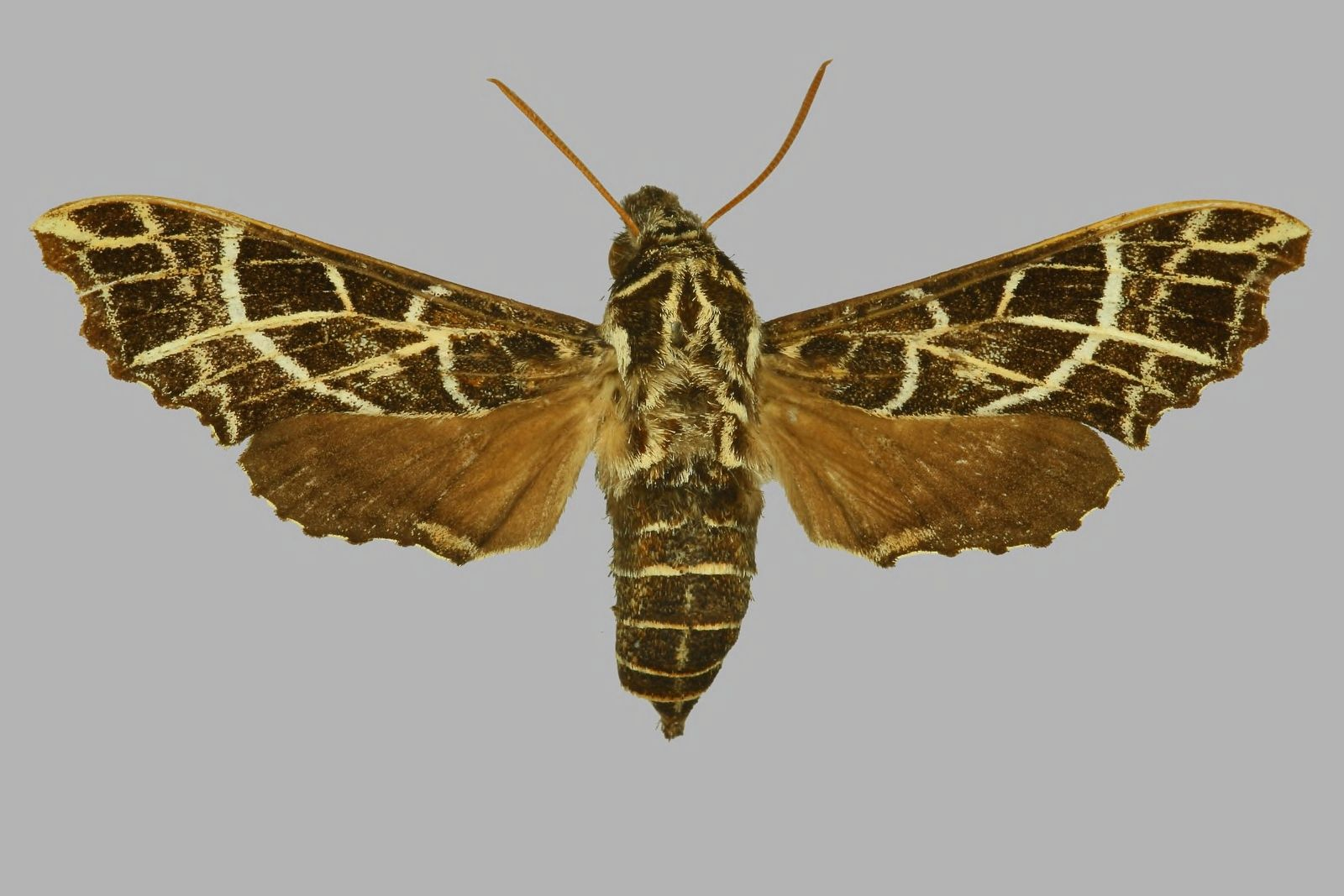

Scientific classification
- Kingdom: Animalia
- Phylum: Arthropoda
- Class: Insecta
- Order: Lepidoptera
- Family: Sphingidae
- Genus: Temnora
- Species: T. mirabilis

Binomial name
- Temnora mirabilis Talbot, 1932

= Temnora mirabilis =

Species of moth

Temnora mirabilis is a moth of the family Sphingidae. It is known from Kenya and Rwanda.

The length of the forewings is about 27 mm.
