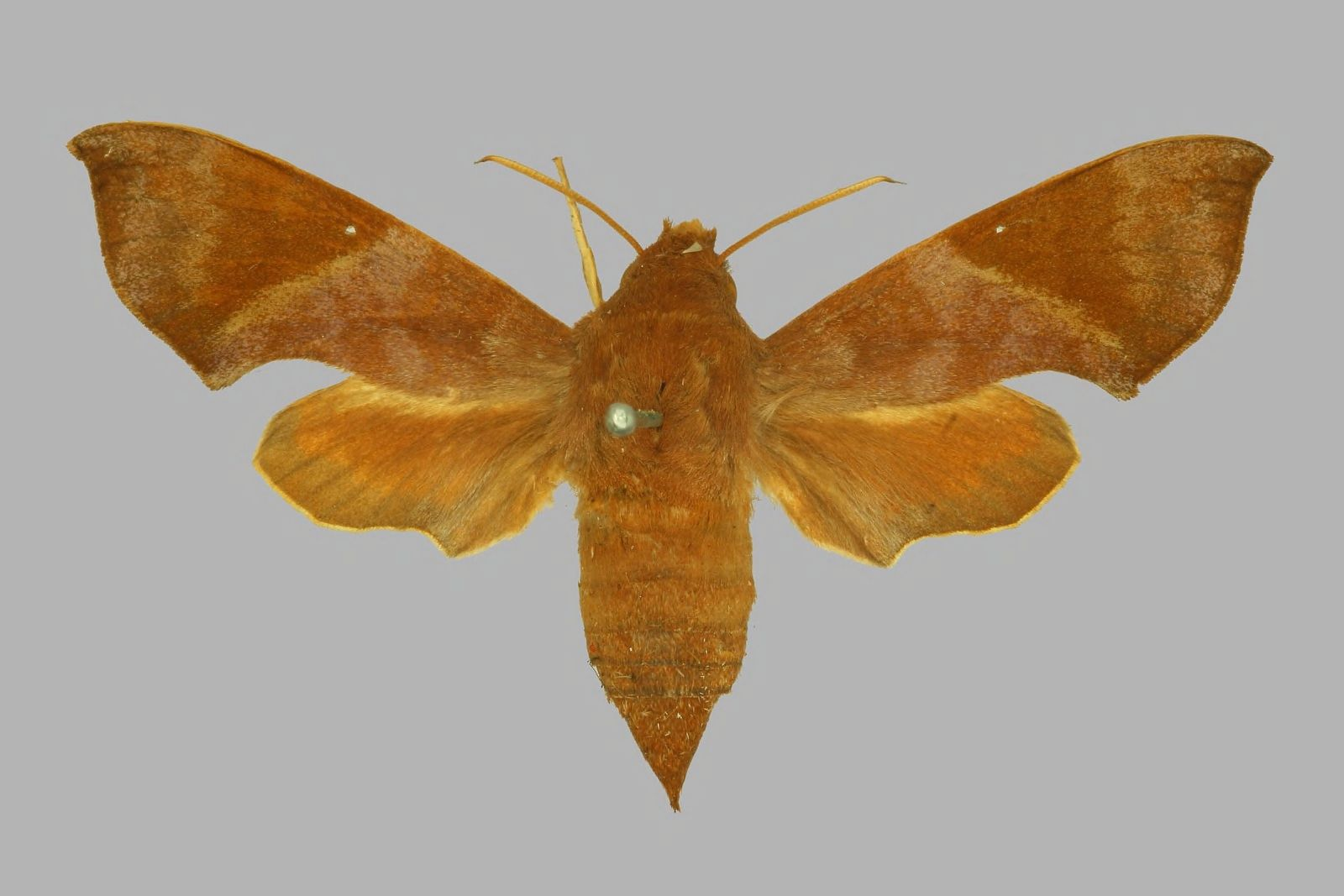
- Temnora marginata marginata

Scientific classification
- Kingdom: Animalia
- Phylum: Arthropoda
- Class: Insecta
- Order: Lepidoptera
- Family: Sphingidae
- Genus: Temnora
- Species: T. marginata

Binomial name
- Temnora marginata (Walker, 1856)

Synonyms
- Darapsa marginata Walker, 1856; Diodosida brunnea Rothschild, 1894

= Temnora marginata =

Species of moth

Temnora marginata is a moth of the family Sphingidae first described by Francis Walker in 1856. It is known from savannah and woodland in eastern and southern Africa.

The length of the forewings is 21–23 mm.

== Subspecies ==
- Temnora marginata marginata
- Temnora marginata comorana Rothschild & Jordan, 1903 (Comoro Islands)
