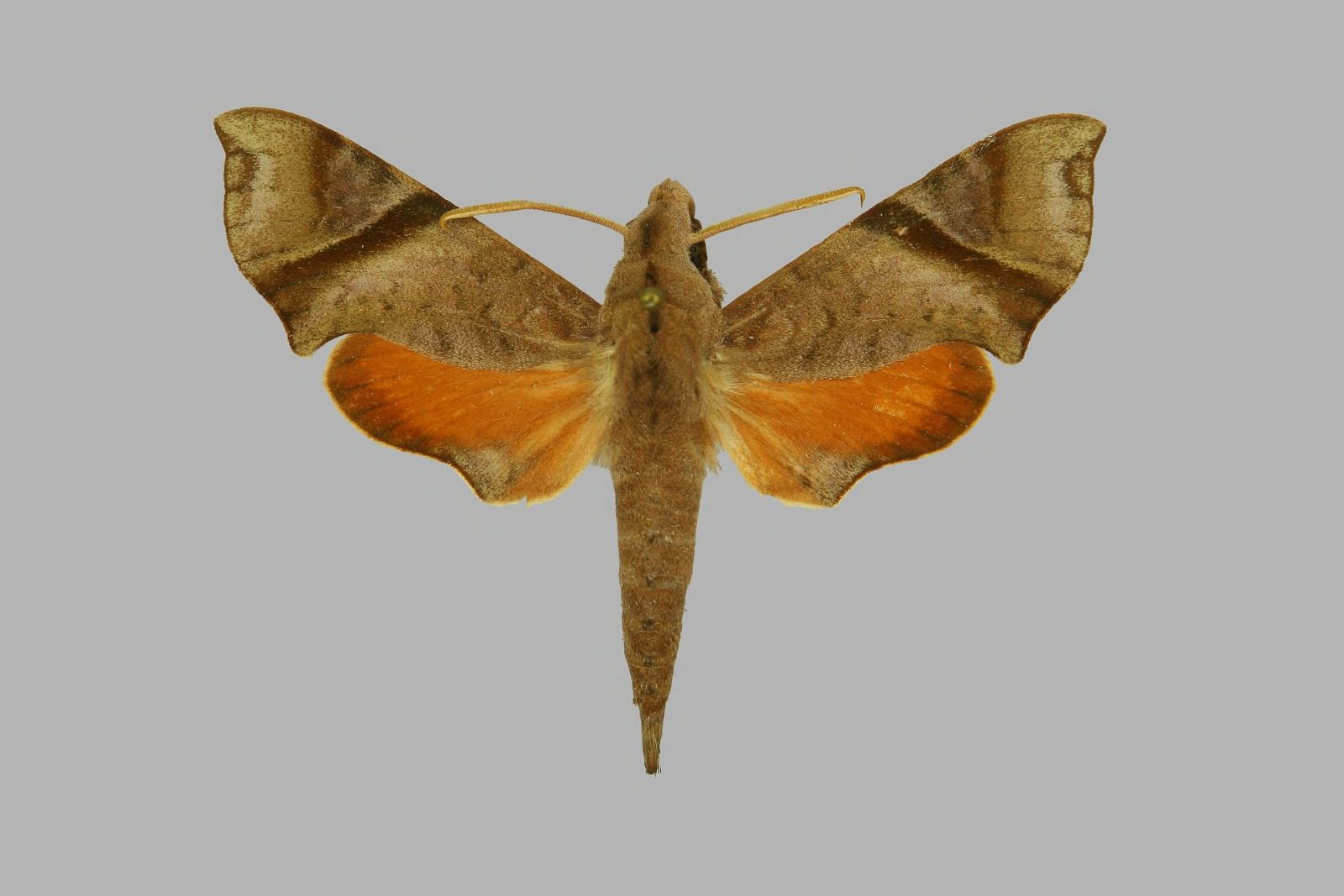

Scientific classification
- Kingdom: Animalia
- Phylum: Arthropoda
- Class: Insecta
- Order: Lepidoptera
- Family: Sphingidae
- Genus: Temnora
- Species: T. nitida

Binomial name
- Temnora nitida Jordan, 1920

= Temnora nitida =

Species of moth

Temnora nitida is a moth of the family Sphingidae. It is known from Madagascar.

The length of the forewings is about 26 mm. It is similar to Temnora murina, but the forewing is more excavated below the apex and above the tornus and the forewing upperside has a broad olive-brown band of equal width running from the middle of the costa to the outer margin, its distal edge is highlighted with a pale coloration. The hindwing upperside is orange with a diffuse, slightly darker marginal band.
