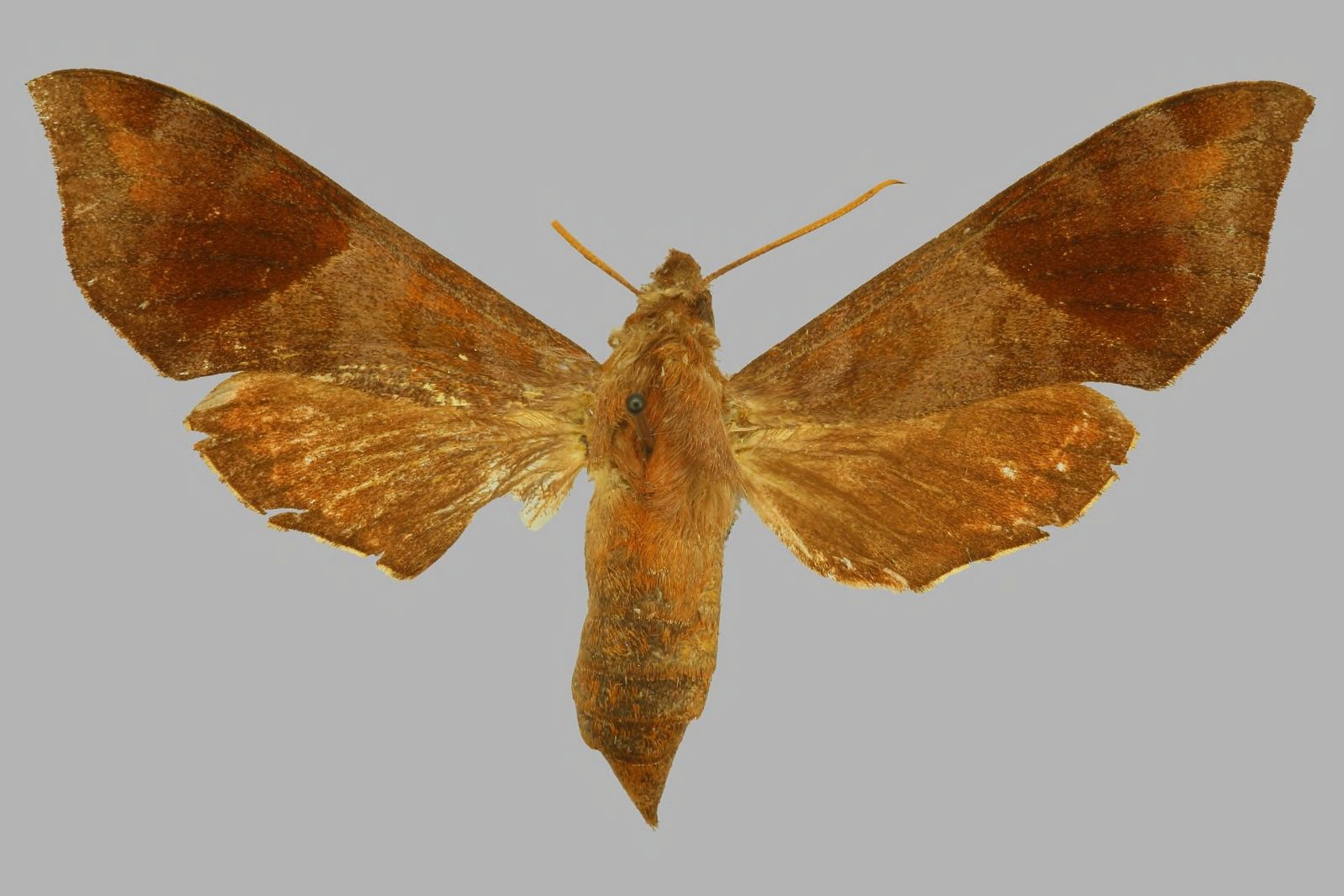
- Temnora subapicalis subapicalis, female, upperside. Kenya, B.E.A., Escarpment

Scientific classification
- Kingdom: Animalia
- Phylum: Arthropoda
- Class: Insecta
- Order: Lepidoptera
- Family: Sphingidae
- Genus: Temnora
- Species: T. subapicalis

Binomial name
- Temnora subapicalis Rothschild & Jordan, 1903

= Temnora subapicalis =

Species of moth

Temnora subapicalis is a moth of the family Sphingidae. It is known from highland forest in central Kenya and also in Zimbabwe.

== Subspecies ==
- Temnora subapicalis subapicalis
- Temnora subapicalis hayesi Darge, 1975 (Rwanda)
