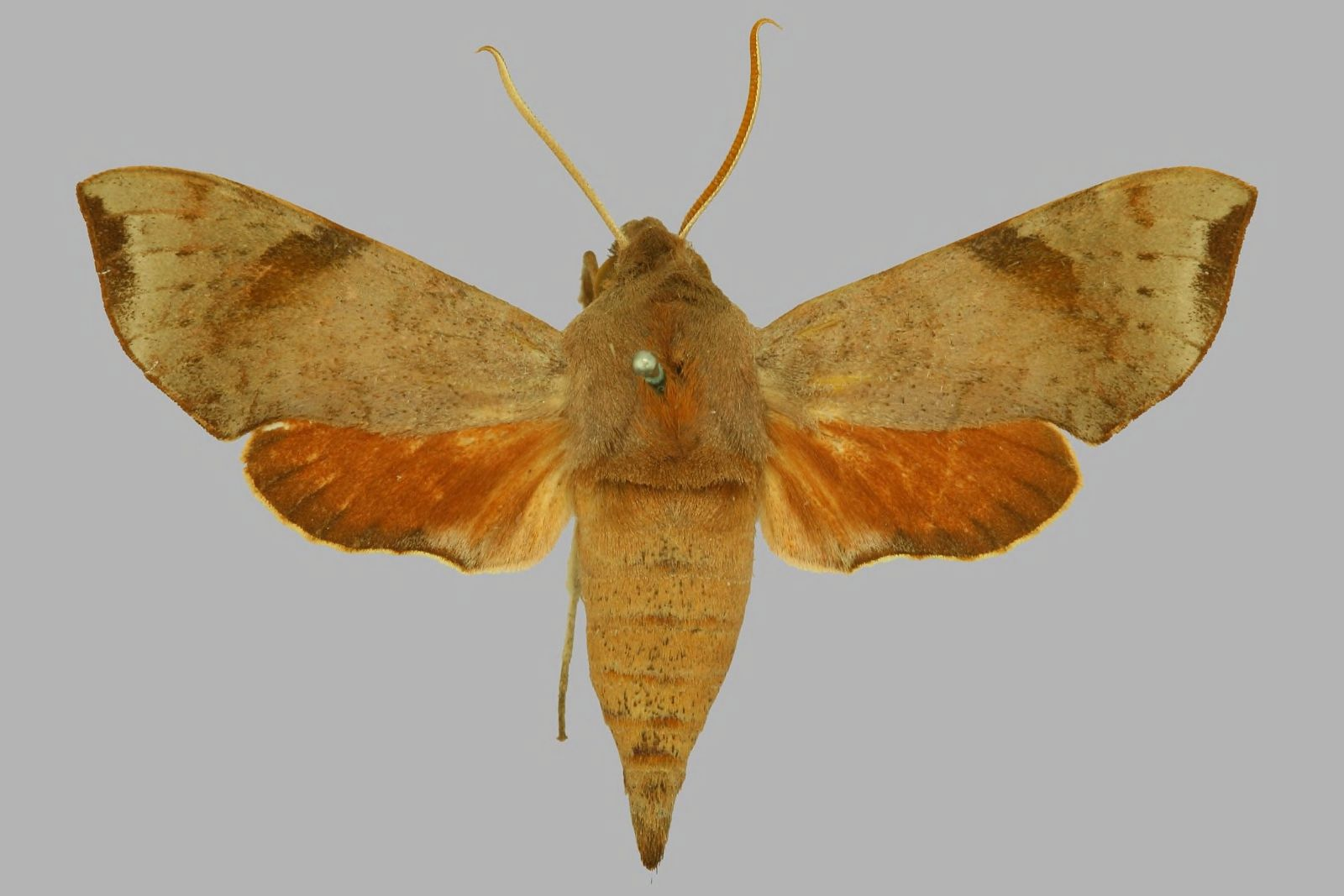

Scientific classification
- Kingdom: Animalia
- Phylum: Arthropoda
- Class: Insecta
- Order: Lepidoptera
- Family: Sphingidae
- Genus: Temnora
- Species: T. murina

Binomial name
- Temnora murina Walker, 1856

Synonyms
- Diodosida murina Walker, 1856; Ocyton tyrrhus Boisduval, 1875

= Temnora murina =

Species of moth

Temnora murina is a moth of the family Sphingidae. It is known from South Africa.

The forewing outer margin is evenly convex and only very slightly excavated below apex and above the tornus. The forewing upperside ground colour is pale greyish brown. The subbasal, antemedian and postmedian bands are double and curved and the submarginal band is represented by a double row of vein-dots. The outer margin has a dark spot below the apex. The hindwing upperside is brownish orange with a brown marginal band.
