= List of moths of China (Sesiidae) =

The moth family Sesiidae has 108 representatives in China.

For a list of moths in China in other families, see List of moths of China.

- Bembecia bestianeli (Capuse, 1973)
- Bembecia ceiformis (Staudinger, 1881)
- Bembecia hedysari Yang & Wang, 1994
- Bembecia insidiosa (Le Cerf, 1911)
- Bembecia lasicera (Hampson, 1906)
- Bembecia scopigera (Scopoli, 1763)
- Bembecia sophoracola Xu & Jin, 1999
- Bembecia tancrei (Püngeler, 1905)
- Bembecia viguraea (Püngeler, 1912)
- Chamaesphecia astatiformis (Herrich-Schäffer, 1845)
- Chamaesphecia colochelyna Bryk, 1947
- Chamaesphecia schroederi Tosevski, 1993
- Cissuvora huoshanensis Xu, 1993
- Cissuvora romanovi (Leech, 1888)
- Euhagena variegata (Walker, 1864)
- Heliodinesesia ulmi Yang & Wang, 1989
- Macroscelesia longipes (Moore, 1877)
- Melittia bombyliformis (Cramer, 1782)
- Melittia eurytion (Westwood, 1848)
- Melittia formosana Matsumura, 1911
- Melittia gigantea (Moore, 1879)
- Melittia indica Butler, 1874
- Melittia japona Hampson, 1919
- Melittia sangaica Moore, 1877
- Nokona pernix (Leech, 1888)
- Oligophlebiella polishana Strand, 1916
- Paradoxecia gravis (Walker, [1865])
- Paradoxecia pieli Lieu, 1935
- Paranthrene actinidiae Yang & Wang, 1989
- Paranthrene aurivena (Bryk, 1947)
- Paranthrene bicincta (Walker, 1864)
- Paranthrene chinensis (Leech, 1889)
- Paranthrene chrysoidea Zukowsky, 1932
- Paranthrene pompilus Bryk, 1947
- Paranthrene regalis (Butler, 1878)
- Paranthrene semidiaphana Zukowaky, 1929
- Paranthrene tabaniformis (Rottemburg, 1775)
- Paranthrene trizonata (Hampson, 1900)
- Paranthrenopsis pogonias (Bryk, 1947)
- Paranthrenopsis siniaevi Gorbunov & Arita, 2000
- Pennisetia fixseni (Leech, 1888)
- Pennisetia hylaeiformis (Laspeyres, 1801)
- Pyropteron chrysoneura (Püngeler, 1912)
- Rectala asyliformis Bryk, 1947
- Scalarignathia kaszabi Capuse, 1973
- Scalarignathia sinensis (Hampson, 1919)
- Scasiba caryavora Xu, 1994
- Scasiba taikanensis Matsumura, 1931
- Sesia gloriosa (Le Cerf, 1914)
- Sesia huaxica Xu, 1995
- Sesia oberthueri (Le Cerf, 1914)
- Sesia przewalskii (Alphéraky, 1882)
- Sesia rhynchioides (Butler, 1881)
- Sesia sheni Arita & Xu, 1994
- Sesia siningensis (Xu, 1981)
- Sesia solitera Spatenka & Arita, 1992
- Sesia tibetensis Arita & Xu, 1994
- Sphecosesia litchivora Yang & Wang, 1989
- Sphecosesia lushanensis Xu & Liu, 1999
- Sphecosesia nonggangensis Yang & Wang, 1989
- Synanthedon auripes (Hampson, 1892)
- Synanthedon auriplena (Walker, 1964)
- Synanthedon bicingulata Staudinger, 1887
- Synanthedon castanevora Yang & Wang, 1989
- Synanthedon concavifascia Le Cerf, 1916
- Synanthedon culiciformis (Linnaeus, 1758)
- Synanthedon hector (Butler, 1878)
- Synanthedon heilongjiangana Zhang, 1987
- Synanthedon hippophae Xu, Jin & Liu, 1997
- Synanthedon hongye Yang, 1977
- Synanthedon howqua (Moore, 1877)
- Synanthedon hunanensis Xu & Liu, 1992
- Synanthedon jinghongensis Yang & Wang, 1989
- Synanthedon kunmingensis Yang & Wang, 1989
- Synanthedon leucocyanea Zukowsky, 1929
- Synanthedon melli (Zukowsky, 1929)
- Synanthedon menglaensis Yang & Wang, 1989
- Synanthedon moganensis Yang & Wang, 1992
- Synanthedon moupinicola Dalla Torre & Strand, 1925
- Synanthedon mushana (Matsumura, 1931)
- Synanthedon sassafras Xu, 1997
- Synanthedon scoliaeformis (Borkhausen, 1789)
- Synanthedon serica (Alphéraky, 1882)
- Synanthedon sodalis Püngeler, 1912
- Synanthedon tenuis (Butler, 1878)
- Synanthedon tipuliformis (Clerck, 1759)
- Synanthedon ulmicola Yang & Wang, 1989
- Synanthedon unocingulata Bartel, 1912
- Tinthia beijingana Yang, 1977
- Tinthia cuprealis (Moore, 1877)
- Tinthia cupreipennis (Walker, [1865])
- Tinthia varipes Walker, [1865]
- Toleria abiaeformis Walker, 1864
- Toleria sinensis (Walker, 1864)
- Trichocerota brachythyra Hampson, 1919
- Trichocerota dizona Hampson, 1919
- Trichocerota leiaeformis (Walker, 1856)
- Trilochana caseariae Yang & Wang, 1989
- Zenodoxus flavus Xu & Liu, 1992
- Zenodoxus fuscus Xu & Liu, 1992
- Zenodoxus issikii Yano, 1960
- Zenodoxus meilinensis Xu & Liu, 1993
- Zenodoxus rubripectus Xu & Liu, 1993
- Zenodoxus simifuscus Xu & Liu, 1993
- Zenodoxus taiwanellus Matsumura, 1931
- Zenodoxus tianpingensis Xu & Liu, 1993
- Zenodoxus trifasciatus Yano, 1960
- Zhuosesia zhuoxiana Yang, 1977

== Bibliography ==
- Catalogue of the family Sesiidae in China (Lepidoptera: Sesiidae)
