= Pitch moth =

The term pitch moth refers to certain small moths whose caterpillars feed on pines. The feeding action causes the pine tree to shed its resin, which forms pitch-like masses on and under the tree. There are several species of "pitch moths" and not all are closely related:

== In the clearwing moth family (Sesiidae) ==
- Synanthedon pini (pitch mass borer)
- Synanthedon sequoiae (sequoia pitch moth)

== In the snout moth family (Pyralidae) ==
- Dioryctria amatella (southern pine coneworm)

== See also ==
- Dendroctonus (turpentine beetles) which cause similar symptoms
