= Synanthedon leucogaster =

Scientific classification
- Kingdom: Animalia
- Phylum: Arthropoda
- Clade: Pancrustacea
- Class: Insecta
- Order: Lepidoptera
- Family: Sesiidae
- Genus: Synanthedon
- Species: S. leucogaster

Binomial name
- Synanthedon leucogaster (Hampson, 1919)

Synonyms
- Conopia leucogaster Hampson, 1919

Species of moth

Synanthedon leucogaster is a moth of the family Sesiidae. It is known from Gabon.

== Taxonomy ==
Synanthedon leucogaster is the replacement name for Ichneumenoptera albiventris Le Cerf, 1917, secondary homonym of Sesia albiventris Beutenmüller, 1899.
