= Synanthedon beutenmuelleri =

Scientific classification
- Kingdom: Animalia
- Phylum: Arthropoda
- Clade: Pancrustacea
- Class: Insecta
- Order: Lepidoptera
- Family: Sesiidae
- Genus: Synanthedon
- Species: S. beutenmuelleri

Binomial name
- Synanthedon beutenmuelleri Heppner & Duckworth, 1981

Synonyms
- Synanthedon albiventris (Beutenmüller, 1899); Sesia albiventris Beutenmüller, 1899

Species of moth

Synanthedon beutenmuelleri is a moth of the family Sesiidae. It is known from the Republic of the Congo.

== Taxonomy ==
Synanthedon beutenmuelleri is a replacement name for Sesia albiventris Beutenmüller, 1899, since this name was already occupied by Chamaesphecia albiventris.
