= Synanthedon martjanovi =

Scientific classification
- Kingdom: Animalia
- Phylum: Arthropoda
- Clade: Pancrustacea
- Class: Insecta
- Order: Lepidoptera
- Family: Sesiidae
- Genus: Synanthedon
- Species: S. martjanovi

Binomial name
- Synanthedon martjanovi Sheljuzhko, 1918

Synonyms
- Sesia cerceriformis Bremer, 1867

Species of moth

Synanthedon martjanovi is a moth of the family Sesiidae. It is found in Russia and Japan.

The larvae feed on Populus tremula and possibly Populus davidiana.
