= Synanthedon gracilis =

Scientific classification
- Kingdom: Animalia
- Phylum: Arthropoda
- Clade: Pancrustacea
- Class: Insecta
- Order: Lepidoptera
- Family: Sesiidae
- Genus: Synanthedon
- Species: S. gracilis

Binomial name
- Synanthedon gracilis (Hampson, 1910)

Synonyms
- Ichneumenoptera gracilis Hampson, 1910

Species of moth

Synanthedon gracilis is a moth of the family Sesiidae. It is known from Cameroon.
