= Synanthedon rubripicta =

Scientific classification
- Kingdom: Animalia
- Phylum: Arthropoda
- Clade: Pancrustacea
- Class: Insecta
- Order: Lepidoptera
- Family: Sesiidae
- Genus: Synanthedon
- Species: S. rubripicta

Binomial name
- Synanthedon rubripicta Hampson, 1919

Species of moth

Synanthedon rubripicta is a moth of the family Sesiidae. It is known from Sierra Leone.
