= Synanthedon cupreifascia =

Scientific classification
- Kingdom: Animalia
- Phylum: Arthropoda
- Clade: Pancrustacea
- Class: Insecta
- Order: Lepidoptera
- Family: Sesiidae
- Genus: Synanthedon
- Species: S. cupreifascia

Binomial name
- Synanthedon cupreifascia (Miskin, 1892)

Synonyms
- Trochilium cupreifascia Miskin, 1892

Species of moth

Synanthedon cupreifascia is a moth of the family Sesiidae. It is known only from locations near Mackay in Queensland.

The length of the forewings is about 11 mm for females.
