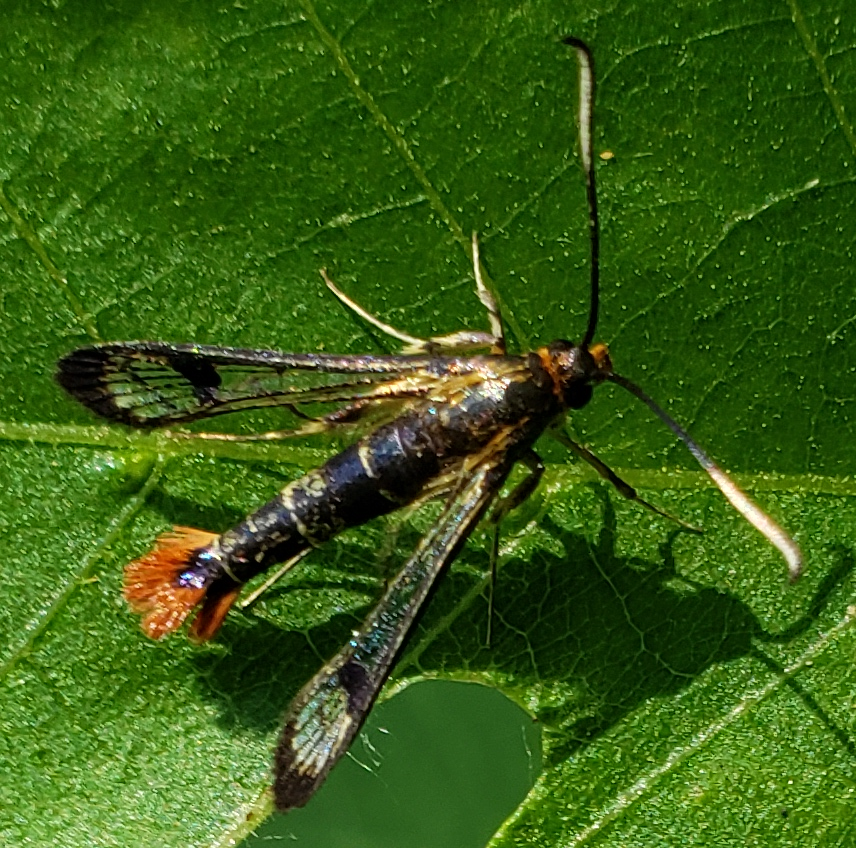

Scientific classification
- Kingdom: Animalia
- Phylum: Arthropoda
- Clade: Pancrustacea
- Class: Insecta
- Order: Lepidoptera
- Family: Sesiidae
- Genus: Synanthedon
- Species: S. acerrubri

Binomial name
- Synanthedon acerrubri Englehardt, 1925

= Synanthedon acerrubri =

Species of moth

Synanthedon acerrubri, commonly known as the red maple borer or the maple clearwing moth, is a species of clearwing borer moth.

== Range ==
Synanthedon acerrubri is found in the Eastern half of the United States and Canada.

== Ecology ==
Synanthedon acerrubri bore into several species of maple tree, especially red maples and sugar maples. They can cause significant damage to maple trees.
