= Synanthedon mesochoriformis =

Scientific classification
- Kingdom: Animalia
- Phylum: Arthropoda
- Clade: Pancrustacea
- Class: Insecta
- Order: Lepidoptera
- Family: Sesiidae
- Genus: Synanthedon
- Species: S. mesochoriformis

Binomial name
- Synanthedon mesochoriformis (Walker, 1856)

Synonyms
- Aegeria mesochoriformis Walker, 1856

Species of moth

Synanthedon mesochoriformis is a moth of the family Sesiidae. It was discovered in South Africa.
