= Synanthedon guineabia =

Scientific classification
- Kingdom: Animalia
- Phylum: Arthropoda
- Clade: Pancrustacea
- Class: Insecta
- Order: Lepidoptera
- Family: Sesiidae
- Genus: Synanthedon
- Species: S. guineabia

Binomial name
- Synanthedon guineabia (Strand, [1913])

Synonyms
- Aegeria guineabia Strand, [1913]; Conopia guineabia

Species of moth

Synanthedon guineabia is a moth of the family Sesiidae. It is known from Equatorial Guinea.
