= Synanthedon uralensis =

Scientific classification
- Kingdom: Animalia
- Phylum: Arthropoda
- Clade: Pancrustacea
- Class: Insecta
- Order: Lepidoptera
- Family: Sesiidae
- Genus: Synanthedon
- Species: S. uralensis

Binomial name
- Synanthedon uralensis (Bartel, 1906)

Synonyms
- Sesia uralensis Bartel, 1906

Species of moth

Synanthedon uralensis is a moth of the family Sesiidae. It is found from Ukraine and southern Russia to Uralsk, Kazakhstan and Mongolia.

The wingspan is about 18 mm.

The larvae possibly feed on Artemisia species.
