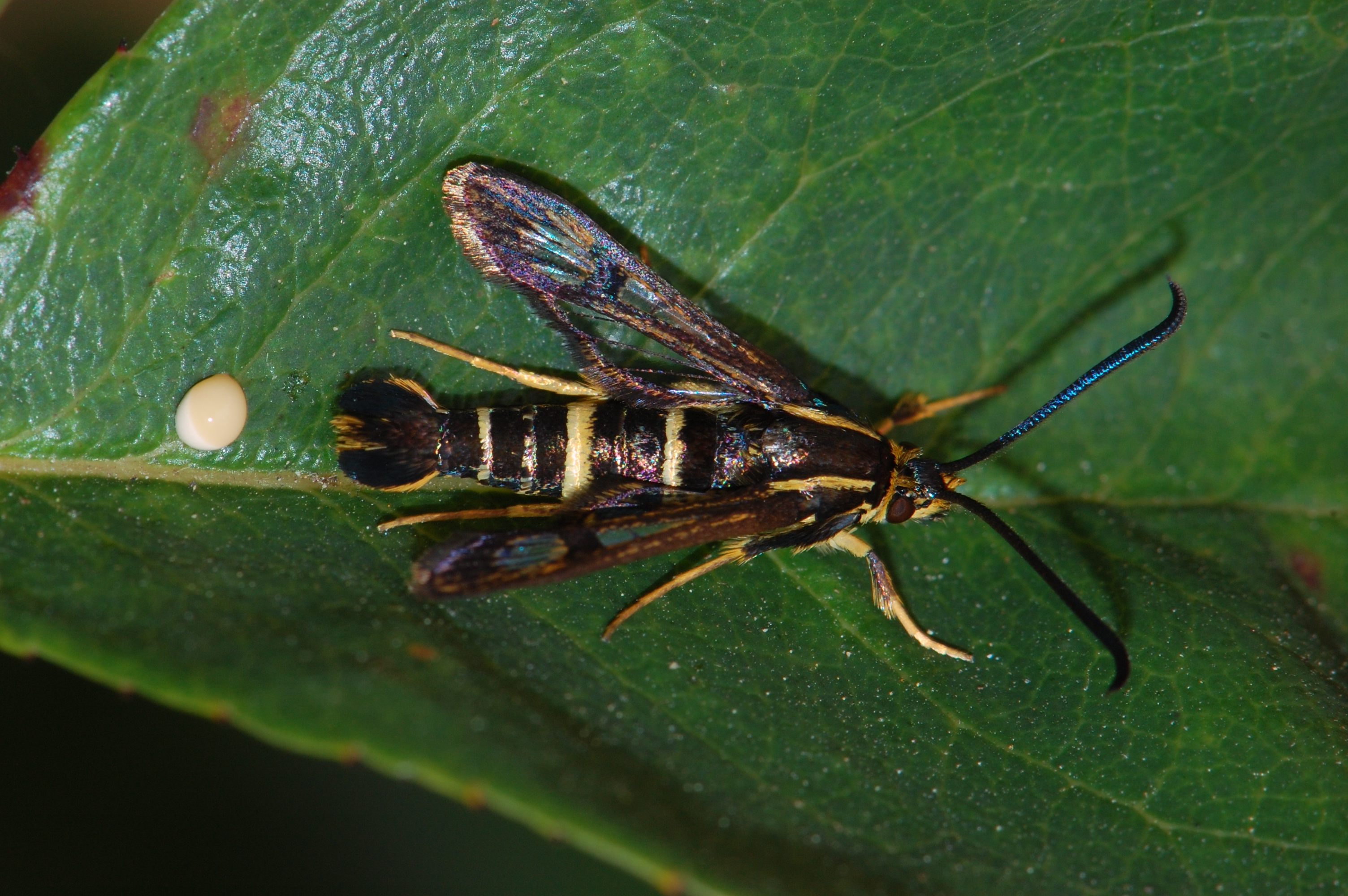
- strawberry crown moth (Synanthedon bibionipennis)

Scientific classification
- Kingdom: Animalia
- Phylum: Arthropoda
- Clade: Pancrustacea
- Class: Insecta
- Order: Lepidoptera
- Family: Sesiidae
- Genus: Synanthedon
- Species: S. bibionipennis

Binomial name
- Synanthedon bibionipennis (Boisduval, 1869)

Synonyms
- Albuna rutilans Edwards, 1881; Aegeria lupini Edwards, 1881; Aegeria perplexa Edwards, 1881; Aegeria impropria Edwards, 1881; Aegeria aureola Edwards, 1881; Aegeria washingtonia Edwards, 1881; Aegeria neglecta Edwards, 1881; Aegeria hemizoniae Edwards, 1881; Aegeria madariae Edwards, 1881; Synanthedon hemizonae

= Synanthedon bibionipennis =

Species of moth

Synanthedon bibionipennis, the strawberry crown moth, is a moth of the family Sesiidae. It is found in western North America from Montana south to Texas westward to the Pacific coast and from British Columbia to California. It is an introduced species in Hawaii.

The wingspan is about 20 mm. Adults are on wing from April to August. There is one generation per year.

The larvae feed on various rose species, including Fragaria, Rosa, Rubus and Potentilla.
