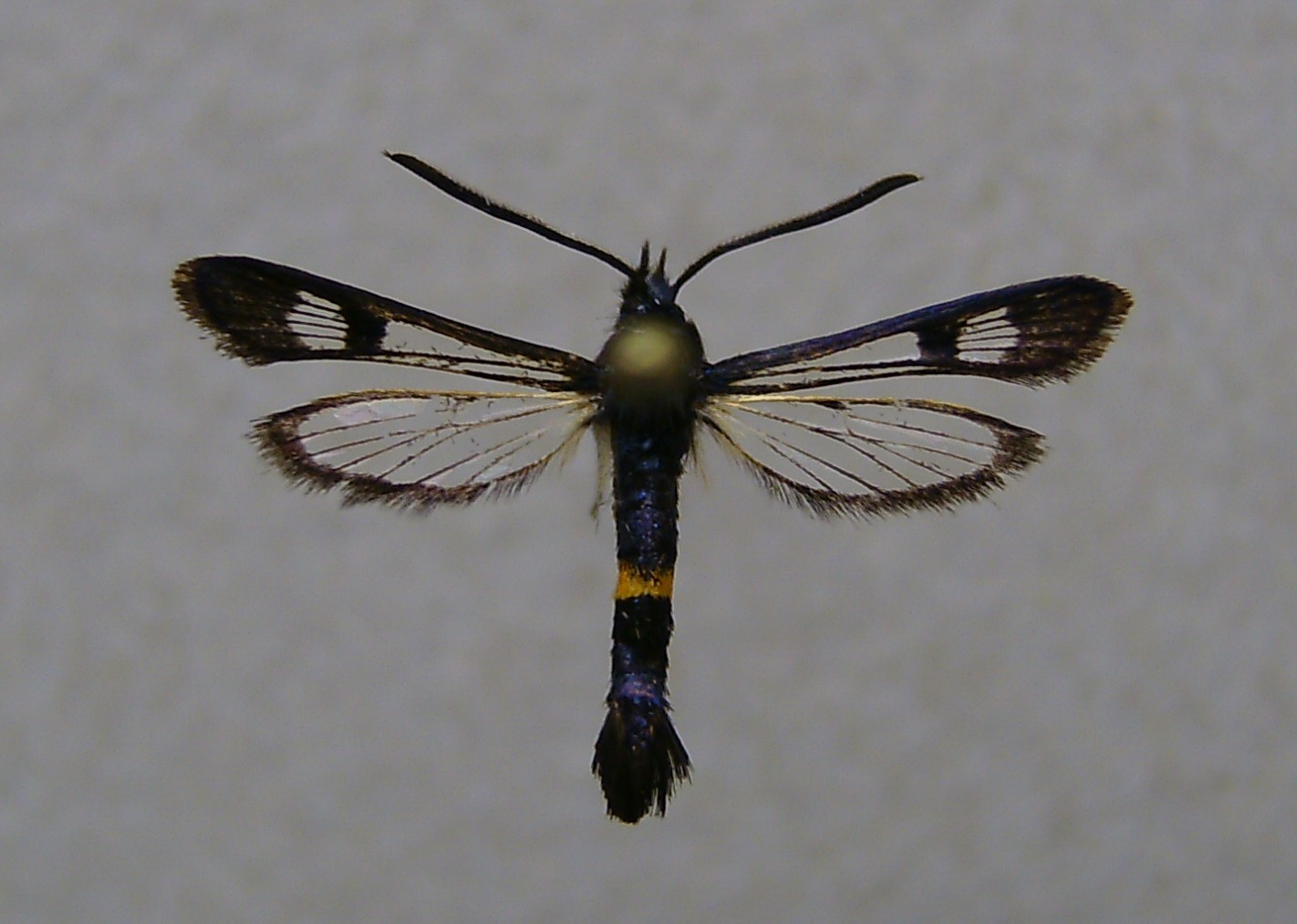

Scientific classification
- Kingdom: Animalia
- Phylum: Arthropoda
- Clade: Pancrustacea
- Class: Insecta
- Order: Lepidoptera
- Family: Sesiidae
- Genus: Synanthedon
- Species: S. soffneri

Binomial name
- Synanthedon soffneri Spatenka, 1983

= Synanthedon soffneri =

Species of moth

Synanthedon soffneri is a moth of the family Sesiidae. It is found in France, Germany, Switzerland, Austria, Poland, the Czech Republic, Slovakia, Slovenia, Finland and Russia.

The wingspan is 22–23 mm.

The larvae feed on Lonicera species, including Lonicera nigra, Lonicera xylosteum and Lonicera tatarica.
