= Synanthedon geranii =

Scientific classification
- Kingdom: Animalia
- Phylum: Arthropoda
- Clade: Pancrustacea
- Class: Insecta
- Order: Lepidoptera
- Family: Sesiidae
- Genus: Synanthedon
- Species: S. geranii

Binomial name
- Synanthedon geranii Kallies, 1997

Species of moth

Synanthedon geranii is a moth of the family Sesiidae. It is found in Greece.

The wingspan is 20–21 mm.

The larvae feed on Geranium macrorrhizum.
