= Synanthedon ferox =

Scientific classification
- Kingdom: Animalia
- Phylum: Arthropoda
- Clade: Pancrustacea
- Class: Insecta
- Order: Lepidoptera
- Family: Sesiidae
- Genus: Synanthedon
- Species: S. ferox

Binomial name
- Synanthedon ferox (Meyrick, 1929)

Synonyms
- Aegeria ferox Meyrick, 1929

Species of moth

Synanthedon ferox is a moth of the family Sesiidae. It is known from Uganda.
