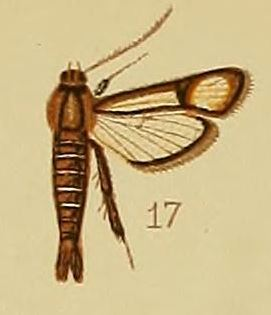

Scientific classification
- Kingdom: Animalia
- Phylum: Arthropoda
- Clade: Pancrustacea
- Class: Insecta
- Order: Lepidoptera
- Family: Sesiidae
- Genus: Synanthedon
- Species: S. flavipalpis

Binomial name
- Synanthedon flavipalpis (Hampson, 1910)

Synonyms
- Lepidopoda flavipalpis Hampson, 1910

= Synanthedon flavipalpis =

Species of moth

Synanthedon flavipalpis is a moth of the family Sesiidae. It is known from Malawi, South Africa and Zambia.
