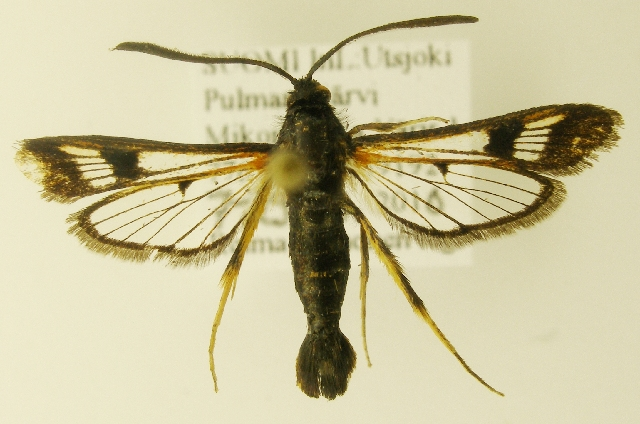

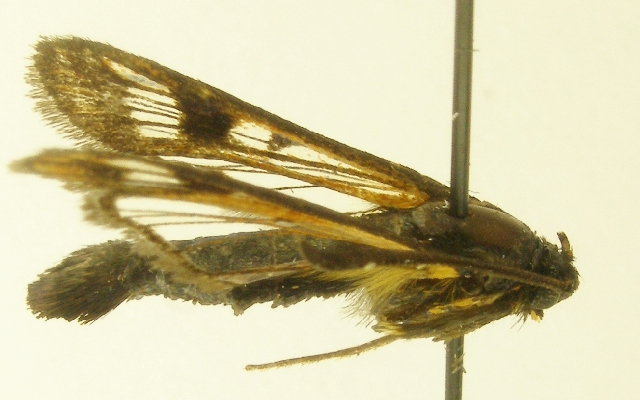

Scientific classification
- Kingdom: Animalia
- Phylum: Arthropoda
- Clade: Pancrustacea
- Class: Insecta
- Order: Lepidoptera
- Family: Sesiidae
- Genus: Synanthedon
- Species: S. polaris

Binomial name
- Synanthedon polaris (Staudinger, 1877)

Synonyms
- Sesia polaris Staudinger, 1877; Sesia aurivillii Lampa, 1883; Sesia rufibasalis Bartel, 1906

= Synanthedon polaris =

Species of moth

Synanthedon polaris is a moth of the family Sesiidae. It is found in the Alps of Switzerland and Italy and in Fennoscandia and northern Russia.

The wingspan is 22–26 mm.

The larvae feed on Salix lapponum, Salix lanata and Salix hastata.
