= Synanthedon melliniformis =

Scientific classification
- Kingdom: Animalia
- Phylum: Arthropoda
- Clade: Pancrustacea
- Class: Insecta
- Order: Lepidoptera
- Family: Sesiidae
- Genus: Synanthedon
- Species: S. melliniformis

Binomial name
- Synanthedon melliniformis (Laspeyres, 1801)

Synonyms
- Sesia melliniformis Laspeyres, 1801; Setia dioctriaeformis Meigen, 1830; Synanthedon mimus Le Cerf, 1922; Aegeria danubica Králícek, 1975; Synanthedon croaticus Kranjcev, 1979

Species of moth

Synanthedon melliniformis is a moth of the family Sesiidae. It is found in France, Italy, Austria, Slovenia, Croatia, Bosnia and Herzegovina, Serbia and Montenegro, Bulgaria, Hungary and Slovakia.

The wingspan is 17–19 mm.

The larvae feed on Salix alba, Populus nigra and Populus alba.
