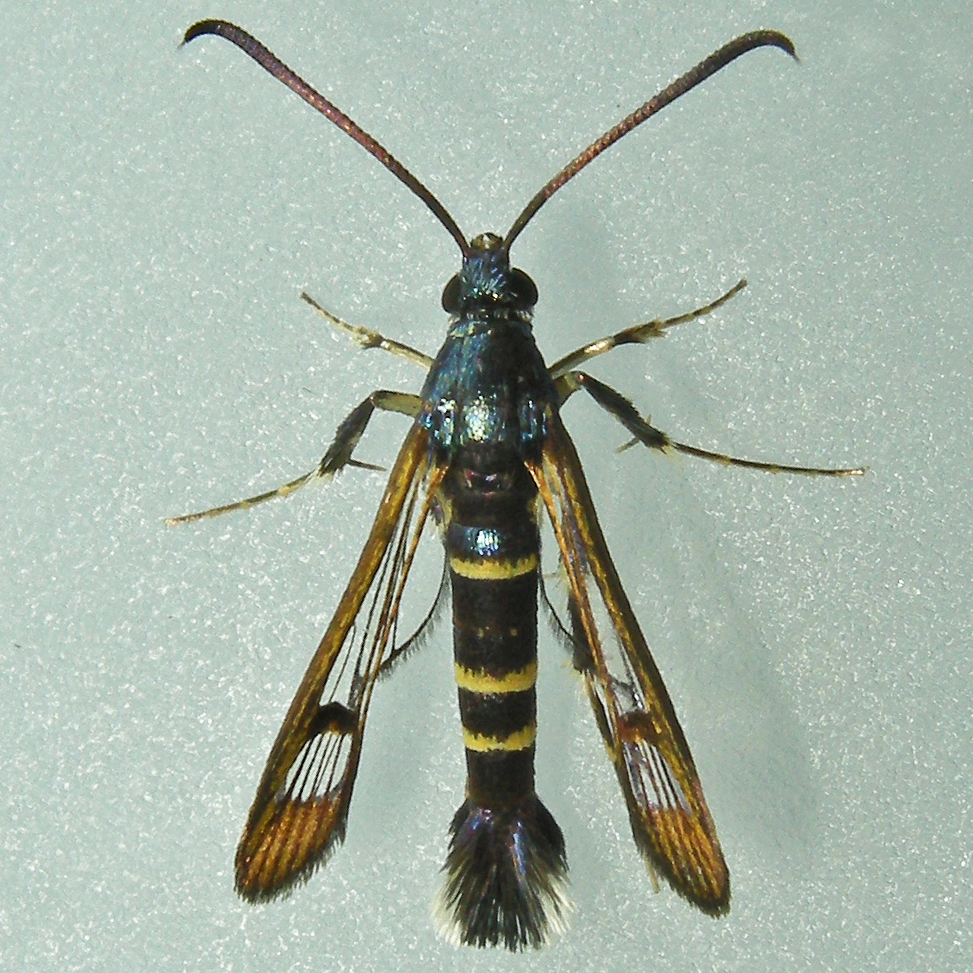

Scientific classification
- Kingdom: Animalia
- Phylum: Arthropoda
- Clade: Pancrustacea
- Class: Insecta
- Order: Lepidoptera
- Family: Sesiidae
- Genus: Synanthedon
- Species: S. rhododendri

Binomial name
- Synanthedon rhododendri Beutenmüller, 1909

= Synanthedon rhododendri =

Species of insect

Synanthedon rhododendri, also known by its common name rhododendron borer moth, is a species from the genus Synanthedon.

== Description ==
Synanthedon rhododendri is one of the smallest of North American Sesiidae, with a length of both sexes between 10 and 15 mm. The moth is a diurnal flying cIearwing moth that is found along the Atlantic Coast of the United States.

== Ecology ==
The moth is capable of inflicting serious injury to Rhododendron and occasionally also to mountain-laurel (Kalmia latifolia) when the latter grows in association with Rhododendron. Twigs and small branches are preferably attacked, the larvae subsisting chiefly on the soft pith, digging long tunnels, which are filled with small, reddish pellets and serve for wintering and for pupation in spring. On larger and older parts of the shrubs the larvae bore under the bark, which peels off, exposing shallow grooves on the hard wood. A heavy infestation observed in the Brooklyn Botanic Garden, in 1918, killed many shrubs in new plantings and furnished ample material for rearing. Moths, exceeded in numbers by ichneumonoid parasites, emerged late in May and during June. Woodpeckers, drilling for the insects, added to the injury, although with ultimately beneficial results.
