= Synanthedon platyuriformis =

Scientific classification
- Kingdom: Animalia
- Phylum: Arthropoda
- Clade: Pancrustacea
- Class: Insecta
- Order: Lepidoptera
- Family: Sesiidae
- Genus: Synanthedon
- Species: S. platyuriformis

Binomial name
- Synanthedon platyuriformis (Walker, 1856)

Synonyms
- Aegeria platyuriformis Walker, 1856

Species of moth

Synanthedon platyuriformis is a moth of the family Sesiidae. It is known from South Africa.
