= Synanthedon alenica =

Scientific classification
- Kingdom: Animalia
- Phylum: Arthropoda
- Clade: Pancrustacea
- Class: Insecta
- Order: Lepidoptera
- Family: Sesiidae
- Genus: Synanthedon
- Species: S. alenica

Binomial name
- Synanthedon alenica (Strand, [1913])

Synonyms
- Trochilium alenica Strand, [1913]; Aegeria alenicum; Synanthedon alenicum

Species of moth

Synanthedon alenica is a moth of the family Sesiidae. It is known from Equatorial Guinea.
