= Synanthedon rubiana =

Scientific classification
- Kingdom: Animalia
- Phylum: Arthropoda
- Clade: Pancrustacea
- Class: Insecta
- Order: Lepidoptera
- Family: Sesiidae
- Genus: Synanthedon
- Species: S. rubiana

Binomial name
- Synanthedon rubiana Kallies, Petersen & Riefenstahl, 1998

Species of moth

Synanthedon rubiana is a moth of the family Sesiidae. It is found in southern Greece and Turkey.

The larvae possibly feed on Artemisia species.
