= Synanthedon pyrethra =

Scientific classification
- Kingdom: Animalia
- Phylum: Arthropoda
- Clade: Pancrustacea
- Class: Insecta
- Order: Lepidoptera
- Family: Sesiidae
- Genus: Synanthedon
- Species: S. pyrethra

Binomial name
- Synanthedon pyrethra (Hampson, 1910)

Synonyms
- Sciapteron pyrethra Hampson, 1910; Alonina pyrethra

Species of moth

Synanthedon pyrethra is a moth of the family Sesiidae. It is known from South Africa.
