= Synanthedon xanthopyga =

Scientific classification
- Kingdom: Animalia
- Phylum: Arthropoda
- Clade: Pancrustacea
- Class: Insecta
- Order: Lepidoptera
- Family: Sesiidae
- Genus: Synanthedon
- Species: S. xanthopyga

Binomial name
- Synanthedon xanthopyga (Aurivillius, 1905)

Synonyms
- Sesia xanthopyga Aurivillius, 1905; Aegeria xanthopyga

Species of moth

Synanthedon xanthopyga is a moth of the family Sesiidae. It is known from western Africa.
