= Synanthedon ethiopica =

Scientific classification
- Kingdom: Animalia
- Phylum: Arthropoda
- Clade: Pancrustacea
- Class: Insecta
- Order: Lepidoptera
- Family: Sesiidae
- Genus: Synanthedon
- Species: S. ethiopica

Binomial name
- Synanthedon ethiopica (Hampson, 1919)

Synonyms
- Chamaesphecia ethiopica Hampson, 1919; Chamaesphecia aethiopica Dalla Torre & Strand, 1925

Species of moth

Synanthedon ethiopica is a moth of the family Sesiidae. It is known from Malawi.
