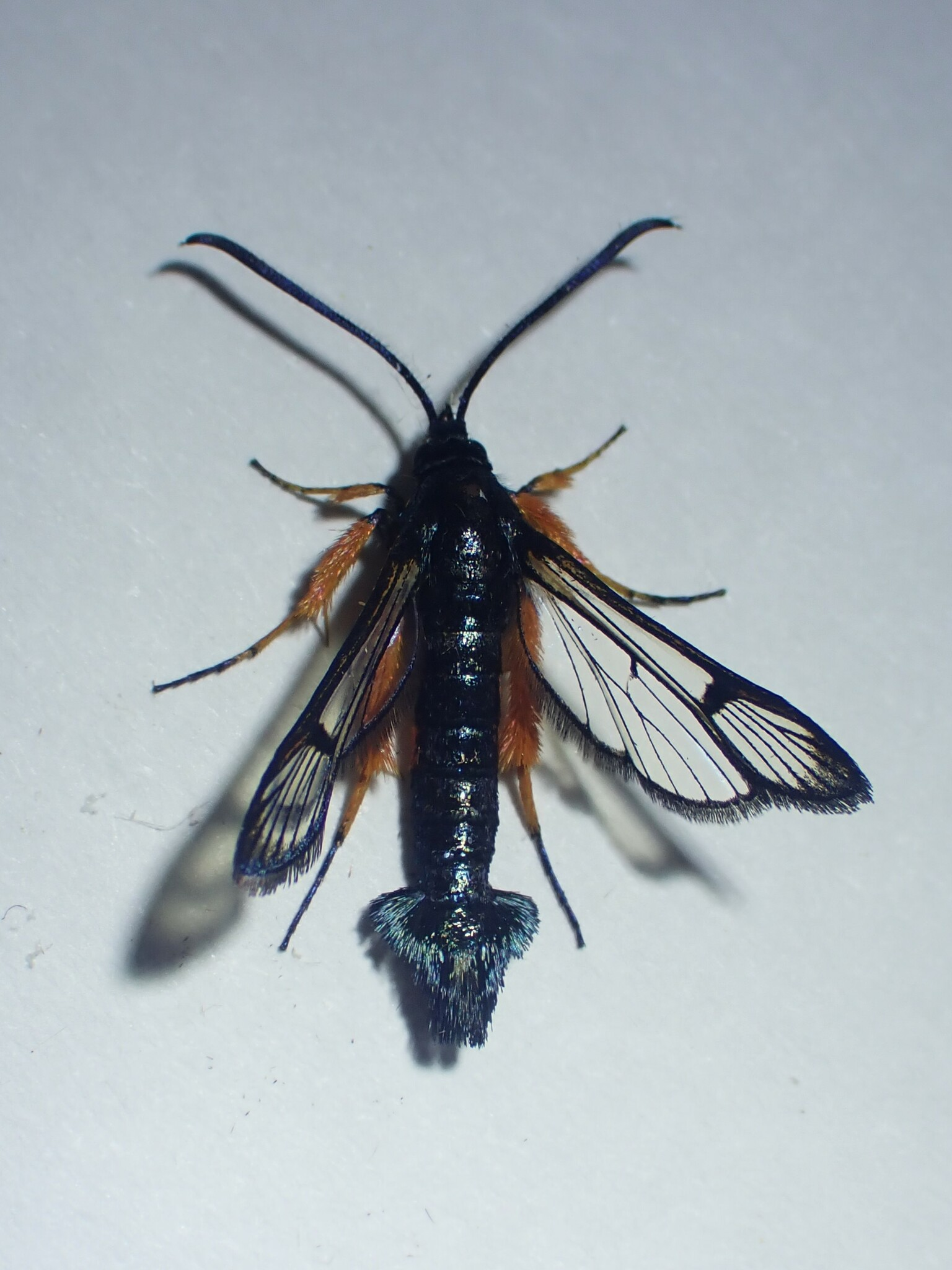

Scientific classification
- Kingdom: Animalia
- Phylum: Arthropoda
- Clade: Pancrustacea
- Class: Insecta
- Order: Lepidoptera
- Family: Sesiidae
- Genus: Synanthedon
- Species: S. fulvipes

Binomial name
- Synanthedon fulvipes (Harris, 1839)

= Synanthedon fulvipes =

Species of moth

Synanthedon fulvipes is a species of moth.
