= Synanthedon maculiventris =

Scientific classification
- Kingdom: Animalia
- Phylum: Arthropoda
- Clade: Pancrustacea
- Class: Insecta
- Order: Lepidoptera
- Family: Sesiidae
- Genus: Synanthedon
- Species: S. maculiventris

Binomial name
- Synanthedon maculiventris Le Cerf, 1916

Synonyms
- Conopia maculiventris (Le Cerf, 1916)

Species of moth

Synanthedon maculiventris is a moth of the family Sesiidae. It is known from Cameroon.
