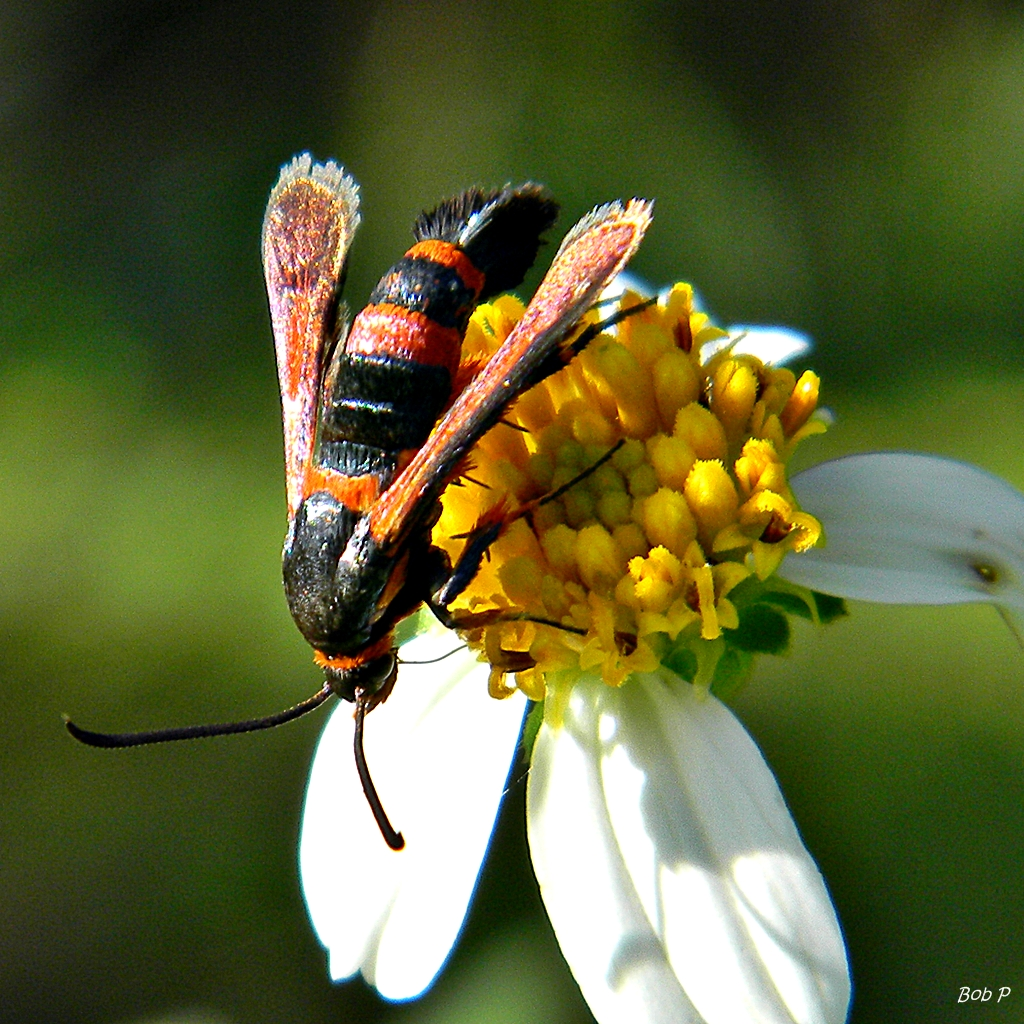

Scientific classification
- Kingdom: Animalia
- Phylum: Arthropoda
- Clade: Pancrustacea
- Class: Insecta
- Order: Lepidoptera
- Family: Sesiidae
- Genus: Synanthedon
- Species: S. sapygaeformis

Binomial name
- Synanthedon sapygaeformis (Walker, 1856)

= Synanthedon sapygaeformis =

Species of moth

Synanthedon sapygaeformis, the Florida oakgall moth, is a species of clearwing moth in the family Sesiidae.
