= Synanthedon squamata =

Scientific classification
- Kingdom: Animalia
- Phylum: Arthropoda
- Clade: Pancrustacea
- Class: Insecta
- Order: Lepidoptera
- Family: Sesiidae
- Genus: Synanthedon
- Species: S. squamata

Binomial name
- Synanthedon squamata (Gaede, 1929)

Synonyms
- Thyranthrene squamata Gaede, 1929

Species of moth

Synanthedon squamata is a moth of the family Sesiidae. It is known from Malawi.
