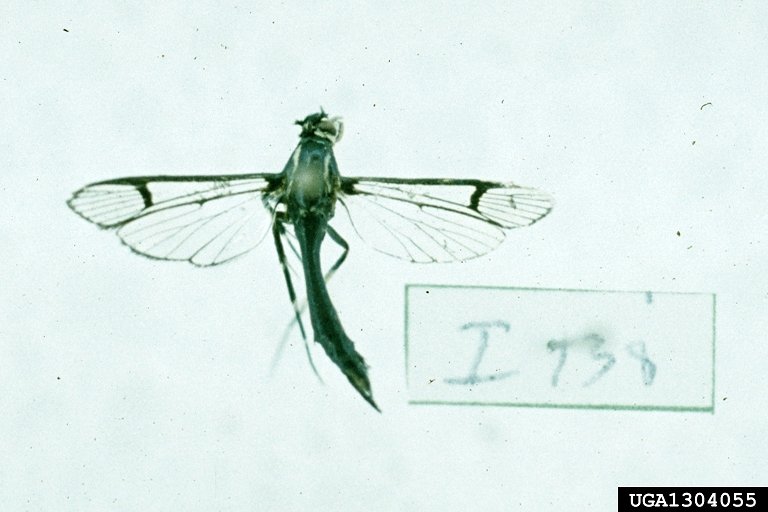

Scientific classification
- Kingdom: Animalia
- Phylum: Arthropoda
- Clade: Pancrustacea
- Class: Insecta
- Order: Lepidoptera
- Family: Sesiidae
- Genus: Synanthedon
- Species: S. pictipes

Binomial name
- Synanthedon pictipes (Grote & Robinson, 1868)

Synonyms
- Aegeria pictipes Grote & Robinson, 1868; Aegeria inusitata Edwards, 1881

= Synanthedon pictipes =

Species of moth

Synanthedon pictipes, the lesser peachtree borer, is a moth of the family Sesiidae. It is known from the eastern half of Canada and the United States westward to Minnesota in the north and eastern Texas in the south.

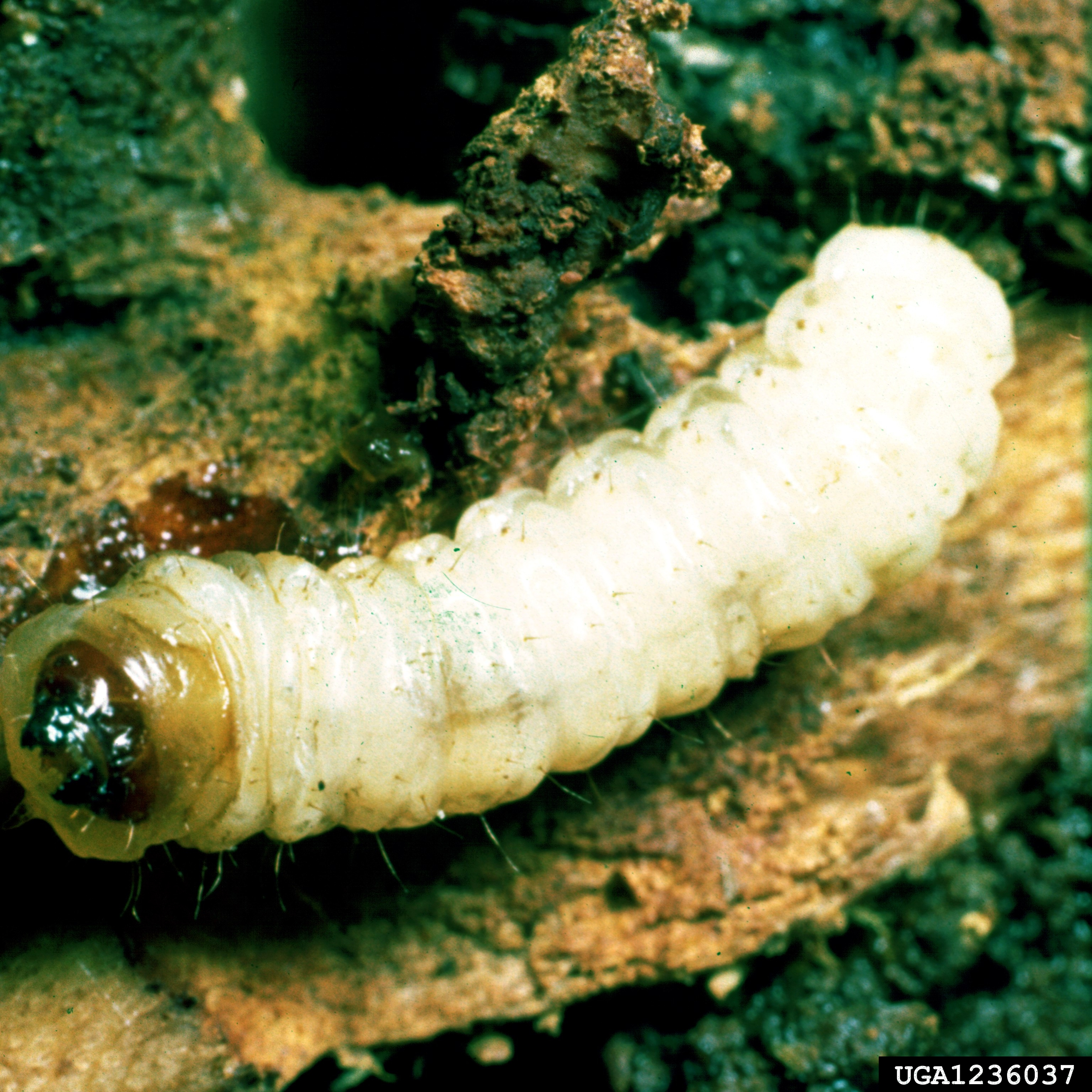
Larva

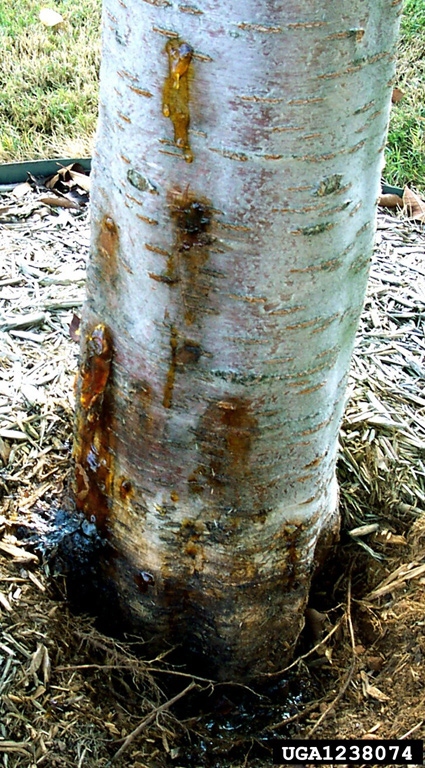
Damage

The wingspan is 18–25 mm.
