= Synanthedon cruciati =

Scientific classification
- Kingdom: Animalia
- Phylum: Arthropoda
- Clade: Pancrustacea
- Class: Insecta
- Order: Lepidoptera
- Family: Sesiidae
- Genus: Synanthedon
- Species: S. cruciati

Binomial name
- Synanthedon cruciati Bettag & Bläsius, R, 2002

Species of moth

Synanthedon cruciati is a moth of the family Sesiidae that is endemic to southern Spain.

The larvae feed on Viscum cruciatum.
