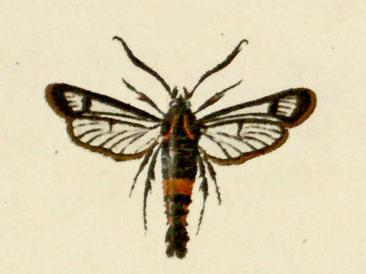

Scientific classification
- Kingdom: Animalia
- Phylum: Arthropoda
- Clade: Pancrustacea
- Class: Insecta
- Order: Lepidoptera
- Family: Sesiidae
- Genus: Synanthedon
- Species: S. stomoxiformis

Binomial name
- Synanthedon stomoxiformis (Hübner, 1790)

Synonyms
- Sphinx stomoxiformis Hübner, 1790; Sphinx stomoxyformis Hübner, 1806; Sphinx culiciformis Scopoli, 1763 (nec Linnaeus, 1758); Sesia amasina Staudinger, 1856

= Synanthedon stomoxiformis =

Species of moth

Synanthedon stomoxiformis is a moth of the family Sesiidae. It is found in most of Europe (except Ireland, Great Britain, the Netherlands, Belgium, Fennoscandia, Estonia and Latvia) and the Middle East.

The wingspan is 22–31 mm. Adults are on wing in June and July.

The larvae feed on the roots of Frangula alnus and Rhamnus cathartica., although there are also records for Mespilus germanica, Juglans regia and Prunus and Quercus species.

== Subspecies ==
- Synanthedon stomoxiformis stomoxiformis (Europe, the Caucasus)
- Synanthedon stomoxiformis riefenstahli Špatenka, 1997 (Spain)
- Synanthedon stomoxiformis amasina (Staudinger, 1856) (Asia Minor, Caucasus, northern Iran)
- Synanthedon stomoxiformis levantina de Freina & Lingenhöle, 2000 (the Levant)
