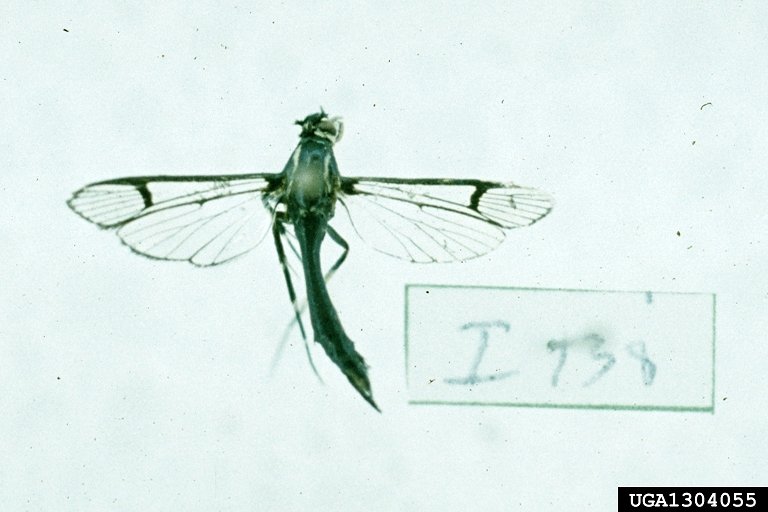
- Synanthedon pictipes

Scientific classification
- Kingdom: Animalia
- Phylum: Arthropoda
- Class: Insecta
- Order: Lepidoptera
- Family: Sesiidae
- Subfamily: Sesiinae
- Tribe: Synanthedonini
- Genus: Synanthedon; Hübner, [1819]

Species
- See text

Synonyms
- Sanninoidea Beutenmüller, 1899

= Synanthedon =

Genus of moths

Synanthedon is a genus of moths in the family Sesiidae.

== Species ==
- Synanthedon acerni (Clemens, 1860)
- Synanthedon acerrubri Engelhardt, 1925
- Synanthedon aequalis (Walker, [1865])
- Synanthedon aericincta (Meyrick, 1928)
- Synanthedon africana (Le Cerf, 1917)
- Synanthedon albicornis (Edwards, 1881)
- Synanthedon alenica (Strand, [1913])
- Synanthedon alleri (Engelhardt, 1946)
- Synanthedon andrenaeformis (Laspeyres, 1801)
  - Synanthedon andrenaeformis andrenaeformis (Laspeyres, 1801)
  - Synanthedon andrenaeformis tenuicingulata Špatenka, 1997
- Synanthedon anisozona (Meyrick, 1918)
- Synanthedon apicalis (Walker, [1865])
- Synanthedon arctica (Beutenmüller, 1900)
- Synanthedon arizonensis (Beutenmüller, 1916)
- Synanthedon arkansasensis Duckworth & Eichlin, 1973
- Synanthedon astyarcha (Meyrick, 1930)
- Synanthedon aulograpta (Meyrick, 1934)
- Synanthedon aurania (Druce, 1899)
- Synanthedon auripes (Hampson, 1910a)
- Synanthedon auriplena (Walker, [1865])
- Synanthedon auritincta (Wileman & South, 1918)
- Synanthedon bellatula Wang & Yang, 2002
- Synanthedon beutenmuelleri Heppner & Duckworth, 1981
- Synanthedon bibionipennis (Boisduval, 1869)
- Synanthedon bicingulata (Staudinger, 1887)
- Synanthedon bifenestrata Gaede, 1929
- Synanthedon bolteri (Edwards, 1883)
- Synanthedon bosqi Köhler, 1941
- Synanthedon caeruleifascia (Rothschild, 1911)
- Synanthedon calamis (Druce, 1899)
- Synanthedon canadensis Duckworth & Eichlin, 1973
- Synanthedon cardinalis (Dampf, 1930)
- Synanthedon castaneae (Busck, 1913)
- Synanthedon castanevora Yang & Wang, 1989
- Synanthedon catalina Meyrick, 1926
- Synanthedon caternaulti Strand, 1925
- Synanthedon caucasica Gorbunov, 1986
- Synanthedon cephiformis (Ochsenheimer, 1808)
- Synanthedon cerceriformis (Walker, 1856)
- Synanthedon ceres (Druce, 1883)
- Synanthedon cerskisi Gorbunov, 1994
- Synanthedon cerulipes (Hampson, 1900)
- Synanthedon chalybea (Walker, 1862)
- Synanthedon chlorothyris (Meyrick, 1935)
- Synanthedon chrysidipennis (Boisduval, 1869)
- Synanthedon chrysonympha (Meyrick, 1932)
- Synanthedon cinnamomumvora Wang & Yang, 2002
- Synanthedon cirrhozona Diakonoff, [1968]
- Synanthedon citrura (Meyrick, 1927)
- Synanthedon clavicornis (Walker, [1865])
- Synanthedon codeti (Oberthür, 1881)
- Synanthedon colchidensis Špatenka & Gorbunov, 1992
- Synanthedon concavifascia Le Cerf, 1916
- Synanthedon conopiformis (Esper, 1782)
- Synanthedon cruciati Bettag & Bläsius, 2002
- Synanthedon cubana (Herrich-Schäffer, 1866)
- Synanthedon culiciformis (Linnaeus, 1758)
- Synanthedon cupreifascia (Miskin, 1892)
- Synanthedon cyanescens (Hampson, 1910)
- Synanthedon cyanospira (Meyrick, 1928)
- Synanthedon dasyproctos (Zukowsky, 1936b)
- Synanthedon dasysceles Bradley, 1968
- Synanthedon decipiens (Edwards, 1881)
- Synanthedon dominicki Duckworth & Eichlin, 1973
- Synanthedon drucei Heppner & Duckworth, 1981
- Synanthedon dybowskii (Le Cerf, 1917)
- Synanthedon erythrogama (Meyrick, 1934)
- Synanthedon erythromma Hampson, 1919
- Synanthedon esperi Špatenka & Arita, 1992
- Synanthedon ethiopica (Hampson, 1919)
- Synanthedon exitiosa (Say, 1823)
- Synanthedon exochiformis (Walker, 1856)
- Synanthedon fatifera Hodges, 1963
- Synanthedon ferox (Meyrick, 1929)
- Synanthedon flavicaudata (Moore, 1887)
- Synanthedon flavicincta (Hampson, [1893])
- Synanthedon flavipalpis (Hampson, 1910)
- Synanthedon flavipalpus (Hampson, [1893])
- Synanthedon flavipectus (Hampson, 1910)
- Synanthedon flaviventris (Staudinger, 1883)
- Synanthedon flavostigma Zukowsky, 1936
- Synanthedon formicaeformis (Esper, 1783)
- Synanthedon fukuzumii Špatenka & Arita, 1992
- Synanthedon fulvipes (Harris, 1839)
- Synanthedon gabuna (Beutenmüller, 1899)
- Synanthedon geliformis (Walker, 1856)
- Synanthedon geranii Kallies, 1997
- Synanthedon glyptaeformis (Walker, 1856)
- Synanthedon gracilis (Hampson, 1910)
- Synanthedon guineabia (Strand, [1913])
- Synanthedon hadassa (Meyrick, 1932)
- Synanthedon haemorrhoidalis (Fabricius, 1775)
- Synanthedon haitangvora Yang, 1977
- Synanthedon halmyris (Druce, 1889)
- Synanthedon hector (Butler, 1878)
- Synanthedon heilongjiangana Zhang, 1987 (nomen nudum)
- Synanthedon hela (Druce, 1889)
- Synanthedon helenis (Engelhardt, 1946)
- Synanthedon hemigymna Zukowsky, 1936
- Synanthedon hermione (Druce, 1889)
- Synanthedon hippolyte (Druce, 1889)
- Synanthedon hippophae Xu, 1997
- Synanthedon hongye Yang, 1977
- Synanthedon howqua (Moore, 1877)
- Synanthedon hunanensis Xu & Liu, 1992
- Synanthedon ignifera (Hampson, [1893])
- Synanthedon iris Le Cerf, 1916
- Synanthedon javana Le Cerf, 1916
- Synanthedon kathyae Duckworth & Eichlin, 1977
- Synanthedon kunmingensis Yang & Wang, 1989
- Synanthedon laticincta (Burmeister, 1878)
- Synanthedon laticivora (Meyrick, 1927)
- Synanthedon lecerfi Heppner & Duckworth, 1981
- Synanthedon lemoulti Le Cerf, 1917
- Synanthedon leptomorpha (Meyrick, 1931)
- Synanthedon leptosceles Bradley, 1968
- Synanthedon leucogaster (Hampson, 1919)
- Synanthedon loranthi (Králícek, 1966)
- Synanthedon maculiventris Le Cerf, 1916
- Synanthedon mardia (Druce, 1892)
- Synanthedon martenii Zukowsky, 1936
- Synanthedon martjanovi Sheljuzhko, 1918
- Synanthedon melliniformis (Laspeyres, 1801)
- Synanthedon mellinipennis (Boisduval, 1836)
- Synanthedon menglaensis Yang & Wang, 1989
- Synanthedon mercatrix (Meyrick, 1931)
- Synanthedon mesiaeformis (Herrich-Schäffer, 1846)
- Synanthedon mesochoriformis (Walker, 1856)
- Synanthedon minplebia Wang & Yang, 2002
- Synanthedon modesta (Butler, 1874)
- Synanthedon moganensis Yang & Wang, 1992
- Synanthedon monogama (Meyrick, 1932)
- Synanthedon monozona (Hampson, 1910)
- Synanthedon moupinicola Strand, 1925
- Synanthedon multitarsus Špatenka & Arita, 1992
- Synanthedon mushana (Matsumura, 1931)
- Synanthedon myopaeformis (Borkhausen, 1789)
  - Synanthedon myopaeformis cruentata (Mann, 1859)
  - Synanthedon myopaeformis graeca (Staudinger, 1871)
  - Synanthedon myopaeformis luctuosa (Lederer, 1853)
  - Synanthedon myopaeformis myopaeformis (Borkhausen, 1789)
  - Synanthedon myopaeformis typhiaeformis (Borkhausen, 1789)
- Synanthedon myrmosaepennis (Walker, 1856)
- Synanthedon nannion Bryk, 1953
- Synanthedon nautica (Meyrick, 1932)
- Synanthedon neotropica Heppner & Duckworth, 1981
- Synanthedon novaroensis (Edwards, 1881:199)
- Synanthedon nuba (Beutenmüller, 1899)
- Synanthedon nyanga (Beutenmüller, 1899)
- Synanthedon olenda (Beutenmüller, 1899)
- Synanthedon opiiformis (Walker, 1856)
- Synanthedon orientalis Heppner & Duckworth, 1981
- Synanthedon pamphyla Kallies, 2003
- Synanthedon pauper (Le Cerf, 1916)
- Synanthedon peltastiformis (Walker, 1856)
- Synanthedon peltata (Meyrick, 1932)
- Synanthedon pensilis (Swinhoe, 1892)
- Synanthedon peruviana (Rothschild, 1911)
- Synanthedon phaedrostoma (Meyrick, 1934)
- Synanthedon phasiaeformis (Felder, 1861)
- Synanthedon pictipes (Grote & Robinson, 1868)
- Synanthedon pini (Kellicott, 1881)
- Synanthedon pipiziformis (Lederer, 1855)
- Synanthedon plagiophleps Zukowsky, 1936
- Synanthedon platyuriformis (Walker, 1856)
- Synanthedon polaris (Staudinger, 1877)
- Synanthedon polygoni (Edwards, 1881)
- Synanthedon producta (Matsumura, 1931)
- Synanthedon proserpina (Druce, 1883)
- Synanthedon proxima (Edwards, 1881)
- Synanthedon pseudoscoliaeformis Špatenka & Arita, 1992
- Synanthedon pulchripennis (Walker, [1865])
- Synanthedon pyrethra (Hampson, 1910)
- Synanthedon pyri (Harris, 1830)
- Synanthedon pyrodisca (Hampson, 1910)
- Synanthedon nr pyrostoma (Unknown, Unknown)
- Synanthedon quercus (Matsumura, 1911)
- Synanthedon refulgens (Edwards, 1881)
- Synanthedon resplendens (Edwards, 1881)
- Synanthedon rhodia (Druce, 1899)
- Synanthedon rhododendri (Beutenmüller, 1909)
- Synanthedon rhodothictis (Meyrick, 1918)
- Synanthedon rhyssaeformis (Walker, 1856)
- Synanthedon richardsi (Engelhardt, 1946)
- Synanthedon rileyana (Edwards, 1881)
- Synanthedon romani Bryk, 1953
- Synanthedon rubiana Kallies, Petersen & Riefenstahl, 1998
- Synanthedon rubripalpis (Meyrick, 1932)
- Synanthedon rubripicta Hampson, 1919
- Synanthedon rubrofascia (Edwards, 1881)
- Synanthedon santanna (Kaye, 1925)
- Synanthedon sapygaeformis (Walker, 1856)
- Synanthedon sassafras Xu, 1997
- Synanthedon saxifragae (Edwards, 1881)
- Synanthedon scarabitis (Meyrick, 1921)
- Synanthedon sciophilaeformis (Walker, 1856)
- Synanthedon scitula (Harris, 1839)
- Synanthedon scoliaeformis (Borkhausen, 1789)
  - Synanthedon scoliaeformis japonica Špatenka & Arita, 1992
  - Synanthedon scoliaeformis scoliaeformis (Borkhausen, 1789)
- Synanthedon scythropa Zukowsky, 1936
- Synanthedon sellustiformis (Druce, 1883)
- Synanthedon sequoiae (Edwards, 1881)
- Synanthedon serica (Alpheraky, 1882)
- Synanthedon sigmoidea (Beutenmüller, 1897)
- Synanthedon simois (Druce, 1899)
- Synanthedon sodalis Püngeler, 1912
- Synanthedon soffneri Špatenka, 1983
- Synanthedon spatenkai Gorbunov, 1991
- Synanthedon spheciformis ([Denis & Schiffermüller], 1775)
- Synanthedon sphenodes Diakonoff, [1968]
- Synanthedon spuleri (Fuchs, 1908)
- Synanthedon squamata (Gaede, 1929)
- Synanthedon stenothyris (Meyrick, 1933)
- Synanthedon stomoxiformis (Hübner, 1790)
  - Synanthedon stomoxiformis amasina (Staudinger, 1856)
  - Synanthedon stomoxiformis levantina de Freina & Lingenhöle, 2000
  - Synanthedon stomoxiformis riefenstahli Špatenka, 1997
  - Synanthedon stomoxiformis stomoxiformis (Hübner, 1790)
- Synanthedon subaurata Le Cerf, 1916b
- Synanthedon syriaca Špatenka, 2001
- Synanthedon talischensis (Bartel, 1906)
- Synanthedon tenuis (Butler, 1878)
- Synanthedon tenuiventris Le Cerf, 1916
- Synanthedon tetranoma (Meyrick, 1932)
- Synanthedon theryi Le Cerf, 1916
- Synanthedon tipuliformis (Clerck, 1759)
- Synanthedon tosevskii Špatenka, 1987
- Synanthedon trithyris (Meyrick, 1926)
- Synanthedon tryphoniformis (Walker, 1856)
- Synanthedon ulmicola Yang & Wang, 1989
- Synanthedon unocingulata Bartel, 1912
- Synanthedon uralensis (Bartel, 1906)
- Synanthedon uranauges (Meyrick, 1926)
- Synanthedon velox (Fixsen, 1887)
- Synanthedon ventralis (Druce, 1911)
- Synanthedon versicolor Le Cerf, 1916
- Synanthedon vespiformis (Linnaeus, 1761)
- Synanthedon viburni Engelhardt, 1925
- Synanthedon xanthonympha (Meyrick, 1921)
- Synanthedon xanthopyga (Aurivillius, 1905)
- Synanthedon xanthosoma (Hampson, [1893])
- Synanthedon xanthozonata (Hampson, 1895)
- Synanthedon yanoi Špatenka & Arita, 1992
