= Synanthedon flavipectus =

Scientific classification
- Kingdom: Animalia
- Phylum: Arthropoda
- Clade: Pancrustacea
- Class: Insecta
- Order: Lepidoptera
- Family: Sesiidae
- Genus: Synanthedon
- Species: S. flavipectus

Binomial name
- Synanthedon flavipectus (Hampson, 1910)

Synonyms
- Ichneumenoptera flavipectus Hampson, 1910

Species of moth

Synanthedon flavipectus is a moth of the family Sesiidae. It is known from Ghana.
