= Synanthedon africana =

Scientific classification
- Kingdom: Animalia
- Phylum: Arthropoda
- Clade: Pancrustacea
- Class: Insecta
- Order: Lepidoptera
- Family: Sesiidae
- Genus: Synanthedon
- Species: S. africana

Binomial name
- Synanthedon africana Le Cerf, 1917

Synonyms
- Albuna africana Le Cerf, 1917

Species of moth

Synanthedon africana is a moth of the family Sesiidae. It is known from the African country of Togo.
