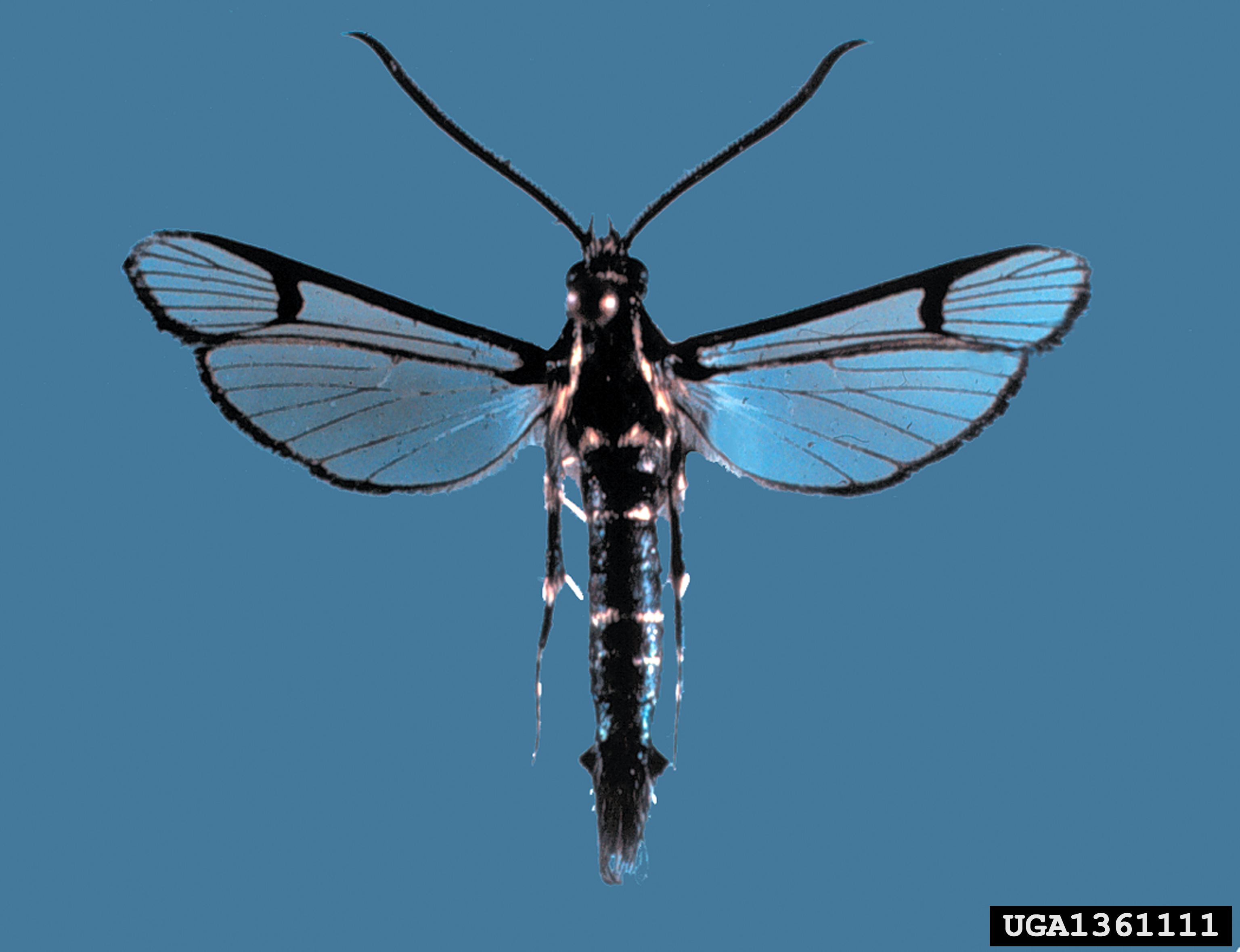

Scientific classification
- Kingdom: Animalia
- Phylum: Arthropoda
- Clade: Pancrustacea
- Class: Insecta
- Order: Lepidoptera
- Family: Sesiidae
- Genus: Synanthedon
- Species: S. exitiosa

Binomial name
- Synanthedon exitiosa Say, 1823

= Synanthedon exitiosa =

Species of moth

Synanthedon exitiosa, the peachtree borer, is a species of moth in the family Sesiidae that is native to North America.

The adult female of the species has a wingspan of about 3.5 centimeters. It is dark metallic blue in color with an orange band around the abdomen. It has opaque forewings and clear hindwings. The male is smaller and more slender, and both pairs of wings are clear. The larva is up to 3.5 centimeters long and white with a brown head.

The host plants are trees and shrubs of the genus Prunus, such as peach, cherry, and apricot. The female lays eggs around the base of the trunk, and the larvae bore into it. They feed on the cambium, producing damage so severe that it often kills the tree.

== Gallery ==
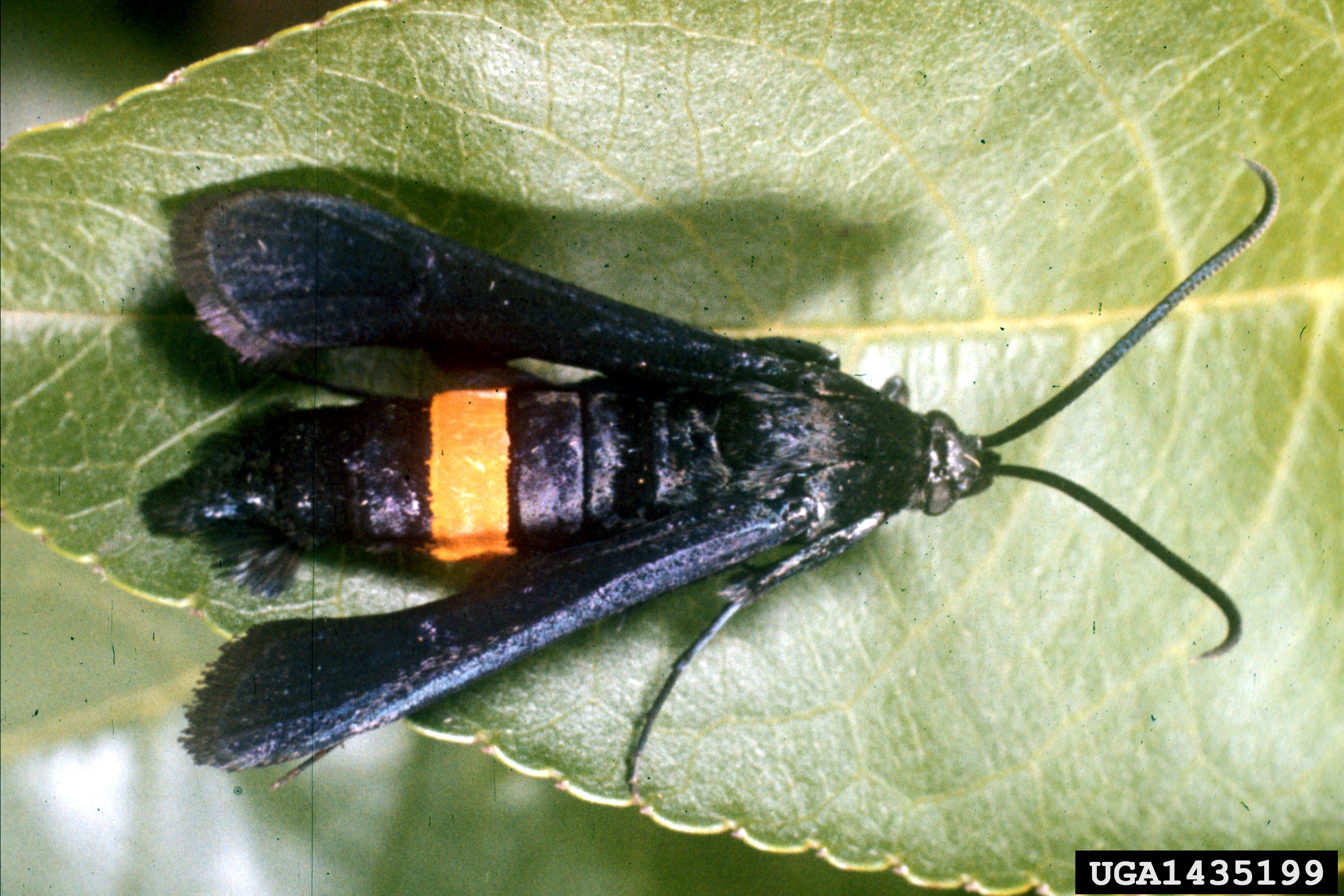
Adult

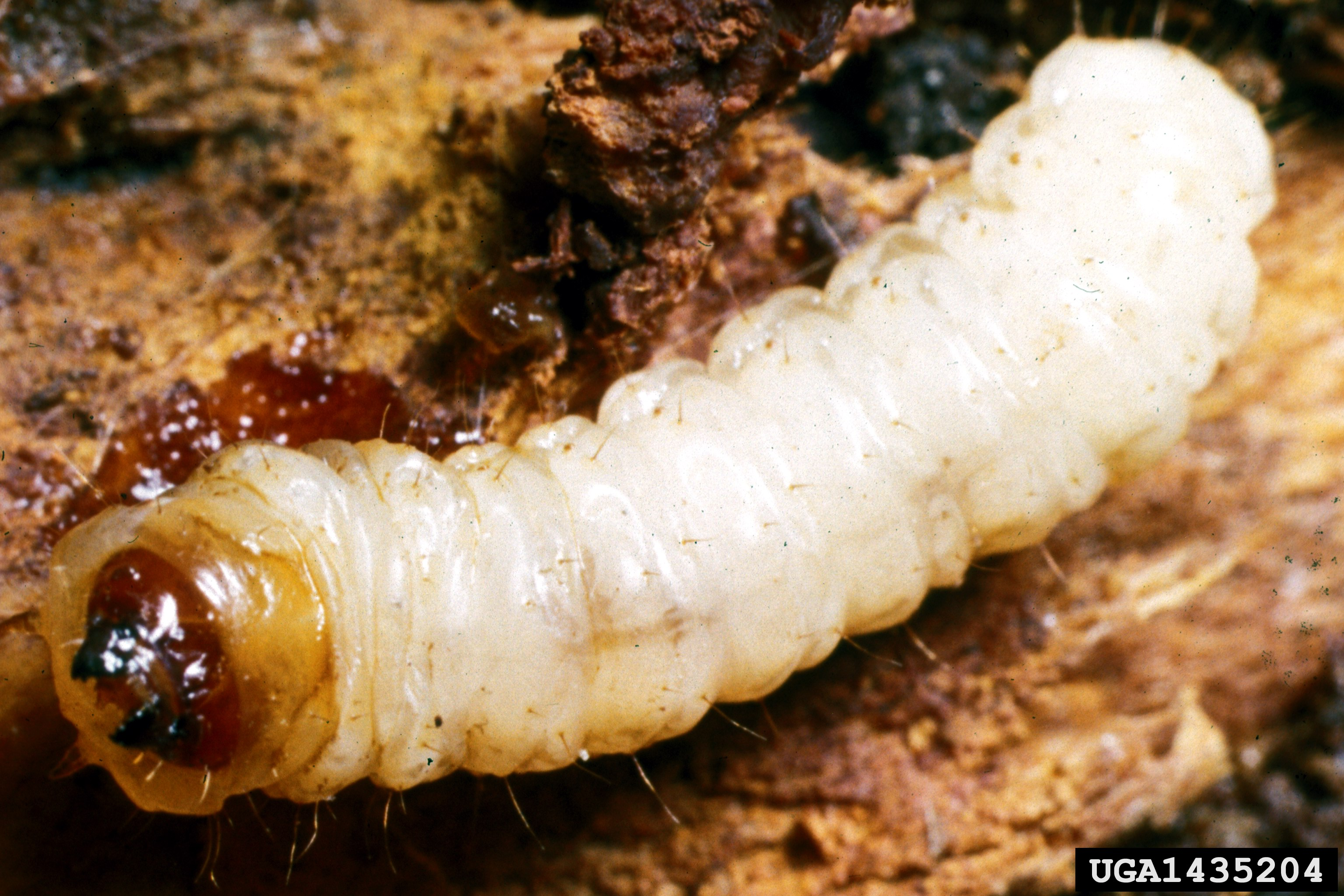
Caterpillar

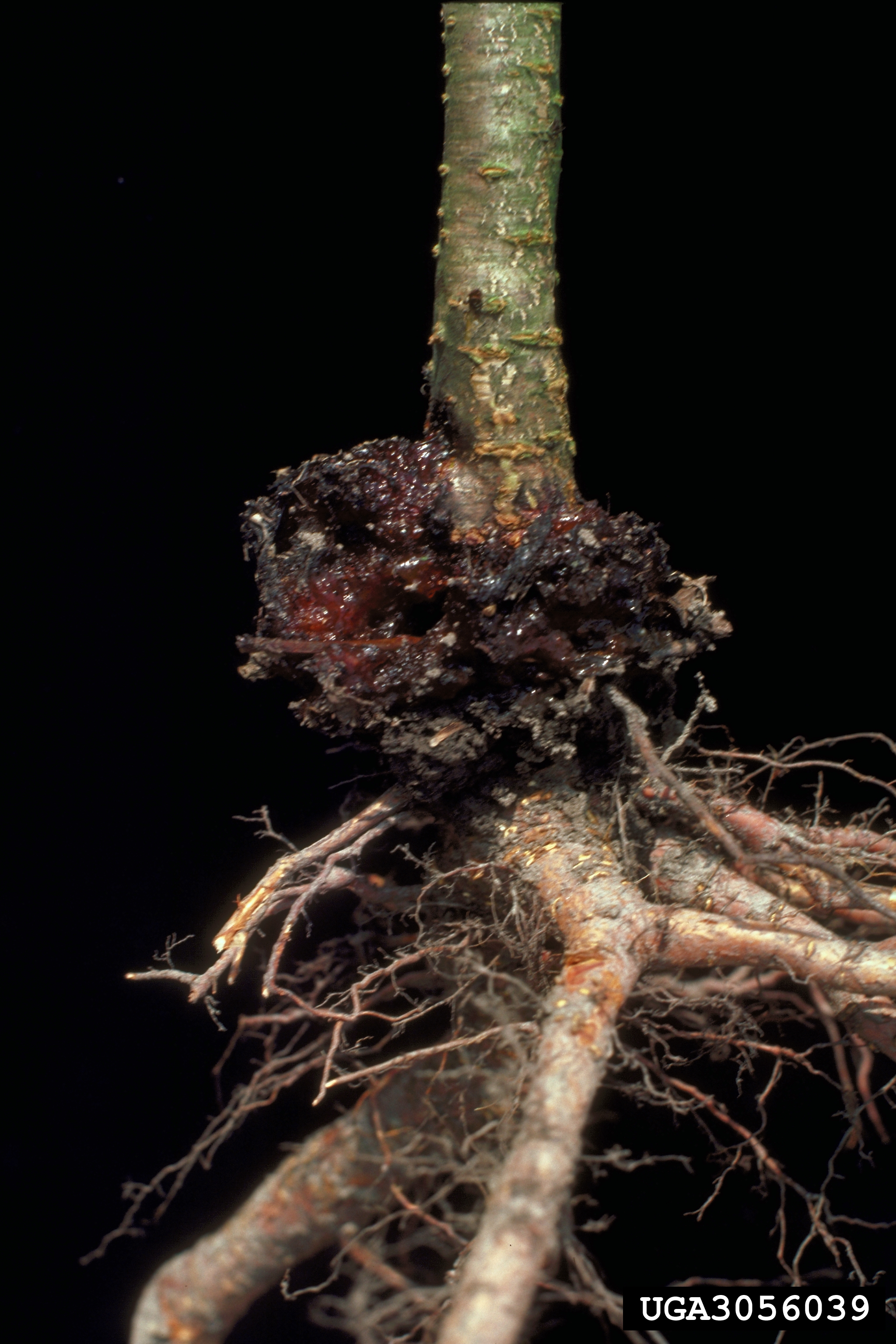
Damage
