= Synanthedon pauper =

Scientific classification
- Kingdom: Animalia
- Phylum: Arthropoda
- Clade: Pancrustacea
- Class: Insecta
- Order: Lepidoptera
- Family: Sesiidae
- Genus: Synanthedon
- Species: S. pauper

Binomial name
- Synanthedon pauper (Le Cerf, 1916)

Synonyms
- Sylphidia pauper Le Cerf, 1916; Conopia pauper

Species of moth

Synanthedon pauper is a moth of the family Sesiidae. It is known from Cameroon.
