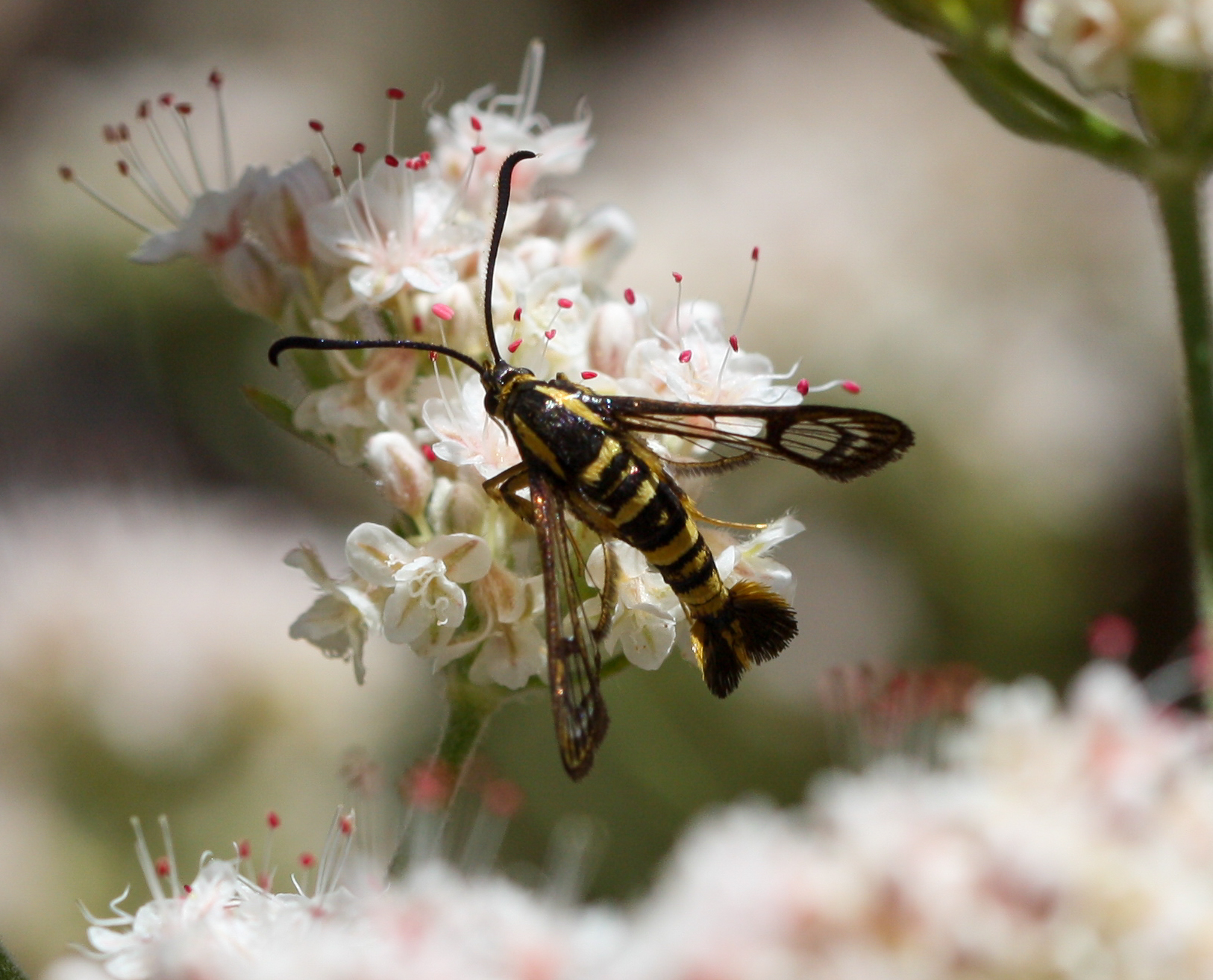
- Sycamore clearwing moth nectaring on wild buckwheat, San Bernardino County, California, May 2022

Scientific classification
- Kingdom: Animalia
- Phylum: Arthropoda
- Clade: Pancrustacea
- Class: Insecta
- Order: Lepidoptera
- Family: Sesiidae
- Genus: Synanthedon
- Species: S. resplendens

Binomial name
- Synanthedon resplendens Hy. Edwards, 1881

Synonyms
- Albuna resplendens

= Synanthedon resplendens =

Sycamore clearwing moth

North American clearwing moth

Synanthedon resplendens, also known as the sycamore borer moth, is species of a clearwing moth native to western North America. Larva of this moth live under the bark of sycamore, ceanothus, coast live oak, and, on rare occasions, avocado trees. Sycamore hosts include California sycamore, Arizona sycamore, and American sycamore trees. Coast live oak is a confirmed host, but this moth likely uses many or most other western oaks as well.

== Description ==
=== Adult ===
The coloration of the adult moths mimics the coloration of a vespid wasp. Their movements may also be reminiscent of wasps, with "intermittent rapid running and fluttering of wings".

Adults are mostly yellow with black markings on the thorax and abdomen. Sycamore borer moths typically have a brownish black or bluish black head and antennae, yellow palpi, and a yellow collar, with a blue-black thorax that has nearly parallel yellow lines on the sides.

This moth's wings are mostly transparent, with yellow- to orange-colored borders. The forewings have iridescent blue-black veins and yellow scales on the apical cells; the hindwings are completely transparent with brownish black fringes and inner yellow scales. The wingspan of the moth is about 18–24 mm (0.71–0.94 in) across.

This species is sexually dimorphic; females are larger than males.

=== Eggs, pupae, larvae ===
Egg color is gold or pink. The eggs are about .8 mm (0.031 in) long, ovoid, and have a slightly reticulated (net-like) appearance or texture.

Pupae are about 10 mm (0.39 in), are found in white to brownish silken cocoons, and are a "shining mahogany brown".

Larvae are pinkish to whitish and reach 18 mm (0.71 in) in length; the head is reddish brown.

== Life cycle ==
One generation occurs per year. Adults emerge and are on the wing from May through early August, with greatest emergence in June and July.

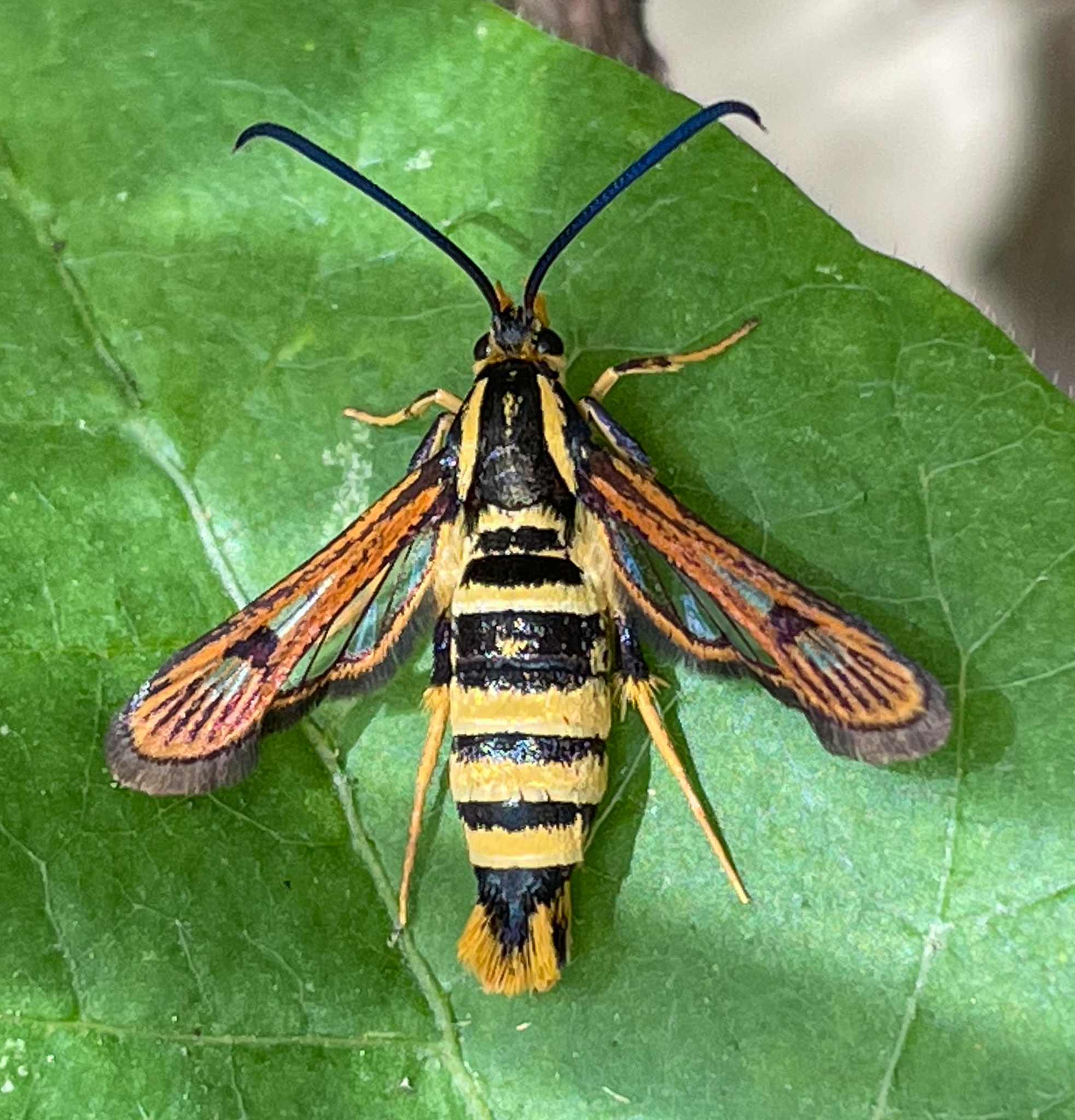
Sycamore clearwing, Sonoma County, California, June 2021

The adults only live for about a week, during which time the ovoid, gold-colored eggs are laid singly on the bark in small cracks or depressions. Old or slow-growing trees and injured tissues are favored sites for egg laying and feeding. Larvae rarely damage the cambium or feed in the wood. Pupae are formed just below the bark surface, and protrude through the bark when the adult is ready to emerge. Larvae mine the bark below the surface, producing numerous serpentine feeding tunnels. Reddish sawdust-like frass, which larvae expel from tunnels, accumulates in branch crotches or on the ground below the infested area. The outer bark surface over the tunnels becomes roughened after repeated infestations and may produce wet ooze. Larval galleries are most often around the base and the lower trunk of the tree, but may be found in branches up to 9 m (30 ft) above the ground. The tunnels can extend over 100 cm^{2} (16 sq in). Overwintering occurs as larvae or pupae within the bark tunnels.

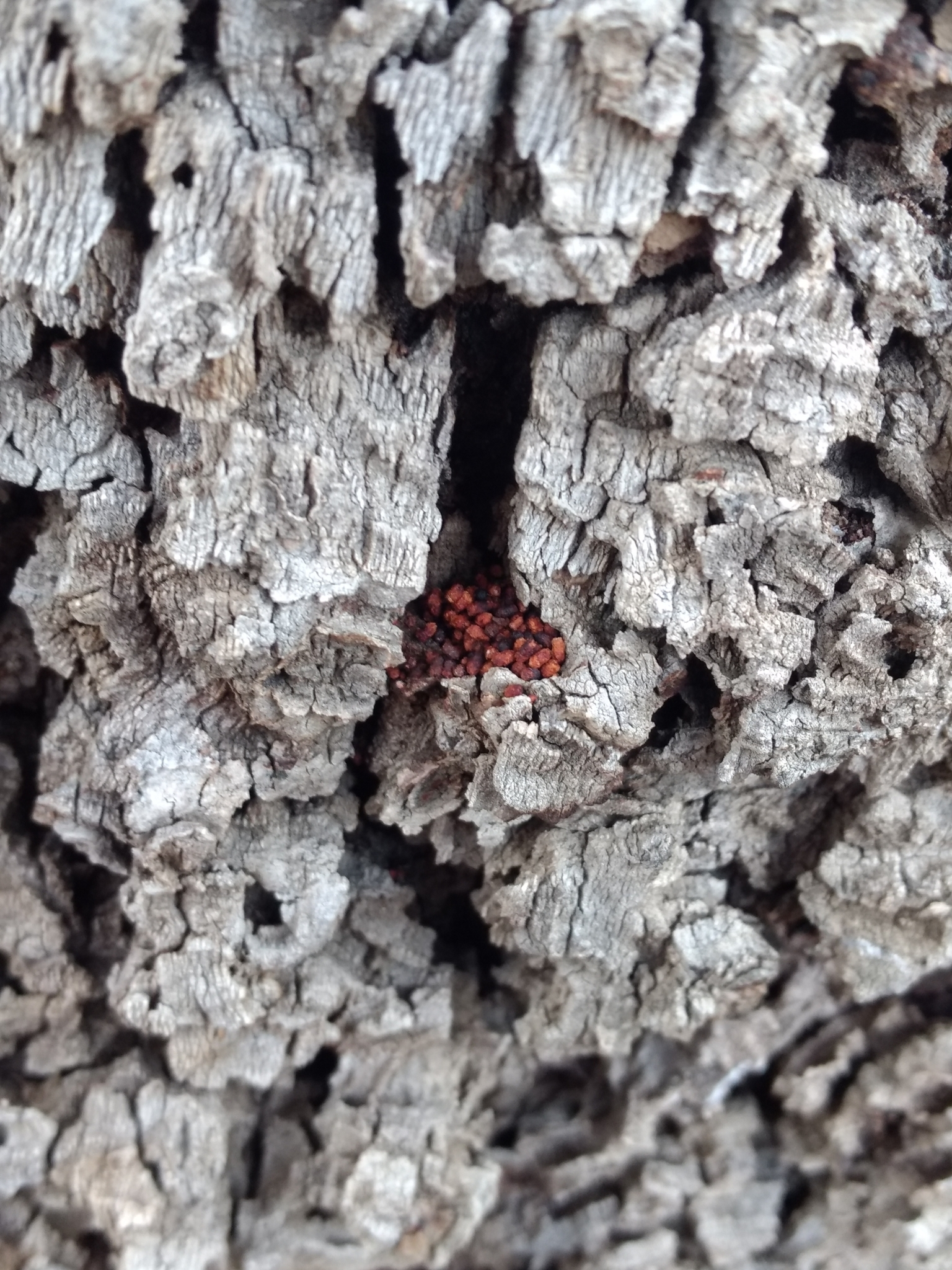
Larva expel reddish frass from the bark galleries

Pupal skins may be visible in emergence holes. Emergence holes are round, 3 mm (0.12 in) to 6 mm in diameter, and in oak trees are found exclusively in bark cracks.

== Geographic range ==
The sycamore clearwing moth is found throughout California, into the north as far as Yukon, and at least as far east as New Mexico. The ceanothus clearwing, Synanthedon mellinipennis, overlaps somewhat in range and uses a similar catalog of host plants.

== Impact ==
According to the University of California Integrated Pest Management program, "Sycamores tolerate extensive boring by this insect, and generally no control is recommended." According to the U.S. Forest Service, even though the superficial damage to trees by this species may be deemed unsightly "the amount of damage caused by this insect is generally considered to be of minor importance".
