= Synanthedon flavicaudata =

Scientific classification
- Kingdom: Animalia
- Phylum: Arthropoda
- Clade: Pancrustacea
- Class: Insecta
- Order: Lepidoptera
- Family: Sesiidae
- Genus: Synanthedon
- Species: S. flavicaudata

Binomial name
- Synanthedon flavicaudata (Moore, 1887)

Synonyms
- Conopia flavicaudata Moore, 1887

Species of moth

Synanthedon flavicaudata is a moth of the family Sesiidae first described by Frederic Moore in 1887. It is found in India and Sri Lanka.
