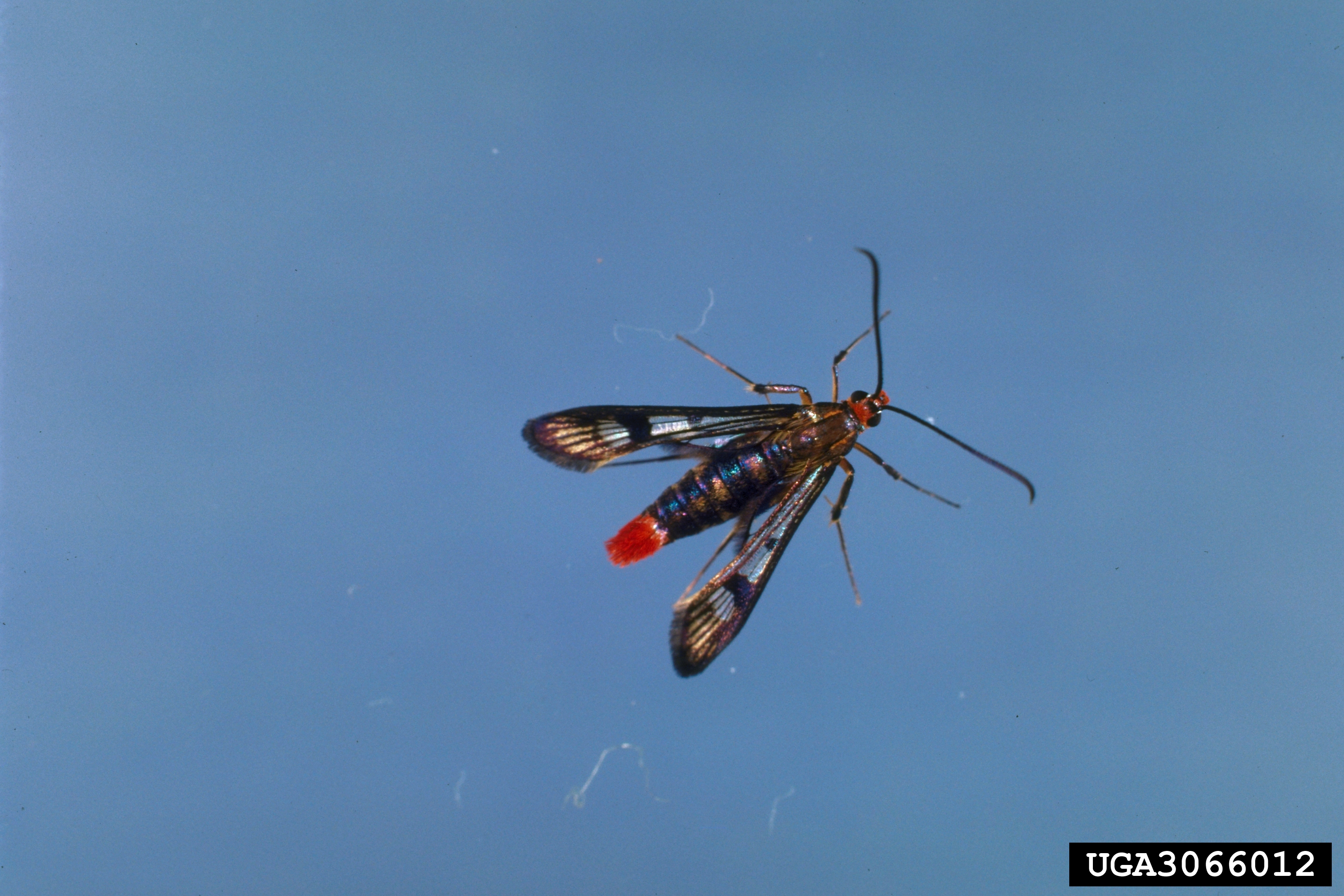

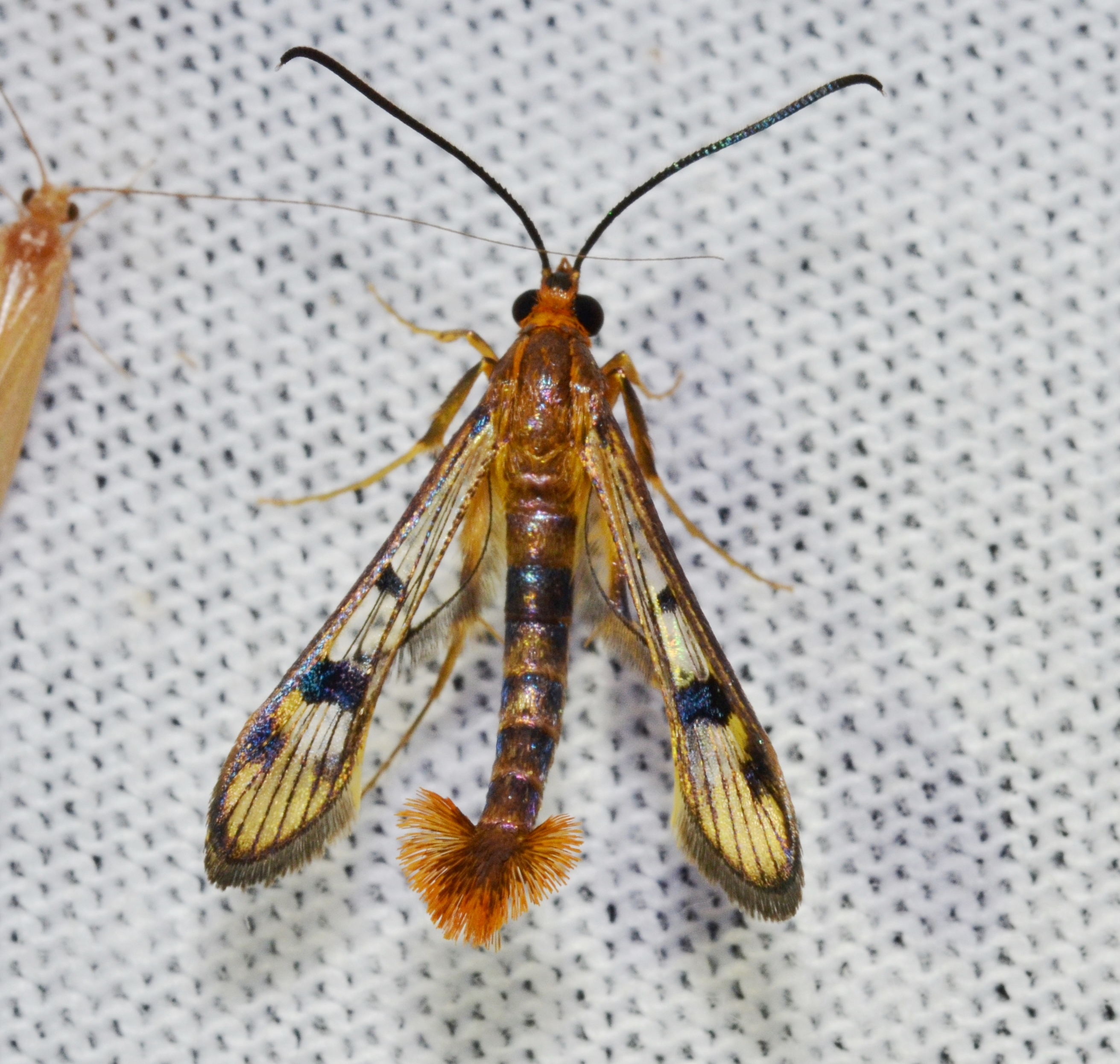

Scientific classification
- Kingdom: Animalia
- Phylum: Arthropoda
- Clade: Pancrustacea
- Class: Insecta
- Order: Lepidoptera
- Family: Sesiidae
- Genus: Synanthedon
- Species: S. acerni

Binomial name
- Synanthedon acerni Clemens, 1860

= Synanthedon acerni =

Species of moth

Synanthedon acerni, the maple callus borer, is a moth of the family Sesiidae. It is found in Eastern Canada and much of the Eastern United States.

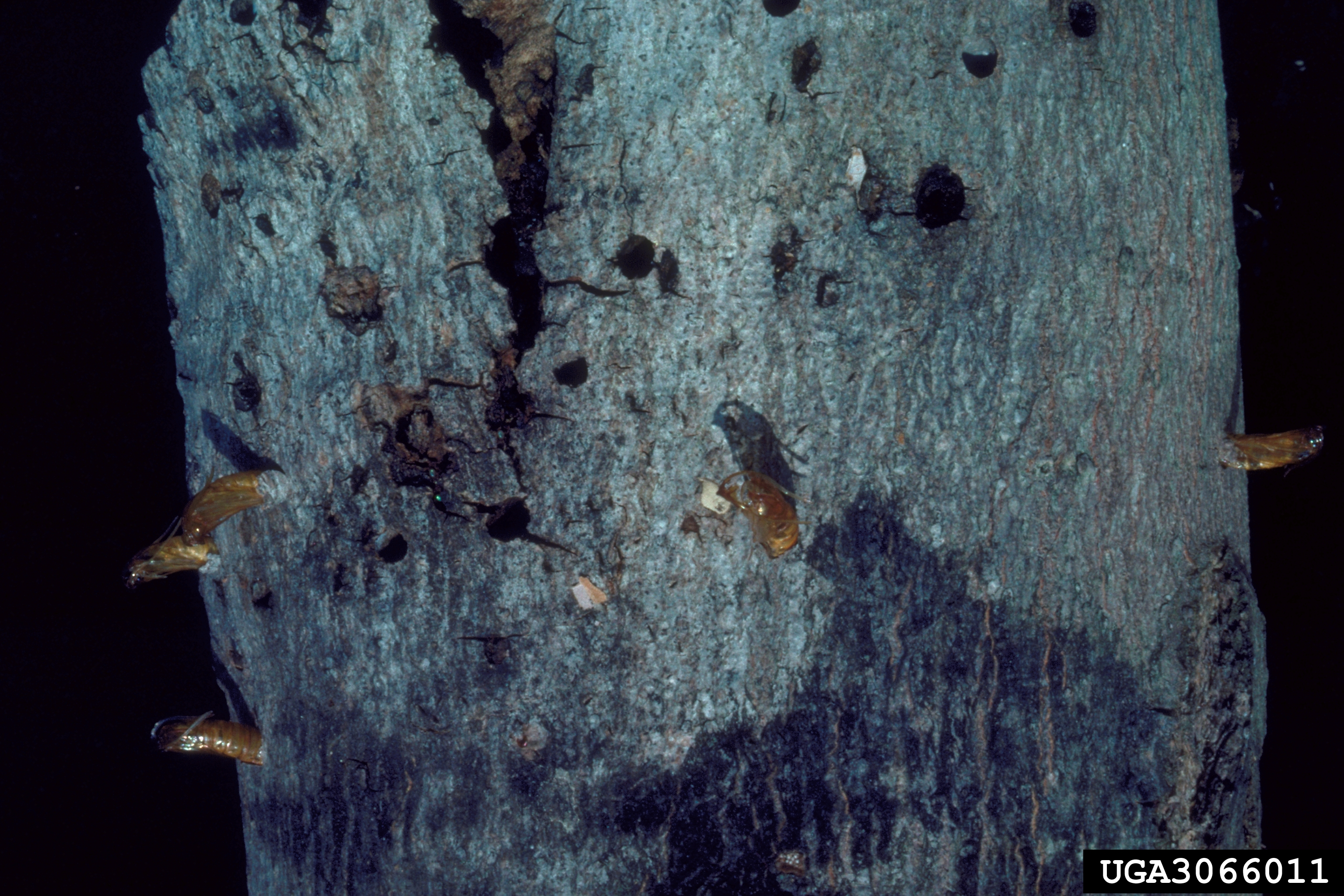
Pupal skins on the bark of a host tree

The wingspan is 18–25 mm. The moths are on the wing from June to July, but in the United States from April on.

The larvae feed on Acer species.
