= Synanthedon theryi =

Scientific classification
- Kingdom: Animalia
- Phylum: Arthropoda
- Clade: Pancrustacea
- Class: Insecta
- Order: Lepidoptera
- Family: Sesiidae
- Genus: Synanthedon
- Species: S. theryi

Binomial name
- Synanthedon theryi Le Cerf, 1916

Synonyms
- Aegeria pistarcha Meyrick, 1931

Species of moth

Synanthedon theryi is a moth of the family Sesiidae. It is found in Spain, Portugal, Morocco and Algeria.

The wingspan is 20–22 mm.

The larvae feed on Tamarix africana, Tamarix gallica and Tamarix boveana.
