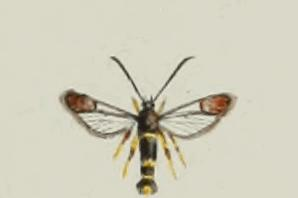

Scientific classification
- Kingdom: Animalia
- Phylum: Arthropoda
- Clade: Pancrustacea
- Class: Insecta
- Order: Lepidoptera
- Family: Sesiidae
- Genus: Synanthedon
- Species: S. codeti

Binomial name
- Synanthedon codeti (Oberthür, 1881)

Synonyms
- Sesia codeti Oberthür, 1881; Sesia puigi Oberthür, 1881; Synanthedon inversa Le Cerf, 1916; Synanthedon kabylaria Le Cerf, 1916; Synanthedon codeti var. maroccana Le Cerf, 1920; Synanthedon codeti var. almohades Le Cerf, 1920; Synanthedon ferdinandi Rungs, 1972; Synanthedon codeti ab. atavus Le Cerf, 1920

= Synanthedon codeti =

Species of moth

Synanthedon codeti is a moth of the family Sesiidae. It is found in France, Spain, Portugal and on Sardinia. It is also found in North Africa, from Morocco to Algeria and Tunisia.

The wingspan is 18–20 mm.

The larvae feed on Quercus, Castanea sativa, Juglans regia, Corylus avellana, Fagus sylvatica, Platanus orientalis, Malus, Prunus, Carya pecan and Carya olivaeformis.
