= Synanthedon nyanga =

Scientific classification
- Kingdom: Animalia
- Phylum: Arthropoda
- Clade: Pancrustacea
- Class: Insecta
- Order: Lepidoptera
- Family: Sesiidae
- Genus: Synanthedon
- Species: S. nyanga

Binomial name
- Synanthedon nyanga (Beutenmüller, 1899)

Synonyms
- Sesia nyanga Beutenmüller, 1899

Species of moth

Synanthedon nyanga is a moth of the family Sesiidae. It is known from Gabon.
