= Synanthedon iris =

Scientific classification
- Kingdom: Animalia
- Phylum: Arthropoda
- Clade: Pancrustacea
- Class: Insecta
- Order: Lepidoptera
- Family: Sesiidae
- Genus: Synanthedon
- Species: S. iris

Binomial name
- Synanthedon iris Le Cerf, 1916

Synonyms
- Conopia iris Le Cerf, 1916

Species of moth

Synanthedon iris is a moth of the family Sesiidae. It is known from Cameroon.
