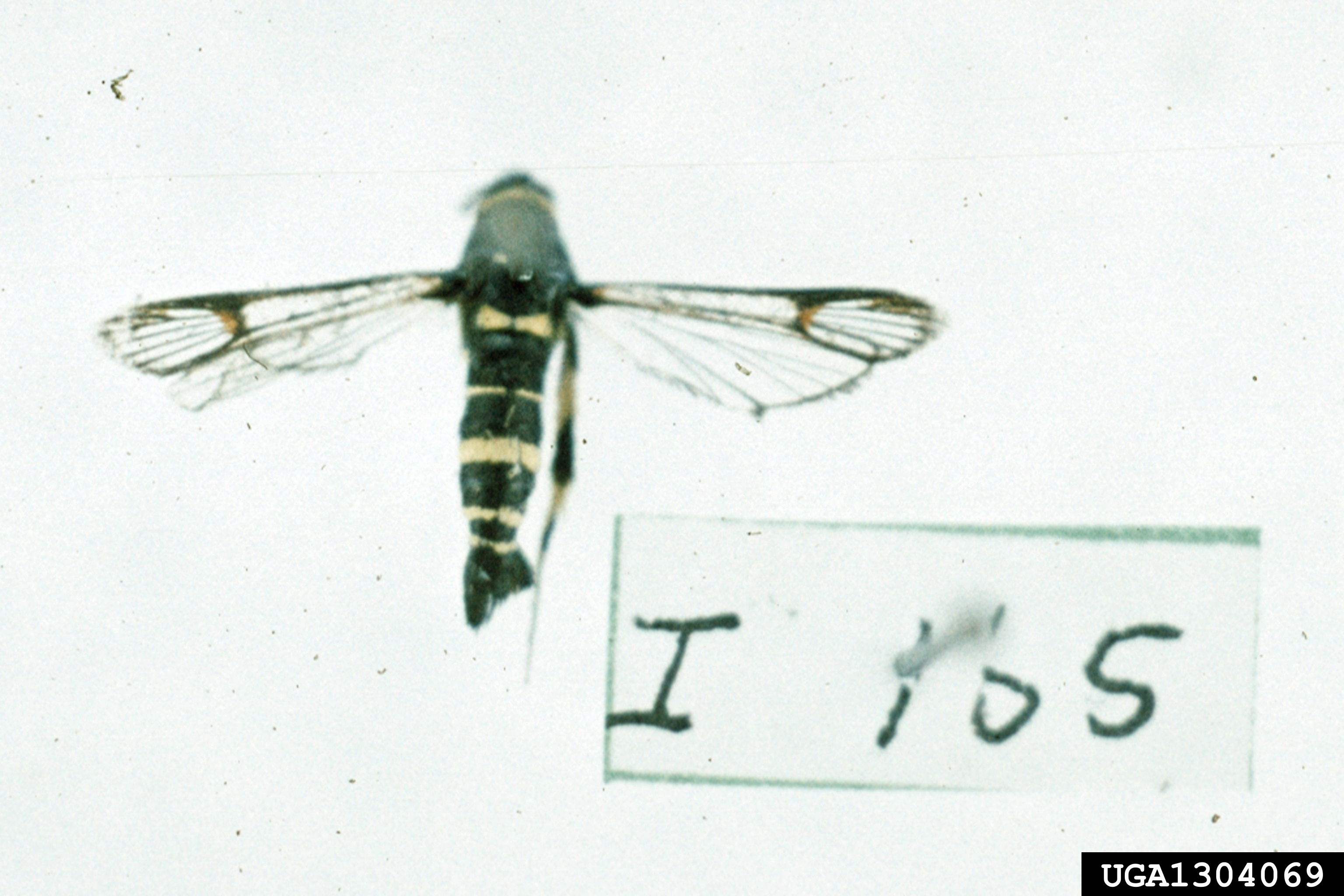

Scientific classification
- Kingdom: Animalia
- Phylum: Arthropoda
- Clade: Pancrustacea
- Class: Insecta
- Order: Lepidoptera
- Family: Sesiidae
- Genus: Synanthedon
- Species: S. decipiens

Binomial name
- Synanthedon decipiens H. Edwards, 1881

= Synanthedon decipiens =

Species of moth

Synanthedon decipiens, the oakgall clearwing or oak gall borer, is a moth of the family Sesiidae. It is found in eastern North America.

The wingspan is about 12 mm. The moths are on wing in June.

This species emerges from woody oak galls.
