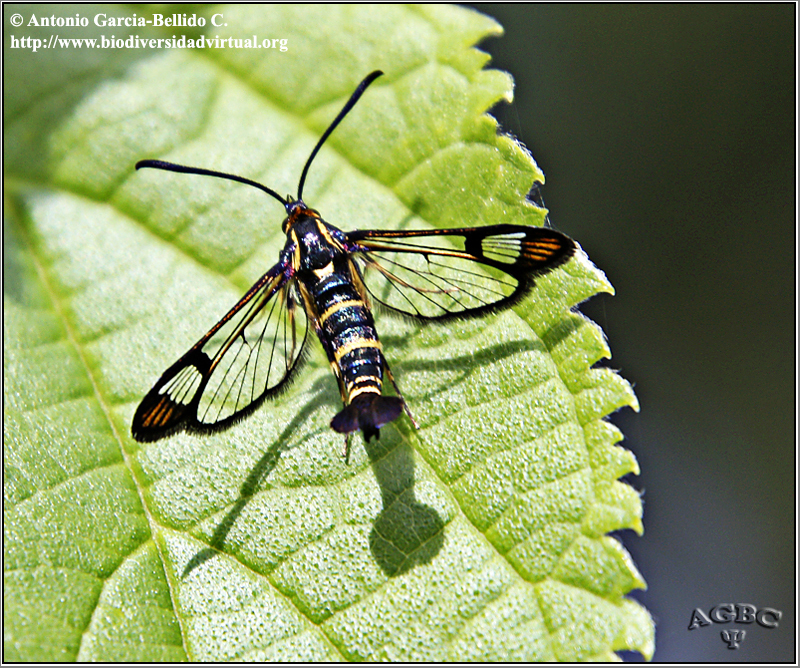
- Synanthedon conopiformis

Scientific classification
- Kingdom: Animalia
- Phylum: Arthropoda
- Clade: Pancrustacea
- Class: Insecta
- Order: Lepidoptera
- Family: Sesiidae
- Genus: Synanthedon
- Species: S. conopiformis

Binomial name
- Synanthedon conopiformis (Esper, 1782)

Synonyms
- Sphinx conopiformis Esper, 1782; Sphinx syrphiformis Hübner, 1796; Sesia nomadaeformis Laspeyres 1801 (nec Hübner, [1806]); Synanthedon conopiformis var. lucasi Dalla Torre & Strand, 1925; Synanthedon conopiformis ab. lucasi Le Cerf, 1922

= Synanthedon conopiformis =

Species of moth

Synanthedon conopiformis, Dale's oak clearwing, is a moth of the family Sesiidae. It is found in almost all of Europe, except the north.

The wingspan is 16–19 mm. Adults are on wing from June to August.

The larvae feed on Quercus robur, Quercus petraea and Quercus rubra. They bore into the stem of their host plant.
