= Synanthedon dybowskii =

Scientific classification
- Kingdom: Animalia
- Phylum: Arthropoda
- Clade: Pancrustacea
- Class: Insecta
- Order: Lepidoptera
- Family: Sesiidae
- Genus: Synanthedon
- Species: S. dybowskii

Binomial name
- Synanthedon dybowskii Le Cerf, 1917

Synonyms
- Albuna dybowskii Le Cerf, 1917

Species of moth

Synanthedon dybowskii is a moth of the family Sesiidae. It is found in Gabon.
