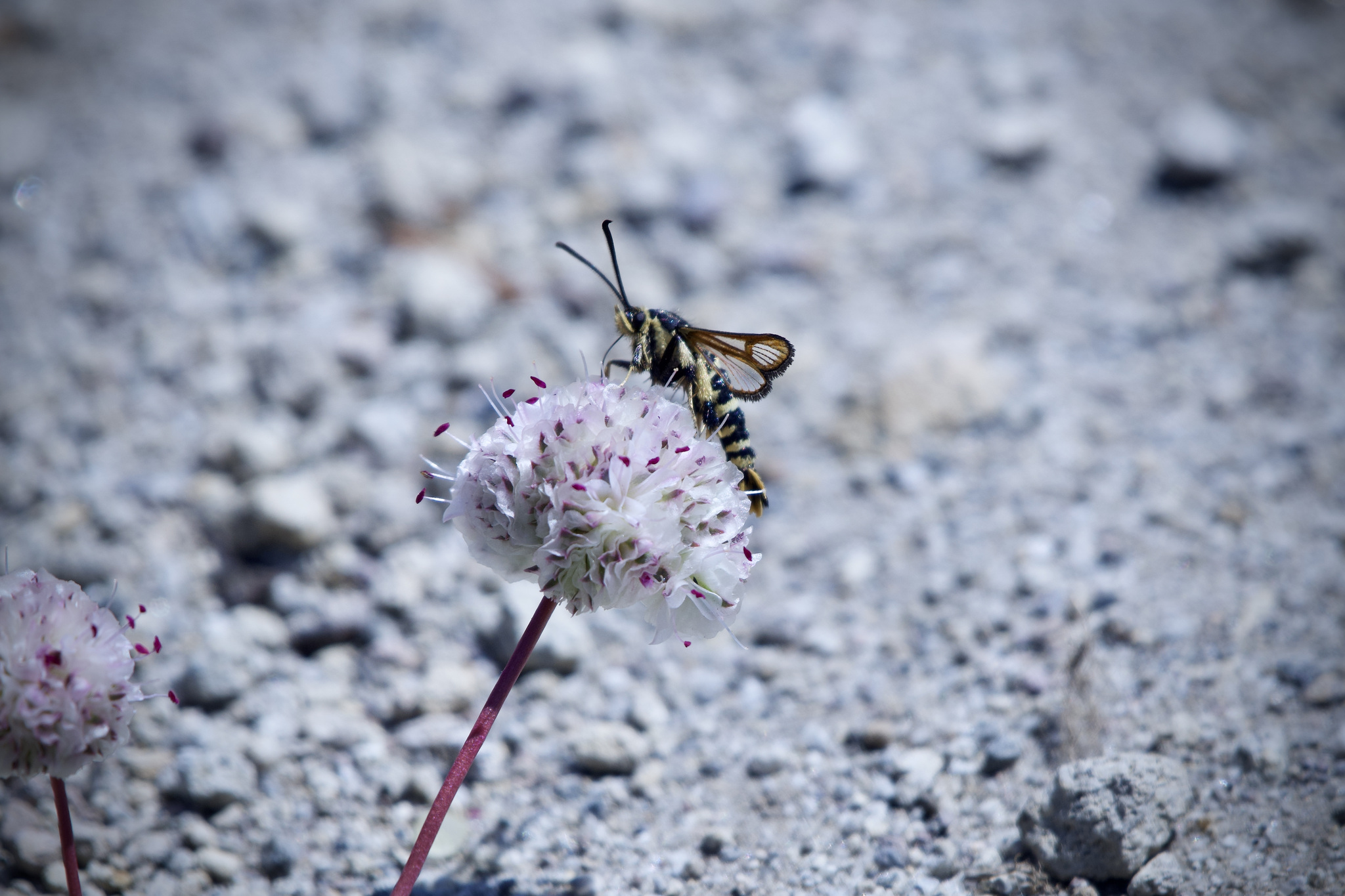
- Synanthedon chrysidipennis seen in Northern California.

Scientific classification
- Kingdom: Animalia
- Phylum: Arthropoda
- Clade: Pancrustacea
- Class: Insecta
- Order: Lepidoptera
- Family: Sesiidae
- Genus: Synanthedon
- Species: S. chrysidipennis

Binomial name
- Synanthedon chrysidipennis (Boisduval, 1869)

= Synanthedon chrysidipennis =

Species of moth

Synanthedon chrysidipennis is a moth of the family Sesiidae. It is found in western North America.
