= Synanthedon rhodia =

Scientific classification
- Kingdom: Animalia
- Phylum: Arthropoda
- Clade: Pancrustacea
- Class: Insecta
- Order: Lepidoptera
- Family: Sesiidae
- Genus: Synanthedon
- Species: S. rhodia

Binomial name
- Synanthedon rhodia (H. Druce, 1899)

Synonyms
- Aegeria rhodia H. Druce, 1899

Species of moth

Synanthedon rhodia is a moth of the family Sesiidae first described by Herbert Druce in 1899. It is known from South Africa.
