= Synanthedon colchidensis =

Scientific classification
- Kingdom: Animalia
- Phylum: Arthropoda
- Clade: Pancrustacea
- Class: Insecta
- Order: Lepidoptera
- Family: Sesiidae
- Genus: Synanthedon
- Species: S. colchidensis

Binomial name
- Synanthedon colchidensis Špatenka & Gorbunov, 1992

Species of moth

Synanthedon colchidensis is a moth of the family Sesiidae. It is restricted to the Caucasus Mountains.

The larvae feed on Abies nordmanniana. They live in swellings caused by a fungus. In springtime, the larva constructs a very characteristic exit tube from the root to ground level.
