= Synanthedon mesiaeformis =

Scientific classification
- Kingdom: Animalia
- Phylum: Arthropoda
- Clade: Pancrustacea
- Class: Insecta
- Order: Lepidoptera
- Family: Sesiidae
- Genus: Synanthedon
- Species: S. mesiaeformis

Binomial name
- Synanthedon mesiaeformis (Herrich-Schaffer, 1846)

Synonyms
- Sesia mesiaeformis Herrich-Schaffer, 1846; Sesia mesiiformis Staudinger, 1856; Setia masariformis Meigen, 1830 (nec Ochsenheimer, 1808)

Species of moth

Synanthedon mesiaeformis is a moth of the family Sesiidae. It is found in France, Spain, Lithuania, Poland, the Czech Republic, most of the Balkan Peninsula, Finland, Russia and Asia Minor. The species prefers solitary trees on meadows, in parks and along streams.

The wingspan is 19–31 mm. Adults are on wing from the second half of May to the end of July.

The larvae feed on Alnus glutinosa.
