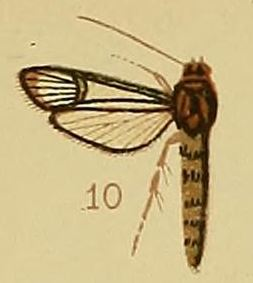

Scientific classification
- Kingdom: Animalia
- Phylum: Arthropoda
- Clade: Pancrustacea
- Class: Insecta
- Order: Lepidoptera
- Family: Sesiidae
- Genus: Synanthedon
- Species: S. cyanescens

Binomial name
- Synanthedon cyanescens (Hampson, 1910)

Synonyms
- Ichneumenoptera cyanescens Hampson, 1910

= Synanthedon cyanescens =

Species of moth

Synanthedon cyanescens is a moth of the family Sesiidae. It is known from the Democratic Republic of the Congo and Zambia.
