= Synanthedon erythromma =

Scientific classification
- Kingdom: Animalia
- Phylum: Arthropoda
- Clade: Pancrustacea
- Class: Insecta
- Order: Lepidoptera
- Family: Sesiidae
- Genus: Synanthedon
- Species: S. erythromma

Binomial name
- Synanthedon erythromma Hampson, 1919

Synonyms
- Aegeria pyrostoma Meyrick, 1927

Species of moth

Synanthedon erythromma is a moth of the family Sesiidae. It is known from Kenya.
