= Synanthedon stenothyris =

Scientific classification
- Kingdom: Animalia
- Phylum: Arthropoda
- Clade: Pancrustacea
- Class: Insecta
- Order: Lepidoptera
- Family: Sesiidae
- Genus: Synanthedon
- Species: S. stenothyris

Binomial name
- Synanthedon stenothyris (Meyrick, 1933)

Synonyms
- Aegeria stenothyris Meyrick, 1933

Species of moth

Synanthedon stenothyris is a moth of the family Sesiidae. It is known from South Africa.
