= Synanthedon serica =

Scientific classification
- Kingdom: Animalia
- Phylum: Arthropoda
- Clade: Pancrustacea
- Class: Insecta
- Order: Lepidoptera
- Family: Sesiidae
- Genus: Synanthedon
- Species: S. serica

Binomial name
- Synanthedon serica (Alpheraky, 1882)

Synonyms
- Sesia serica Alpheraky, 1882

Species of moth

Synanthedon serica is a moth of the family Sesiidae. It is found in Russia, Kazakhstan, Central Asia and north-western China.

The wingspan is about 20 mm.
