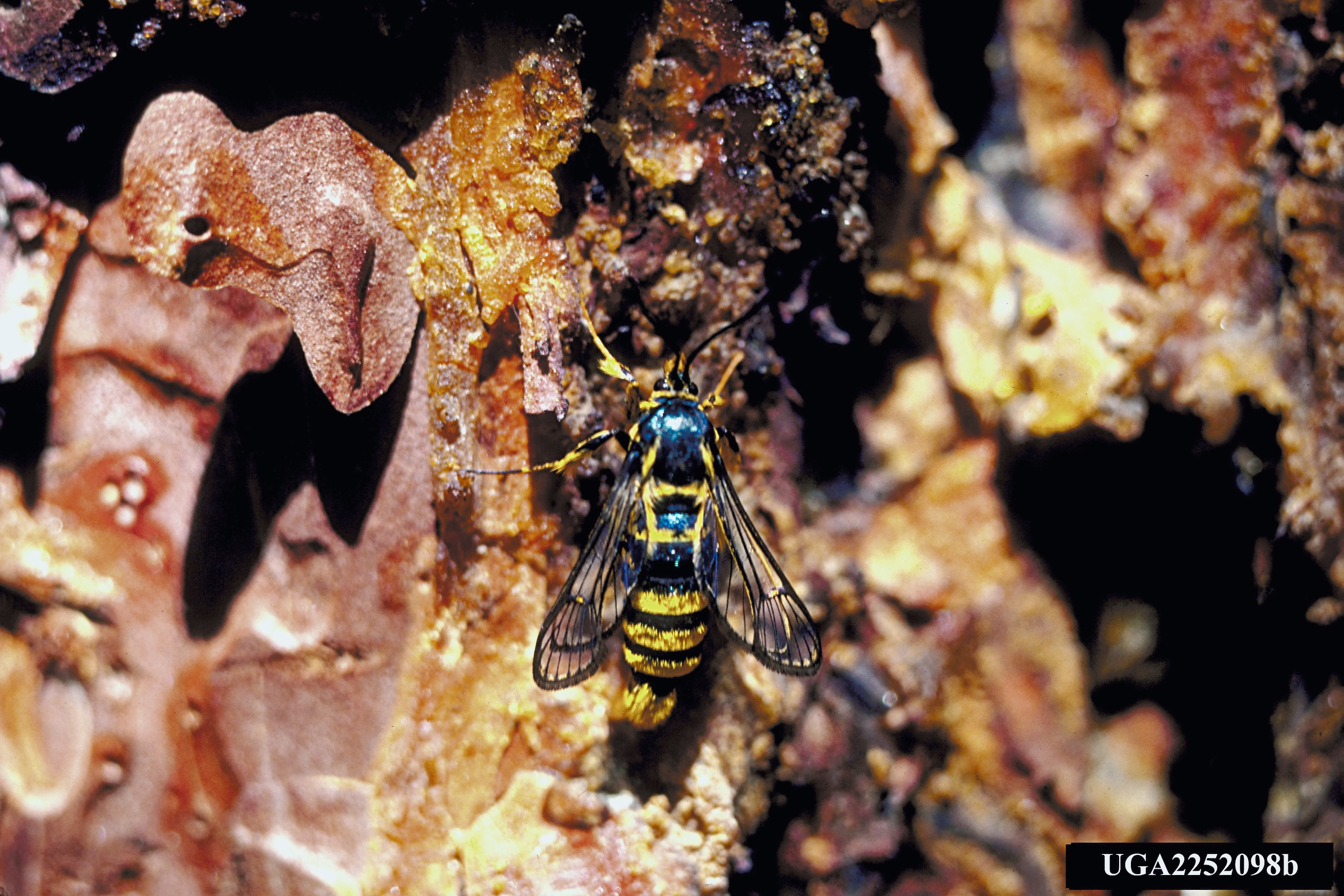

Scientific classification
- Kingdom: Animalia
- Phylum: Arthropoda
- Clade: Pancrustacea
- Class: Insecta
- Order: Lepidoptera
- Family: Sesiidae
- Genus: Synanthedon
- Species: S. sequoiae

Binomial name
- Synanthedon sequoiae (Edwards, 1881)

Synonyms
- Bembecia sequoiae Edwards, 1881; Bembecia superba (Edwards, 1881); Aegeria pinorum (Behrens, 1889)

= Synanthedon sequoiae =

Species of moth

Synanthedon sequoiae, the sequoia pitch moth, is a moth of the family Sesiidae. It is found from California north to British Columbia.

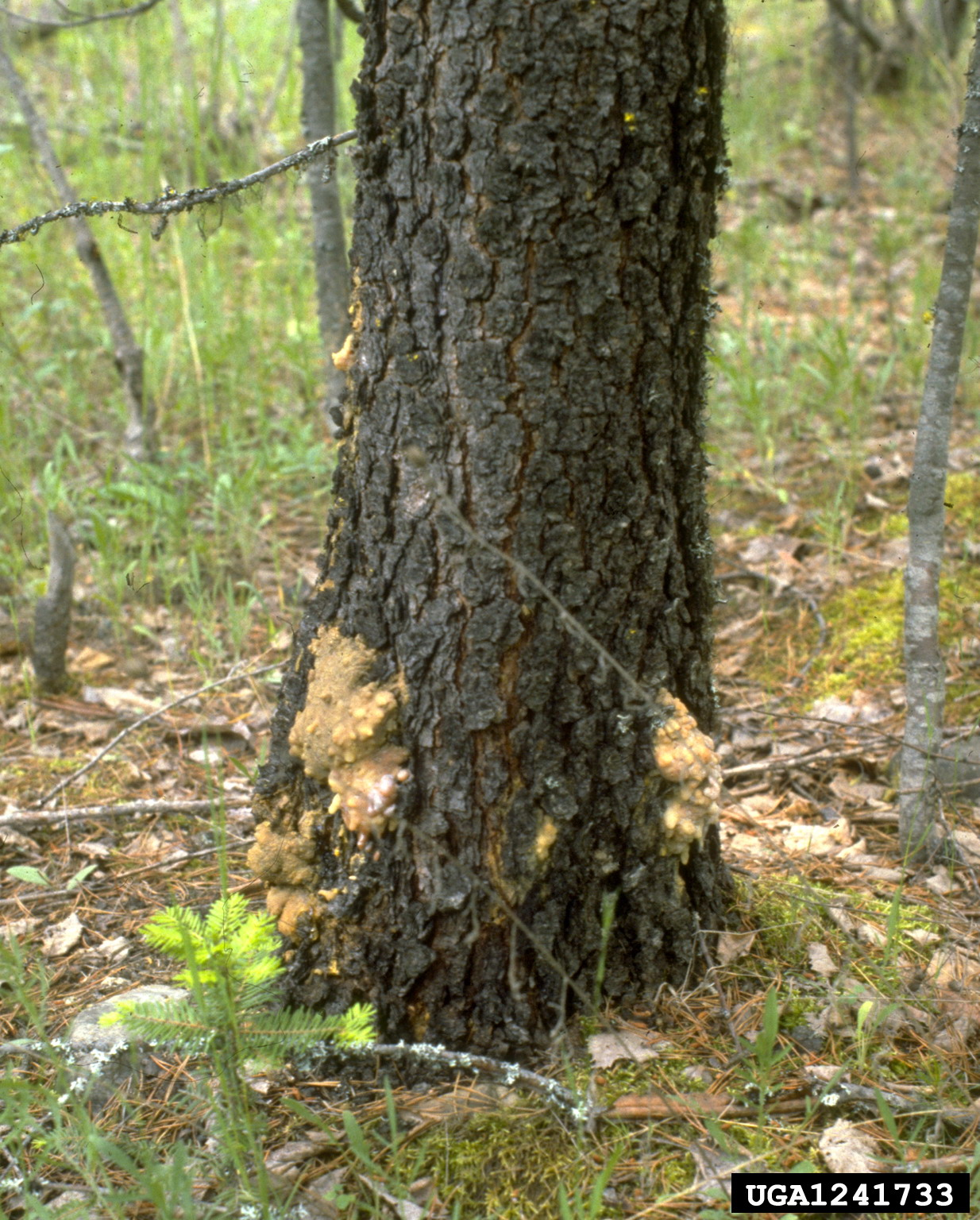
Damage

The wingspan is 20–27 mm (0.79–1.06 in). Adults are on wing from May to early September.
