= Synanthedon pini =

Scientific classification
- Kingdom: Animalia
- Phylum: Arthropoda
- Clade: Pancrustacea
- Class: Insecta
- Order: Lepidoptera
- Family: Sesiidae
- Genus: Synanthedon
- Species: S. pini

Binomial name
- Synanthedon pini (Kellicott, 1881)

Synonyms
- Aegeria pini Kellicott, 1881

Species of moth

Synanthedon pini, the pitch mass borer, is a moth of the family Sesiidae. The pitch mass borer occurs on spruce and pine in eastern North America. It does not kill trees, but the pitch-filled larval tunnels in the wood cause defects in the lumber.

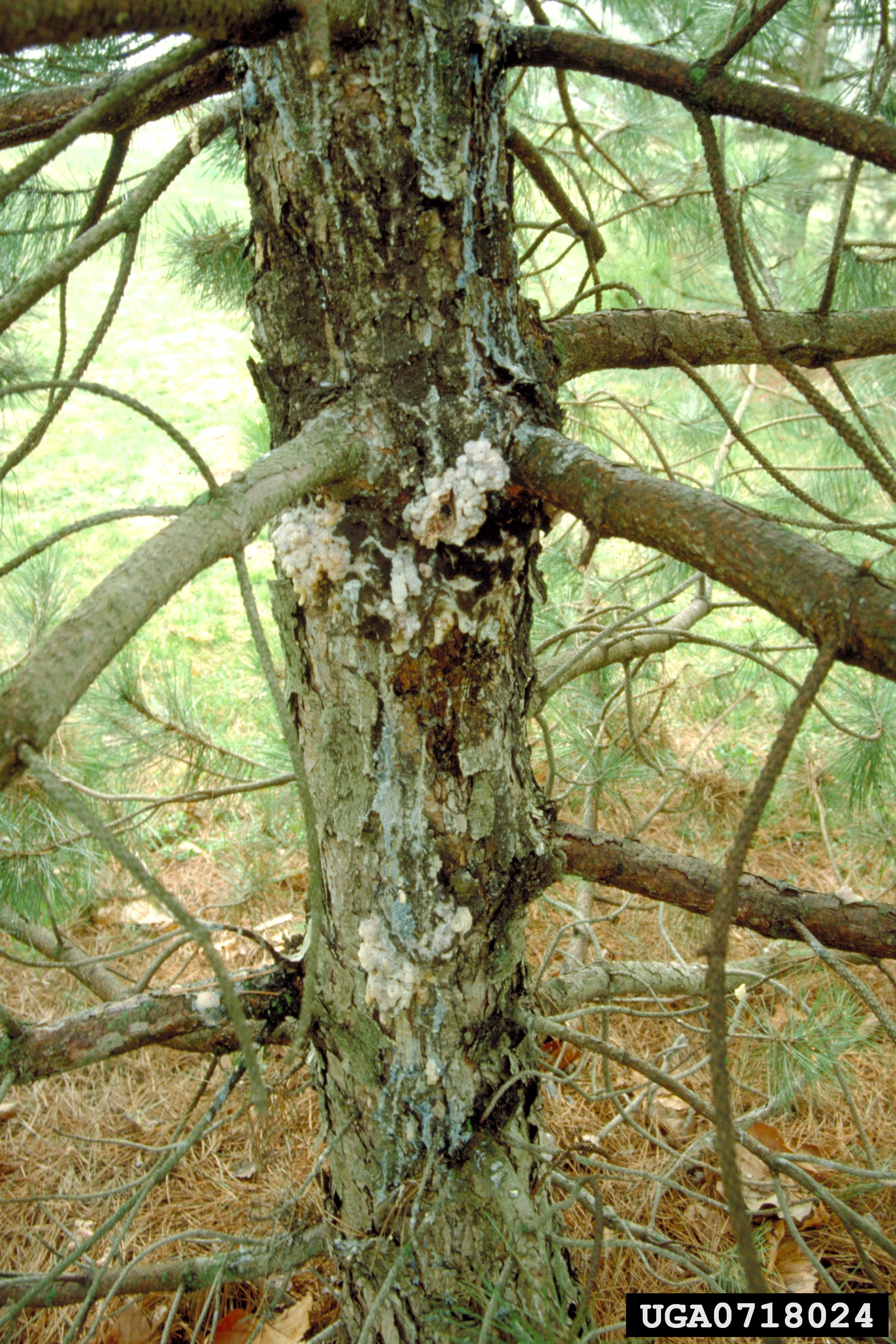
Damage

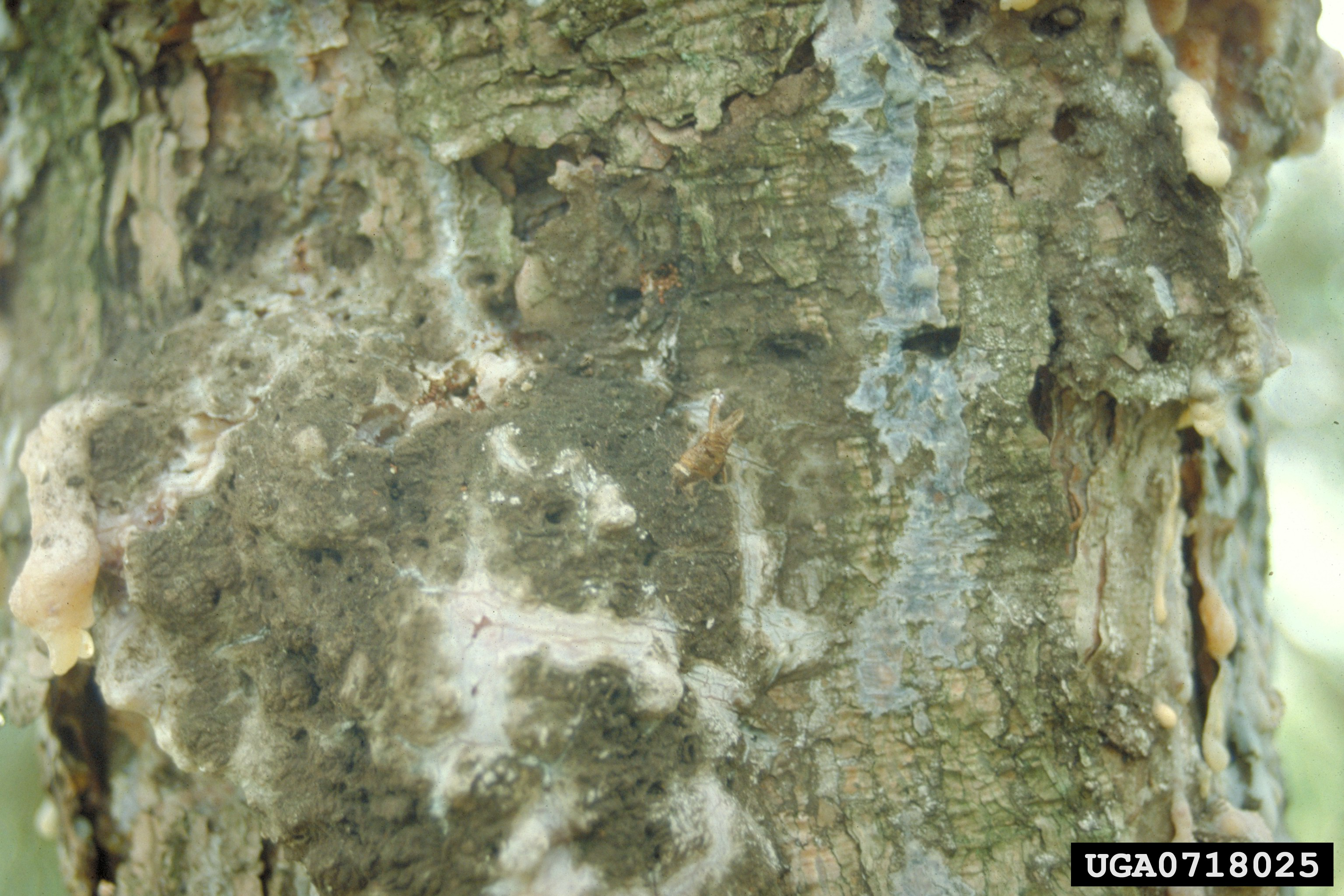
Damage

== Description ==
Adults are on wing in mid July. The adults are unusual in that the wings are mostly clear, unlike those of most moths. The eggs are laid on the bark in early summer, usually near a wound or in scars or crevices. The larvae feed in tunnels on the inner bark and sapwood, causing a copious flow of pitch, which hardens on the bark. They feed for 2 or 3 years and attain a length of about 25 mm before pupating in the pitch mass. The larvae feed on pine and spruce species, including Austrian, eastern white, Scots and Jack pines as well as white, Norway and Colorado blue spruce.

Adults emerge in early summer.
