= Synanthedon auripes =

Scientific classification
- Kingdom: Animalia
- Phylum: Arthropoda
- Clade: Pancrustacea
- Class: Insecta
- Order: Lepidoptera
- Family: Sesiidae
- Genus: Synanthedon
- Species: S. auripes

Binomial name
- Synanthedon auripes (Hampson, 1910)

Synonyms
- Lepidopoda auripes Hampson, 1910; Synanthedon hampsoni Heppner & Duckworth, 1981

Species of moth

Synanthedon auripes is a moth of the family Sesiidae. It is known from Ghana.
