= Chamaesphecia albiventris =

Scientific classification
- Kingdom: Animalia
- Phylum: Arthropoda
- Clade: Pancrustacea
- Class: Insecta
- Order: Lepidoptera
- Family: Sesiidae
- Genus: Chamaesphecia
- Subgenus: Scopulosphecia
- Species: C. albiventris

Binomial name
- Chamaesphecia albiventris (Lederer, 1853)

Synonyms
- Sesia albiventris Lederer, 1853 (nec Beutenmüller, 1899)

Species of moth

Chamaesphecia albiventris is a moth of the family Sesiidae. It is found in Bulgaria, Greece and Asia Minor.

The larvae feed on Melissa officinalis.
