= List of moths of Gabon =

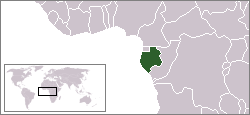
Location of Gabon

There are about 830 known moth species of Gabon. The moths (mostly nocturnal) and butterflies (mostly diurnal) together make up the taxonomic order Lepidoptera.

This is a list of moth species which have been recorded in Gabon.

== Alucitidae ==
- Alucita coffeina (Viette, 1958)

== Anomoeotidae ==
- Anomoeotes leucolena Holland, 1893
- Anomoeotes tenellula Holland, 1893

== Arctiidae ==
- Acantharctia mundata (Walker, 1865)
- Afraloa bifurca (Walker, 1855)
- Afrasura clara (Holland, 1893)
- Afrasura numida (Holland, 1893)
- Afrasura obliterata (Walker, 1864)
- Afroarctia bergeri Toulgoët, 1978
- Amata creobota (Holland, 1893)
- Amata goodii (Holland, 1893)
- Amata interniplaga (Mabille, 1890)
- Amata leimacis (Holland, 1893)
- Amata leucerythra (Holland, 1893)
- Amata marina (Butler, 1876)
- Amerila brunnea (Hampson, 1901)
- Amerila luteibarba (Hampson, 1901)
- Amerila roseomarginata (Rothschild, 1910)
- Anapisa crenophylax (Holland, 1893)
- Anapisa melaleuca (Holland, 1898)
- Anapisa monotica (Holland, 1893)
- Apisa canescens Walker, 1855
- Apisa cinereocostata Holland, 1893
- Archilema subumbrata (Holland, 1893)
- Archithosia costimacula (Mabille, 1878)
- Asura erythrias (Holland, 1893)
- Asura gubunica (Holland, 1893)
- Asura temperata (Holland, 1893)
- Balacra flavimacula Walker, 1856
- Balacra haemalea Holland, 1893
- Balacra pulchra Aurivillius, 1892
- Balacra rubricincta Holland, 1893
- Balacra rubrostriata (Aurivillius, 1892)
- Caryatis phileta (Drury, 1782)
- Ceryx albimacula (Walker, 1854)
- Ceryx cybelistes (Holland, 1893)
- Ceryx elasson (Holland, 1893)
- Chrysaegliodes noliformis Strand, 1912
- Creatonotos leucanioides Holland, 1893
- Cyana africana (Holland, 1893)
- Cyana rubristriga (Holland, 1893)
- Eilema monochroma (Holland, 1893)
- Euchromia guineensis (Fabricius, 1775)
- Eugoa costiplaga Holland, 1893
- Eugoa tropicalis Holland, 1893
- Kiriakoffalia lemairei (Toulgoët, 1976)
- Logunovium nigricosta (Holland, 1893)
- Logunovium scortillum Wallengren, 1875
- Lymantriopsis lacteata (Holland, 1893)
- Mecistorhabdia haematoessa (Holland, 1893)
- Meganaclia perpusilla (Walker, 1856)
- Melisa diptera (Walker, 1854)
- Metarctia haematica Holland, 1893
- Metarctia paremphares Holland, 1893
- Metarctia rubripuncta Hampson, 1898
- Metarctia rufescens Walker, 1855
- Muxta xanthopa (Holland, 1893)
- Myopsyche cytogaster (Holland, 1893)
- Myopsyche elachista (Holland, 1893)
- Myopsyche miserabilis (Holland, 1893)
- Myopsyche nervalis Strand, 1912
- Myopsyche puncticincta (Holland, 1893)
- Neophemula vitrina (Oberthür, 1909)
- Neuroxena fulleri (Druce, 1883)
- Nyctemera apicalis (Walker, 1854)
- Nyctemera druna (Swinhoe, 1904)
- Nyctemera hemixantha (Aurivillius, 1904)
- Nyctemera perspicua (Walker, 1854)
- Nyctemera xanthura (Plötz, 1880)
- Paramelisa lophura Aurivillius, 1905
- Paremonia luteicincta (Holland, 1893)
- Pseudothyretes carnea (Hampson, 1898)
- Pseudothyretes perpusilla (Walker, 1856)
- Rhipidarctia invaria (Walker, 1856)
- Rhipidarctia lutea (Holland, 1893)
- Rhipidarctia pareclecta (Holland, 1893)
- Spilosoma aurantiaca (Holland, 1893)
- Spilosoma rava (Druce, 1898)
- Stenarctia quadripunctata Aurivillius, 1900
- Thumatha fuscescens Walker, 1866

== Drepanidae ==
- Epicampoptera erosa (Holland, 1893)
- Epicampoptera strandi Bryk, 1913
- Epicampoptera tumidula Watson, 1965
- Isospidia brunneola (Holland, 1893)
- Negera bimaculata (Holland, 1893)
- Negera disspinosa Watson, 1965
- Negera natalensis (Felder, 1874)
- Spidia miserrima (Holland, 1893)
- Uranometra oculata (Holland, 1893)

== Eupterotidae ==
- Camerunia orphne (Schaus, 1893)
- Epijana cinerea Holland, 1893
- Epijana cosima (Plötz, 1880)
- Hoplojana rhodoptera (Gerstaecker, 1871)
- Jana strigina Westwood, 1849
- Parajana gabunica (Aurivillius, 1892)
- Phiala subiridescens (Holland, 1893)
- Stenoglene citrinus (Druce, 1886)
- Vianga dimidiata (Aurivillius, 1893)

== Geometridae ==
- Acrostatheusis reducta Herbulot, 1967
- Cleora rostella D. S. Fletcher, 1967
- Ctenoberta abanga Prout, 1915
- Cyclophora dewitzi (Prout, 1920)
- Cyclophora diplosticta (Prout, 1918)
- Dioptrochasma homochroa (Holland, 1893)
- Gelasmodes fasciata (Warren, 1899)
- Geodena absimilis Holland, 1893
- Geodena notata (Holland, 1893)
- Gongropteryx fasciata (Holland, 1893)
- Megadrepana cinerea Holland, 1893
- Melinoessa asteria Prout, 1934
- Mesomima tenuifascia (Holland, 1893)
- Miantochora picturata Herbulot, 1985
- Mimaletis humilis Warren, 1894
- Narthecusa tenuiorata Walker, 1862
- Pitthea continua Walker, 1854
- Plegapteryx anomalus Herrich-Schäffer, 1856
- Scopula megalostigma (Prout, 1915)
- Scopula plionocentra Prout, 1920
- Somatina syneorus Prout, 1915
- Sphingomima olivacea (Viette, 1954)
- Terina charmione (Fabricius, 1793)
- Terina maculifera Strand, 1911
- Terina octogesa (Druce, 1887)
- Terina reliqua Prout, 1925
- Vaena eacleoides Walker, 1869
- Zamarada aclys D. S. Fletcher, 1974
- Zamarada acrochra Prout, 1928
- Zamarada adumbrata D. S. Fletcher, 1974
- Zamarada aerata D. S. Fletcher, 1974
- Zamarada aglae Oberthür, 1912
- Zamarada antimima D. S. Fletcher, 1974
- Zamarada astales D. S. Fletcher, 1974
- Zamarada astyphela D. S. Fletcher, 1974
- Zamarada auratisquama Warren, 1897
- Zamarada aurolineata Gaede, 1915
- Zamarada bastelbergeri Gaede, 1915
- Zamarada bernardii D. S. Fletcher, 1974
- Zamarada bicuspida D. S. Fletcher, 1974
- Zamarada bilobata D. S. Fletcher, 1974
- Zamarada cathetus D. S. Fletcher, 1974
- Zamarada catori Bethune-Baker, 1913
- Zamarada cautela D. S. Fletcher, 1974
- Zamarada cepa D. S. Fletcher, 1974
- Zamarada cinereata D. S. Fletcher, 1974
- Zamarada clavigera D. S. Fletcher, 1974
- Zamarada clenchi D. S. Fletcher, 1974
- Zamarada clio Oberthür, 1912
- Zamarada corroborata Herbulot, 1954
- Zamarada corymbophora D. S. Fletcher, 1974
- Zamarada cydippe Herbulot, 1954
- Zamarada dargei D. S. Fletcher, 1974
- Zamarada dentigera Warren, 1909
- Zamarada dialitha D. S. Fletcher, 1974
- Zamarada dilata D. S. Fletcher, 1974
- Zamarada dione D. S. Fletcher, 1974
- Zamarada disparata D. S. Fletcher, 1974
- Zamarada dolorosa D. S. Fletcher, 1974
- Zamarada dyscapna D. S. Fletcher, 1974
- Zamarada effa Pierre-Baltus, 2000
- Zamarada emaciata D. S. Fletcher, 1974
- Zamarada episema D. S. Fletcher, 1974
- Zamarada eryma D. S. Fletcher, 1974
- Zamarada euerces Prout, 1928
- Zamarada ferruginata D. S. Fletcher, 1974
- Zamarada flavicosta Warren, 1897
- Zamarada fumosa Gaede, 1915
- Zamarada gaedei D. S. Fletcher, 1974
- Zamarada griseola D. S. Fletcher, 1974
- Zamarada herbuloti D. S. Fletcher, 1974
- Zamarada hero D. S. Fletcher, 1974
- Zamarada ixiaria Swinhoe, 1904
- Zamarada kala Herbulot, 1975
- Zamarada kompsotes D. S. Fletcher, 1974
- Zamarada labifera Prout, 1915
- Zamarada laciniata D. S. Fletcher, 1974
- Zamarada lanceolata D. S. Fletcher, 1974
- Zamarada latimargo Warren, 1897
- Zamarada loangensis Sircoulomb, 2008
- Zamarada lope Pierre-Baltus, 2000
- Zamarada lophobela D. S. Fletcher, 1974
- Zamarada lorana Pierre-Baltus, 2006
- Zamarada mackanga Pierre-Baltus, 2000
- Zamarada manifesta D. S. Fletcher, 1974
- Zamarada melanopyga Herbulot, 1954
- Zamarada melpomene Oberthür, 1912
- Zamarada merga D. S. Fletcher, 1974
- Zamarada mimesis D. S. Fletcher, 1974
- Zamarada miranda D. S. Fletcher, 1974
- Zamarada odontis Pierre-Baltus, 2000
- Zamarada ostracodes D. S. Fletcher, 1974
- Zamarada paxilla D. S. Fletcher, 1974
- Zamarada pelobasis D. S. Fletcher, 1974
- Zamarada penthesis D. S. Fletcher, 1974
- Zamarada phrontisaria Swinhoe, 1904
- Zamarada protrusa Warren, 1897
- Zamarada quadriplaga Pierre-Baltus, 2005
- Zamarada radula D. S. Fletcher, 1974
- Zamarada rupta D. S. Fletcher, 1974
- Zamarada sagitta D. S. Fletcher, 1974
- Zamarada schalida D. S. Fletcher, 1974
- Zamarada sicula D. S. Fletcher, 1974
- Zamarada subincolaris Gaede, 1915
- Zamarada suda D. S. Fletcher, 1974
- Zamarada thalia Oberthür, 1912
- Zamarada tortura D. S. Fletcher, 1974
- Zamarada triangularis Gaede, 1915
- Zamarada tullia Oberthür, 1913
- Zamarada umbra Pierre-Baltus, 2006
- Zamarada undimarginata Warren, 1897
- Zamarada urania Oberthür, 1912
- Zamarada variola D. S. Fletcher, 1974
- Zamarada volsella D. S. Fletcher, 1974
- Zamarada vulpina Warren, 1897
- Zamarada xystra D. S. Fletcher, 1974

== Lasiocampidae ==
- Cheligium choerocampoides (Holland, 1893)
- Cheligium licrisonia Zolotuhin & Gurkovich, 2009
- Cheligium lineatum (Aurivillius, 1893)
- Cheligium pinheyi Zolotuhin & Gurkovich, 2009
- Chrysopsyche viridescens (Holland, 1893)
- Filiola occidentale (Strand, 1912)
- Gastropacha africana (Holland, 1893)
- Gastroplakaeis forficulatus (Möschler, 1887)
- Gastroplakaeis greyi Holland, 1893
- Gelo jordani (Tams, 1936)
- Gonobombyx angulata Aurivillius, 1893
- Gonometa bicolor Dewitz, 1881
- Gonometa titan Holland, 1893
- Gonopacha brotoessa (Holland, 1893)
- Hypotrabala castanea Holland, 1893
- Leipoxais major Holland, 1893
- Leipoxais makomona Strand, 1912
- Leipoxais marginepunctata Holland, 1893
- Leipoxais obscura Aurivillius, 1908
- Leipoxais peraffinis Holland, 1893
- Leipoxais rufobrunnea Strand, 1912
- Mallocampa audea (Druce, 1887)
- Mallocampa leucophaea (Holland, 1893)
- Mallocampa porphyria (Holland, 1893)
- Mimopacha cinerascens (Holland, 1893)
- Morongea avoniffi (Tams, 1929)
- Morongea cruenta Zolotuhin & Prozorov, 2010
- Morongea flavipicta (Tams, 1929)
- Morongea gemmo Zolotuhin & Prozorov, 2010
- Muzunguja rectilineata (Aurivillius, 1900)
- Nepehria olivia Gurkovich & Zolotuhin, 2010
- Opisthodontia diva Zolotuhin & Prozorov, 2010
- Opisthodontia supramalis Zolotuhin & Prozorov, 2010
- Opisthoheza heza Zolotuhin & Prozorov, 2010
- Pachymeta immunda (Holland, 1893)
- Pachymetana niveoplaga (Aurivillius, 1900)
- Pachypasa directa (Mabille, 1893)
- Pachytrina crestalina Zolotuhin & Gurkovich, 2009
- Pachytrina gliharta Zolotuhin & Gurkovich, 2009
- Pachytrina honrathii (Dewitz, 1881)
- Pachytrina okzilina Zolotuhin & Gurkovich, 2009
- Pachytrina papyroides (Tams, 1936)
- Pachytrina wenigina Zolotuhin & Gurkovich, 2009
- Pallastica mesoleuca (Strand, 1911)
- Philotherma spargata (Holland, 1893)
- Pseudometa minima (Holland, 1893)
- Sonitha alucard Zolotuhin & Prozorov, 2010
- Sonitha bernardii Zolotuhin & Prozorov, 2010
- Sonitha chocolatina Zolotuhin & Prozorov, 2010
- Sonitha gelata Zolotuhin & Prozorov, 2010
- Sonitha libera (Aurivillius, 1914)
- Sonitha picassoi Zolotuhin & Prozorov, 2010
- Stenophatna dentata (Aurivillius, 1899)
- Stenophatna foedifraga Zolotuhin & Prozorov, 2010
- Stenophatna hollandi (Tams, 1929)
- Stoermeriana directa (Mabille, 1893)
- Stoermeriana fuliginosa (Holland, 1893)
- Stoermeriana livida (Holland, 1893)
- Streblote tessmanni (Strand, 1912)
- Theophasida obusta (Tams, 1929)
- Theophasida valkyria Zolotuhin & Prozorov, 2010

== Limacodidae ==
- Chrysectropa roseofasciata (Aurivillius, 1900)
- Chrysopoloma theorini Aurivillius, 1891
- Latoia urda (Druce, 1887)
- Parasa princeps Aurivillius, 1900

== Lymantriidae ==
- Abynotha hylomima (Holland, 1893)
- Aroa nigripicta Holland, 1893
- Batella muscosa (Holland, 1893)
- Crorema setinoides (Holland, 1893)
- Dasychira agrotoides (Holland, 1893)
- Dasychira albibasalis (Holland, 1893)
- Dasychira albicostata (Holland, 1893)
- Dasychira albilinea (Holland, 1893)
- Dasychira albinotata (Holland, 1893)
- Dasychira albosignata Holland, 1893
- Dasychira albospargata (Holland, 1893)
- Dasychira apicata (Holland, 1893)
- Dasychira arctioides (Holland, 1893)
- Dasychira argiloides (Holland, 1893)
- Dasychira brunneicosta (Holland, 1893)
- Dasychira caeca (Plötz, 1880)
- Dasychira chloromorpha (Holland, 1893)
- Dasychira circumdata (Holland, 1893)
- Dasychira clathrata (Holland, 1893)
- Dasychira coeruleifascia (Holland, 1893)
- Dasychira costiplaga (Holland, 1893)
- Dasychira crucifera (Holland, 1893)
- Dasychira delicata (Holland, 1893)
- Dasychira diluta (Holland, 1893)
- Dasychira erubescens (Holland, 1893)
- Dasychira flava (Holland, 1893)
- Dasychira fumosa (Holland, 1893)
- Dasychira fuscula Hering, 1926
- Dasychira gabunica Holland, ????
- Dasychira gonophora (Holland, 1893)
- Dasychira goodii (Holland, 1893)
- Dasychira hyloica (Holland, 1893)
- Dasychira hypnota (Collenette, 1960)
- Dasychira miserata (Holland, 1893)
- Dasychira nigristriata (Holland, 1893)
- Dasychira notia Hering, 1926
- Dasychira nubifera Holland, 1893
- Dasychira nubilata (Holland, 1893)
- Dasychira obscura (Holland, 1893)
- Dasychira ocellata (Holland, 1893)
- Dasychira ocellifera (Holland, 1893)
- Dasychira proletaria (Holland, 1893)
- Dasychira prospera Hering, 1926
- Dasychira ruptilinea Holland, 1893
- Dasychira striata (Holland, 1893)
- Dasychira strigidentata Bethune-Baker, 1911
- Dasychira thersites (Holland, 1893)
- Dasychira viridipallens (Hering, 1926)
- Dasychira viridis (Holland, 1893)
- Eudasychira georgiana (Fawcett, 1900)
- Eudasychira sublutescens (Holland, 1893)
- Euproctidion gabunica Holland, 1893
- Euproctidion pallida (Holland, 1893)
- Euproctilla tesselata (Holland, 1893)
- Euproctillina mesomelaena (Holland, 1893)
- Euproctis albinula Hering, 1926
- Euproctis apicipuncta (Holland, 1893)
- Euproctis bigutta Holland, 1893
- Euproctis discipuncta (Holland, 1893)
- Euproctis melaleuca (Holland, 1893)
- Euproctis nigra (Holland, 1893)
- Euproctis palla (Holland, 1893)
- Euproctis parallela (Holland, 1893)
- Euproctis proxantha (Holland, 1893)
- Euproctis rotunda (Holland, 1893)
- Euproctis rubroguttata Aurivillius, 1904
- Euproctis tessellata (Holland, 1893)
- Euproctis xanthomelaena (Holland, 1893)
- Hemerophanes hypoxantha (Holland, 1893)
- Heteronygmia flavescens Holland, 1893
- Heteronygmia manicata (Aurivillius, 1892)
- Laelia barsineides Holland, 1893
- Laelia basibrunnea (Holland, 1893)
- Laelia hypoleucis Holland, 1893
- Laelia lignicolor Holland, 1893
- Laelia nubifuga (Holland, 1893)
- Laelia omissa (Holland, 1893)
- Laelia stigmatica (Holland, 1893)
- Leucoma fusca (Hering, 1926)
- Leucoma gracillima Holland, 1893
- Leucoma luteipes (Walker, 1855)
- Leucoma nigripes (Holland, 1893)
- Leucoma ogovensis (Holland, 1893)
- Leucoma xanthocephala (Hering, 1926)
- Leucoma xanthosoma Saalmüller, 1884
- Lomadonta erythrina Holland, 1893
- Marbla divisa (Walker, 1855)
- Olapa imitans Aurivillius, 1910
- Olene basalis (Walker, 1855)
- Otroeda hesperia (Cramer, 1779)
- Otroeda nerina (Drury, 1780)
- Otroeda permagnifica Holland, 1893
- Otroeda vesperina Walker, 1854
- Paqueta infima (Holland, 1893)
- Pirga mirabilis (Aurivillius, 1891)
- Rahona bicornuta Dall'Asta, 1981
- Rahona caeruleibasalis Dall'Asta, 1981
- Rahona collenettei Dall'Asta, 1981
- Rahona hayesi Dall'Asta, 1981
- Rahona subzairensis Dall'Asta, 1981
- Rahona unica Dall'Asta, 1981
- Stracena bananoides (Hering, 1927)
- Stracena eximia (Holland, 1893)
- Stracena promelaena (Holland, 1893)
- Terphothrix lanaria Holland, 1893
- Terphothrix tenuis (Holland, 1893)
- Usimbara lata (Holland, 1893)

== Metarbelidae ==
- Haberlandia lindacammae Lehmann, 2011
- Haberlandia odzalaensis Lehmann, 2011
- Haberlandia shimonii Lehmann, 2011
- Haberlandia legraini Lehmann, 2011
- Lebedodes cossula Holland, 1893
- Metarbela stivafer Holland, 1893

== Noctuidae ==
- Achaea xanthodera (Holland, 1894)
- Acontia citrelinea Bethune-Baker, 1911
- Acontia glaphyra Holland, 1894
- Aegocera rectilinea Boisduval, 1836
- Aegocera tigrina (Druce, 1882)
- Ametropalpis vidua (Holland, 1894)
- Callopistria complicata (Holland, 1894)
- Callopistria cornuscopiae (Holland, 1894)
- Callopistria maillardi (Guenée, 1862)
- Cerynea flavicostata (Holland, 1894)
- Chalciope pusilla (Holland, 1894)
- Crameria amabilis (Drury, 1773)
- Ctenoplusia dorfmeisteri (Felder & Rogenhofer, 1874)
- Ctenoplusia furcifera (Walker, 1857)
- Dysgonia conjunctura (Walker, 1858)
- Dysgonia humilis Holland, 1894
- Dysgonia multilineata (Holland, 1894)
- Dysgonia palpalis (Walker, 1865)
- Eutelia menalcas (Holland, 1894)
- Eutelia morosa (Holland, 1894)
- Eutelia solitaria (Holland, 1894)
- Eutelia strigula Holland, 1894
- Feliniopsis annosa (Viette, 1963)
- Heliophisma catocalina Holland, 1894
- Heraclia aemulatrix (Westwood, 1881)
- Heraclia deficiens (Mabille & Vuillot, 1892)
- Heraclia geryon (Fabricius, 1781)
- Heraclia hornimani (Druce, 1880)
- Heraclia medeba (Druce, 1880)
- Hypotuerta transiens (Hampson, 1901)
- Lophoruza semiscripta (Mabille, 1893)
- Marcipa aequatorialis Pelletier, 1975
- Marcipa argyrosemioides Pelletier, 1975
- Marcipa bernardii Pelletier, 1974
- Marcipa mariaeclarae Pelletier, 1975
- Marcipa splendens Pelletier, 1975
- Marcipalina laportei (Pelletier, 1975)
- Marcipalina violacea (Pelletier, 1974)
- Masalia galatheae (Wallengren, 1856)
- Mimasura clara (Holland, 1893)
- Nyodes brevicornis (Walker, 1857)
- Omphaloceps triangularis (Mabille, 1893)
- Ophiusa david (Holland, 1894)
- Ophiusa despecta (Holland, 1894)
- Ophiusa verecunda (Holland, 1894)
- Oruza divisa (Walker, 1862)
- Oruza latifera (Walker, 1869)
- Ozarba domina (Holland, 1894)
- Parachalciope benitensis (Holland, 1894)
- Parachalciope binaria (Holland, 1894)
- Parachalciope inornata (Holland, 1894)
- Plecopterodes moderata (Wallengren, 1860)
- Plusiopalpa dichora Holland, 1894
- Plusiotricha livida Holland, 1894
- Pseudoarcte melanis (Mabille, 1890)
- Sarothroceras banaka (Plötz, 1880)
- Schausia gladiatoria (Holland, 1893)
- Sciatta inconcisa Walker, 1869
- Soloe trigutta Walker, 1854
- Soloella guttivaga (Walker, 1854)
- Sypnoides equatorialis (Holland, 1894)
- Thyas rubricata (Holland, 1894)
- Thysanoplusia sestertia (Felder & Rogenhofer, 1874)

== Nolidae ==
- Blenina chloromelana (Mabille, 1890)
- Blenina chrysochlora (Walker, 1865)
- Earias ogovana Holland, 1893
- Eligma hypsoides (Walker, 1869)
- Gigantoceras geometroptera Holland, 1893
- Gigantoceras solstitialis Holland, 1893
- Hypodeva barbata Holland, 1894
- Metaleptina albibasis Holland, 1893
- Metaleptina nigribasis Holland, 1893
- Metaleptina obliterata Holland, 1893
- Negeta mesoleuca (Holland, 1894)
- Nola chia (Holland, 1894)
- Nola juvenis (Holland, 1893)
- Odontestis prosticta (Holland, 1894)
- Periplusia cinerascens Holland, 1894
- Periplusia nubilicosta Holland, 1894
- Plusiocalpe pallida Holland, 1894
- Westermannia anchorita Holland, 1893
- Westermannia goodi Hampson, 1912

== Notodontidae ==
- Acroctena pallida (Butler, 1882)
- Afrocerura cameroona (Bethune-Baker, 1927)
- Antheua gallans (Karsch, 1895)
- Antheua simplex Walker, 1855
- Antitrotonotus gabonensis Kiriakoff, 1966
- Aoba grassei Kiriakoff, 1966
- Aoba tosta Kiriakoff, 1965
- Arciera grisea (Holland, 1893)
- Bernardita albiplagiata (Gaede, 1928)
- Bisolita minuta (Holland, 1893)
- Blacodes friedae Kiriakoff, 1959
- Bostrychogyna bella (Bethune-Baker, 1913)
- Brachychira alternata Kiriakoff, 1966
- Brachychira argentina Kiriakoff, 1955
- Brachychira bernardii Kiriakoff, 1966
- Brachychira destituta Kiriakoff, 1966
- Brachychira dives Kiriakoff, 1960
- Brachychira excellens (Rothschild, 1917)
- Brachychira exusta Kiriakoff, 1966
- Brachychira incerta Kiriakoff, 1966
- Brachychira murina Kiriakoff, 1966
- Brachychira punctulata Kiriakoff, 1966
- Brachychira subargentea Kiriakoff, 1955
- Catarctia biseriata (Plötz, 1880)
- Catarctia divisa (Walker, 1855)
- Catarctia terminipuncta Hampson, 1910
- Cerurina marshalli (Hampson, 1910)
- Deinarchia apateloides (Holland, 1893)
- Desmeocraera bitioides (Holland, 1893)
- Desmeocraera chloeropsis (Holland, 1893)
- Desmeocraera falsa (Holland, 1893)
- Desmeocraera formosa Kiriakoff, 1958
- Desmeocraera glauca Gaede, 1928
- Desmeocraera hinnula Holland, 1893
- Desmeocraera latex (Druce, 1901)
- Desmeocraera propinqua (Holland, 1893)
- Desmeocraera squamipennis (Holland, 1893)
- Desmeocraera varia (Walker, 1855)
- Desmeocraerula conspicuana Kiriakoff, 1968
- Desmeocraerula inconspicuana Strand, 1912
- Desmeocraerula pallida Kiriakoff, 1963
- Desmeocraerula senicula Kiriakoff, 1963
- Desmeocraerula subangulata Kiriakoff, 1968
- Desmeocraerula viridipicta Kiriakoff, 1963
- Dinotodonta longa Holland, 1893
- Elaphrodes duplex (Gaede, 1928)
- Enomotarcha chloana (Holland, 1893)
- Epanaphe carteri (Walsingham, 1885)
- Epanaphe clara (Holland, 1893)
- Epidonta brunneomixta (Mabille, 1897)
- Epidonta transversa (Gaede, 1928)
- Epitrotonotus vilis (Holland, 1893)
- Eurystauridia dorsalis Kiriakoff, 1967
- Galanthella arctipennis (Holland, 1893)
- Galanthella evides Kiriakoff, 1959
- Harpandrya aeola Bryk, 1913
- Harpandrya cinerea Kiriakoff, 1966
- Harpandrya gemella Kiriakoff, 1966
- Harpandrya josepha Kiriakoff, 1966
- Harpandrya rea Kiriakoff, 1966
- Harpandrya recussa Kiriakoff, 1966
- Iridoplitis theodorus Kiriakoff, 1967
- Janthinisca flavescens Kiriakoff, 1960
- Janthinisca flavipennis (Hampson, 1910)
- Janthinisca signifera (Holland, 1893)
- Macronadata collaris Möschler, 1887
- Macronadata tigris Kiriakoff, 1966
- Macrosenta longicauda Holland, 1893
- Mesonadata quinquemaculata Kiriakoff, 1960
- Odontoperas archonta Kiriakoff, 1959
- Odontoperas cyanogramma Kiriakoff, 1968
- Odontoperas dentigera Kiriakoff, 1962
- Odontoperas lineata Kiriakoff, 1968
- Paratrotonotus ogovensis (Holland, 1893)
- Peratodonta olivacea Gaede, 1928
- Peratodonta umbrosa Kiriakoff, 1968
- Pittheides chloauchena (Holland, 1893)
- Pseudobarobata denticulata Kiriakoff, 1966
- Pseudobarobata integra Kiriakoff, 1966
- Pseudoscrancia africana (Holland, 1893)
- Pyrsopsyche pyrrhias Kiriakoff, 1968
- Quista arenacea Kiriakoff, 1968
- Quista conformis Kiriakoff, 1968
- Quista niveiplaga (Hampson, 1910)
- Quista subcarnea Kiriakoff, 1968
- Scalmicauda acamas Kiriakoff, 1968
- Scalmicauda actor Kiriakoff, 1968
- Scalmicauda afra Kiriakoff, 1968
- Scalmicauda agasthenes Kiriakoff, 1968
- Scalmicauda albobrunnea Kiriakoff, 1968
- Scalmicauda amphion Kiriakoff, 1968
- Scalmicauda ancaeus Kiriakoff, 1968
- Scalmicauda andraemon Kiriakoff, 1968
- Scalmicauda antiphus Kiriakoff, 1968
- Scalmicauda astyoche Kiriakoff, 1968
- Scalmicauda benga Holland, 1893
- Scalmicauda bernardii Kiriakoff, 1968
- Scalmicauda bicolorata Gaede, 1928
- Scalmicauda brevipennis (Holland, 1893)
- Scalmicauda chalcedona Kiriakoff, 1968
- Scalmicauda corona Kiriakoff, 1968
- Scalmicauda decorata Kiriakoff, 1962
- Scalmicauda epistrophus Kiriakoff, 1968
- Scalmicauda eumela Kiriakoff, 1968
- Scalmicauda fuscinota Aurivillius, 1904
- Scalmicauda hoesemanni (Strand, 1911)
- Scalmicauda lineata (Holland, 1893)
- Scalmicauda lycaon Kiriakoff, 1968
- Scalmicauda macrosema Kiriakoff, 1959
- Scalmicauda myrine Kiriakoff, 1968
- Scalmicauda oileus Kiriakoff, 1968
- Scalmicauda orthogramma Kiriakoff, 1960
- Scalmicauda pandarus Kiriakoff, 1968
- Scalmicauda paucinotata Kiriakoff, 1959
- Scalmicauda phorcys Kiriakoff, 1968
- Scalmicauda podarce Kiriakoff, 1968
- Scalmicauda pylaemenes Kiriakoff, 1968
- Scalmicauda talaeon Kiriakoff, 1968
- Scalmicauda tessmanni (Strand, 1911)
- Scalmicauda thessala Kiriakoff, 1968
- Scalmicauda uniarcuata Kiriakoff, 1962
- Scrancia aesalon Kiriakoff, 1967
- Scrancia atribasalis Kiriakoff, 1967
- Scrancia hypotriorchis Kiriakoff, 1967
- Scrancia modesta Holland, 1893
- Scrancia nisus Kiriakoff, 1967
- Scrancia osica Kiriakoff, 1967
- Scrancia tinnunculus Kiriakoff, 1967
- Stauropussa chloe (Holland, 1893)
- Synete aberrans Kiriakoff, 1968
- Synete argentescens (Hampson, 1910)
- Synete boops Kiriakoff, 1968
- Synete frugalis Kiriakoff, 1959
- Synete julia Kiriakoff, 1968
- Synete olivaceofusca (Rothschild, 1917)
- Synete schistacea Kiriakoff, 1968
- Synete semiarcuata Kiriakoff, 1968
- Synete streptopelia Kiriakoff, 1959
- Synete ursula Kiriakoff, 1968
- Tmetopteryx bisecta (Rothschild, 1917)
- Trabanta ignobilis (Holland, 1893)
- Tricholoba atriclathrata Hampson, 1910
- Tricholoba immodica Strand, 1911
- Tricholoba intensiva Gaede, 1928
- Tricholoba trisignata Strand, 1911

== Psychidae ==
- Eumeta cervina Druce, 1887
- Eumeta rougeoti Bourgogne, 1955
- Eumeta strandi Bourgogne, 1955

== Pterophoridae ==
- Emmelina lochmaius (Bigot, 1974)
- Pterophorus candidalis (Walker, 1864)
- Pterophorus lampra (Bigot, 1969)

== Saturniidae ==
- Athletes ethra (Westwood, 1849)
- Bunaeopsis aurantiaca (Rothschild, 1895)
- Carnegia mirabilis (Aurivillius, 1895)
- Epiphora albidus (Druce, 1886)
- Epiphora berliozi (Rougeot, 1948)
- Epiphora gabonensis (Testout, 1936)
- Epiphora testouti (Rougeot, 1948)
- Goodia lunata Holland, 1893
- Goodia nubilata Holland, 1893
- Imbrasia epimethea (Drury, 1772)
- Imbrasia longicaudata Holland, 1894
- Lobobunaea goodi (Holland, 1893)
- Lobobunaea melanoneura (Rothschild, 1907)
- Lobobunaea niepelti Strand, 1914
- Ludia orinoptena Karsch, 1892
- Micragone agathylla (Westwood, 1849)
- Micragone colettae Rougeot, 1959
- Micragone lichenodes (Holland, 1893)
- Micragone martinae Rougeot, 1952
- Micragone mirei Darge, 1990
- Nudaurelia anthinoides Rougeot, 1978
- Nudaurelia bouvieri (Le Moult, 1933)
- Nudaurelia dione (Fabricius, 1793)
- Nudaurelia dionysiae Rougeot, 1948
- Nudaurelia eblis Strecker, 1876
- Nudaurelia melanops (Bouvier, 1930)
- Orthogonioptilum bernardii Bouyer, 1990
- Orthogonioptilum diabolicum Rougeot, 1971
- Orthogonioptilum luminosa (Bouvier, 1930)
- Orthogonioptilum modestum Rougeot, 1965
- Orthogonioptilum ochraceum Rougeot, 1958
- Orthogonioptilum piersoni Bouyer, 1989
- Orthogonioptilum subueleense Rougeot, 1972
- Orthogonioptilum vestigiata (Holland, 1893)
- Pseudantheraea discrepans (Butler, 1878)
- Pseudantheraea imperator Rougeot, 1962
- Pseudimbrasia deyrollei (J. Thomson, 1858)
- Tagoropsis genoviefae Rougeot, 1950

== Sesiidae ==
- Albuna dybowskyi Le Cerf, 1917
- Alonina longipes (Holland, 1894)
- Chamanthedon brillians (Beutenmüller, 1899)
- Chamanthedon tropica (Beutenmüller, 1899)
- Conopia gabuna (Beutenmüller, 1899)
- Conopia leucogaster Hampson, 1919
- Conopia nuba (Beutenmüller, 1899)
- Conopia olenda (Beutenmüller, 1899)
- Episannina ellenbergeri Le Cerf, 1917
- Episannina perlucida (Le Cerf, 1911)
- Macrotarsipus africanus (Beutenmüller, 1899)
- Melittia azrael Le Cerf, 1914
- Similipepsis violacea Le Cerf, 1911
- Synanthedon nyanga (Beutenmüller, 1899)
- Tipulamima festiva (Beutenmüller, 1899)
- Tipulamima flavifrons Holland, 1894
- Tipulamima haugi (Le Cerf, 1917)
- Tipulamima malimba (Beutenmüller, 1899)

== Sphingidae ==
- Acanthosphinx guessfeldti (Dewitz, 1879)
- Acherontia atropos (Linnaeus, 1758)
- Agrius convolvuli (Linnaeus, 1758)
- Antinephele achlora Holland, 1893
- Antinephele camerounensis Clark, 1937
- Antinephele efulani Clark, 1926
- Antinephele lunulata Rothschild & Jordan, 1903
- Antinephele maculifera Holland, 1889
- Antinephele marcida Holland, 1893
- Antinephele muscosa Holland, 1889
- Atemnora westermannii (Boisduval, 1875)
- Avinoffia hollandi (Clark, 1917)
- Basiothia charis (Boisduval, 1875)
- Basiothia medea (Fabricius, 1781)
- Centroctena rutherfordi (Druce, 1882)
- Cephonodes hylas (Linnaeus, 1771)
- Chloroclanis virescens (Butler, 1882)
- Coelonia fulvinotata (Butler, 1875)
- Daphnis nerii (Linnaeus, 1758)
- Euchloron megaera (Linnaeus, 1758)
- Falcatula cymatodes (Rothschild & Jordan, 1912)
- Grillotius bergeri (Darge, 1973)
- Hippotion balsaminae (Walker, 1856)
- Hippotion celerio (Linnaeus, 1758)
- Hippotion eson (Cramer, 1779)
- Hippotion irregularis (Walker, 1856)
- Hippotion osiris (Dalman, 1823)
- Hyles livornica (Esper, 1780)
- Hypaedalea butleri Rothschild, 1894
- Hypaedalea insignis Butler, 1877
- Leptoclanis pulchra Rothschild & Jordan, 1903
- Leucophlebia afra Karsch, 1891
- Leucostrophus commasiae (Walker, 1856)
- Lycosphingia hamatus (Dewitz, 1879)
- Macroglossum trochilus (Hübner, 1823)
- Macropoliana natalensis (Butler, 1875)
- Neopolyptychus convexus (Rothschild & Jordan, 1903)
- Neopolyptychus pygarga (Karsch, 1891)
- Neopolyptychus serrator (Jordan, 1929)
- Nephele accentifera (Palisot de Beauvois, 1821)
- Nephele aequivalens (Walker, 1856)
- Nephele bipartita Butler, 1878
- Nephele comma Hopffer, 1857
- Nephele discifera Karsch, 1891
- Nephele funebris (Fabricius, 1793)
- Nephele maculosa Rothschild & Jordan, 1903
- Nephele oenopion (Hübner, [1824])
- Nephele peneus (Cramer, 1776)
- Nephele rectangulata Rothschild, 1895
- Nephele rosae Butler, 1875
- Pantophaea favillacea (Walker, 1866)
- Phylloxiphia bicolor (Rothschild, 1894)
- Phylloxiphia formosa (Schultze, 1914)
- Phylloxiphia goodii (Holland, 1889)
- Phylloxiphia illustris (Rothschild & Jordan, 1906)
- Phylloxiphia karschi (Rothschild & Jordan, 1903)
- Phylloxiphia oberthueri (Rothschild & Jordan, 1903)
- Phylloxiphia oweni (Carcasson, 1968)
- Phylloxiphia vicina (Rothschild & Jordan, 1915)
- Platysphinx constrigilis (Walker, 1869)
- Platysphinx stigmatica (Mabille, 1878)
- Platysphinx vicaria Jordan, 1920
- Poliana buchholzi (Plötz, 1880)
- Polyptychoides digitatus (Karsch, 1891)
- Polyptychus affinis Rothschild & Jordan, 1903
- Polyptychus andosa Walker, 1856
- Polyptychus anochus Rothschild & Jordan, 1906
- Polyptychus baltus Pierre, 1985
- Polyptychus barnsi Clark, 1926
- Polyptychus bernardii Rougeot, 1966
- Polyptychus carteri (Butler, 1882)
- Polyptychus enodia (Holland, 1889)
- Polyptychus herbuloti Darge, 1990
- Polyptychus hollandi Rothschild & Jordan, 1903
- Polyptychus lapidatus Joicey & Kaye, 1917
- Polyptychus murinus Rothschild, 1904
- Polyptychus nigriplaga Rothschild & Jordan, 1903
- Polyptychus orthographus Rothschild & Jordan, 1903
- Polyptychus paupercula (Holland, 1889)
- Polyptychus rougeoti Carcasson, 1968
- Polyptychus sinus Pierre, 1985
- Polyptychus thihongae Bernardi, 1970
- Polyptychus trisecta (Aurivillius, 1901)
- Pseudenyo benitensis Holland, 1889
- Pseudoclanis admatha Pierre, 1985
- Pseudoclanis occidentalis Rothschild & Jordan, 1903
- Rhadinopasa hornimani (Druce, 1880)
- Rufoclanis rosea (Druce, 1882)
- Sphingonaepiopsis nana (Walker, 1856)
- Temnora angulosa Rothschild & Jordan, 1906
- Temnora atrofasciata Holland, 1889
- Temnora avinoffi Clark, 1919
- Temnora camerounensis Clark, 1923
- Temnora crenulata (Holland, 1893)
- Temnora curtula Rothschild & Jordan, 1908
- Temnora elegans (Rothschild, 1895)
- Temnora elisabethae Hering, 1930
- Temnora eranga (Holland, 1889)
- Temnora fumosa (Walker, 1856)
- Temnora funebris (Holland, 1893)
- Temnora griseata Rothschild & Jordan, 1903
- Temnora hollandi Clark, 1920
- Temnora iapygoides (Holland, 1889)
- Temnora livida (Holland, 1889)
- Temnora nephele Clark, 1922
- Temnora ntombi Darge, 1975
- Temnora pseudopylas (Rothschild, 1894)
- Temnora radiata (Karsch, 1892)
- Temnora rattrayi Rothschild, 1904
- Temnora reutlingeri (Holland, 1889)
- Temnora sardanus (Walker, 1856)
- Temnora scitula (Holland, 1889)
- Temnora spiritus (Holland, 1893)
- Temnora stevensi Rothschild & Jordan, 1903
- Temnora wollastoni Rothschild & Jordan, 1908
- Temnora zantus (Herrich-Schäffer, 1854)
- Theretra jugurtha (Boisduval, 1875)
- Theretra orpheus (Herrich-Schäffer, 1854)
- Xanthopan morganii (Walker, 1856)

== Thyrididae ==
- Arniocera viridifasciata (Aurivillius, 1900)
- Byblisia setipes (Plötz, 1880)
- Chrysotypus luteofuscus Whalley, 1971
- Dysodia collinsi Whalley, 1968
- Marmax hyparchus (Cramer, 1779)
- Marmax semiaurata (Walker, 1854)
- Ninia plumipes (Drury, 1782)
- Toosa longipes (Holland, 1896)
- Trichobaptes auristrigata (Plötz, 1880)

== Tineidae ==
- Cimitra efformata (Gozmány, 1965)
- Perissomastix mili Gozmány, 1965

== Tortricidae ==
- Accra ornata Razowski, 1966
- Eccopsis wahlbergiana Zeller, 1852
- Idiothauma africanum Walsingham, 1897
- Mictocommosis argus (Walsingham, 1897)

== Zygaenidae ==
- Chalconycles chloauges (Holland, 1893)
- Homophylotis obscurissimus (Holland, 1893)
- Syringura triplex (Plötz, 1880)
