= List of moths of the Republic of the Congo =

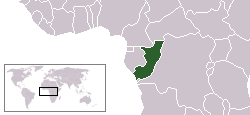
Location of the Republic of the Congo

There are about 380 known moth species in the Republic of the Congo. The moths (mostly nocturnal) and butterflies (mostly diurnal) make up the taxonomic order Lepidoptera.

This is a list of moth species recorded in the Republic of the Congo.

== Adelidae ==
- Ceromitia systelitis Meyrick, 1921
- Nemophora parvella (Walker, 1863)

== Alucitidae ==
- Alucita balioxantha (Meyrick, 1921)
- Alucita imbrifera (Meyrick, 1929)
- Alucita sertifera (Meyrick, 1921)

== Anomoeotidae ==
- Anomoeotes nox Aurivillius, 1907
- Thermochrous fumicincta Hampson, 1910

== Arctiidae ==
- Afrasura obliterata (Walker, 1864)
- Aglossosia deceptans Hampson, 1914
- Amata creobota (Holland, 1893)
- Amata francisca (Butler, 1876)
- Amata goodii (Holland, 1893)
- Amata interniplaga (Mabille, 1890)
- Amata leimacis (Holland, 1893)
- Amata marina (Butler, 1876)
- Amerila vitrea Plötz, 1880
- Anaphosia cyanogramma Hampson, 1903
- Anapisa crenophylax (Holland, 1893)
- Anapisa melaleuca (Holland, 1898)
- Anapisa monotica (Holland, 1893)
- Apisa canescens Walker, 1855
- Archithosia costimacula (Mabille, 1878)
- Balacra daphaena (Hampson, 1898)
- Balacra flavimacula Walker, 1856
- Balacra haemalea Holland, 1893
- Balacra pulchra Aurivillius, 1892
- Balacra rubricincta Holland, 1893
- Boadicea pelecoides Tams, 1930
- Caripodia chrysargyria Hampson, 1900
- Ceryx albimacula (Walker, 1854)
- Ceryx elasson (Holland, 1893)
- Creatonotos leucanioides Holland, 1893
- Cyana rubristriga (Holland, 1893)
- Euchromia guineensis (Fabricius, 1775)
- Euchromia lethe (Fabricius, 1775)
- Hippurarctia taymansi (Rothschild, 1910)
- Mecistorhabdia haematoessa (Holland, 1893)
- Meganaclia sippia (Plötz, 1880)
- Metarctia burra (Schaus & Clements, 1893)
- Metarctia haematica Holland, 1893
- Metarctia inconspicua Holland, 1892
- Metarctia paulis Kiriakoff, 1961
- Metarctia rufescens Walker, 1855
- Myopsyche elachista (Holland, 1893)
- Myopsyche miserabilis (Holland, 1893)
- Myopsyche ochsenheimeri (Boisduval, 1829)
- Myopsyche puncticincta (Holland, 1893)
- Nanna eningae (Plötz, 1880)
- Neophemula vitrina (Oberthür, 1909)
- Nyctemera apicalis (Walker, 1854)
- Nyctemera xanthura (Plötz, 1880)
- Ovenna vicaria (Walker, 1854)
- Pusiola melemona (Kiriakoff, 1963)
- Pusiola theresia (Kiriakoff, 1963)
- Rhipidarctia invaria (Walker, 1856)
- Trichaeta fulvescens (Walker, 1854)
- Trichaeta pterophorina (Mabille, 1892)

== Autostichidae ==
- Autosticha nothriforme (Walsingham, 1897)

== Carposinidae ==
- Meridarchis luteus (Walsingham, 1897)

== Choreutidae ==
- Anthophila equatoris (Walsingham, 1897)
- Anthophila flavimaculata (Walsingham, 1891)
- Brenthia octogemmifera Walsingham, 1897

== Crambidae ==
- Cotachena smaragdina (Butler, 1875)
- Palpita elealis (Walker, 1859)

== Elachistidae ==
- Ethmia rhomboidella Walsingham, 1897
- Microcolona pantomima Meyrick, 1917

== Eriocottidae ==
- Compsoctena media Walsingham, 1897
- Compsoctena secundella (Walsingham, 1897)

== Eupterotidae ==
- Jana eurymas Herrich-Schäffer, 1854
- Jana gracilis Walker, 1855
- Jana preciosa Aurivillius, 1893
- Jana strigina Westwood, 1849
- Phiala albida Plötz, 1880
- Phiala subiridescens (Holland, 1893)
- Stenoglene bipunctatus (Aurivillius, 1909)

== Gelechiidae ==
- Bactropaltis lithosema Meyrick, 1939
- Dichomeris eurynotus (Walsingham, 1897)
- Dichomeris marmoratus (Walsingham, 1891)
- Ptilothyris crossoceros Meyrick, 1934
- Ptilothyris purpurea Walsingham, 1897
- Theatrocopia elegans Walsingham, 1897
- Theatrocopia roseoviridis Walsingham, 1897

== Geometridae ==
- Aletis erici Kirby, 1896
- Anacleora diffusa (Walker, 1869)
- Aphilopota mailaria (Swinhoe, 1904)
- Aphilopota strigosissima (Bastelberger, 1909)
- Biston abruptaria (Walker, 1869)
- Braueriana fiorino Bryk, 1913
- Chiasmia majestica (Warren, 1901)
- Chiasmia streniata (Guenée, 1858)
- Chrysocraspeda abdominalis (Herbulot, 1984)
- Chrysocraspeda rubripennis (Warren, 1898)
- Colocleora binoti Herbulot, 1983
- Colocleora ducleri Herbulot, 1983
- Colocleora linearis Herbulot, 1985
- Colocleora sanghana Herbulot, 1985
- Colocleora smithi (Warren, 1904)
- Conolophia persimilis (Warren, 1905)
- Dorsifulcrum cephalotes (Walker, 1869)
- Epigynopteryx prophylacis Herbulot, 1984
- Euproutia aggravaria (Guenée, 1858)
- Hypochrosis banakaria (Plötz, 1880)
- Hypomecis dedecora (Herbulot, 1985)
- Idaea inquisita (Prout, 1932)
- Melinoessa sodaliata (Walker, 1862)
- Melinoessa stramineata (Walker, 1869)
- Mesomima tenuifascia (Holland, 1893)
- Miantochora picturata Herbulot, 1985
- Mimaletis postica (Walker, 1869)
- Oxyfidonia umbrina Herbulot, 1985
- Piercia myopteryx Prout, 1935
- Pitthea catadela D. S. Fletcher, 1963
- Pitthea cunaxa Druce, 1887
- Pitthea famula Drury, 1773
- Pitthea perspicua (Linnaeus, 1758)
- Prasinocyma congrua (Walker, 1869)
- Psilocladia loxostigma Prout, 1915
- Racotis squalida (Butler, 1878)
- Scopula macrocelis (Prout, 1915)
- Semiothisa testaceata (Walker, 1863)
- Somatina chalyboeata (Walker, 1869)
- Terina circumdata Walker, 1865
- Terina crocea Hampson, 1910
- Terina latifascia Walker, 1854
- Terina niphanda Druce, 1887
- Xenochroma silvatica Herbulot, 1984
- Xylopteryx triphaenata Herbulot, 1984
- Zamarada modesta Herbulot, 1985
- Zeuctoboarmia ochracea Herbulot, 1985

== Glyphipterigidae ==
- Glyphipterix gemmatella (Walker, 1864)

== Gracillariidae ==
- Stomphastis thraustica (Meyrick, 1908)

== Himantopteridae ==
- Pedoptila thaletes Druce, 1907
- Semioptila semiflava Talbot, 1928
- Semioptila seminigra Talbot, 1928

== Hyblaeidae ==
- Hyblaea occidentalium Holland, 1894

== Immidae ==
- Moca radiata (Walsingham, 1897)

== Lacturidae ==
- Gymnogramma atmocycla Meyrick, 1918
- Gymnogramma hollandi (Walsingham, 1897)

== Lasiocampidae ==
- Cheligium choerocampoides (Holland, 1893)
- Cheligium nigrescens (Aurivillius, 1909)
- Cheligium pinheyi Zolotuhin & Gurkovich, 2009
- Euwallengrenia reducta (Walker, 1855)
- Gelo jordani (Tams, 1936)
- Grellada imitans (Aurivillius, 1893)
- Grellada marshalli (Aurivillius, 1902)
- Lechriolepis tessmanni Strand, 1912
- Leipoxais marginepunctata Holland, 1893
- Leipoxais rufobrunnea Strand, 1912
- Mimopacha gerstaeckerii (Dewitz, 1881)
- Mimopacha knoblauchii (Dewitz, 1881)
- Muzunguja rectilineata (Aurivillius, 1900)
- Nepehria olivia Gurkovich & Zolotuhin, 2010
- Odontocheilopteryx conzolia Gurkovich & Zolotuhin, 2009
- Odontocheilopteryx phoneus Hering, 1928
- Opisthoheza heza Zolotuhin & Prozorov, 2010
- Pachymeta contraria (Walker, 1855)
- Pachyna subfascia (Walker, 1855)
- Pachytrina gliharta Zolotuhin & Gurkovich, 2009
- Pachytrina honrathii (Dewitz, 1881)
- Pachytrina philargyria (Hering, 1928)
- Pachytrina rubra (Tams, 1929)
- Pachytrina trihora Zolotuhin & Gurkovich, 2009
- Pallastica lateritia (Hering, 1928)
- Pallastica meloui (Riel, 1909)
- Pallastica sericeofasciata (Aurivillius, 1921)
- Pehria umbrina (Aurivillius, 1909)
- Schausinna clementsi (Schaus, 1897)
- Sonitha libera (Aurivillius, 1914)
- Stenophatna hollandi (Tams, 1929)
- Stenophatna kahli (Tams, 1929)
- Theophasida obusta (Tams, 1929)
- Theophasida valkyria Zolotuhin & Prozorov, 2010

== Lecithoceridae ==
- Odites cuculans Meyrick, 1918

== Limacodidae ==
- Parasa chapmani Kirby, 1892
- Zinara nervosa Walker, 1869

== Lymantriidae ==
- Euproctis pygmaea (Walker, 1855)
- Knappetra fasciata (Walker, 1855)
- Naroma signifera Walker, 1856
- Olapa tavetensis (Holland, 1892)
- Otroeda manifesta (Swinhoe, 1903)

== Noctuidae ==
- Acantholipes circumdata (Walker, 1858)
- Achaea jamesoni L. B. Prout, 1919
- Acontia citrelinea Bethune-Baker, 1911
- Aegocera fervida (Walker, 1854)
- Aegocera obliqua Mabille, 1893
- Aegocera rectilinea Boisduval, 1836
- Aegocera tigrina (Druce, 1882)
- Agrotis catenifera Walker, 1869
- Agrotis hemileuca Walker, 1869
- Aletia consanguis (Guenée, 1852)
- Aletopus ruspina (Aurivillius, 1909)
- Argyrolopha punctilinea Prout, 1921
- Asota chionea (Mabille, 1878)
- Athetis partita (Walker, 1857)
- Callopistria maillardi (Guenée, 1862)
- Colpocheilopteryx operatrix (Wallengren, 1860)
- Egnasia scoliogramma Prout, 1921
- Epischausia dispar (Rothschild, 1896)
- Ericeia congregata (Walker, 1858)
- Ericeia lituraria (Saalmüller, 1880)
- Feliniopsis kuehnei Hacker & Fibiger, 2007
- Feliniopsis parvula Hacker & Fibiger, 2007
- Feliniopsis sinaevi Hacker & Mey, 2010
- Halochroa aequatoria (Mabille, 1879)
- Helicoverpa assulta (Guenée, 1852)
- Heraclia aemulatrix (Westwood, 1881)
- Heraclia longipennis (Walker, 1854)
- Heraclia pardalina (Walker, 1869)
- Hespagarista caudata (Dewitz, 1879)
- Hypena obacerralis Walker, [1859]
- Janseodes melanospila (Guenée, 1852)
- Mentaxya ignicollis (Walker, 1857)
- Metagarista maenas (Herrich-Schäffer, 1853)
- Omphaloceps triangularis (Mabille, 1893)
- Ophiusa david (Holland, 1894)
- Oraesia provocans Walker, [1858]
- Schausia gladiatoria (Holland, 1893)
- Schausia leona (Schaus, 1893)
- Sciatta inconcisa Walker, 1869
- Trigonodes exportata Guenée, 1852
- Tuerta chrysochlora Walker, 1869

== Nolidae ==
- Eligma allaudi Pinhey, 1968

== Notodontidae ==
- Antheua simplex Walker, 1855
- Antheua trifasciata (Hampson, 1909)
- Arciera postalba Kiriakoff, 1960
- Arciera roseiventris Kiriakoff, 1960
- Arciera rufescens (Kiriakoff, 1962)
- Boscawenia bryki (Schultze, 1934)
- Boscawenia caradrinoides (Schultze, 1934)
- Boscawenia incerta (Schultze, 1934)
- Boscawenia jaspidea (Schultze, 1934)
- Catarctia divisa (Walker, 1855)
- Desmeocraera chloeropsis (Holland, 1893)
- Desmeocraera congoana Aurivillius, 1900
- Desmeocraera geminata Gaede, 1928
- Desmeocraera sagittata Gaede, 1928
- Epidonta insigniata (Gaede, 1932)
- Haplozana nigrolineata Aurivillius, 1901
- Scaeopteryx curvatula (Rothschild, 1917)
- Scalmicauda adusta Kiriakoff, 1963
- Scalmicauda rectilinea (Gaede, 1928)
- Scrancia stictica Hampson, 1910

== Oecophoridae ==
- Orygocera carnicolor Walsingham, 1897
- Pseudoprotasis canariella Walsingham, 1897

== Psychidae ==
- Melasina imperfecta Meyrick, 1922
- Melasina polycapnias Meyrick, 1922
- Melasina scrutaria Meyrick, 1922
- Mesopolia inconspicua Walsingham, 1897
- Narycia centropa Meyrick, 1922

== Pterophoridae ==
- Crocydoscelus ferrugineum Walsingham, 1897
- Lantanophaga pusillidactylus (Walker, 1864)
- Megalorhipida leucodactylus (Fabricius, 1794)
- Pterophorus candidalis (Walker, 1864)
- Pterophorus spissa (Bigot, 1969)
- Stenoptilodes taprobanes (Felder & Rogenhofer, 1875)

== Saturniidae ==
- Bunaeopsis licharbas (Maassen & Weymer, 1885)
- Decachorda congolana Bouvier, 1930
- Decachorda inspersa (Hampson, 1910)
- Epiphora congolana (Bouvier, 1929)
- Epiphora vacuna (Westwood, 1849)
- Gonimbrasia rectilineata (Sonthonnax, 1899)
- Gonimbrasia tyrrhea (Cramer, 1775)
- Goodia dimonica Darge, 2008
- Goodia hierax Jordan, 1922
- Goodia lunata Holland, 1893
- Goodia unguiculata Bouvier, 1936
- Lobobunaea phaedusa (Drury, 1782)
- Lobobunaea rosea (Sonthonnax, 1899)
- Micragone agathylla (Westwood, 1849)
- Micragone caliginosa Darge, 2010
- Micragone ducorpsi (De Fleury, 1925)
- Micragone elisabethae Bouvier, 1930
- Micragone joiceyi Bouvier, 1930
- Micragone lichenodes (Holland, 1893)
- Micragone loutemboensis Darge, 2010
- Micragone morini Rougeot, 1977
- Micragone neonubifera Rougeot, 1979
- Nudaurelia alopia Westwood, 1849
- Nudaurelia bouvieri (Le Moult, 1933)
- Nudaurelia emini (Butler, 1888)
- Orthogonioptilum andreasum Rougeot, 1967
- Orthogonioptilum fontainei Rougeot, 1962
- Orthogonioptilum prox Karsch, 1892
- Pseudantheraea discrepans (Butler, 1878)
- Pseudaphelia kaeremii Bouvier, 1927
- Pseudaphelia simplex Rebel, 1906
- Pseudimbrasia deyrollei (J. Thomson, 1858)
- Pseudobunaea parathyrrena (Bouvier, 1927)

== Sesiidae ==
- Chamanthedon brillians (Beutenmüller, 1899)
- Chamanthedon tropica (Beutenmüller, 1899)
- Conopia auronitens (Le Cerf, 1913)
- Conopia nuba (Beutenmüller, 1899)
- Conopia olenda (Beutenmüller, 1899)
- Melittia auriplumia Hampson, 1910
- Melittia occidentalis Le Cerf, 1917
- Similipepsis violacea Le Cerf, 1911
- Synanthedon albiventris (Beutenmüller, 1899)
- Tipulamima festiva (Beutenmüller, 1899)
- Tipulamima malimba (Beutenmüller, 1899)

== Sphingidae ==
- Grillotius bergeri (Darge, 1973)
- Hippotion aporodes Rothschild & Jordan, 1912
- Hippotion irregularis (Walker, 1856)
- Leucophlebia afra Karsch, 1891
- Leucostrophus commasiae (Walker, 1856)
- Neopolyptychus consimilis (Rothschild & Jordan, 1903)
- Neopolyptychus prionites (Rothschild & Jordan, 1916)
- Nephele discifera Karsch, 1891
- Nephele maculosa Rothschild & Jordan, 1903
- Nephele oenopion (Hübner, [1824])
- Nephele rectangulata Rothschild, 1895
- Nephele vau (Walker, 1856)
- Phylloxiphia bicolor (Rothschild, 1894)
- Phylloxiphia oberthueri (Rothschild & Jordan, 1903)
- Platysphinx constrigilis (Walker, 1869)
- Platysphinx stigmatica (Mabille, 1878)
- Polyptychus andosa Walker, 1856
- Polyptychus carteri (Butler, 1882)
- Polyptychus enodia (Holland, 1889)
- Polyptychus murinus Rothschild, 1904
- Polyptychus thihongae Bernardi, 1970
- Pseudoclanis admatha Pierre, 1985
- Pseudoclanis postica (Walker, 1856)
- Pseudoclanis rhadamistus (Fabricius, 1781)
- Rhadinopasa hornimani (Druce, 1880)
- Temnora albilinea Rothschild, 1904
- Temnora atrofasciata Holland, 1889
- Temnora crenulata (Holland, 1893)
- Temnora curtula Rothschild & Jordan, 1908
- Temnora eranga (Holland, 1889)
- Temnora funebris (Holland, 1893)
- Temnora griseata Rothschild & Jordan, 1903
- Temnora hollandi Clark, 1920
- Temnora livida (Holland, 1889)
- Temnora ntombi Darge, 1975
- Temnora plagiata Walker, 1856
- Temnora rattrayi Rothschild, 1904
- Temnora sardanus (Walker, 1856)
- Temnora scitula (Holland, 1889)
- Temnora spiritus (Holland, 1893)
- Temnora stevensi Rothschild & Jordan, 1903
- Theretra orpheus (Herrich-Schäffer, 1854)

== Thyrididae ==
- Arniocera viridifasciata (Aurivillius, 1900)
- Marmax semiaurata (Walker, 1854)

== Tineidae ==
- Ceratophaga vastellus (Zeller, 1852)
- Cimitra fetialis (Meyrick, 1917)
- Criticonoma episcardina (Gozmány, 1965)
- Dasyses rugosella (Stainton, 1859)
- Hyperbola zicsii Gozmány, 1965
- Machaeropteris baloghi Gozmány, 1965
- Monopis megalodelta Meyrick, 1908
- Monopis monachella (Hübner, 1796)
- Morophaga soror Gozmány, 1965
- Oxymachaeris euryzancla Meyrick, 1918
- Perissomastix pyroxantha (Meyrick, 1914)
- Pitharcha latriodes (Meyrick, 1917)
- Tiquadra lichenea Walsingham, 1897

== Tortricidae ==
- Accra viridis (Walsingham, 1891)
- Ancylis argenticiliana Walsingham, 1897
- Archips symmetra (Meyrick, 1918)
- Bactra bactrana (Kennel, 1901)
- Cydia hemisphaerana (Walsingham, 1897)
- Eccopsis praecedens Walsingham, 1897
- Enarmoniodes praetextana (Walsingham, 1897)
- Idiothauma africanum Walsingham, 1897
- Labidosa ochrostoma (Meyrick, 1918)
- Metendothenia balanacma (Meyrick, 1914)
- Mictocommosis argus (Walsingham, 1897)
- Sanguinograptis albardana (Snellen, 1872)

== Zygaenidae ==
- Astyloneura chlorotica (Hampson, 1920)
- Saliunca mimetica Jordan, 1907
- Saliunca nkolentangensis Strand, 1913
- Saliunca rubriventris Holland, 1920
