= List of moths of Chad =

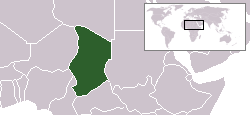
Location of Chad

There are about 50 known moth species in Chad. The moths (mostly nocturnal) and butterflies (mostly diurnal) together make up the taxonomic order Lepidoptera.

This is a list of moth species which have been recorded in Chad.

== Arctiidae ==
- Afrasura obliterata (Walker, 1864)
- Balacra pulchra Aurivillius, 1892

== Coleophoridae ==
- Nasamonica oxymorpha Meyrick, 1922

== Geometridae ==
- Brachyglossina tibbuana Herbulot, 1965
- Heterostegane monilifera Prout, 1915
- Neromia pulvereisparsa (Hampson, 1896)
- Trimetopia aetheraria Guenée, 1858
- Zamarada minimaria Swinhoe, 1895

== Lasiocampidae ==
- Pachymetana joiceyi (Tams, 1925)

== Metarbelidae ==
- Moyencharia mineti Lehmann, 2013
- Salagena cuprea Gaede, 1929

== Noctuidae ==
- Aegocera rectilinea Boisduval, 1836
- Agrotis sardzeana Brandt, 1941
- Callhyccoda mirei Herbulot & Viette, 1952
- Cardepia sociabilis de Graslin, 1850
- Clytie sancta (Staudinger, 1900)
- Cyligramma latona (Cramer, 1775)
- Diparopsis watersi (Rothschild, 1901)
- Eublemma scitula (Rambur, 1833)
- Grammodes stolida (Fabricius, 1775)
- Helicoverpa armigera (Hübner, [1808])
- Helicoverpa assulta (Guenée, 1852)
- Heliocheilus confertissima (Walker, 1865)
- Heliothis peltigera ([Denis & Schiffermüller], 1775)
- Heteropalpia acrosticta (Püngeler, 1904)
- Metopoceras kneuckeri (Rebel, 1903)
- Oraesia intrusa (Krüger, 1939)
- Pandesma robusta (Walker, 1858)
- Polytela cliens (Felder & Rogenhofer, 1874)
- Spodoptera exigua (Hübner, 1808)
- Spodoptera littoralis (Boisduval, 1833)
- Thiacidas kanoensis Hacker & Zilli, 2007

== Nolidae ==
- Earias insulana (Boisduval, 1833)

== Notodontidae ==
- Desmeocraera bitioides (Holland, 1893)

== Pterophoridae ==
- Hepalastis pumilio (Zeller, 1873)
- Megalorhipida leucodactylus (Fabricius, 1794)
- Pterophorus albidus (Zeller, 1852)
- Pterophorus candidalis (Walker, 1864)
- Sphenarches anisodactylus (Walker, 1864)
- Stenoptilodes taprobanes (Felder & Rogenhofer, 1875)

== Saturniidae ==
- Aurivillius xerophilus Rougeot, 1977
- Bunaeopsis hersilia (Westwood, 1849)
- Epiphora bauhiniae (Guérin-Méneville, 1832)
- Orthogonioptilum chalix Jordan, 1922
- Pseudimbrasia deyrollei (J. Thomson, 1858)
- Pseudobunaea heyeri (Weymer, 1896)

== Sphingidae ==
- Neopolyptychus prionites (Rothschild & Jordan, 1916)
