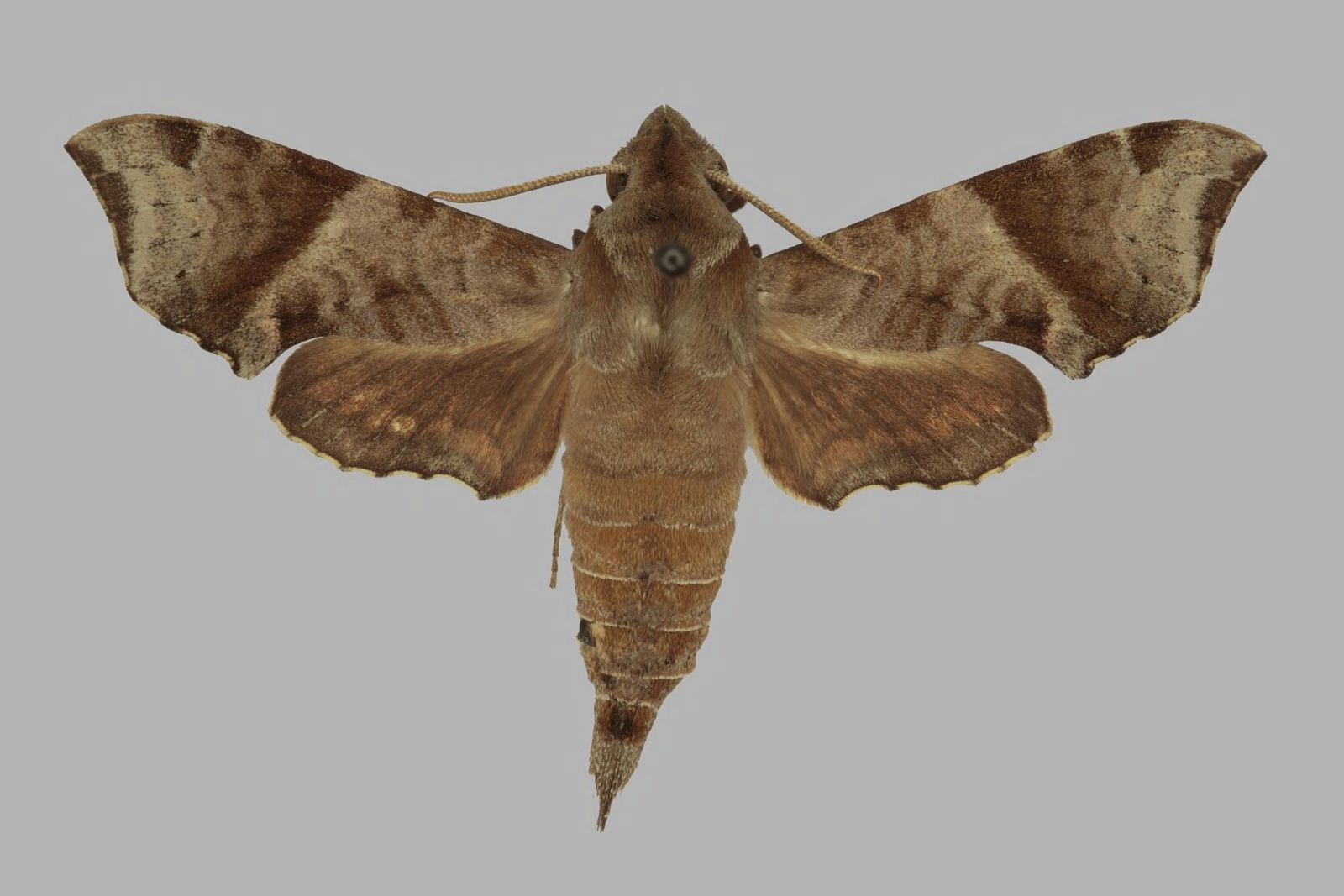

Scientific classification
- Kingdom: Animalia
- Phylum: Arthropoda
- Class: Insecta
- Order: Lepidoptera
- Family: Sphingidae
- Genus: Temnora
- Species: T. iapygoides

Binomial name
- Temnora iapygoides (Holland, 1889)

Synonyms
- Ocyton iapygoides Holland, 1889; Ocyton preussi Karsch, 1891; Pterogon clementsi Rothschild, 1894; Temnora iapygoides pernix Kernbach, 1962

= Temnora iapygoides =

Species of moth

Temnora iapygoides is a moth of the family Sphingidae. It is known from forests from Sierra Leone to Congo and Uganda, as well as Zimbabwe, Zambia, Malawi and from Tanzania to the Kenya coast.

The length of the forewings is 18–22 mm. It is similar to Temnora eranga, but the forewing upperside is lacking subapical cream markings and the postmedian cream translucent spot. Furthermore, the abdominal sternites are without white spots.
