= Eilema monochroma =

Scientific classification
- Kingdom: Animalia
- Phylum: Arthropoda
- Class: Insecta
- Order: Lepidoptera
- Superfamily: Noctuoidea
- Family: Erebidae
- Subfamily: Arctiinae
- Genus: Eilema
- Species: E. monochroma

Binomial name
- Eilema monochroma (Holland, 1893)

Synonyms
- Lepista monochroma Holland, 1893; Pumililema monochroma (Holland, 1893)

Species of moth

Eilema monochroma is a moth of the subfamily Arctiinae. It was described by William Jacob Holland in 1893. It is found in Gabon, Sierra Leone and South Africa.
