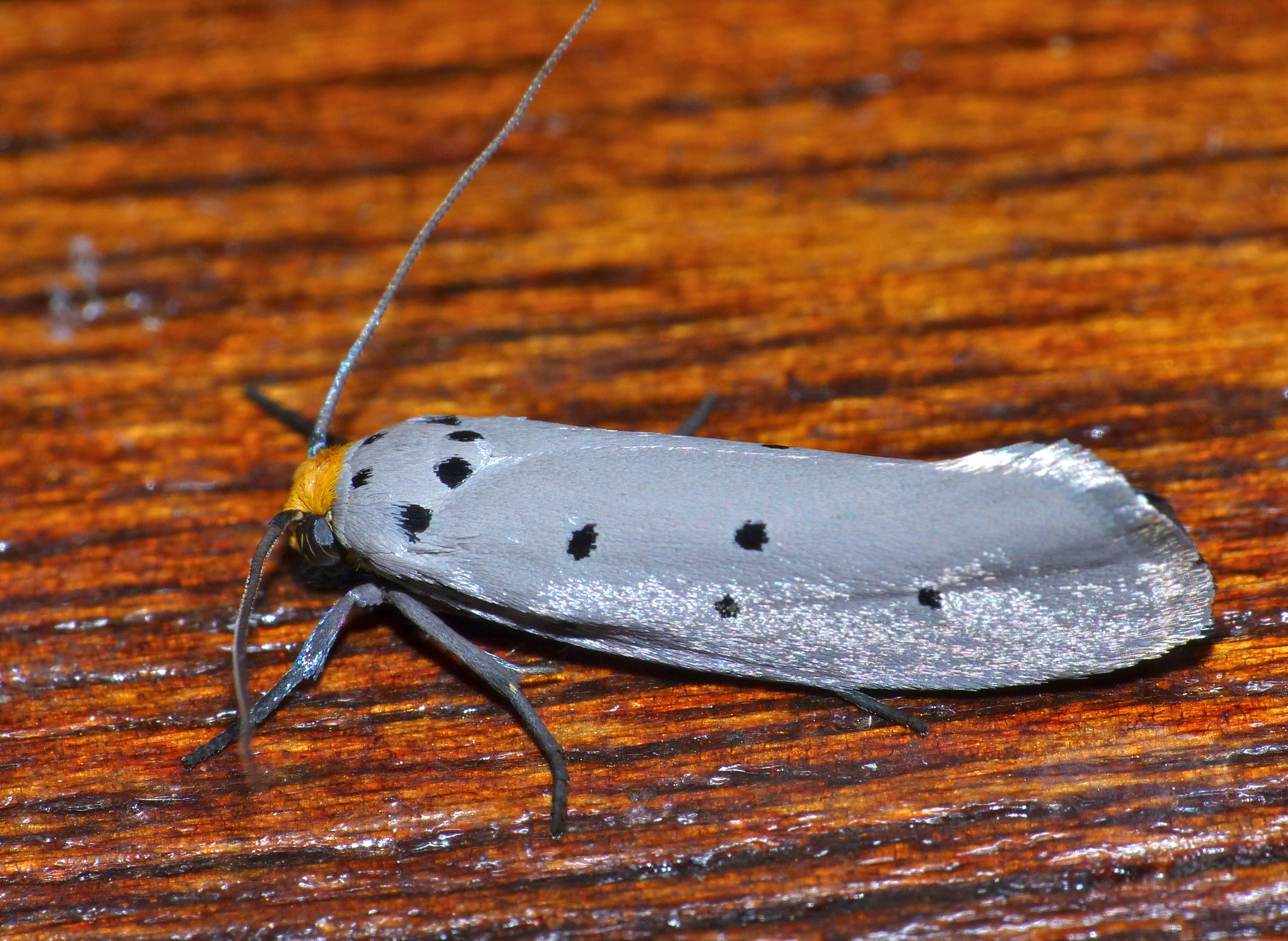
- Ethmia rhomboidella

Scientific classification
- Kingdom: Animalia
- Phylum: Arthropoda
- Class: Insecta
- Order: Lepidoptera
- Family: Depressariidae
- Genus: Ethmia
- Species: E. rhomboidella

Binomial name
- Ethmia rhomboidella Walsingham, 1897

= Ethmia rhomboidella =

Species of moth

Ethmia rhomboidella is a moth in the family Depressariidae. It is found in the Republic of Congo and South Africa.

The wingspan is about 28 mm (1.1 in). The forewings are slaty grey with six black spots: two small ones beneath the costa on the basal fourth, two larger ones on the disc, and two on the fold. Of the discal spots, one lies at the end of the cell and the other at the middle of the wing. The first of those on the fold is somewhat further removed from the base than the second subcostal spot, the other lies beyond and below the first discal spot, but nearer to it than to the second. The hindwings are stone-grey, with a slight ochreous tinge on the abdominal margin.
