= Asura erythrias =

Scientific classification
- Kingdom: Animalia
- Phylum: Arthropoda
- Class: Insecta
- Order: Lepidoptera
- Superfamily: Noctuoidea
- Family: Erebidae
- Subfamily: Arctiinae
- Genus: Asura
- Species: A. erythrias

Binomial name
- Asura erythrias (Holland, 1893)

Synonyms
- Miltochrista erythrias Holland, 1893

Species of moth

Asura erythrias is a moth of the family Erebidae. It is found in western Africa.
