= Ametropalpis vidua =

Scientific classification
- Kingdom: Animalia
- Phylum: Arthropoda
- Class: Insecta
- Order: Lepidoptera
- Family: Erebidae
- Subfamily: Catocalinae
- Genus: Ametropalpis
- Species: A. vidua

Binomial name
- Ametropalpis vidua (Holland, 1894)

Synonyms
- Eugorna vidua Holland, 1894; Dichromia vidua (Holland, 1894)

Species of moth

Ametropalpis vidua is a moth of the family Erebidae first described by William Jacob Holland in 1894. It is found in Cameroon, Gabon, Rwanda and Uganda.

The classification of this moth is disputed. Robert W. Poole (1989) treats it as a synonym of Ametropalpis though Martin Lödl (1996) excluded this species from Ametropalpis and Hypeninae and transferred the genus to Catocalinae.

== Biology ==
The adults have a wingspan of 49–53 mm.
