= Asura temperata =

Scientific classification
- Kingdom: Animalia
- Phylum: Arthropoda
- Class: Insecta
- Order: Lepidoptera
- Superfamily: Noctuoidea
- Family: Erebidae
- Subfamily: Arctiinae
- Genus: Asura
- Species: A. temperata

Binomial name
- Asura temperata (Holland, 1893)

Synonyms
- Cabarda temperata Holland, 1893

Species of moth

Asura temperata is a moth of the family Erebidae. It is found in Gabon.
