= Scopula megalostigma =

Scientific classification
- Kingdom: Animalia
- Phylum: Arthropoda
- Clade: Pancrustacea
- Class: Insecta
- Order: Lepidoptera
- Family: Geometridae
- Genus: Scopula
- Species: S. megalostigma

Binomial name
- Scopula megalostigma (Prout, 1915)

Synonyms
- Acidalia megalostigma Prout, 1915

Species of geometer moth in subfamily Sterrhinae

Scopula megalostigma is a moth of the family Geometridae. It is found in Gabon.
