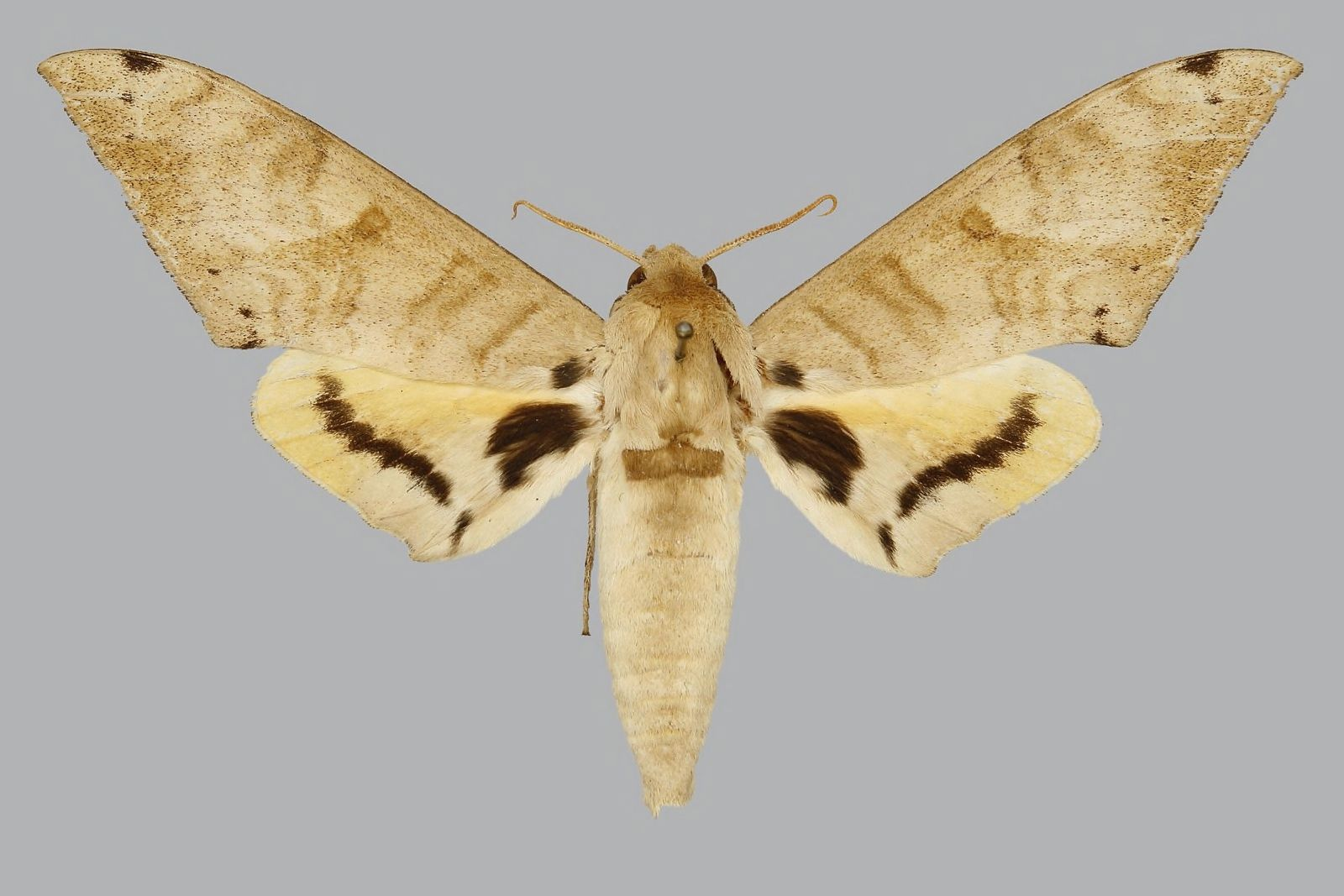

Scientific classification
- Kingdom: Animalia
- Phylum: Arthropoda
- Class: Insecta
- Order: Lepidoptera
- Family: Sphingidae
- Tribe: Smerinthini
- Genus: Pierreclanis; Eitschberger, 2007
- Species: P. admatha

Binomial name
- Pierreclanis admatha (Pierre, 1985)

Synonyms
- Pseudoclanis admatha Pierre, 1985; Pseudoclanis occidentalis nigrita Gehlen, 1928

= Pierreclanis =

Genus of moths

Pierreclanis is a genus of moths in the family Sphingidae, containing only one species, Pierreclanis admatha, which is known from Guinea, Ivory Coast, Cameroon, the Central African Republic, the Democratic Republic of the Congo, the Republic of the Congo, Gabon and Ghana.
