= Chamanthedon tropica =

Scientific classification
- Kingdom: Animalia
- Phylum: Arthropoda
- Class: Insecta
- Order: Lepidoptera
- Family: Sesiidae
- Genus: Chamanthedon
- Species: C. tropica

Binomial name
- Chamanthedon tropica (Beutenmüller, 1899)

Synonyms
- Sesia tropica Beutenmüller, 1899

Species of moth

Chamanthedon tropica is a moth of the family Sesiidae. It is known from the Republic of the Congo and Gabon.
