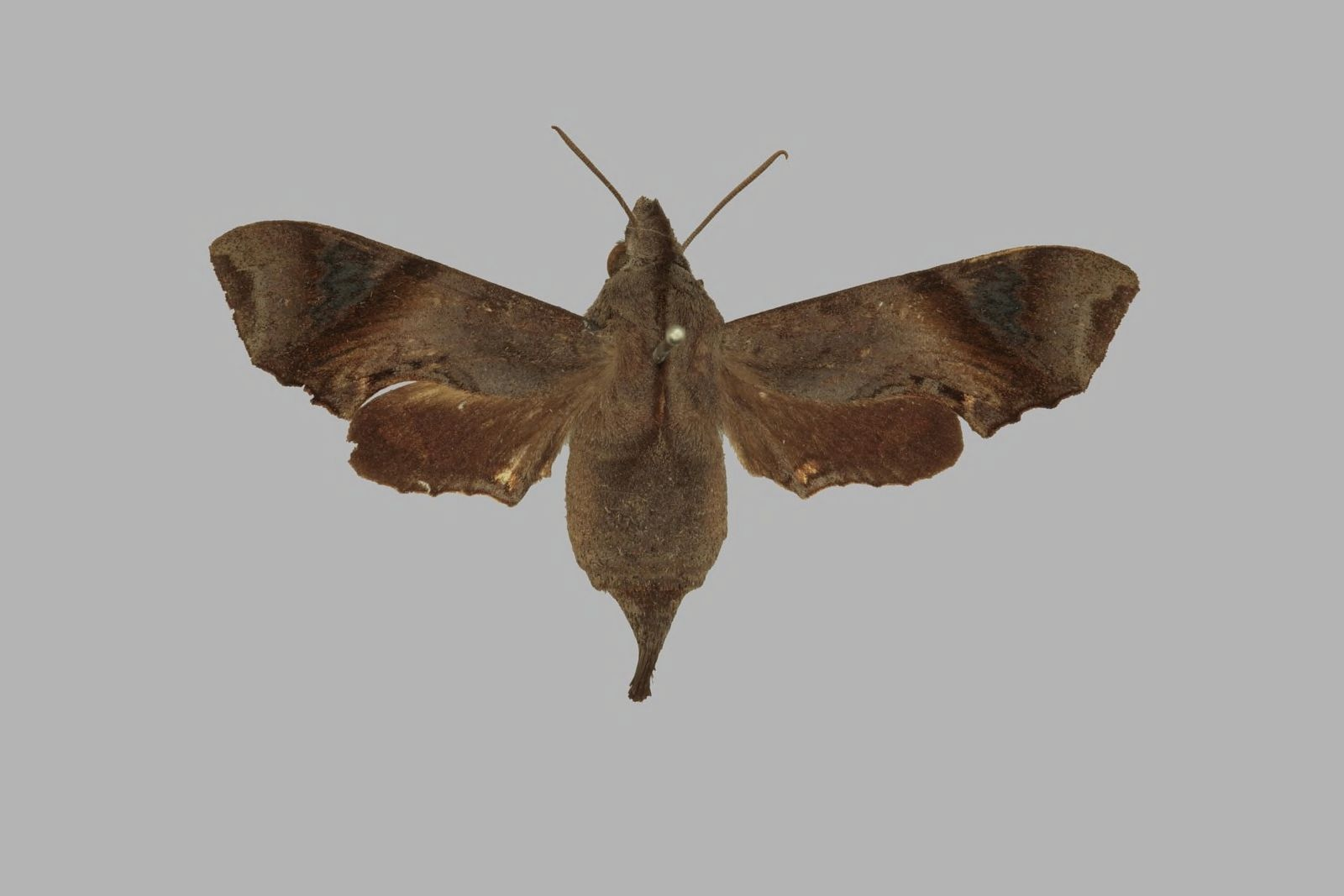

Scientific classification
- Kingdom: Animalia
- Phylum: Arthropoda
- Class: Insecta
- Order: Lepidoptera
- Family: Sphingidae
- Genus: Temnora
- Species: T. curtula

Binomial name
- Temnora curtula Rothschild & Jordan, 1908

Synonyms
- Temnora kala Darge, 1975

= Temnora curtula =

Species of moth

Temnora curtula is a moth of the family Sphingidae. It is known from forests in Congo, Uganda and western Kenya.

The length of the forewings is 17–21 mm.
