= Metarctia haematica =

Scientific classification
- Kingdom: Animalia
- Phylum: Arthropoda
- Clade: Pancrustacea
- Class: Insecta
- Order: Lepidoptera
- Superfamily: Noctuoidea
- Family: Erebidae
- Subfamily: Arctiinae
- Genus: Metarctia
- Species: M. haematica

Binomial name
- Metarctia haematica Holland, 1893

Synonyms
- Metarctia haematosphages Holland, 1893

Species of moth

Metarctia haematica is a moth of the subfamily Arctiinae. It was described by William Jacob Holland in 1893. It is found in Angola, Cameroon, the Central African Republic, the Republic of the Congo, the Democratic Republic of the Congo, Gabon, Ghana, Guinea, Kenya, Nigeria, Tanzania and Uganda.
