= Anapisa crenophylax =

Scientific classification
- Kingdom: Animalia
- Phylum: Arthropoda
- Class: Insecta
- Order: Lepidoptera
- Superfamily: Noctuoidea
- Family: Erebidae
- Subfamily: Arctiinae
- Genus: Anapisa
- Species: A. crenophylax

Binomial name
- Anapisa crenophylax (William Jacob Holland, 1893)

Synonyms
- Syntomis crenophylax Holland, 1893

Species of moth

Anapisa crenophylax is a moth of the family Erebidae. It was described by William Jacob Holland in 1893. It is found in Cameroon, the Republic of Congo and Gabon.
