= Ceryx elasson =

Scientific classification
- Kingdom: Animalia
- Phylum: Arthropoda
- Class: Insecta
- Order: Lepidoptera
- Superfamily: Noctuoidea
- Family: Erebidae
- Subfamily: Arctiinae
- Genus: Ceryx
- Species: C. elasson

Binomial name
- Ceryx elasson (Holland, 1893)

Synonyms
- Syntomis elasson Holland, 1893

Species of moth

Ceryx elasson is a moth of the subfamily Arctiinae. It was described by William Jacob Holland in 1893. It is found in Cameroon, the Republic of the Congo and Gabon.
