= Ceryx albimacula =

Scientific classification
- Kingdom: Animalia
- Phylum: Arthropoda
- Class: Insecta
- Order: Lepidoptera
- Superfamily: Noctuoidea
- Family: Erebidae
- Subfamily: Arctiinae
- Genus: Ceryx
- Species: C. albimacula

Binomial name
- Ceryx albimacula (Walker, 1854)

Synonyms
- Syntomis albimacula Walker, 1854; Syntomis constricta Butler, 1877; Syntomis leugalea Holland, 1893; Syntomis macrospila Walker, 1864; Syntomis terminalis Walker, 1854

Species of moth

Ceryx albimacula is a moth of the subfamily Arctiinae. It was described by Francis Walker in 1854. It is found in Cameroon, the Republic of the Congo, the Democratic Republic of the Congo, Equatorial Guinea, Gabon, Ghana, Ivory Coast, Nigeria and Sierra Leone.
