= Phiala subiridescens =

Scientific classification
- Kingdom: Animalia
- Phylum: Arthropoda
- Clade: Pancrustacea
- Class: Insecta
- Order: Lepidoptera
- Family: Eupterotidae
- Genus: Phiala
- Species: P. subiridescens

Binomial name
- Phiala subiridescens (Holland, 1893)

Synonyms
- Stibolepis subiridescens Holland, 1893

Species of moth

Phiala subiridescens is a moth in the family Eupterotidae. It was described by William Jacob Holland in 1893. It is found in Gabon and the Republic of the Congo.

The wingspan is 34 mm for males and 54 mm for females. The forewings of the males are pale fulvous, crossed by waved transverse basal, transverse median, transverse limbal and submarginal lines, which are produced on the hindwings. The transverse limbal line is accentuated externally on both wings by a series of small elongated whitish spots, the most conspicuous being the one nearest the apex, and those nearer the inner margins of the wings. Females are much larger than the males. Furthermore, the wings are darker reddish.
