= Amata marina =

Scientific classification
- Domain: Eukaryota
- Kingdom: Animalia
- Phylum: Arthropoda
- Class: Insecta
- Order: Lepidoptera
- Superfamily: Noctuoidea
- Family: Erebidae
- Subfamily: Arctiinae
- Genus: Amata
- Species: A. marina

Binomial name
- Amata marina (Butler, 1876)

Synonyms
- Syntomis marina Butler, 1876; Syntomis negritina Plötz, 1880; Syntomis ogovensis Holland, 1893

Species of moth

Amata marina is a moth of the family Erebidae. It was described by Arthur Gardiner Butler in 1876. It lives in Cameroon, the Republic of the Congo, the Democratic Republic of the Congo, Equatorial Guinea, Gabon, Ghana, Sierra Leone, Uganda, Zambia and Zimbabwe.
