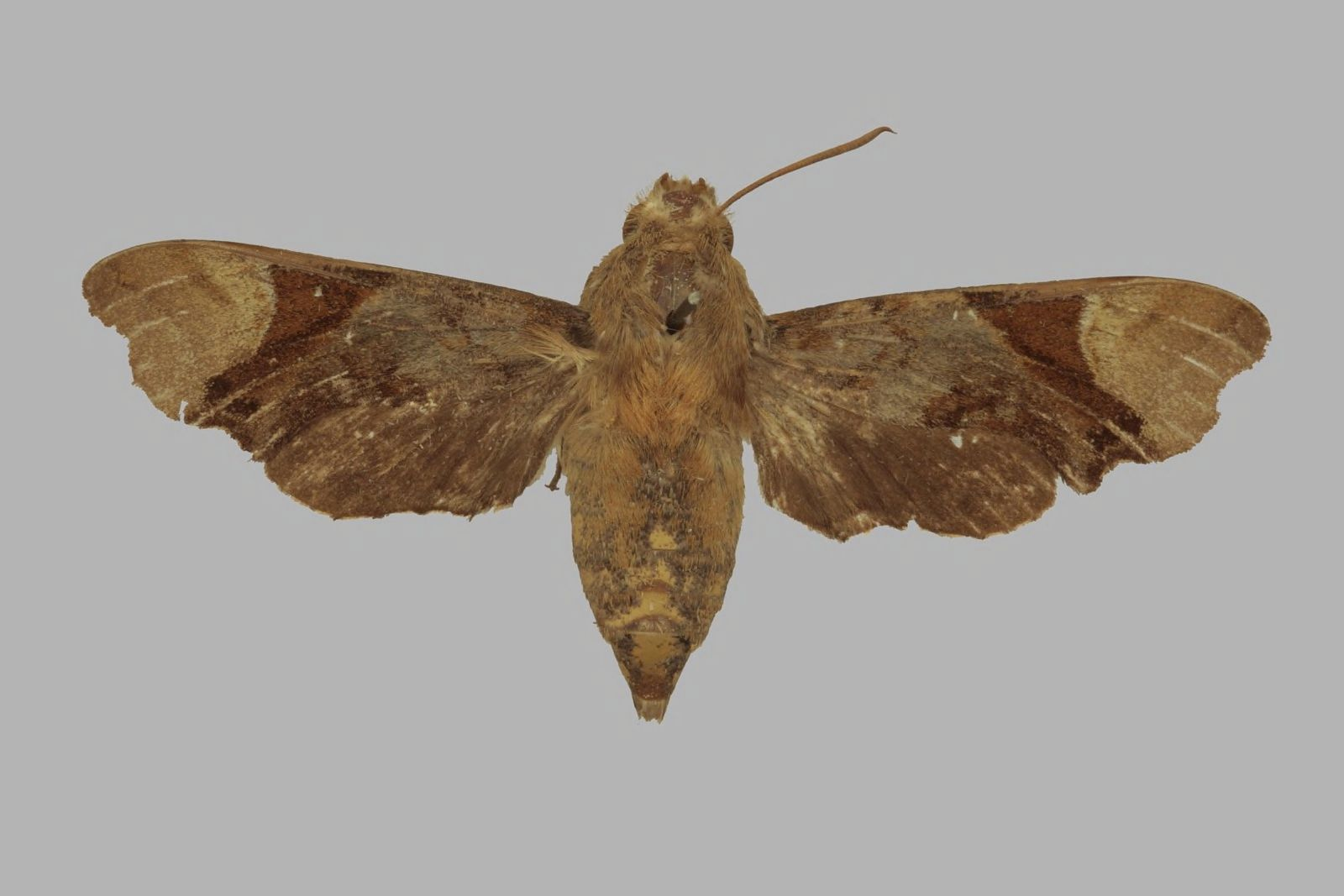
- Upper side view of a female Temnora rattrayi

Scientific classification
- Kingdom: Animalia
- Phylum: Arthropoda
- Class: Insecta
- Order: Lepidoptera
- Family: Sphingidae
- Genus: Temnora
- Species: T. rattrayi

Binomial name
- Temnora rattrayi Rothschild, 1894

= Temnora rattrayi =

Species of moth

Temnora rattrayi is a moth of the family Sphingidae. It is known from forests in Congo and Uganda.

The length of the forewings is about 16 mm for males and 17–21 mm for females.

== Subspecies ==
- Temnora rattrayi rattrayi
- Temnora rattrayi hassoni Cadiou, 2003 (Democratic Republic of the Congo)
