= Myopsyche elachista =

Scientific classification
- Domain: Eukaryota
- Kingdom: Animalia
- Phylum: Arthropoda
- Class: Insecta
- Order: Lepidoptera
- Superfamily: Noctuoidea
- Family: Erebidae
- Subfamily: Arctiinae
- Genus: Myopsyche
- Species: M. elachista

Binomial name
- Myopsyche elachista (Holland, 1893)

Synonyms
- Syntomis elachista Holland, 1893

Species of moth

Myopsyche elachista is a moth of the subfamily Arctiinae. It was described by William Jacob Holland in 1893. It is found in the Republic of the Congo and Gabon.
