= Balacra haemalea =

Scientific classification
- Kingdom: Animalia
- Phylum: Arthropoda
- Class: Insecta
- Order: Lepidoptera
- Superfamily: Noctuoidea
- Family: Erebidae
- Subfamily: Arctiinae
- Genus: Balacra
- Species: B. haemalea

Binomial name
- Balacra haemalea Holland, 1893

Species of moth

Balacra haemalea is a moth of the family Erebidae. It was described by William Jacob Holland in 1893. It is found in Cameroon, the Republic of the Congo, the Democratic Republic of the Congo Equatorial Guinea and Gabon.
