= Neophemula =

Scientific classification
- Domain: Eukaryota
- Kingdom: Animalia
- Phylum: Arthropoda
- Class: Insecta
- Order: Lepidoptera
- Superfamily: Noctuoidea
- Family: Erebidae
- Subfamily: Arctiinae
- Genus: Neophemula; Kiriakoff, 1957
- Species: N. vitrina

Binomial name
- Neophemula vitrina (Oberthür, 1909)

Genus of moths

Neophemula is a genus of moths in the family Erebidae. It contains the single species Neophemula vitrina.
