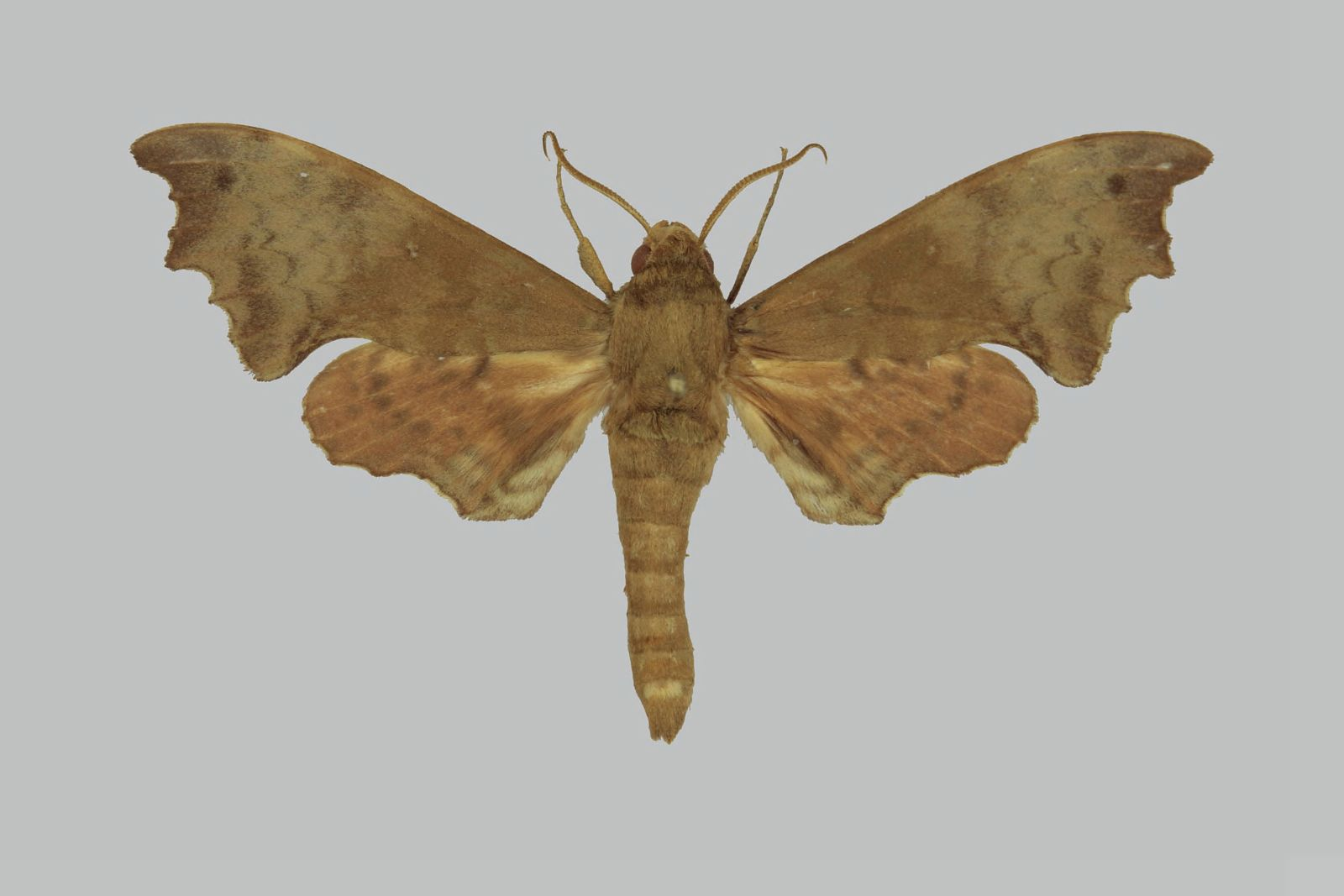

Scientific classification
- Kingdom: Animalia
- Phylum: Arthropoda
- Class: Insecta
- Order: Lepidoptera
- Family: Sphingidae
- Tribe: Smerinthini
- Genus: Grillotius; Rougeot, 1973
- Species: G. bergeri

Binomial name
- Grillotius bergeri (Darge, 1973)

Synonyms
- Temnora bergeri Darge, 1973

= Grillotius =

Genus of moths

Grillotius is a genus of moths of the family Sphingidae, containing only one species, Grillotius bergeri, which is known from Gabon, the Republic of the Congo and the Democratic Republic of the Congo.
