= Balacra rubricincta =

Scientific classification
- Domain: Eukaryota
- Kingdom: Animalia
- Phylum: Arthropoda
- Class: Insecta
- Order: Lepidoptera
- Superfamily: Noctuoidea
- Family: Erebidae
- Subfamily: Arctiinae
- Genus: Balacra
- Species: B. rubricincta

Binomial name
- Balacra rubricincta Holland, 1893

Synonyms
- Balacra ashantica Strand, 1917

Species of moth

Balacra rubricincta. is a moth of the family Erebidae. It was described by William Jacob Holland in 1893. It is found in Angola, Cameroon, the Republic of the Congo, the Democratic Republic of the Congo, Equatorial Guinea, Gabon, Ghana, Ivory Coast, Kenya, Nigeria and Uganda.
