= Archithosia costimacula =

Scientific classification
- Domain: Eukaryota
- Kingdom: Animalia
- Phylum: Arthropoda
- Class: Insecta
- Order: Lepidoptera
- Superfamily: Noctuoidea
- Family: Erebidae
- Subfamily: Arctiinae
- Genus: Archithosia
- Species: A. costimacula

Binomial name
- Archithosia costimacula Mabille, 1878

Synonyms
- Lithosia (paedia) costimacula Mabille, 1879; Sozuza decipiens Holland, 1893; Ilema quadripunctata Rothschild, 1912

Species of moth

Archithosia costimacula is a moth of the subfamily Arctiinae. It was described by Paul Mabille in 1878. It is found in Cameroon, the Republic of the Congo, Equatorial Guinea, Gabon, Ghana, Malawi, Nigeria and Uganda.
