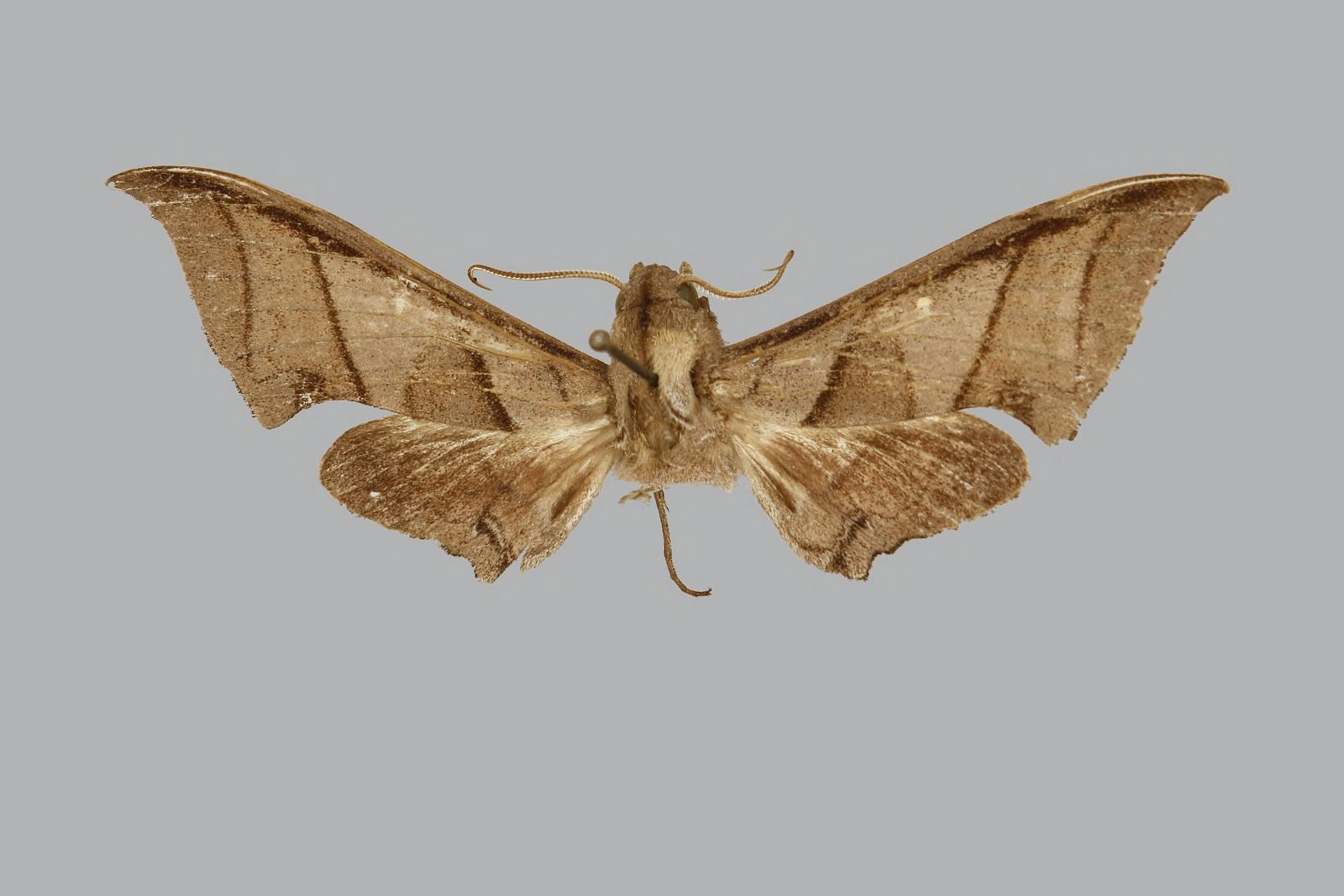
- Partial specimen

Scientific classification
- Kingdom: Animalia
- Phylum: Arthropoda
- Class: Insecta
- Order: Lepidoptera
- Family: Sphingidae
- Genus: Polyptychus
- Species: P. thihongae

Binomial name
- Polyptychus thihongae Bernardi, 1970

= Polyptychus thihongae =

Species of moth

Polyptychus thihongae is a moth of the family Sphingidae. It is known from Gabon and the Central African Republic.
