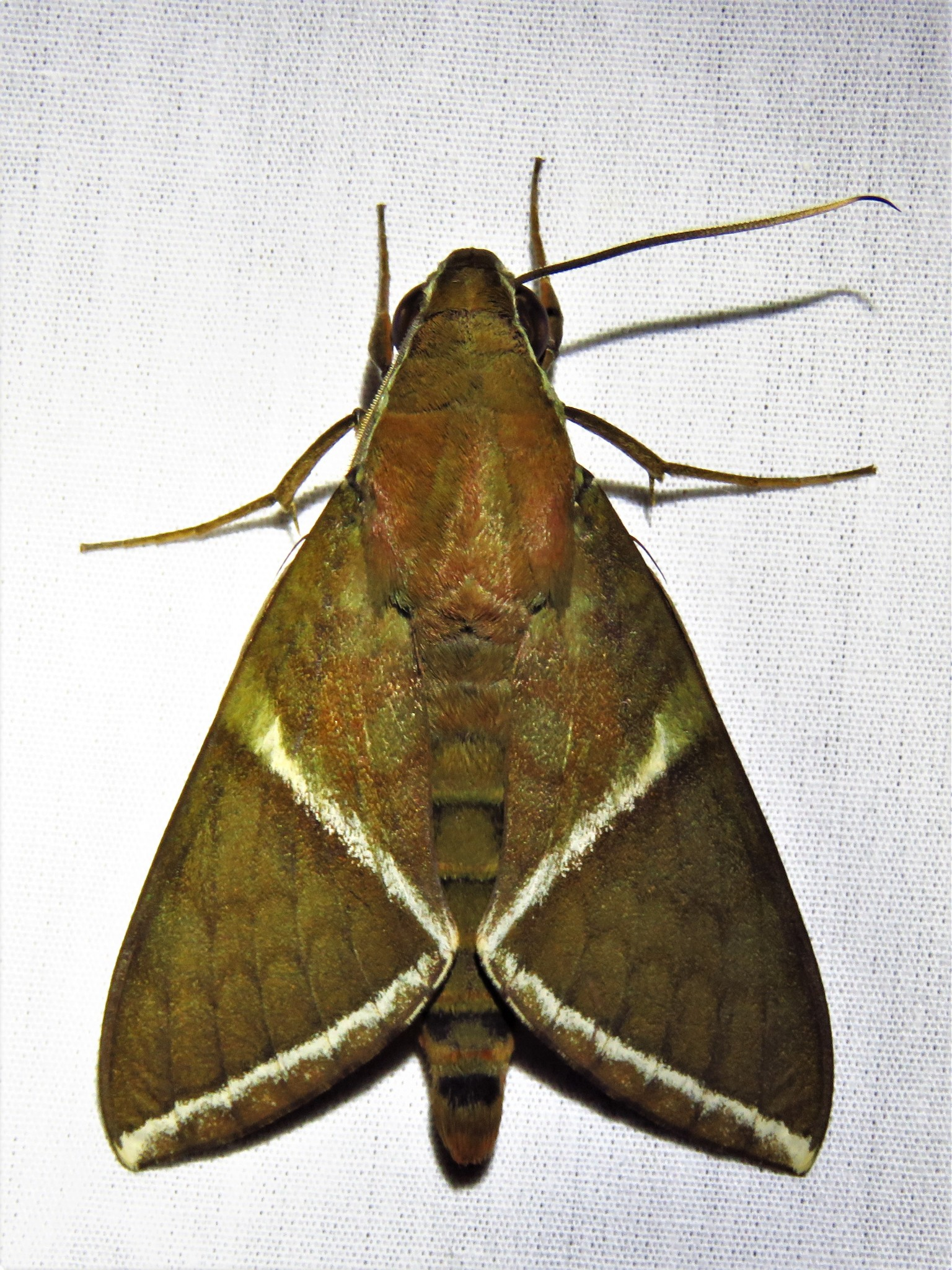

Scientific classification
- Kingdom: Animalia
- Phylum: Arthropoda
- Class: Insecta
- Order: Lepidoptera
- Family: Sphingidae
- Genus: Nephele
- Species: N. rectangulata

Binomial name
- Nephele rectangulata Rothschild, 1895

= Nephele rectangulata =

Species of moth

Nephele rectangulata is a species of moth in the family Sphingidae. It is known from African forests from Sierra Leone to Congo and Uganda.
