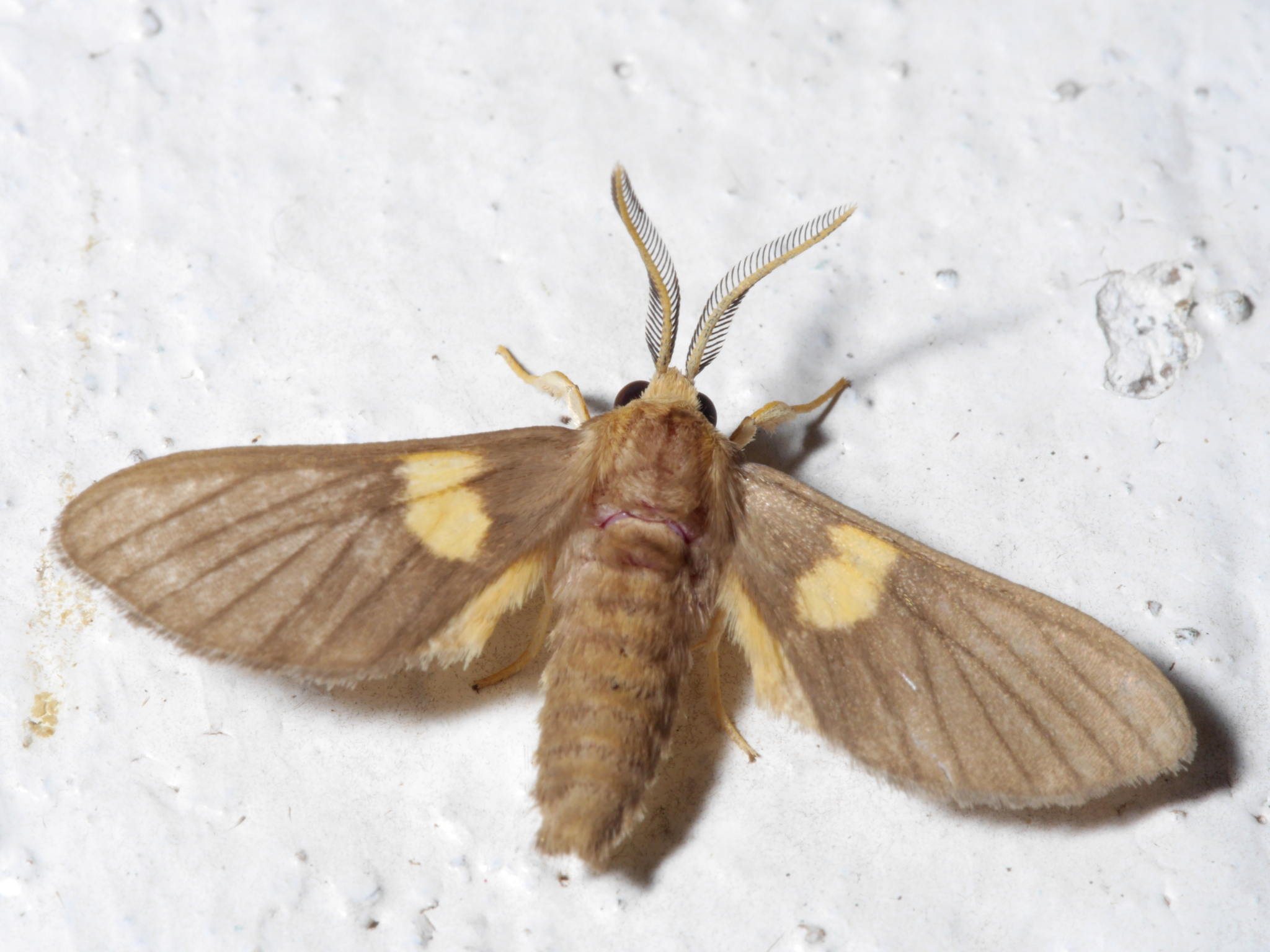

Scientific classification
- Kingdom: Animalia
- Phylum: Arthropoda
- Class: Insecta
- Order: Lepidoptera
- Superfamily: Noctuoidea
- Family: Erebidae
- Subfamily: Arctiinae
- Genus: Anapisa
- Species: A. monotica

Binomial name
- Anapisa monotica (Holland, 1893)

Synonyms
- Anace monotica Holland, 1893; Anapisa monotica ab. deannulata Strand, 1912; Apisa quadrimaculata Zerny, 1912

= Anapisa monotica =

Species of moth

Anapisa monotica is a moth belonging to the Erebidae family. It was described by William Jacob Holland in 1893. It is found in Cameroon, the Republic of the Congo, the Democratic Republic of the Congo, Gabon and Nigeria.
