= Tipulamima festiva =

Scientific classification
- Kingdom: Animalia
- Phylum: Arthropoda
- Class: Insecta
- Order: Lepidoptera
- Family: Sesiidae
- Genus: Tipulamima
- Species: T. festiva

Binomial name
- Tipulamima festiva (Beutenmüller, 1899)

Synonyms
- Sesia festiva Beutenmüller, 1899

Species of moth

Tipulamima festiva is a moth of the family Sesiidae. It is known from the Republic of the Congo, Cameroon and Gabon.
