= Synanthedon olenda =

Scientific classification
- Kingdom: Animalia
- Phylum: Arthropoda
- Clade: Pancrustacea
- Class: Insecta
- Order: Lepidoptera
- Family: Sesiidae
- Genus: Synanthedon
- Species: S. olenda

Binomial name
- Synanthedon olenda (Beutenmüller, 1899)

Synonyms
- Sesia olenda Beutenmüller, 1899; Conopia olenda

Species of moth

Synanthedon olenda is a moth of the family Sesiidae. It is known from the Republic of the Congo and Gabon.
