= Rhipidarctia invaria =

Scientific classification
- Kingdom: Animalia
- Phylum: Arthropoda
- Class: Insecta
- Order: Lepidoptera
- Superfamily: Noctuoidea
- Family: Erebidae
- Subfamily: Arctiinae
- Genus: Rhipidarctia
- Species: R. invaria

Binomial name
- Rhipidarctia invaria (Walker, 1856)

Synonyms
- Anace invaria Walker, 1856; Metarctia aurantiifusca Rothschild, 1913; Metarctia erubescens Walker, 1865; Thyretes melinos Mabille, 1890

Species of moth

Rhipidarctia invaria is a moth in the family Erebidae. It was described by Francis Walker in 1856. It is found in Angola, Cameroon, the Republic of the Congo, the Democratic Republic of the Congo, Gabon, Ivory Coast, Nigeria, Sierra Leone, Tanzania and Uganda.

The larvae feed on Cola species and Theobroma cacao.
