= Tipulamima malimba =

Scientific classification
- Kingdom: Animalia
- Phylum: Arthropoda
- Class: Insecta
- Order: Lepidoptera
- Family: Sesiidae
- Genus: Tipulamima
- Species: T. malimba

Binomial name
- Tipulamima malimba (Beutenmüller, 1899)

Synonyms
- Sesia malimba Beutenmüller, 1899

Species of moth

Tipulamima malimba is a moth of the family Sesiidae. It is known from the Republic of the Congo and Gabon.
