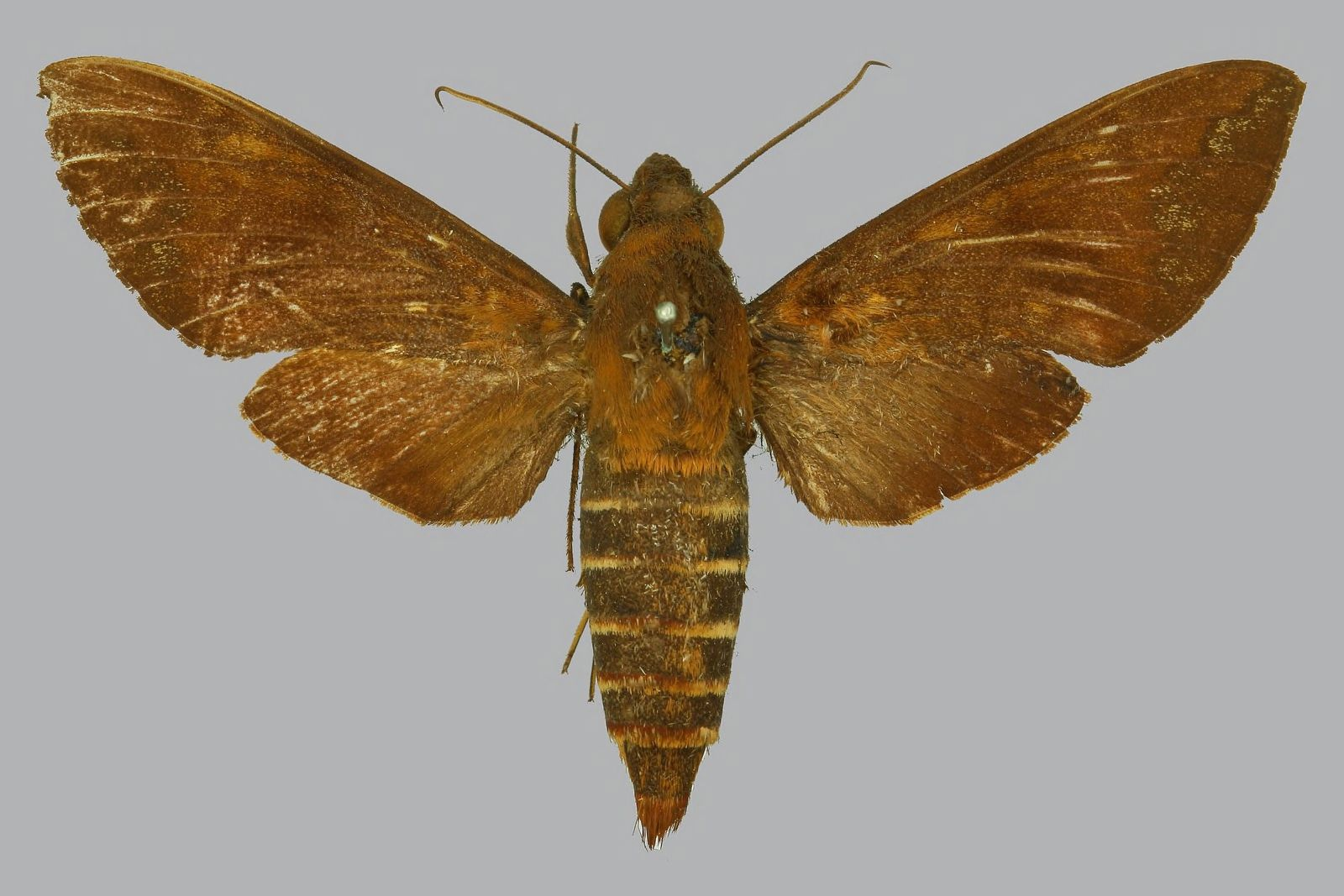

Scientific classification
- Kingdom: Animalia
- Phylum: Arthropoda
- Class: Insecta
- Order: Lepidoptera
- Family: Sphingidae
- Genus: Nephele
- Species: N. maculosa

Binomial name
- Nephele maculosa Rothschild & Jordan, 1903

Synonyms
- Nephele funebris ovifera Rothschild & Jordan, 1903

= Nephele maculosa =

Species of moth

Nephele maculosa is a moth of the family Sphingidae. It is only known from the Congo-Cameroon equatorial forest belt.
