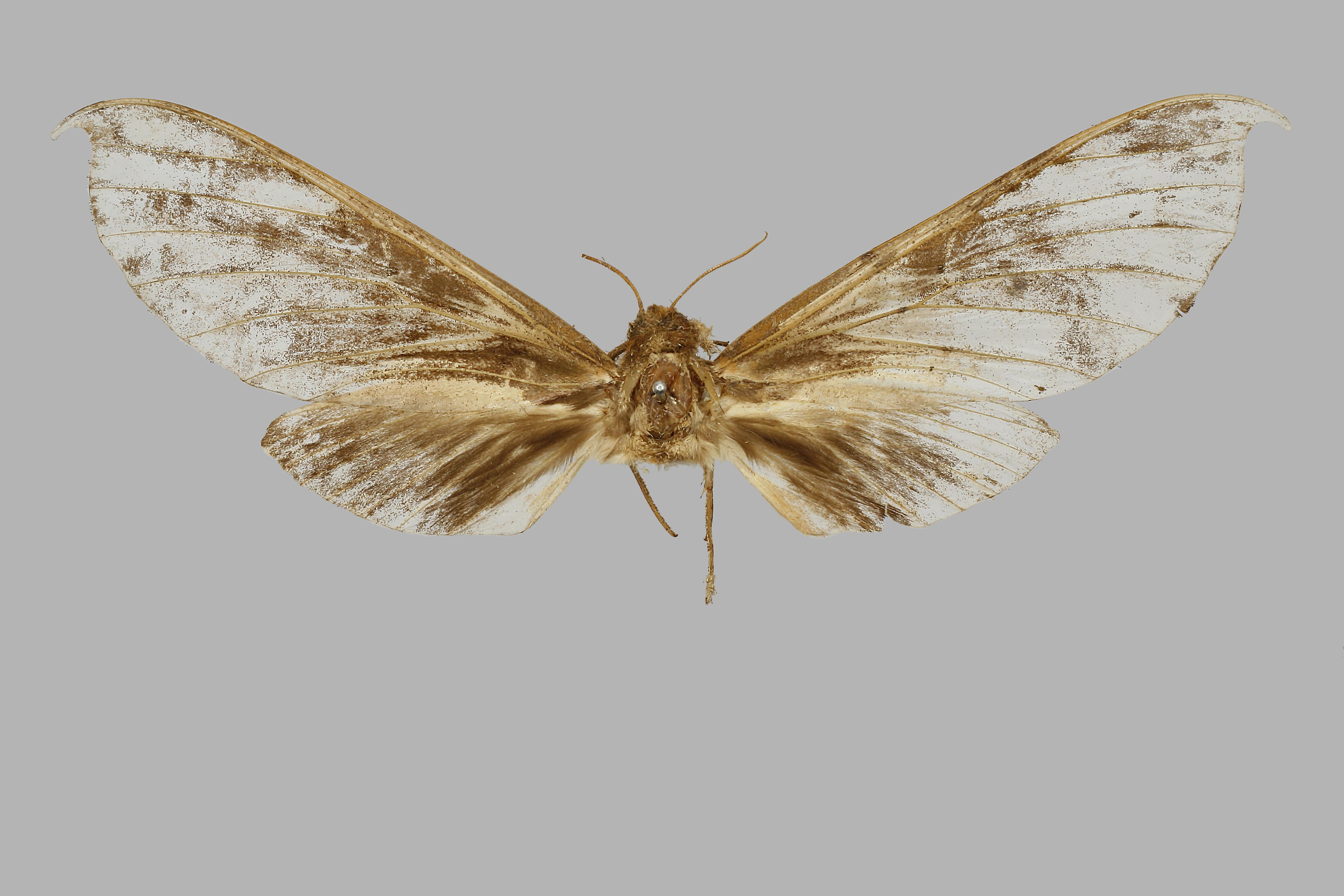

Scientific classification
- Kingdom: Animalia
- Phylum: Arthropoda
- Class: Insecta
- Order: Lepidoptera
- Family: Sphingidae
- Genus: Phylloxiphia
- Species: P. oberthueri

Binomial name
- Phylloxiphia oberthueri Rothschild & Jordan, 1903

Synonyms
- Libyoclanis hollandi Clark, 1917

= Phylloxiphia oberthueri =

Species of moth

Phylloxiphia oberthueri is a moth of the family Sphingidae. It is known from lowland forests from Liberia and Ivory Coast east to the Democratic Republic of the Congo.
