= Chamanthedon brillians =

Scientific classification
- Domain: Eukaryota
- Kingdom: Animalia
- Phylum: Arthropoda
- Class: Insecta
- Order: Lepidoptera
- Family: Sesiidae
- Genus: Chamanthedon
- Species: C. brillians

Binomial name
- Chamanthedon brillians (Beutenmüller, 1899)

Synonyms
- Sesia brillians Beutenmüller, 1899

Species of moth

Chamanthedon brillians is a moth of the family Sesiidae. It is known from the Republic of the Congo, Equatorial Guinea, Gabon and Sierra Leone.
