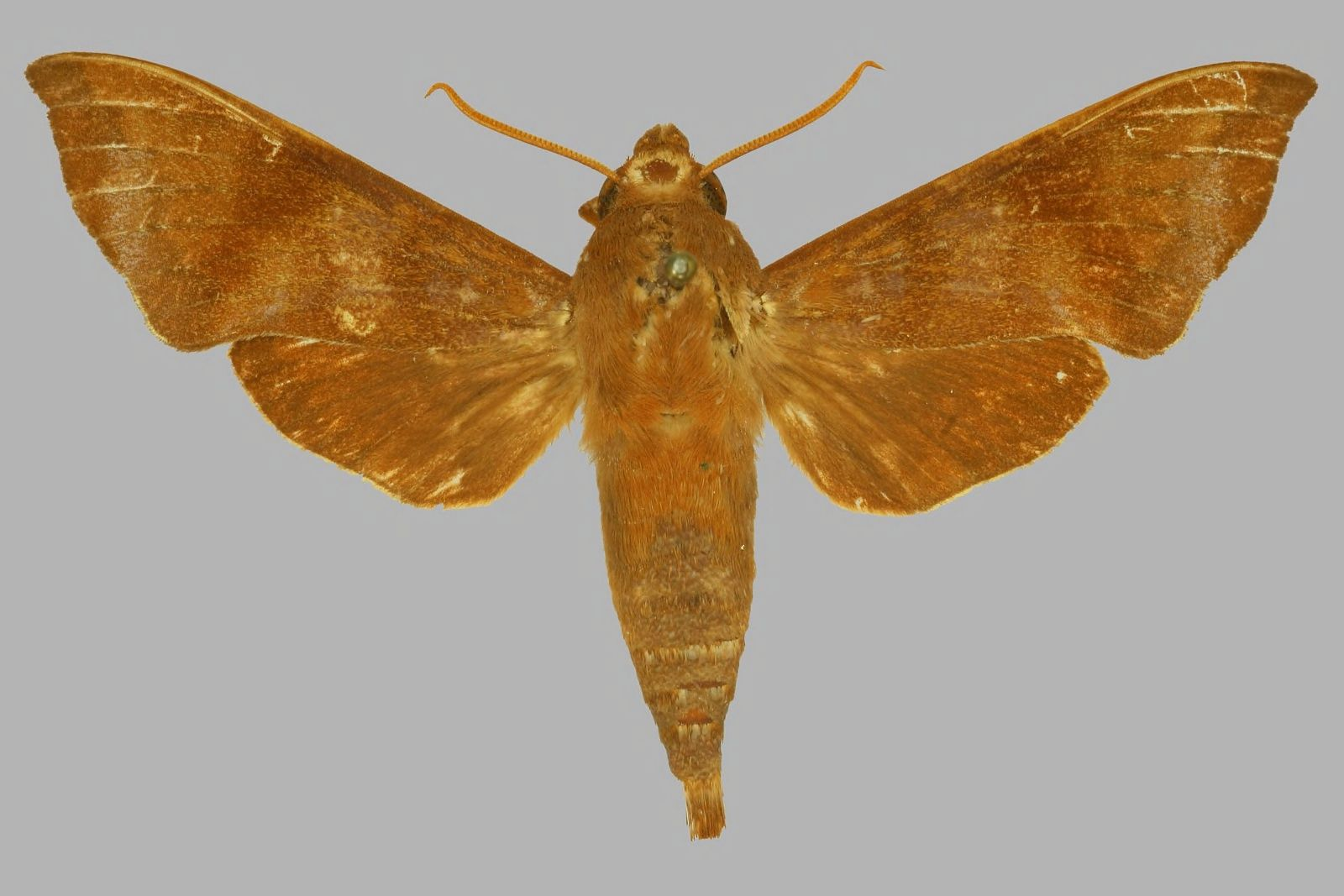
- Temnora stevensi in Nigeria

Scientific classification
- Kingdom: Animalia
- Phylum: Arthropoda
- Clade: Pancrustacea
- Class: Insecta
- Order: Lepidoptera
- Family: Sphingidae
- Genus: Temnora
- Species: T. stevensi

Binomial name
- Temnora stevensi Rothschild & Jordan, 1903

= Temnora stevensi =

Species of moth

Temnora stevensi is a moth of the family Sphingidae. It is found in forests from Sierra Leone to the southern Congo.
