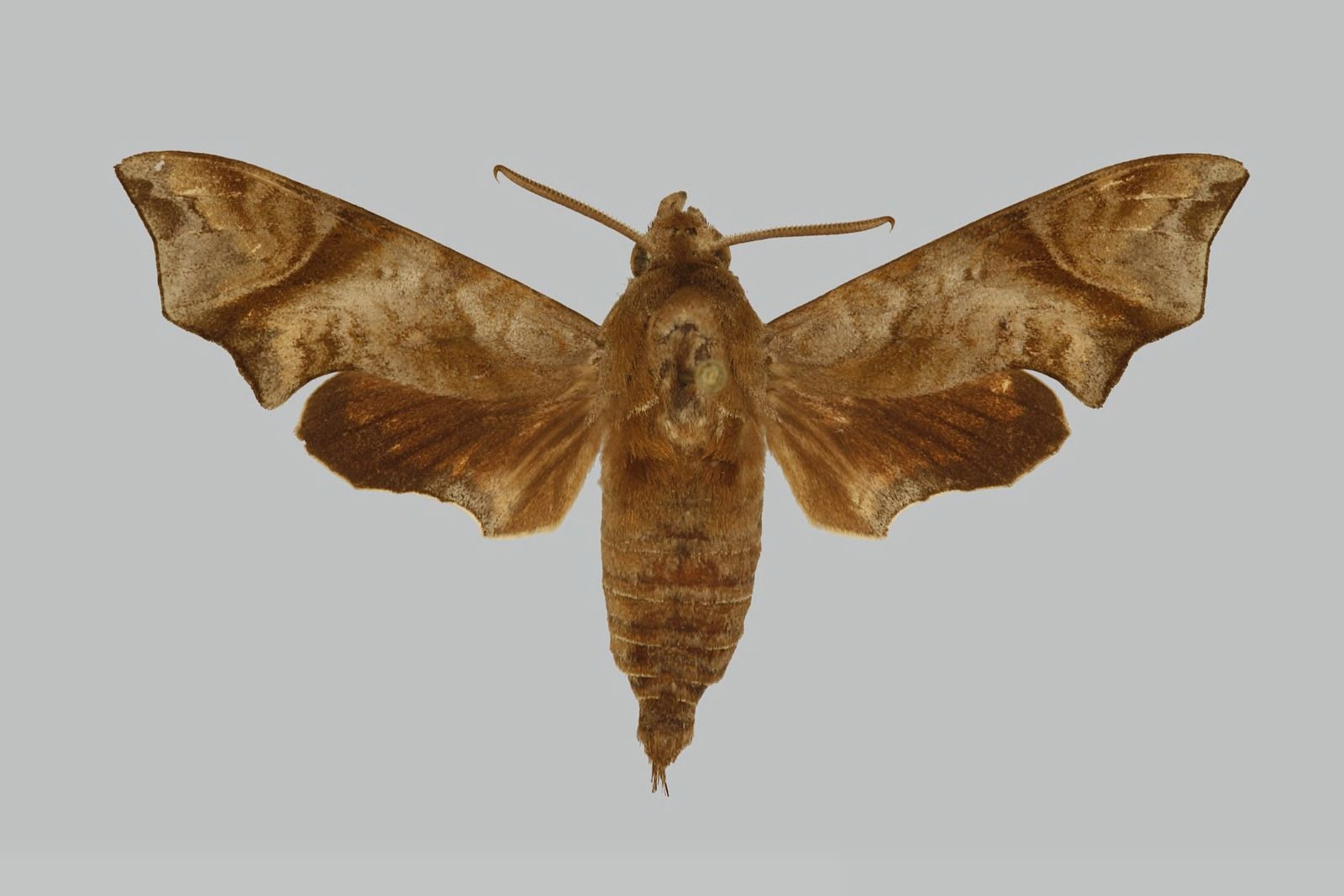

Scientific classification
- Kingdom: Animalia
- Phylum: Arthropoda
- Class: Insecta
- Order: Lepidoptera
- Family: Sphingidae
- Genus: Temnora
- Species: T. ntombi

Binomial name
- Temnora ntombi Darge, 1975

= Temnora ntombi =

Species of moth

Temnora ntombi is a moth of the family Sphingidae. It is found from Ivory Coast to Cameroon, the Republic of the Congo and Gabon.

== Subspecies ==
- Temnora ntombi ntombi
- Temnora ntombi herlanti Haxaire, 1993 (Ivory Coast)
