= Amata interniplaga =

Scientific classification
- Domain: Eukaryota
- Kingdom: Animalia
- Phylum: Arthropoda
- Class: Insecta
- Order: Lepidoptera
- Superfamily: Noctuoidea
- Family: Erebidae
- Subfamily: Arctiinae
- Genus: Amata
- Species: A. interniplaga

Binomial name
- Amata interniplaga (Mabille, 1890)

Synonyms
- Syntomis interniplaga Mabille, 1890

Species of moth

Amata interniplaga is a moth of the family Erebidae. It was described by Paul Mabille in 1890. It is found in the Republic of the Congo, the Democratic Republic of the Congo, Gabon and Nigeria.
