= Cyana rubristriga =

Scientific classification
- Kingdom: Animalia
- Phylum: Arthropoda
- Class: Insecta
- Order: Lepidoptera
- Superfamily: Noctuoidea
- Family: Erebidae
- Subfamily: Arctiinae
- Genus: Cyana
- Species: C. rubristriga

Binomial name
- Cyana rubristriga (Holland, 1893)

Synonyms
- Bizone rubristriga Holland, 1893

Species of moth

Cyana rubristriga is a moth of the family Erebidae. It was described by William Jacob Holland in 1893. It is found in the Central African Republic, the Democratic Republic of the Congo and Gabon.

== Subspecies ==
- Cyana rubristriga rubristriga
- Cyana rubristriga katanga Karisch & Dall'Asta, 2010 (Democratic Republic of the Congo)
