= Balacra pulchra =

Scientific classification
- Kingdom: Animalia
- Phylum: Arthropoda
- Clade: Pancrustacea
- Class: Insecta
- Order: Lepidoptera
- Superfamily: Noctuoidea
- Family: Erebidae
- Subfamily: Arctiinae
- Genus: Balacra
- Species: B. pulchra

Binomial name
- Balacra pulchra Aurivillius, 1892

Synonyms
- Balacra glagoessa Holland, 1893

Species of moth

Balacra pulchra is a moth of the family Erebidae. It was described by Per Olof Christopher Aurivillius in 1892 and is found in Angola, Cameroon, Chad, the Republic of the Congo, the Democratic Republic of the Congo, Equatorial Guinea, Gabon, Ivory Coast, Kenya, Nigeria, Uganda and Zambia.
