= Afrasura obliterata =

Scientific classification
- Kingdom: Animalia
- Phylum: Arthropoda
- Class: Insecta
- Order: Lepidoptera
- Superfamily: Noctuoidea
- Family: Erebidae
- Subfamily: Arctiinae
- Genus: Afrasura
- Species: A. obliterata

Binomial name
- Afrasura obliterata (Walker, [1865])

Synonyms
- Nudaria obliterata Walker, [1865]; Asura obliterata; Barsine gabunica Holland, 1893

Species of moth

Afrasura obliterata is a moth of the subfamily Arctiinae. It is found in Angola, Cameroon, Chad, the Republic of Congo, the Democratic Republic of Congo, Gabon, Ghana, Kenya, Nigeria, Sierra Leone, South Africa, Togo and Uganda.
