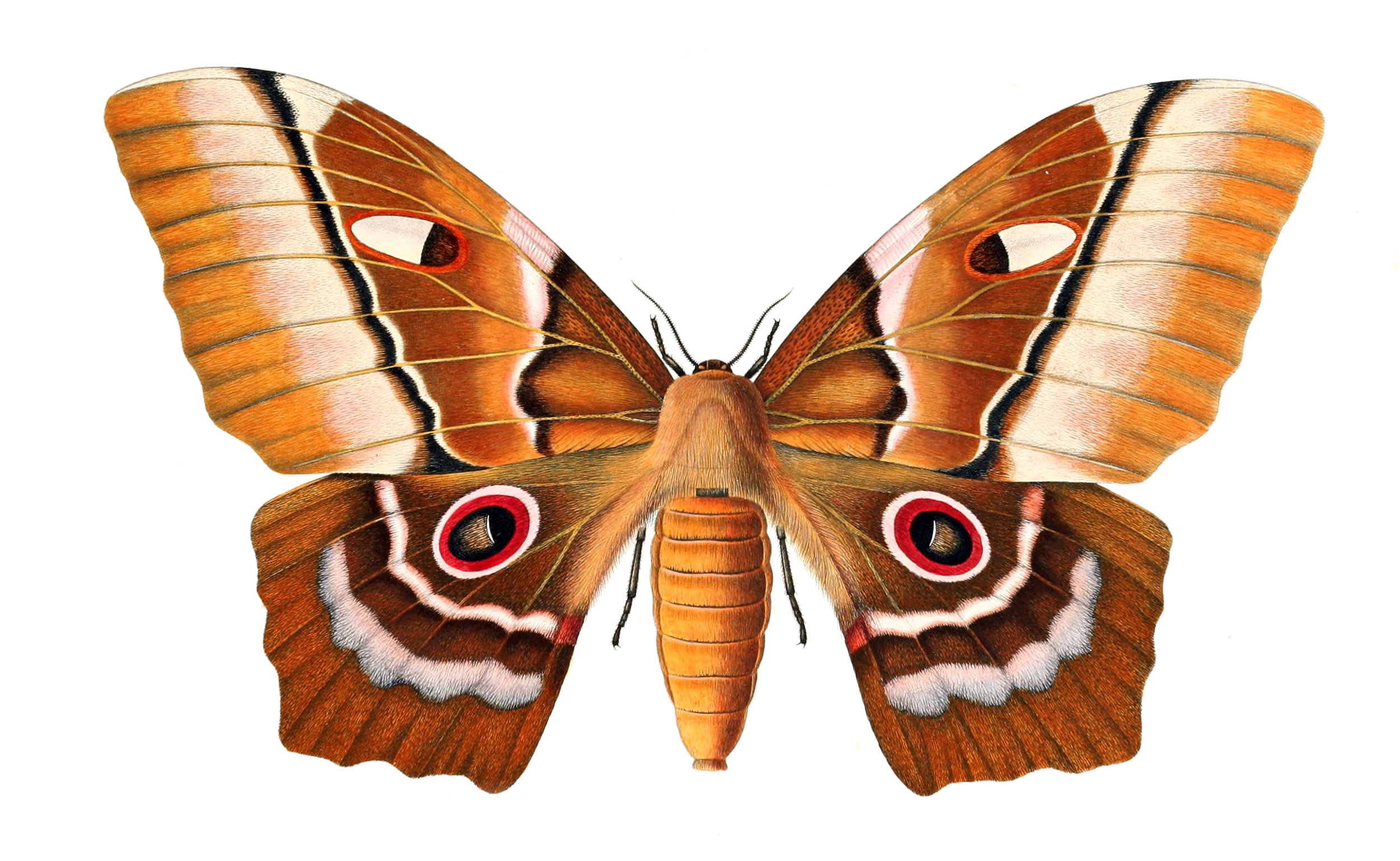
- Male

Scientific classification
- Kingdom: Animalia
- Phylum: Arthropoda
- Class: Insecta
- Order: Lepidoptera
- Family: Saturniidae
- Tribe: Bunaeini
- Genus: Pseudimbrasia; Rougeot, 1962
- Species: P. deyrollei

Binomial name
- Pseudimbrasia deyrollei (J. Thomson, 1858)

Synonyms
- Saturni deyrollei J. Thomson, 1858

= Pseudimbrasia =

Genus of moths

Pseudimbrasia is a monotypic moth genus in the family Saturniidae described by Pierre Claude Rougeot in 1962. Its only species, Pseudimbrasia deyrollei, described by James Thomson in 1858, is found in the mid-latitudes of Africa.
