= Pterophorus candidalis =

Scientific classification
- Kingdom: Animalia
- Phylum: Arthropoda
- Class: Insecta
- Order: Lepidoptera
- Family: Pterophoridae
- Genus: Pterophorus
- Species: P. candidalis

Binomial name
- Pterophorus candidalis (Walker, 1864)

Synonyms
- Aciptilia candidalis; Aciptilus candidalis Walker, 1864

Species of plume moth

Pterophorus candidalis is a moth of the family Pterophoridae. It is known from Taiwan, India, Sri Lanka, the New Hebrides, New Caledonia, Samoa, Tonga and most of Africa.

The wingspan is 15–28 mm.
