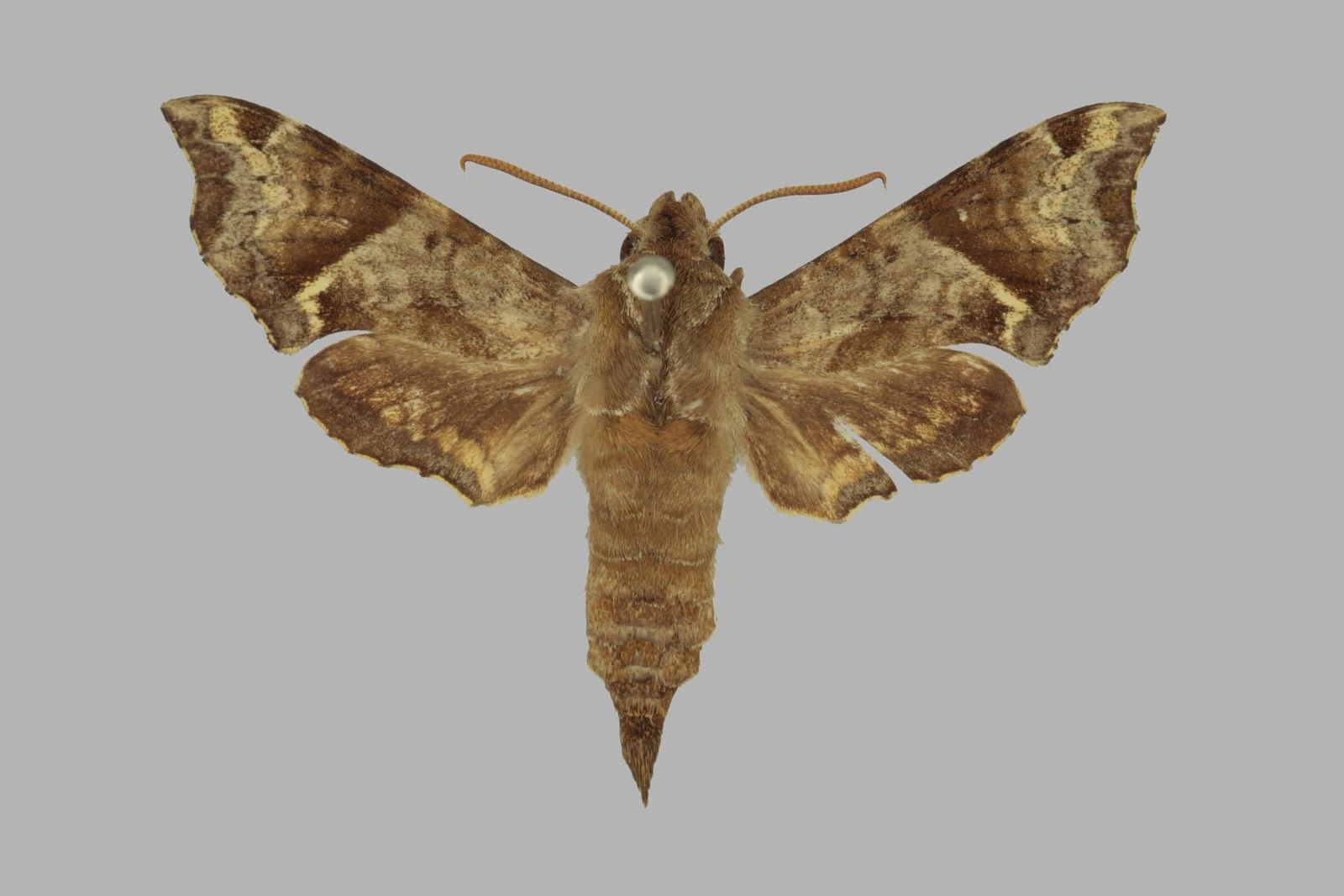

Scientific classification
- Kingdom: Animalia
- Phylum: Arthropoda
- Class: Insecta
- Order: Lepidoptera
- Family: Sphingidae
- Genus: Temnora
- Species: T. eranga

Binomial name
- Temnora eranga (Holland, 1889)

Synonyms
- Ocyton eranga Holland, 1889; Temnora heringi Gehlen, 1931

= Temnora eranga =

Species of moth

Temnora eranga is a moth of the family Sphingidae. It is known from forests from Sierra Leone to Congo and Uganda and western Kenya.

The length of the forewings is 16–18 mm.
