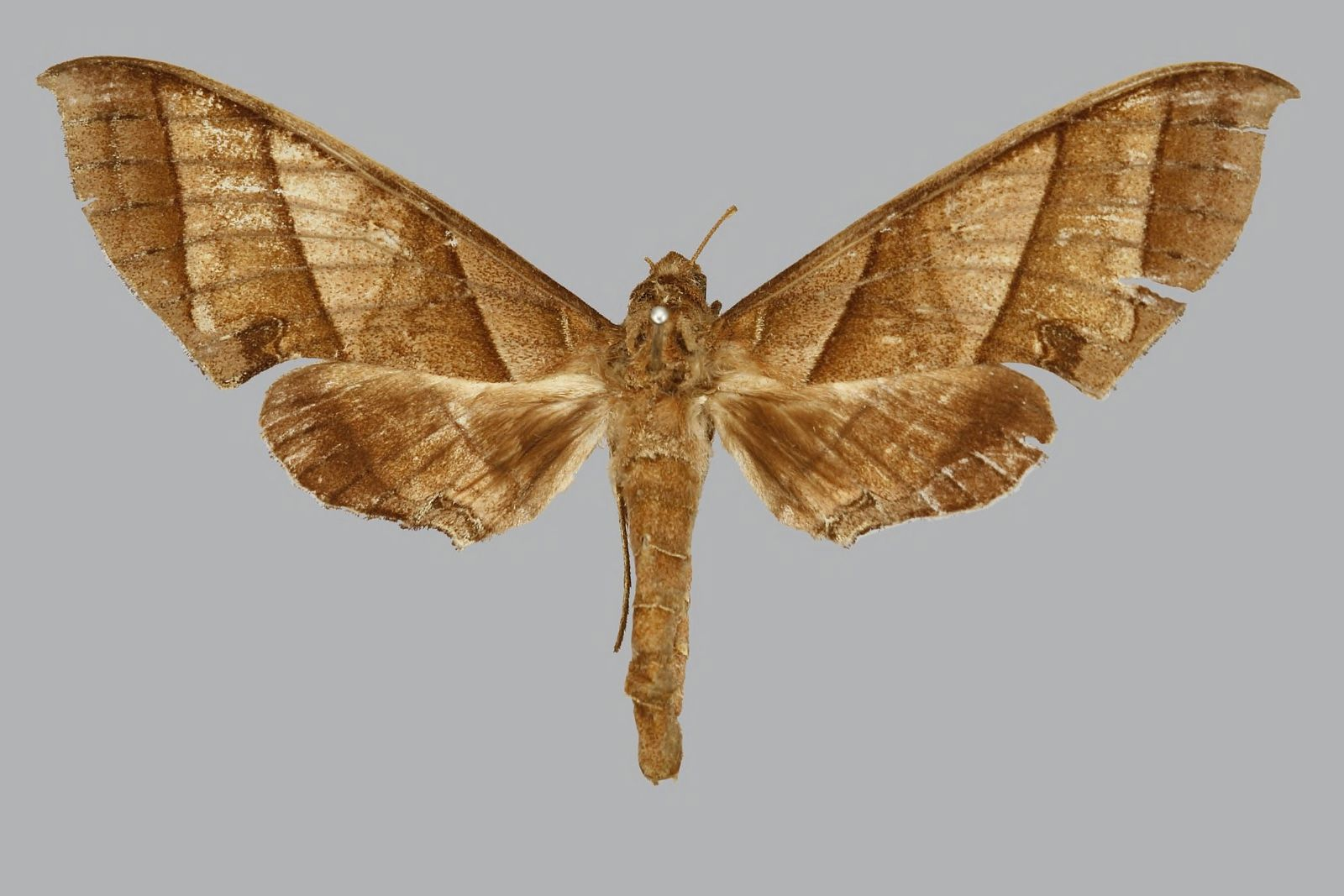

Scientific classification
- Kingdom: Animalia
- Phylum: Arthropoda
- Class: Insecta
- Order: Lepidoptera
- Family: Sphingidae
- Genus: Polyptychus
- Species: P. orthographus

Binomial name
- Polyptychus orthographus Rothschild & Jordan, 1903

= Polyptychus orthographus =

Species of moth

Polyptychus orthographus is a moth of the family Sphingidae. It is known from lowland forests from Sierra Leone to the Congo, Angola and Uganda.

The length of the forewings is 33–36 mm. It is very similar to Polyptychus trisectus but smaller, much paler (more ochreous) and the apex of the forewing is acute, but not produced.
