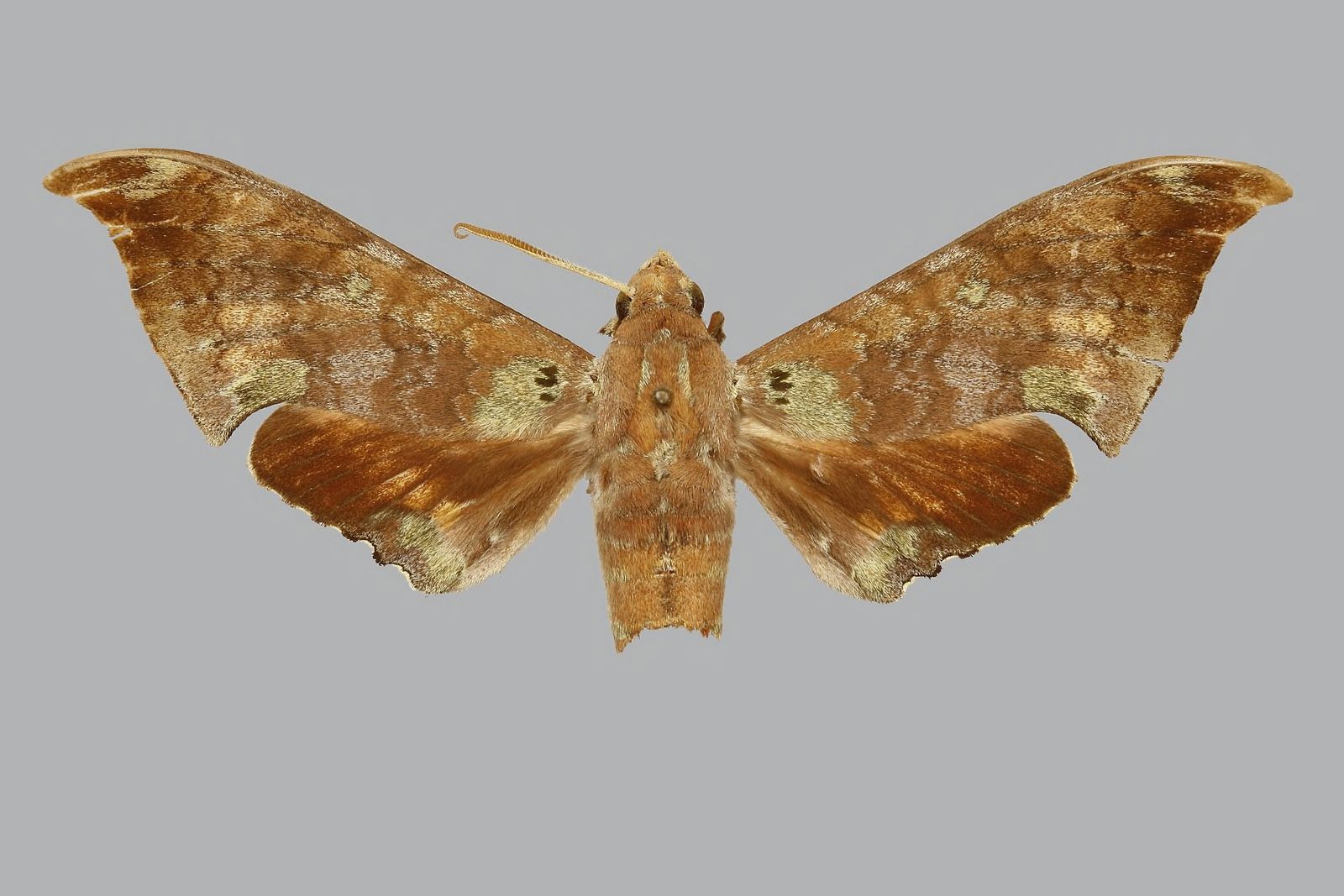
- Incomplete male specimen

Scientific classification
- Kingdom: Animalia
- Phylum: Arthropoda
- Class: Insecta
- Order: Lepidoptera
- Family: Sphingidae
- Genus: Polyptychus
- Species: P. enodia

Binomial name
- Polyptychus enodia (Holland, 1889)

Synonyms
- Basiana enodia Holland, 1889; Polyptychus enodius

= Polyptychus enodia =

Species of moth

Polyptychus enodia is a moth of the family Sphingidae. It is present in Gabon and West Congo.
