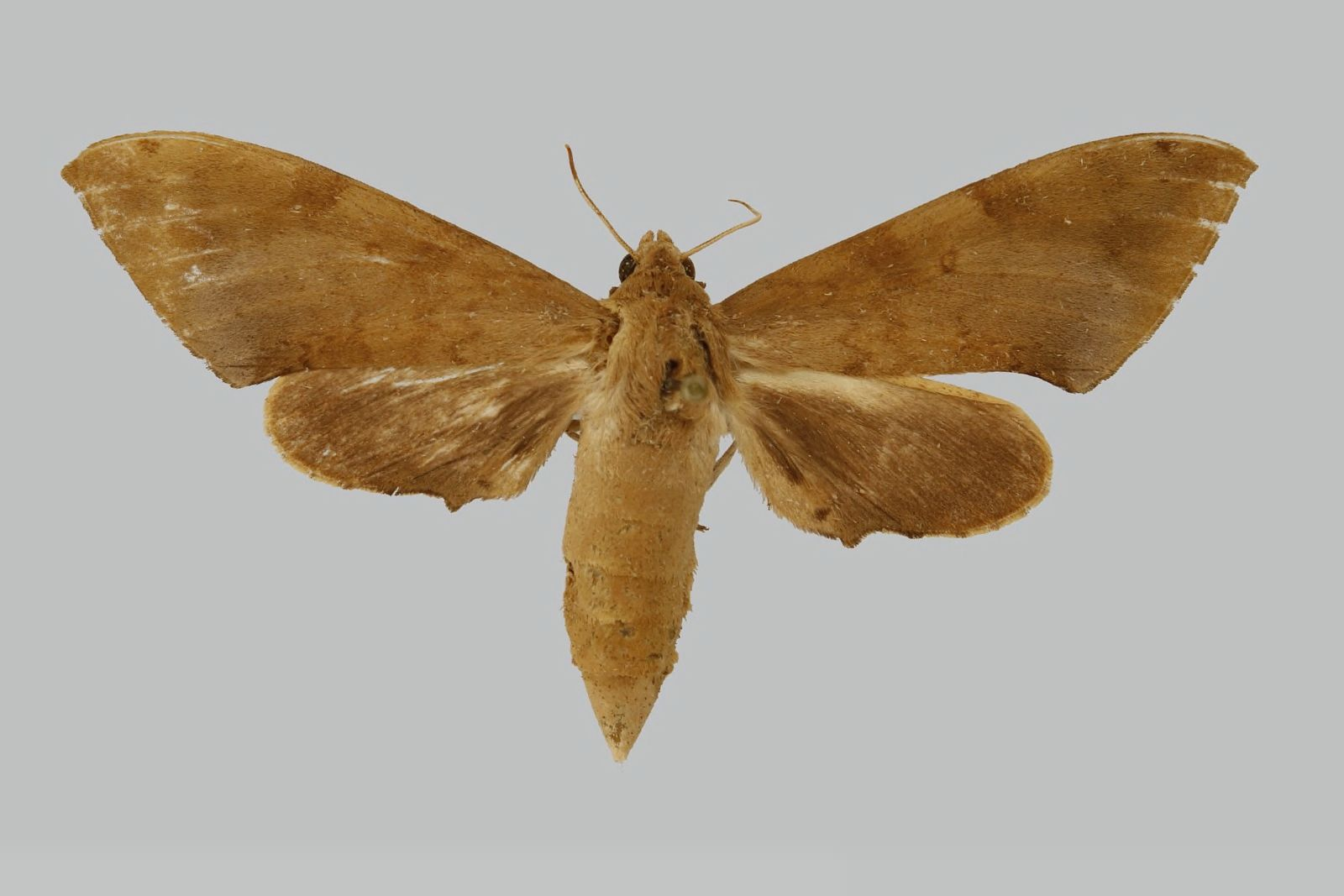

Scientific classification
- Domain: Eukaryota
- Kingdom: Animalia
- Phylum: Arthropoda
- Class: Insecta
- Order: Lepidoptera
- Family: Sphingidae
- Genus: Polyptychus
- Species: P. girardi

Binomial name
- Polyptychus girardi Pierre, 1993

= Polyptychus girardi =

Species of moth

Polyptychus girardi is a moth of the family Sphingidae. It is found from Guinea east to Cameroon.
