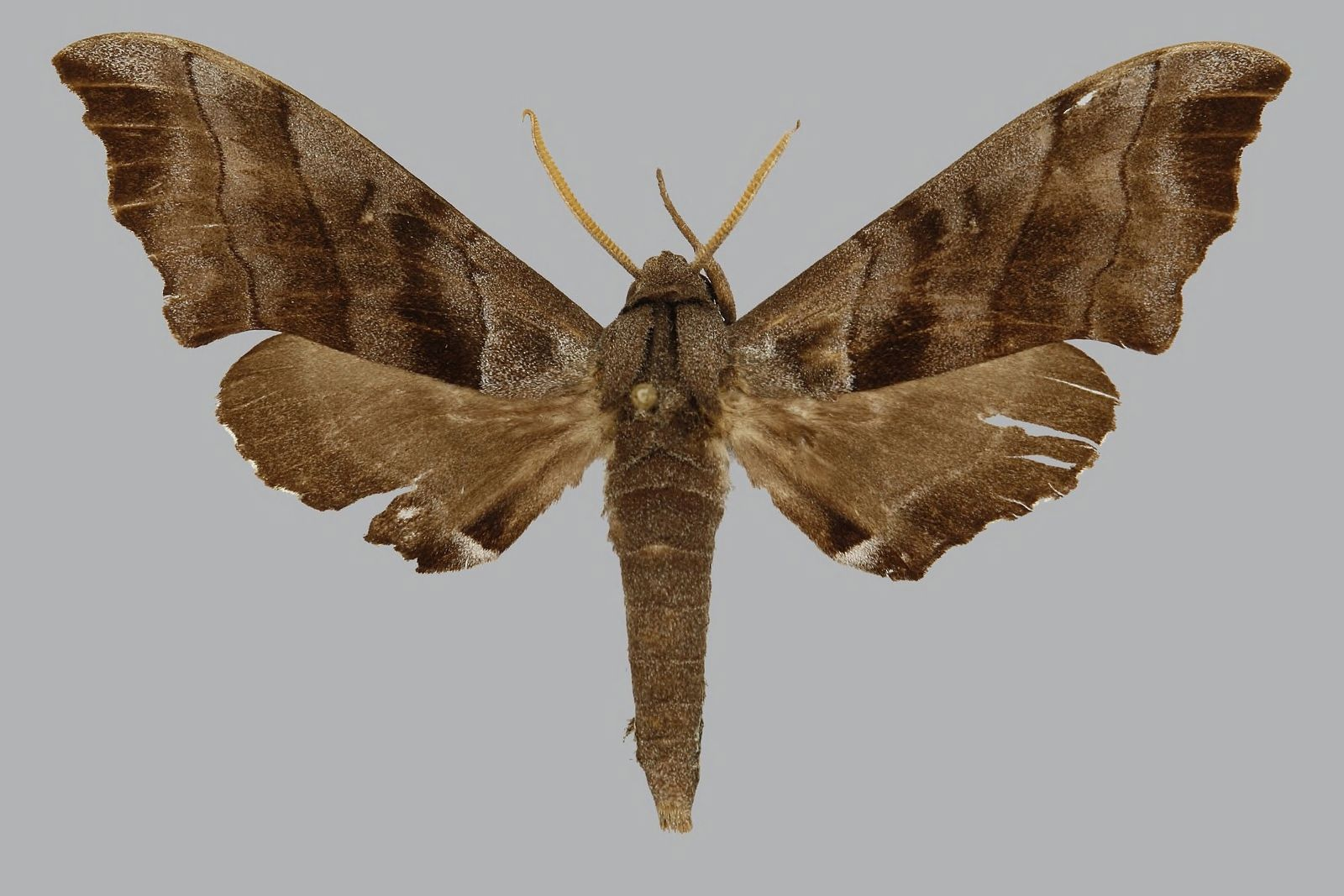

Scientific classification
- Kingdom: Animalia
- Phylum: Arthropoda
- Clade: Pancrustacea
- Class: Insecta
- Order: Lepidoptera
- Family: Sphingidae
- Genus: Polyptychus
- Species: P. claudiae

Binomial name
- Polyptychus claudiae Brechlin, Kitching & Cadiou, 2001

= Polyptychus claudiae =

Species of moth

Polyptychus claudiae is a moth of the family Sphingidae. It is known from Sumbawa in Indonesia.
