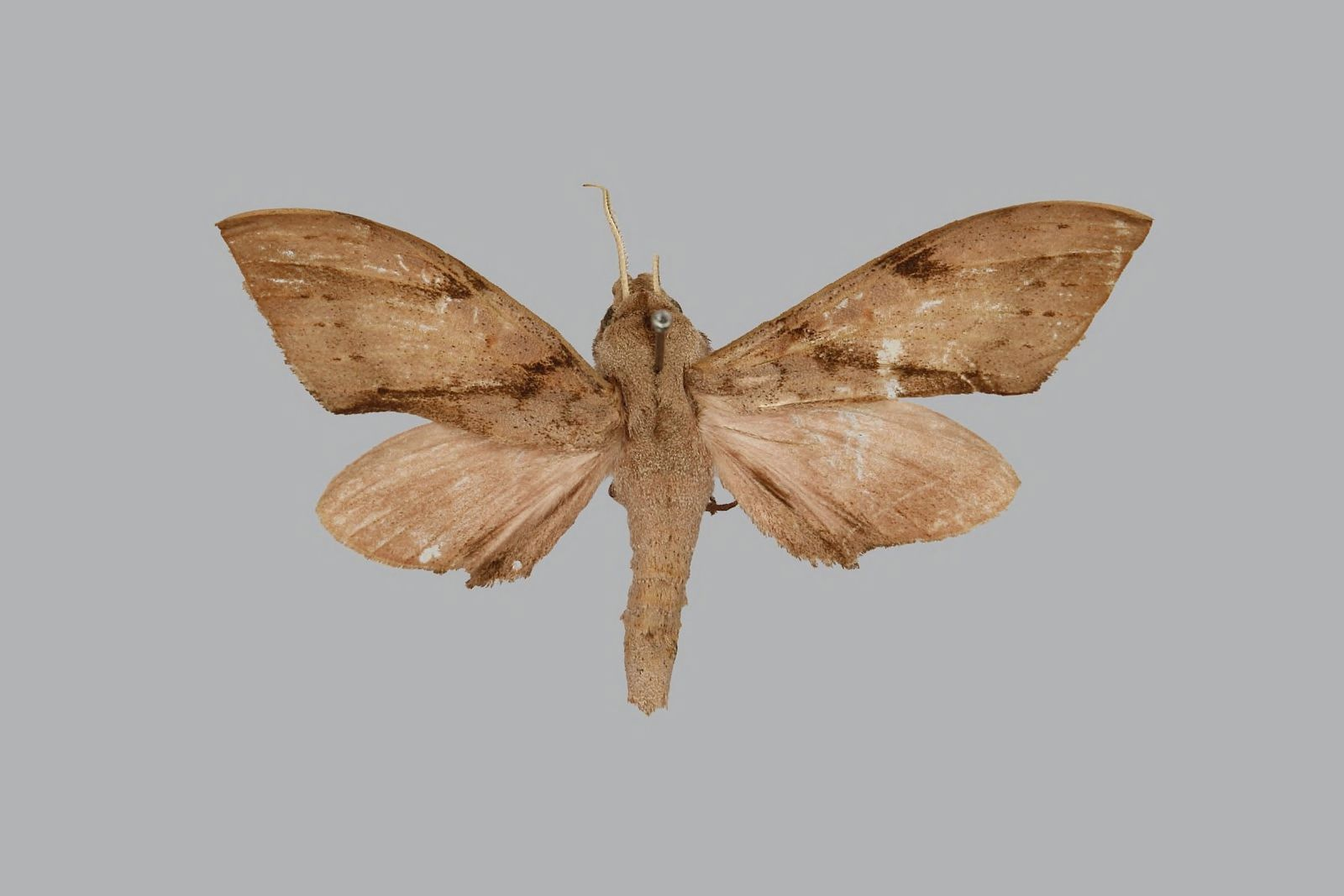

Scientific classification
- Kingdom: Animalia
- Phylum: Arthropoda
- Class: Insecta
- Order: Lepidoptera
- Family: Sphingidae
- Genus: Polyptychus
- Species: P. aurora

Binomial name
- Polyptychus aurora Clark, 1936

Synonyms
- Polyptychus ferroseus Gehlen, 1950

= Polyptychus aurora =

Species of moth

Polyptychus aurora is a moth of the family Sphingidae. It is known from the Democratic Republic of the Congo, Zambia and Malawi.
