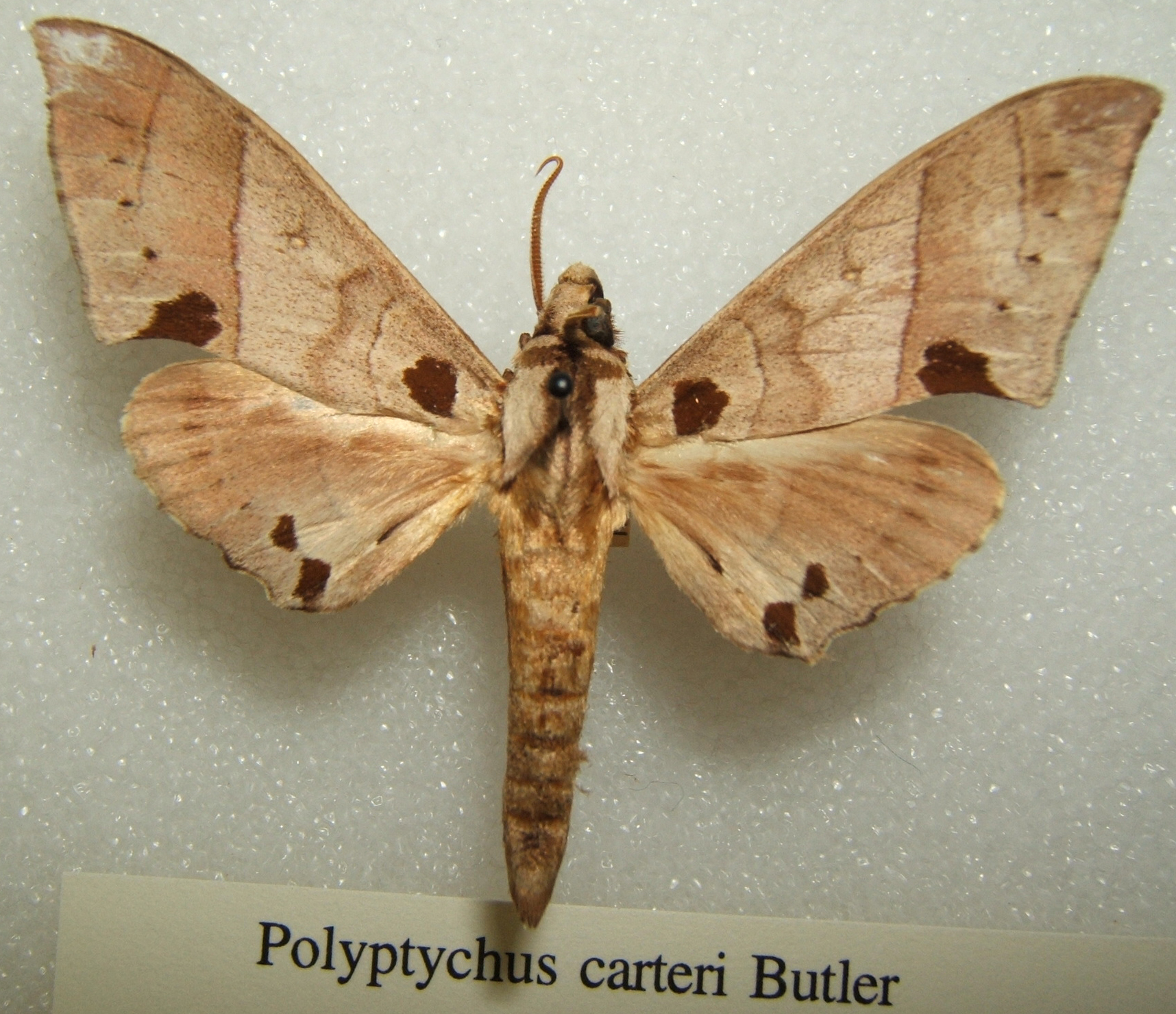
- Polyptychus carteri, adult

Scientific classification
- Domain: Eukaryota
- Kingdom: Animalia
- Phylum: Arthropoda
- Class: Insecta
- Order: Lepidoptera
- Family: Sphingidae
- Genus: Polyptychus
- Species: P. carteri

Binomial name
- Polyptychus carteri (Butler, 1852)

Synonyms
- Pseudosmerinthus carteri Butler, 1852; Polyptychus poliadles Rothschild & Jordan, 1906

= Polyptychus carteri =

Species of moth

Polyptychus carteri is a moth of the family Sphingidae. It is known from lowland forests from Sierra Leone to the Congo and Uganda.
