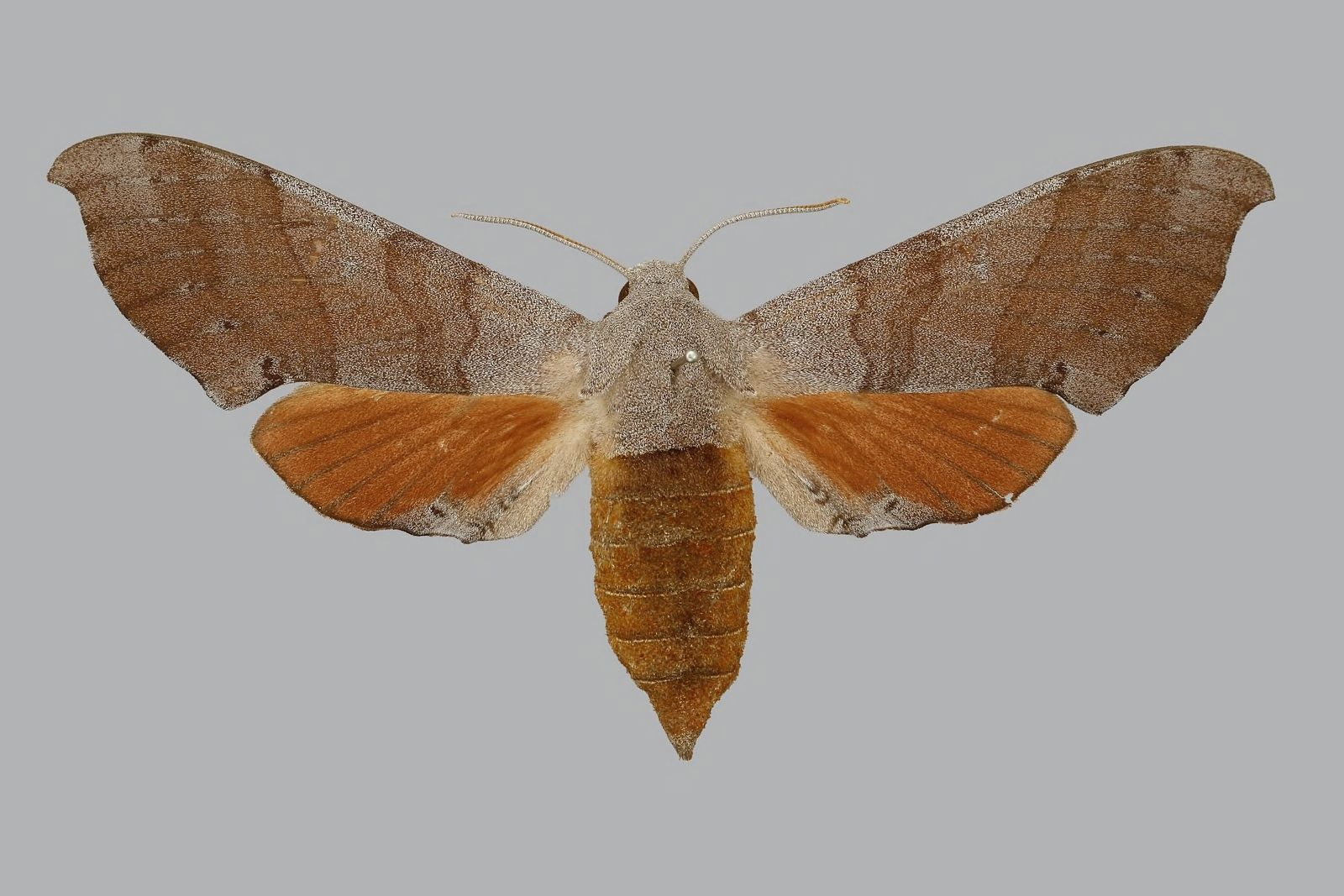

Scientific classification
- Domain: Eukaryota
- Kingdom: Animalia
- Phylum: Arthropoda
- Class: Insecta
- Order: Lepidoptera
- Family: Sphingidae
- Genus: Polyptychus
- Species: P. coryndoni

Binomial name
- Polyptychus coryndoni Rothschild & Jordan, 1903

= Polyptychus coryndoni =

Species of moth

Polyptychus coryndoni is a moth of the family Sphingidae. It is known from Brachystegia woodland from Zimbabwe to Malawi, Zambia, the Democratic Republic of the Congo and Tanzania. It has also been recorded from northern Nigeria. This species has since been caught in Burkina Faso by Prost on 1986. A light-trap capture was made in Côte d'Ivoire (1 male) and a male imago was obtained from a caterpillar found at the same site on 6/4/1980, chrysalid on 9/4, and hatched on 20/4 on the Dipterocarpaceous plant Monotes kerstingii. This specimen has since currently been studied, but further individuals are needed to confirm its identity or difference from other specimens collected from Zimbabwe.

The length of the forewings is 34–38 mm for males and 39–43 mm for females.
