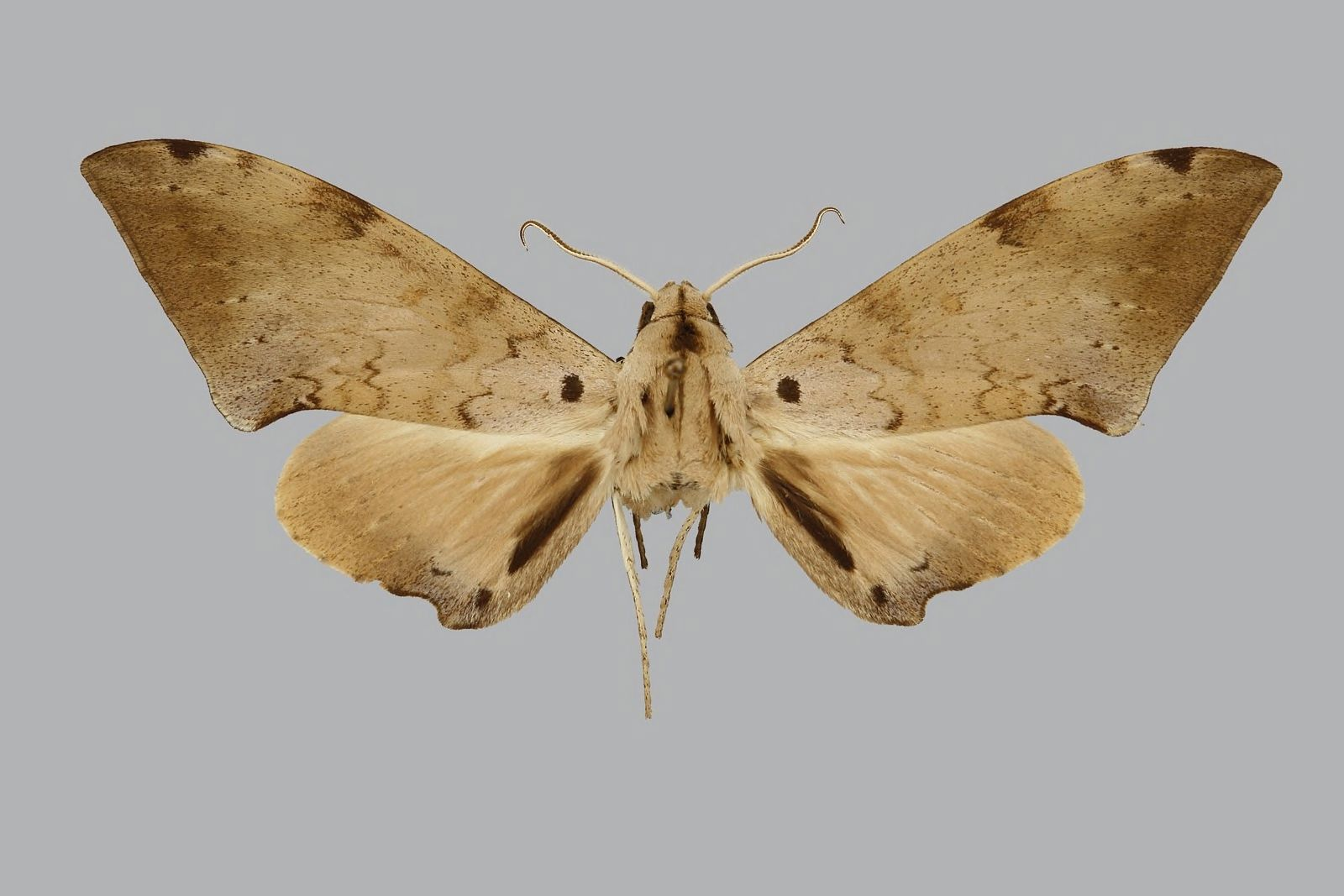
- Incomplete male specimen

Scientific classification
- Kingdom: Animalia
- Phylum: Arthropoda
- Class: Insecta
- Order: Lepidoptera
- Family: Sphingidae
- Genus: Polyptychus
- Species: P. herbuloti

Binomial name
- Polyptychus herbuloti Darge, 1990

= Polyptychus herbuloti =

Species of moth

Polyptychus herbuloti is a moth of the family Sphingidae. It is known from Cameroon, the Central African Republic, the Democratic Republic of the Congo and Gabon.

The length of the forewings is 43–45 mm (1.7–1.8 in).
