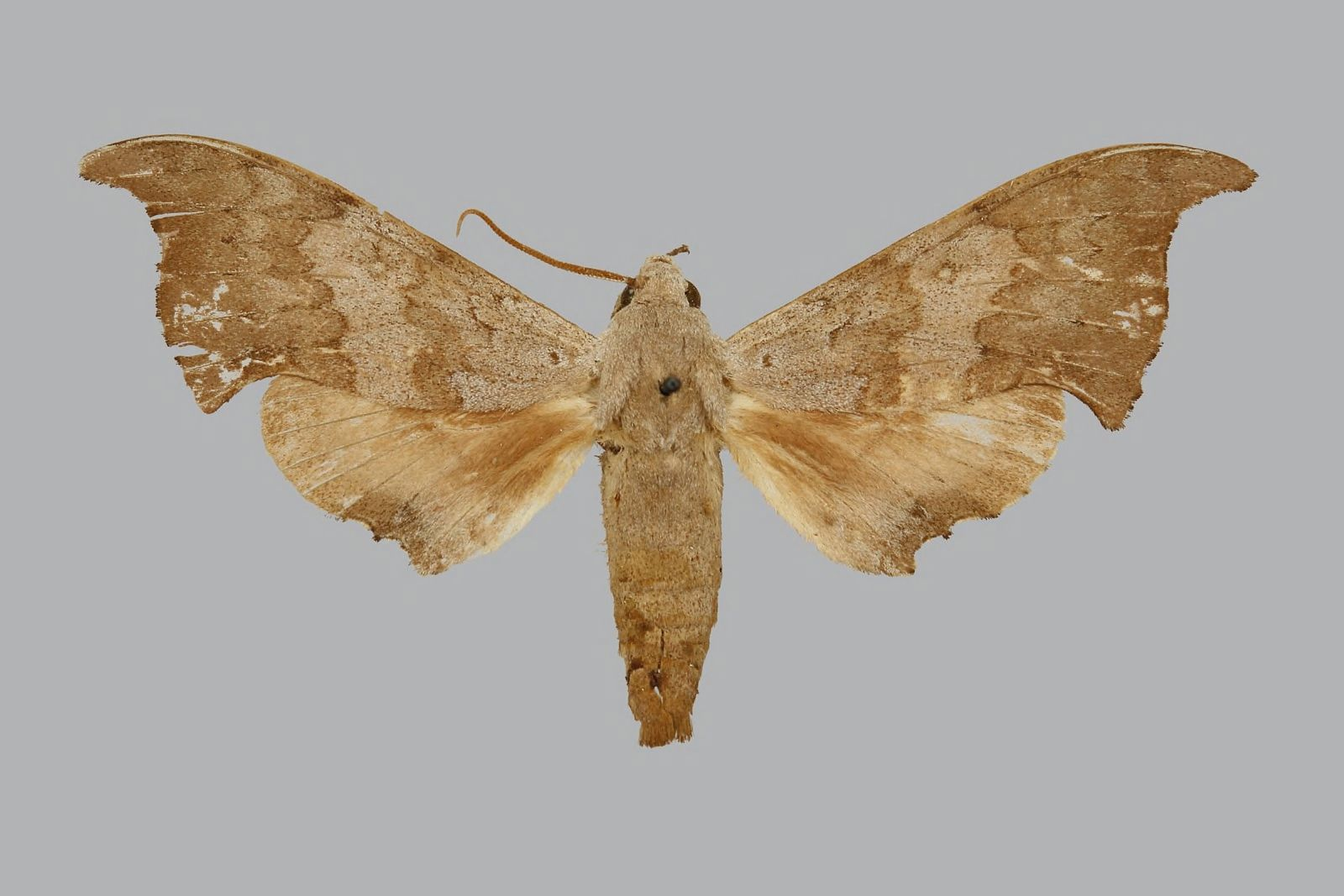
- Polyptychus anochus anochus (male)

Scientific classification
- Kingdom: Animalia
- Phylum: Arthropoda
- Class: Insecta
- Order: Lepidoptera
- Family: Sphingidae
- Genus: Polyptychus
- Species: P. anochus

Binomial name
- Polyptychus anochus Rothschild & Jordan, 1906

= Polyptychus anochus =

Species of moth

Polyptychus anochus is a moth of the family Sphingidae. It is found from Sierra Leone to Nigeria and the Congo.

The wingspan is 30–33 mm.

== Subspecies ==
- Polyptychus anochus anochus
- Polyptychus anochus margo Pierre & Basquin, 2005 (Central African Republic)
