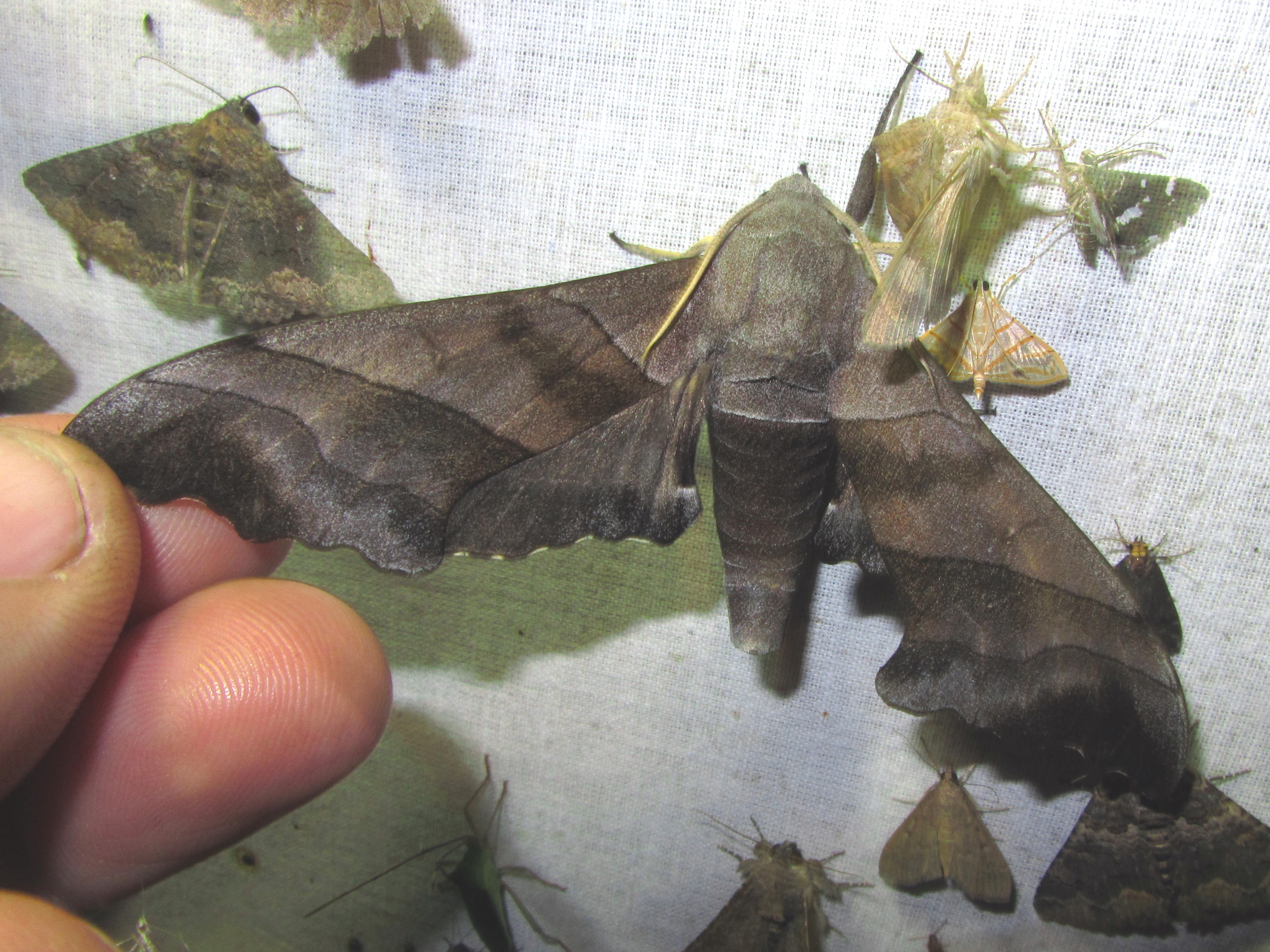

Scientific classification
- Domain: Eukaryota
- Kingdom: Animalia
- Phylum: Arthropoda
- Class: Insecta
- Order: Lepidoptera
- Family: Sphingidae
- Genus: Polyptychus
- Species: P. trilineatus

Binomial name
- Polyptychus trilineatus Moore, 1888

= Polyptychus trilineatus =

Species of moth

Polyptychus trilineatus, the common crenulate hawkmoth, is a moth of the family Sphingidae. It is known from large parts of South Asia.

== Description ==
The wingspan is 74–112 mm.

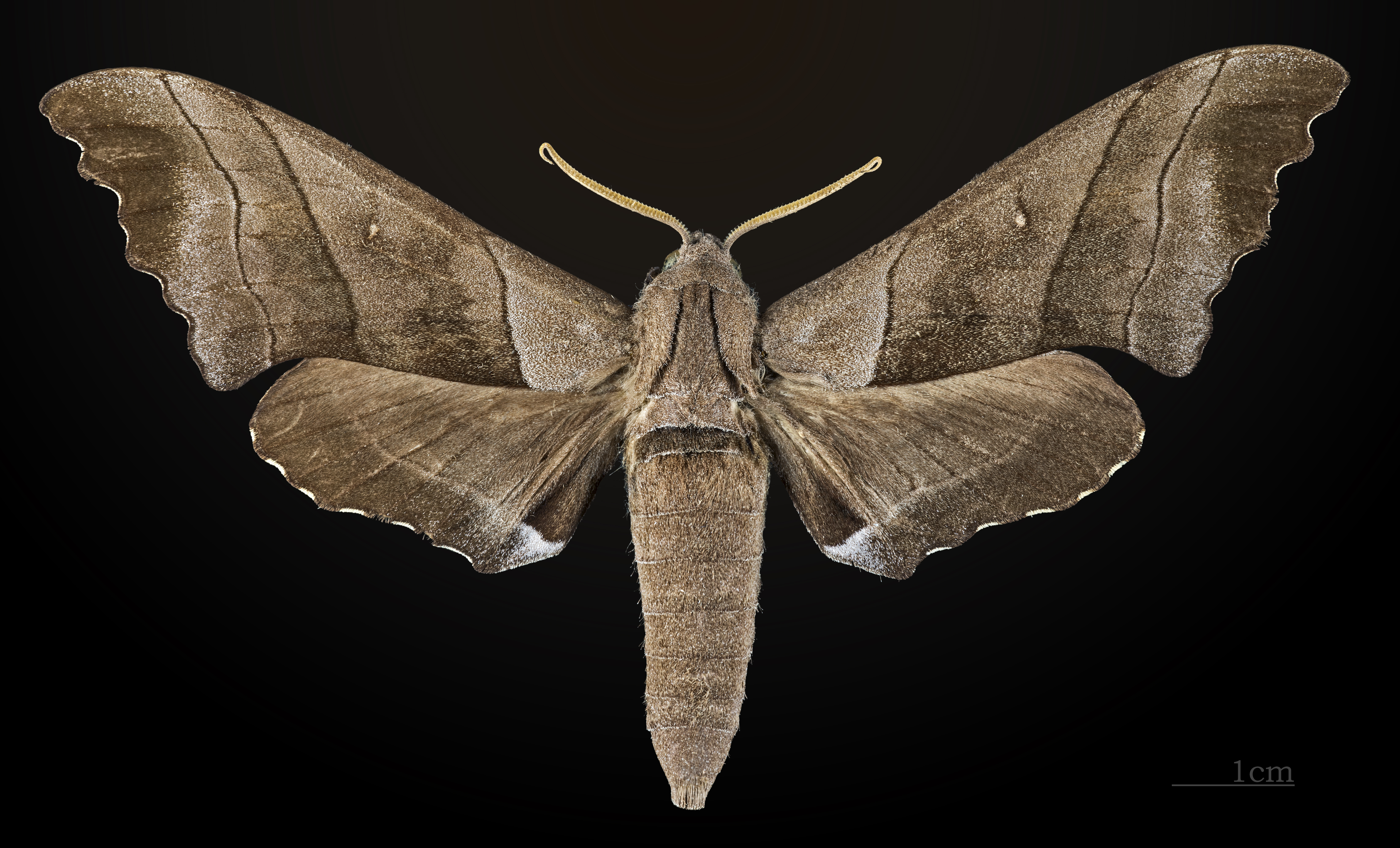
Male

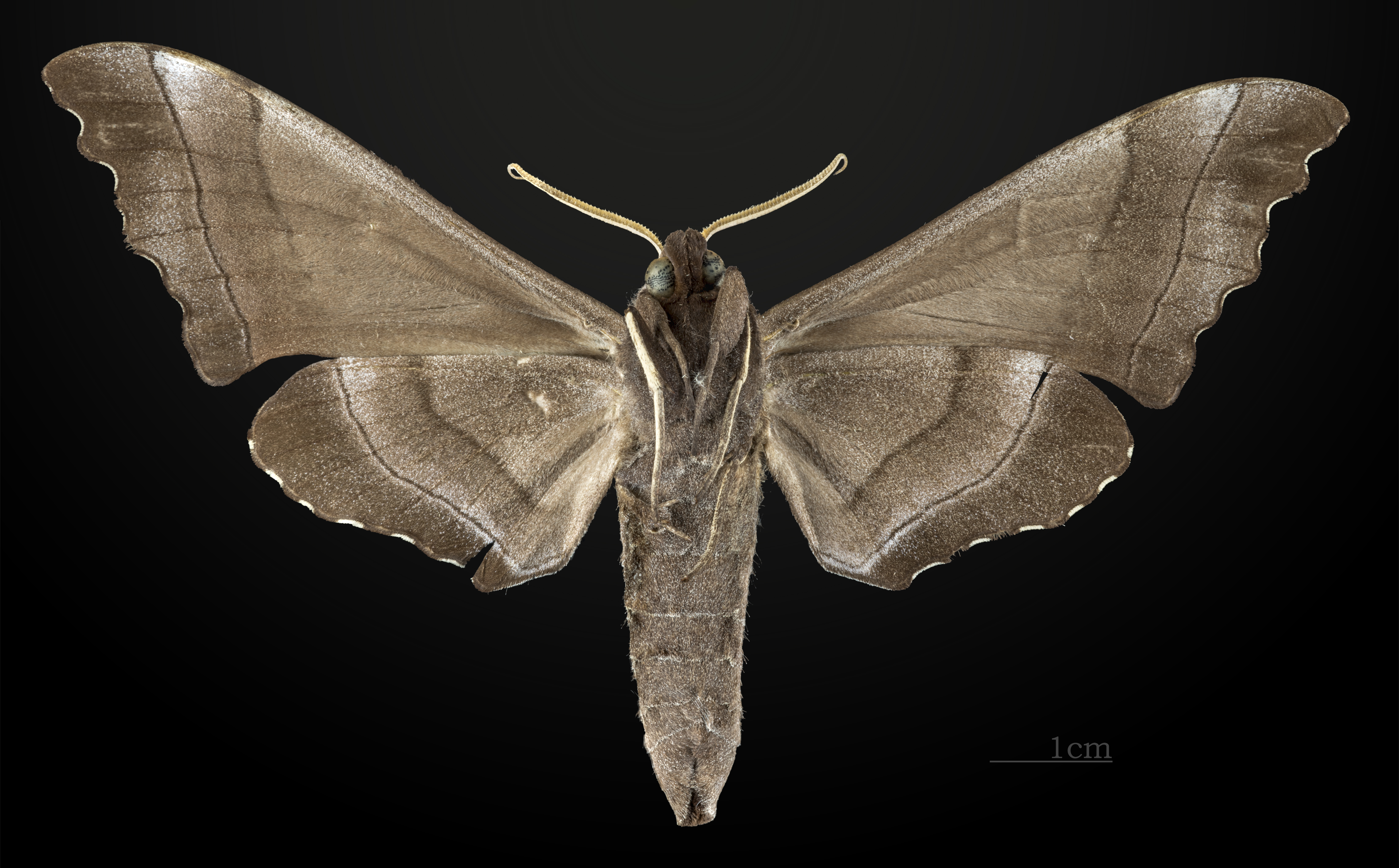
Male underside

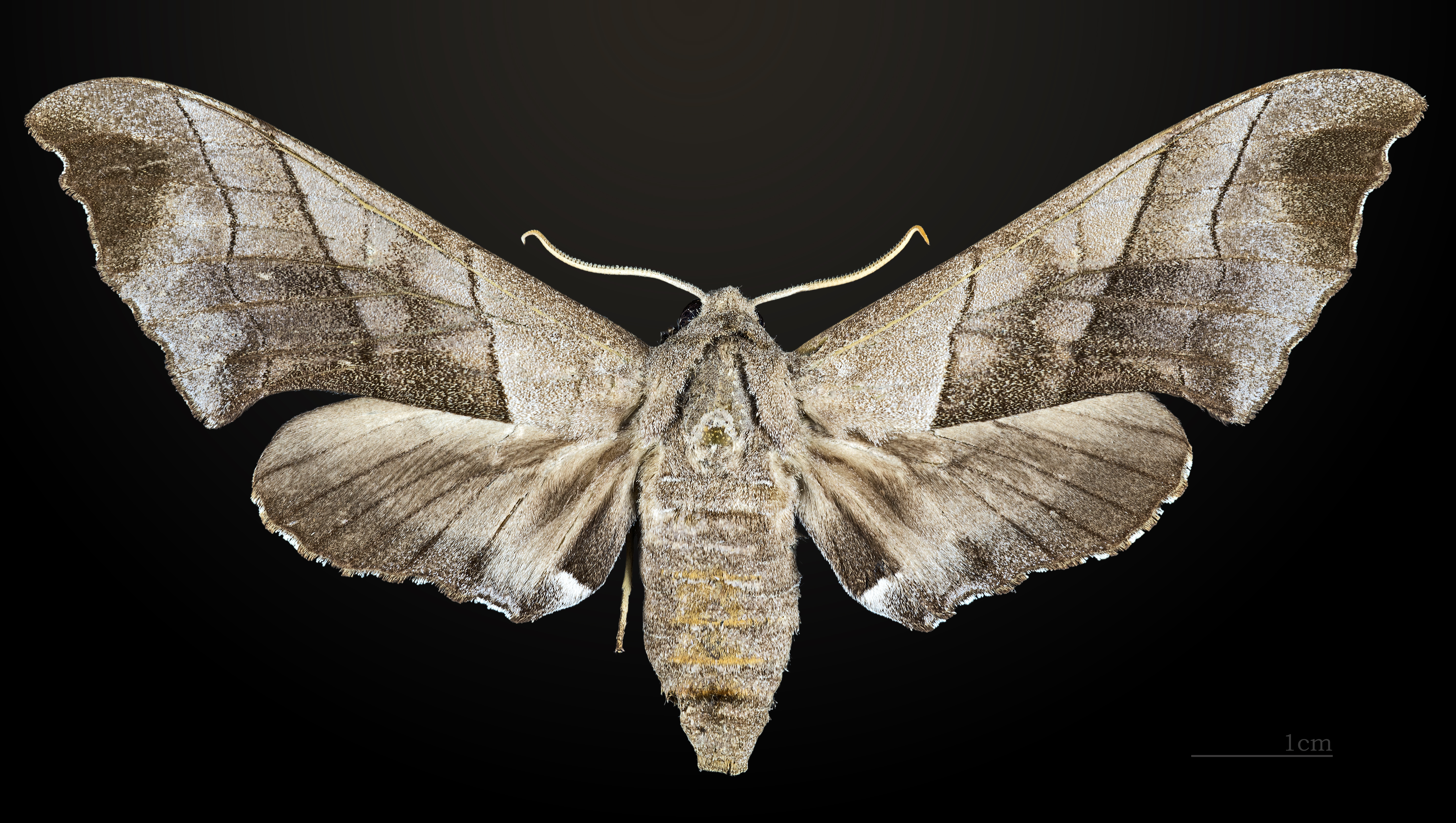
Female

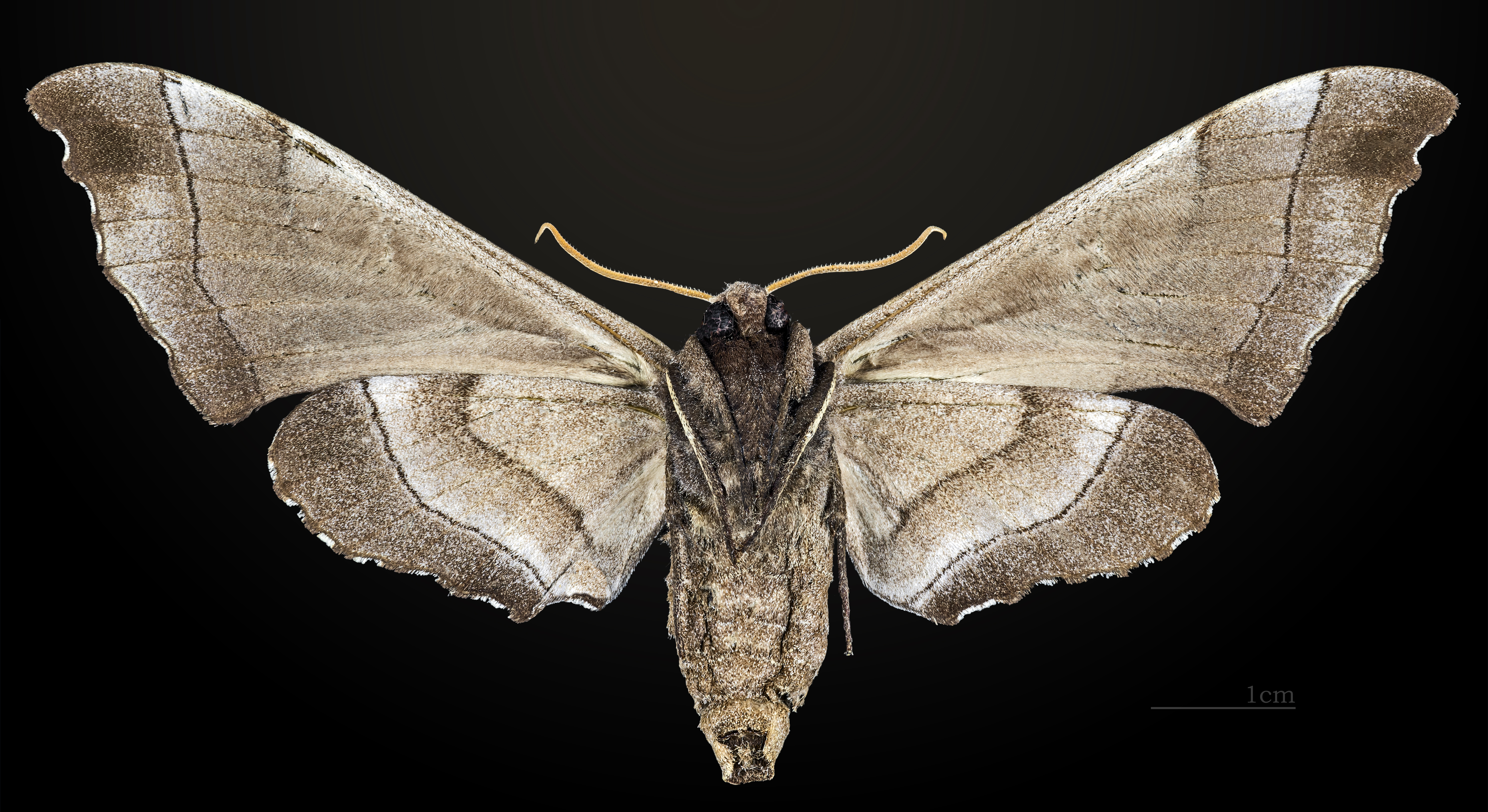
Female underside

== Biology ==
The larvae feed on Ehretia species.

== Subspecies ==
- Polyptychus trilineatus trilineatus (northern India, Nepal, Myanmar, southern China (Hainan), Thailand and Vietnam)
- Polyptychus trilineatus celebensis Clark, 1929 (Sulawesi)
- Polyptychus trilineatus costalis Mell, 1922 (southern China)
- Polyptychus trilineatus javanicus Gehlen, 1931
- Polyptychus trilineatus kelanus Jordan, 1930
- Polyptychus trilineatus luteatus Rothschild & Jordan, 1903 (southern India, Sri Lanka)
- Polyptychus trilineatus mincopicus Jordan, 1930
- Polyptychus trilineatus sonantis Jordan, 1930
- Polyptychus trilineatus philippinensis Rothschild & Jordan, 1903 (Philippines)
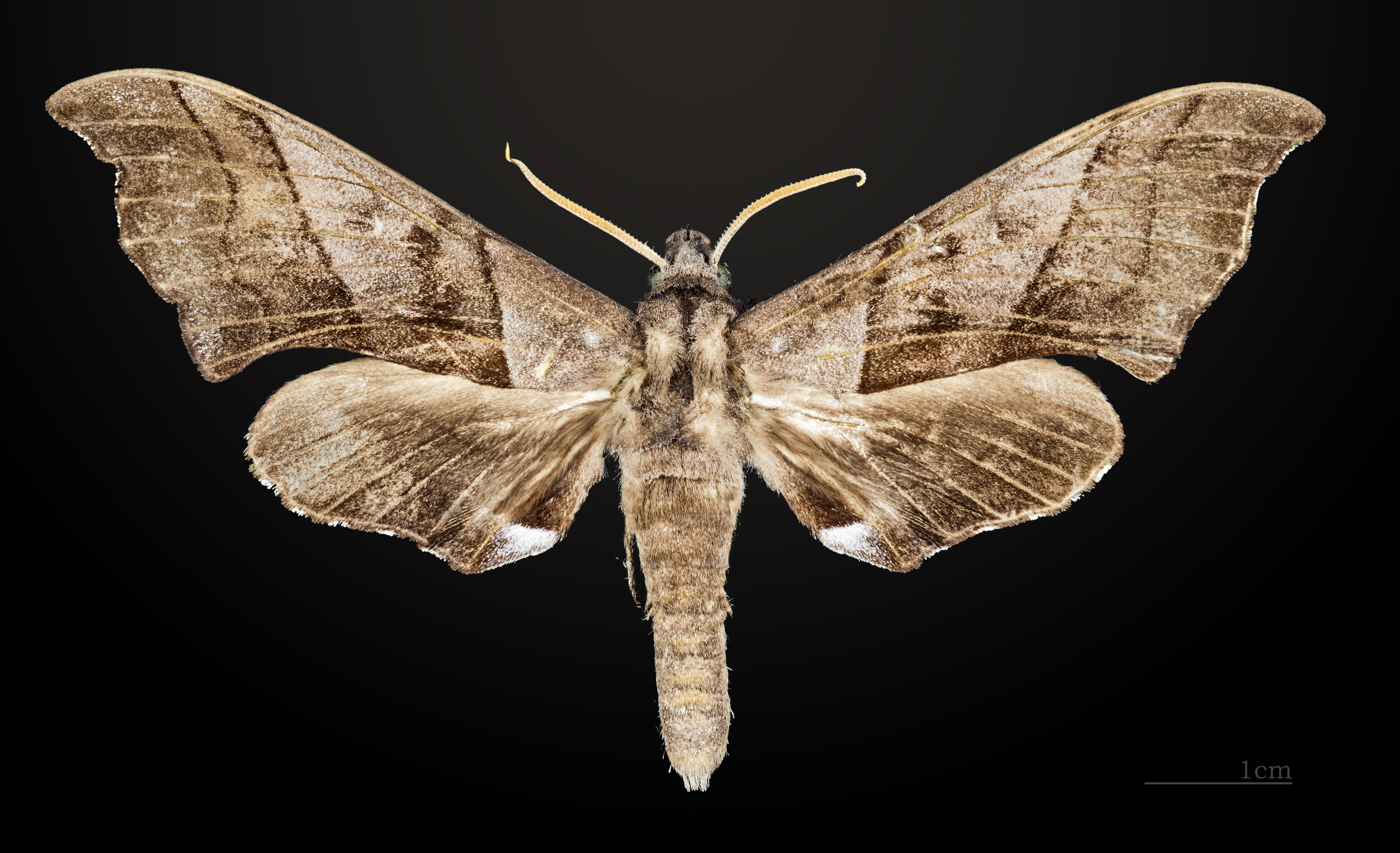
P. t. celebensis, dorsal view

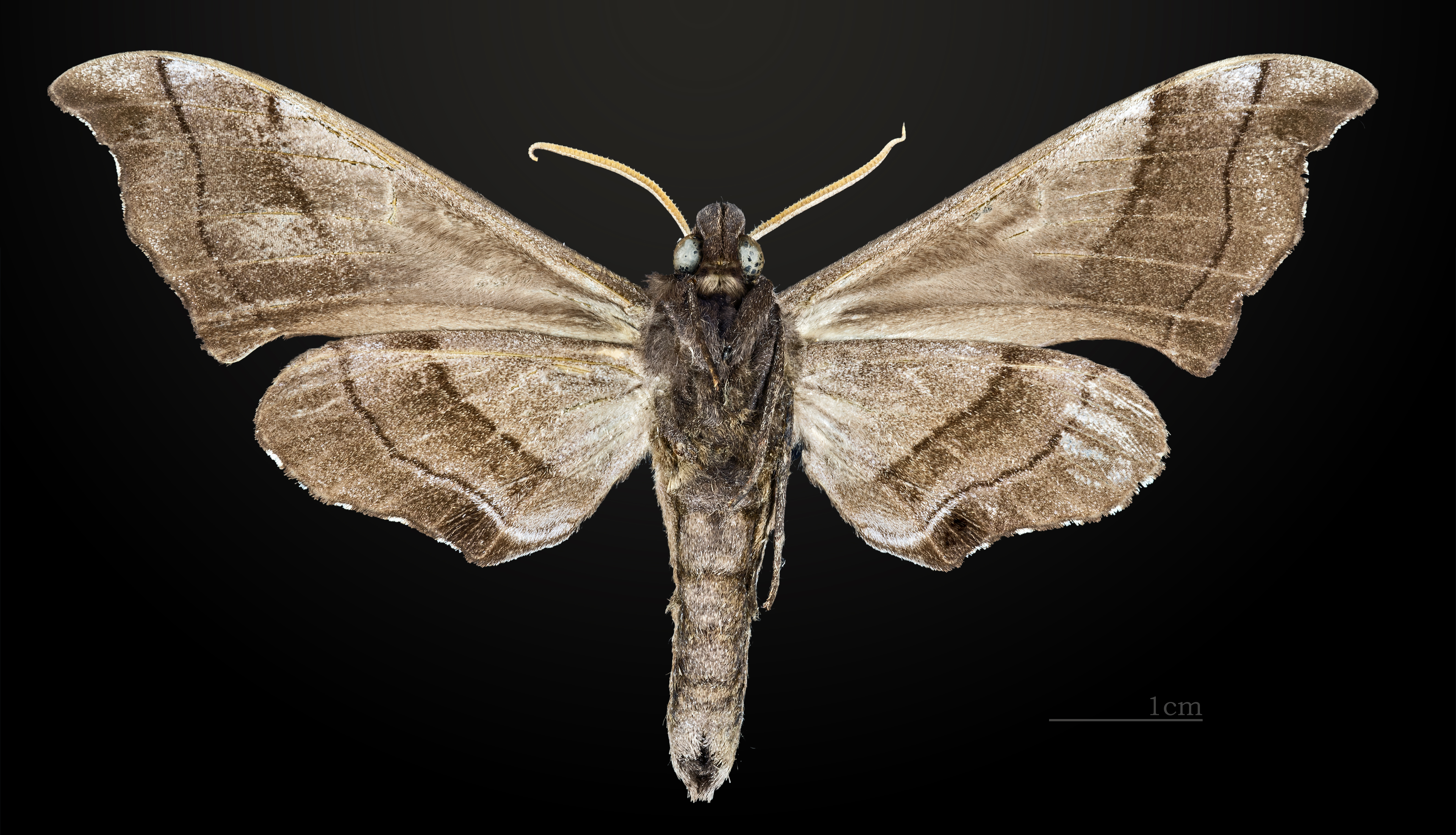
P. t. celebensis, ventral view

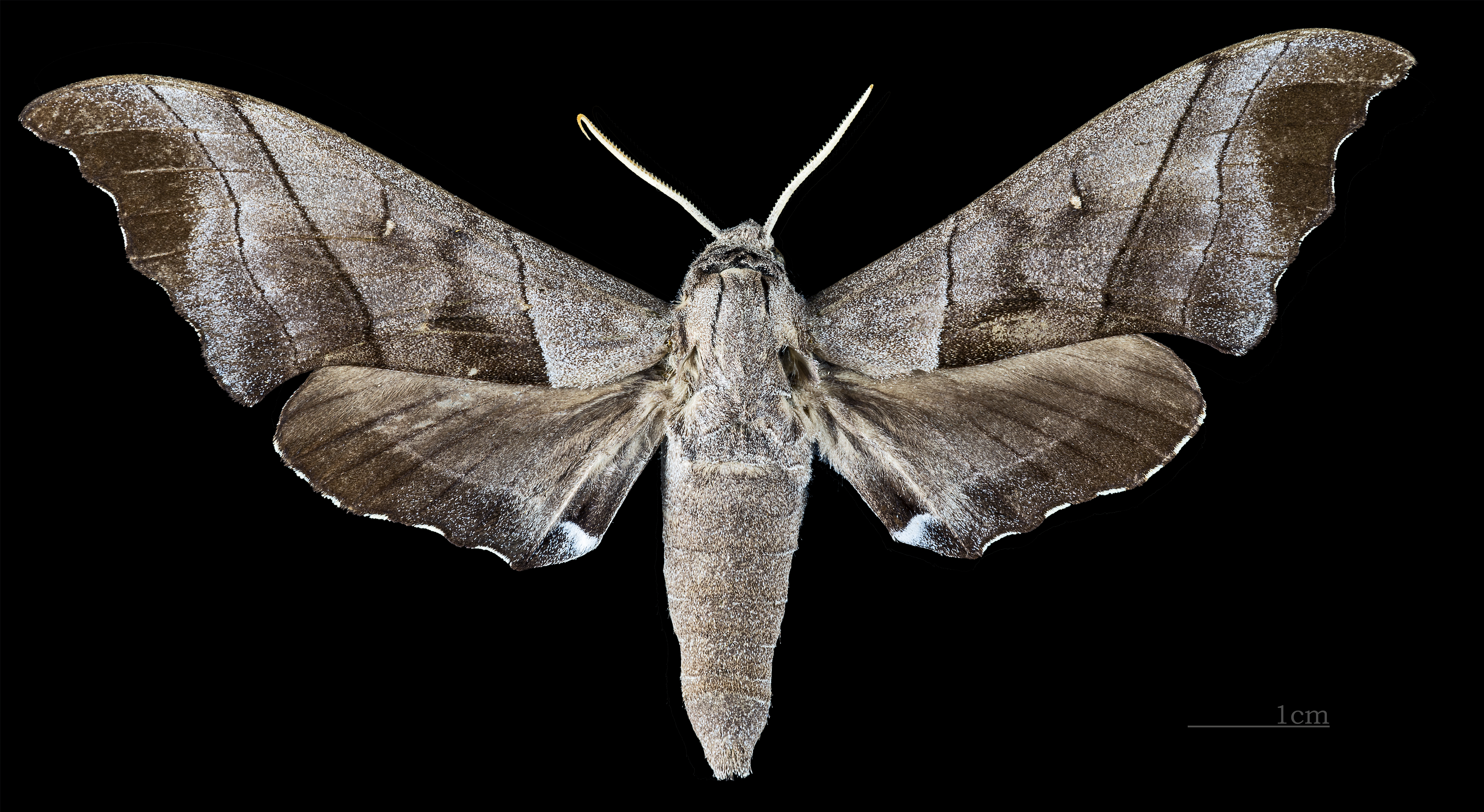
P. t. javanicus, dorsal view

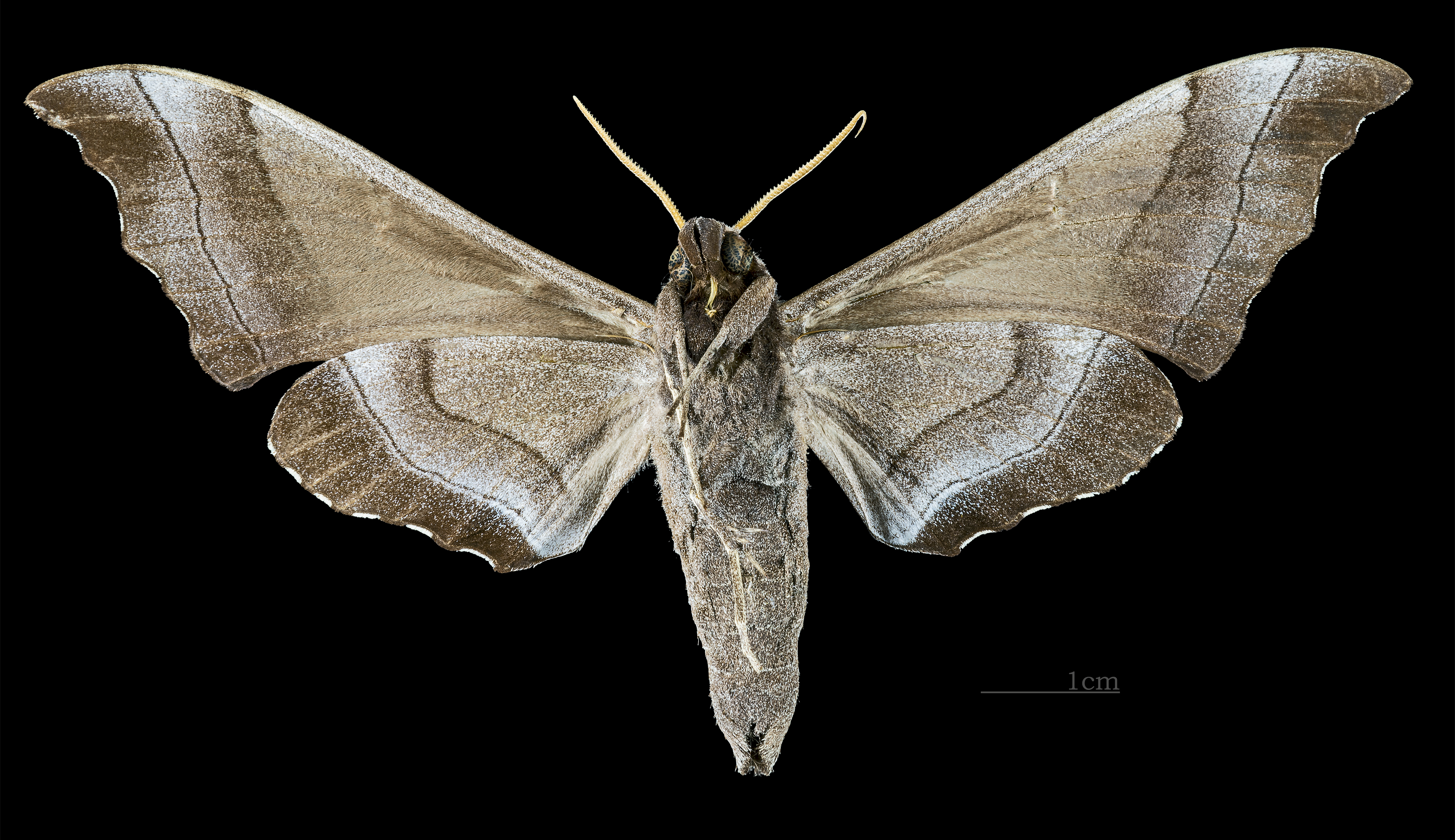
P. t. javanicus, ventral view
