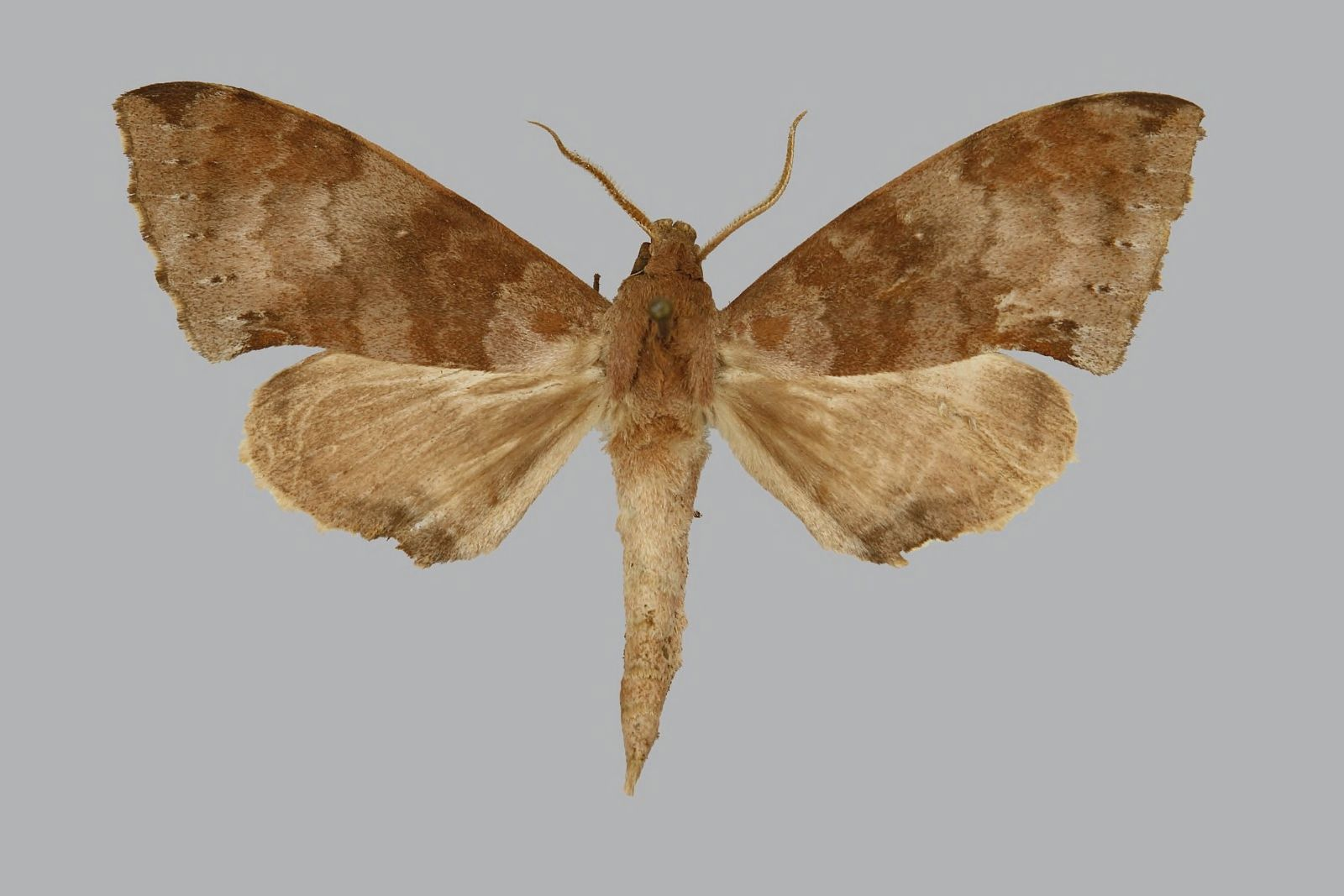

Scientific classification
- Kingdom: Animalia
- Phylum: Arthropoda
- Class: Insecta
- Order: Lepidoptera
- Family: Sphingidae
- Genus: Polyptychus
- Species: P. hollandi

Binomial name
- Polyptychus hollandi Rothschild & Jordan, 1903

= Polyptychus hollandi =

Species of moth

Polyptychus hollandi is a moth of the family Sphingidae. It is known from forests from Nigeria to the Congo .
