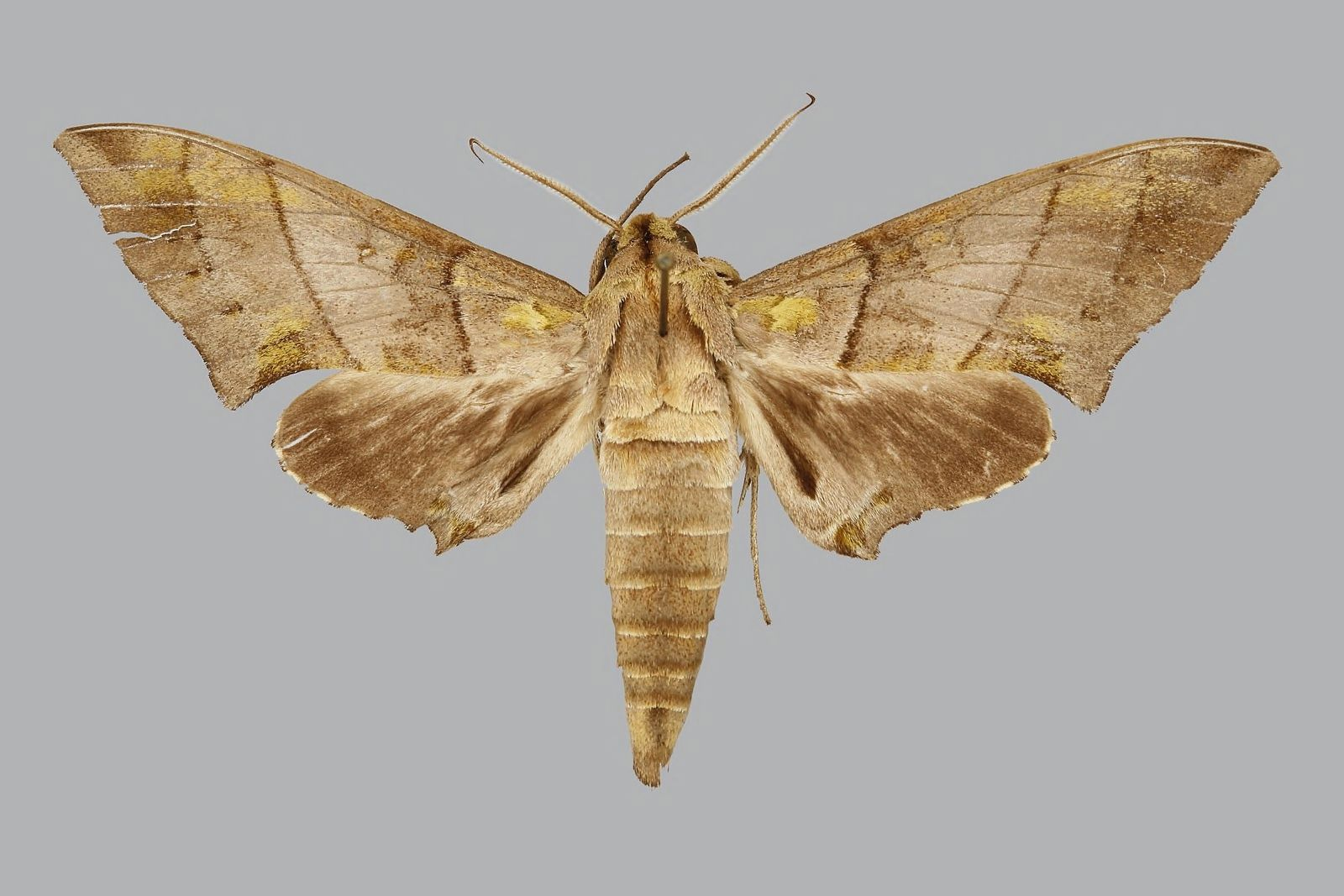

Scientific classification
- Kingdom: Animalia
- Phylum: Arthropoda
- Class: Insecta
- Order: Lepidoptera
- Family: Sphingidae
- Genus: Polyptychus
- Species: P. bernardii

Binomial name
- Polyptychus bernardii Rougeot, 1966

= Polyptychus bernardii =

Species of moth

Polyptychus bernardii is a moth of the family Sphingidae. It is known from Gabon, the Congo and from the Central African Republic.
