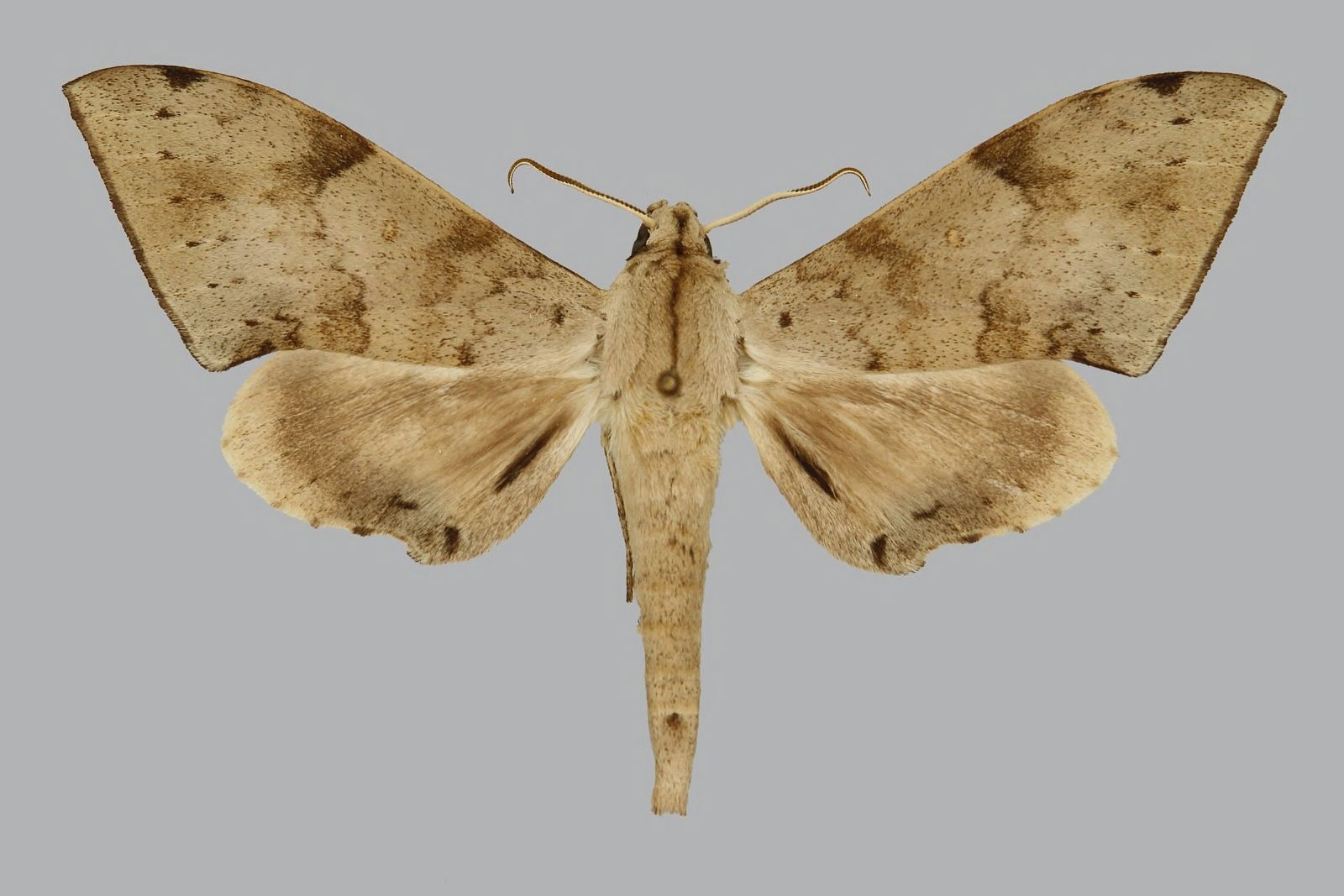

Scientific classification
- Domain: Eukaryota
- Kingdom: Animalia
- Phylum: Arthropoda
- Class: Insecta
- Order: Lepidoptera
- Family: Sphingidae
- Genus: Polyptychus
- Species: P. nigriplaga

Binomial name
- Polyptychus nigriplaga Rothschild & Jordan, 1903

Synonyms
- Polyptychus nigriplagus; Polyptychus nigriplagus f. barnsi Clark, 1926; Polyptychus barnsi Clark, 1926

= Polyptychus nigriplaga =

Species of insect

Polyptychus nigriplaga is a moth in the family Sphingidae. It is native to central and western Africa.

== Subspecies ==
- Polyptychus nigriplaga nigriplaga
- Polyptychus nigriplaga kivui Clark, 1926 (lowland forest from Liberia and the Ivory Coast to the Congo and Uganda)
