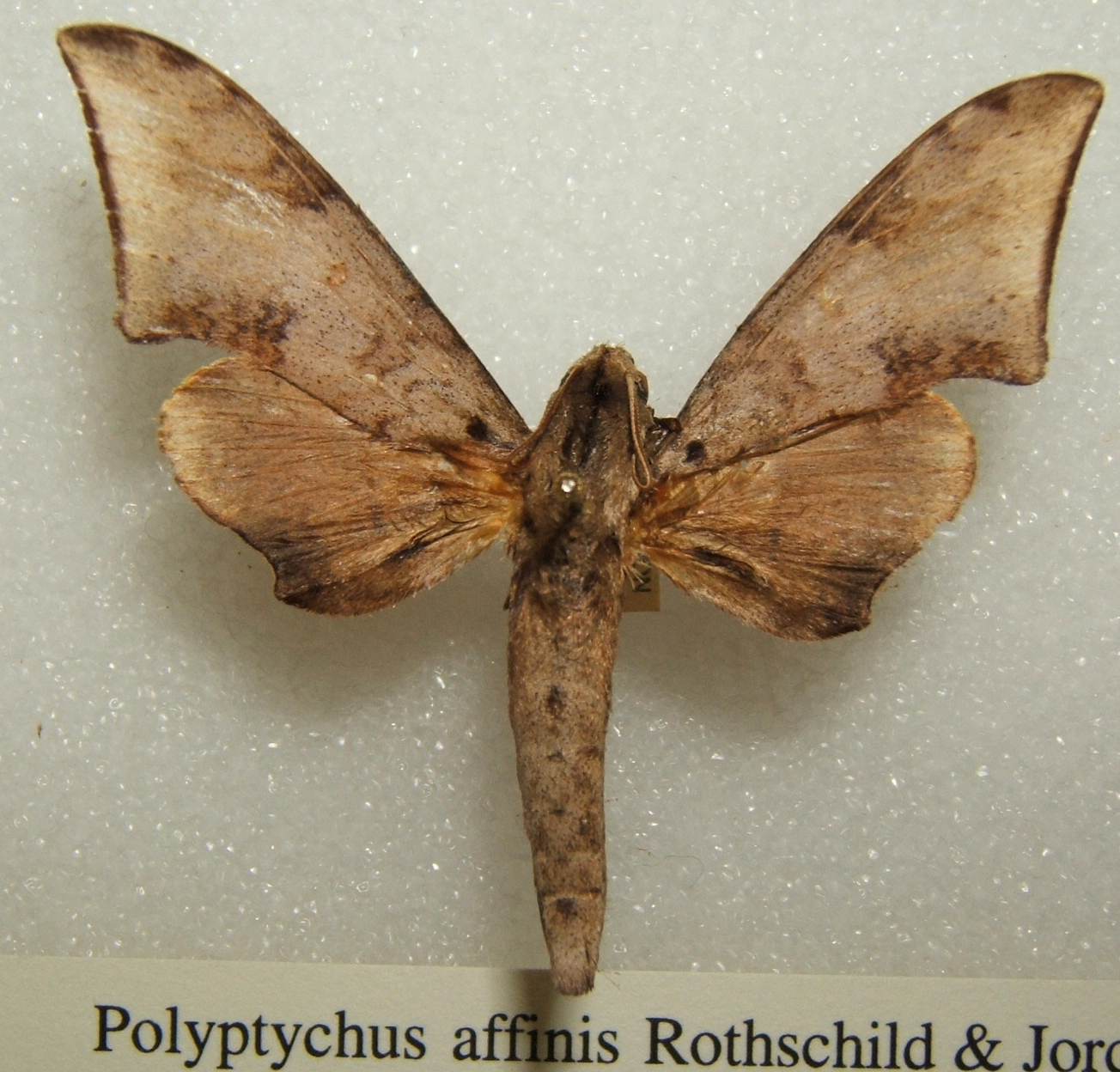

Scientific classification
- Domain: Eukaryota
- Kingdom: Animalia
- Phylum: Arthropoda
- Class: Insecta
- Order: Lepidoptera
- Family: Sphingidae
- Genus: Polyptychus
- Species: P. affinis

Binomial name
- Polyptychus affinis Rothschild & Jordan, 1903

Synonyms
- Polyptychus retusus Rothschild & Jordan, 1908; Polyptychus pierrei Kitching & Cadiou, 2000; Polyptychus modestum Bernardi, 1970

= Polyptychus affinis =

Species of moth

Polyptychus affinis is a moth of the family Sphingidae first described by Walter Rothschild and Karl Jordan in 1903. It is known at elevations up to 6,000 feet (1,800 m) in forests from Sierra Leone to the Congo, Uganda and western Kenya.

The larvae feed on Detarium senegalense and Albizia species.

== Taxonomy ==
Polyptychus retusus is sometimes treated as a valid species.
