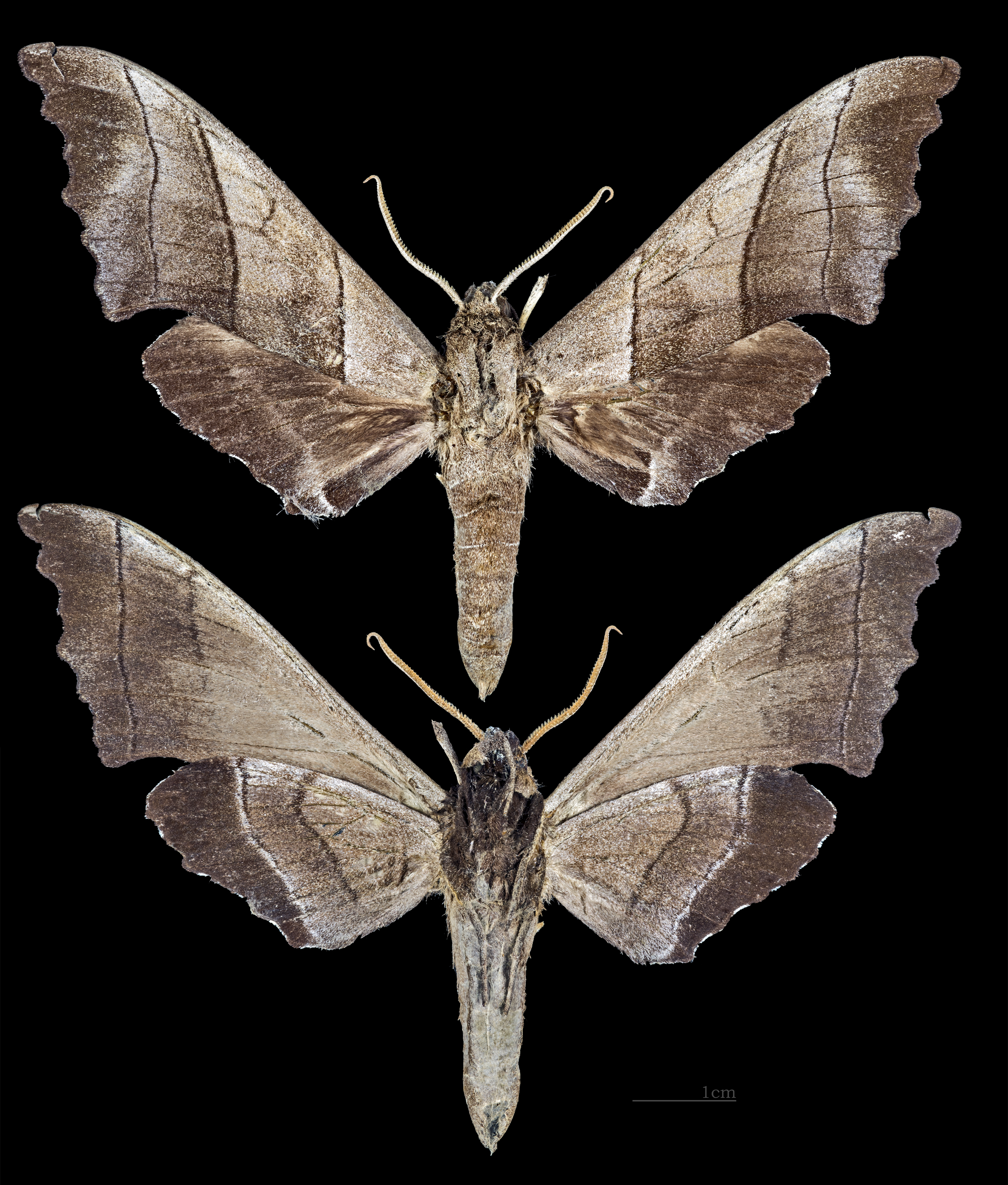
- Polyptychus chinensis

Scientific classification
- Domain: Eukaryota
- Kingdom: Animalia
- Phylum: Arthropoda
- Class: Insecta
- Order: Lepidoptera
- Family: Sphingidae
- Tribe: Smerinthini
- Genus: Polyptychus; Hübner, 1819

Species
- Polyptychus affinis; Polyptychus carteri; Polyptychus chinensis; Polyptychus dentatus; Polyptychus trilineatus; and around 24 others

= Polyptychus =

Genus of moths

Polyptychus is a genus of moths in the family Sphingidae erected by Jacob Hübner in 1819. These middle-sized, light-brown moths are found in Africa and Southeast Asia.

== Description ==
They are a middle-sized to large (wingspan 65–120 mm), light-brown hawk moth. The head is unusually large in subfamily Smerinthinae, with the back of the body long and cylindrical.

== Life ==
These moths fly at night and do not visit flowers, and they do not particularly seek out light. In all cases, they lay their eggs in the plants of the family Boraginaceae.

== Species list ==
- Polyptychus affinis Rothschild & Jordan, 1903 – Africa
- Polyptychus andosa (Walker 1856)
- Polyptychus anochus Rothschild & Jordan 1906
- Polyptychus aurora Clark 1936
- Polyptychus baltus Pierre 1985
- (Polyptychus barnsi) Clark 1926
- Polyptychus baxteri Rothschild & Jordan 1908
- Polyptychus bernardii Rougeot 1966
- Polyptychus carteri (Butler, 1882) – West Africa
- Polyptychus chinensis Rothschild & Jordan, 1903 – central and southwest China, Taiwan, Ryukyu Islands
- Polyptychus claudiae Brechlin, Kitching & Cadiou, 2001
- Polyptychus coryndoni Rothschild & Jordan 1903
- Polyptychus dentatus (Cramer, 1777) – Sri Lanka, India and Pakistan
- Polyptychus distensus Darge 1990
- Polyptychus enodia (Holland 1889)
- Polyptychus girardi Pierre 1993
- Polyptychus herbuloti Darge 1990
- Polyptychus hollandi Rothschild & Jordan 1903
- Polyptychus lapidatus Joicey & Kaye 1917
- Polyptychus murinus Rothschild 1904
- Polyptychus nigriplaga Rothschild & Jordan 1903
- Polyptychus orthographus Rothschild & Jordan 1903
- Polyptychus paupercula Holland 1889
- Polyptychus pierrei Kitching & Cadiou, 2000
- Polyptychus potiendus Darge 1990
- Polyptychus retusus Rothschild & Jordan, 1908
- Polyptychus rougeoti Carcasson 1968
- Polyptychus sinus Pierre 1985
- Polyptychus thihongae Bernardi 1970
- Polyptychus trilineatus Moore, 1888 – India, Vietnam and southern China
- Polyptychus trisecta (Aurivillius 1901)
- Polyptychus wojtusiaki Pierre, 2001
