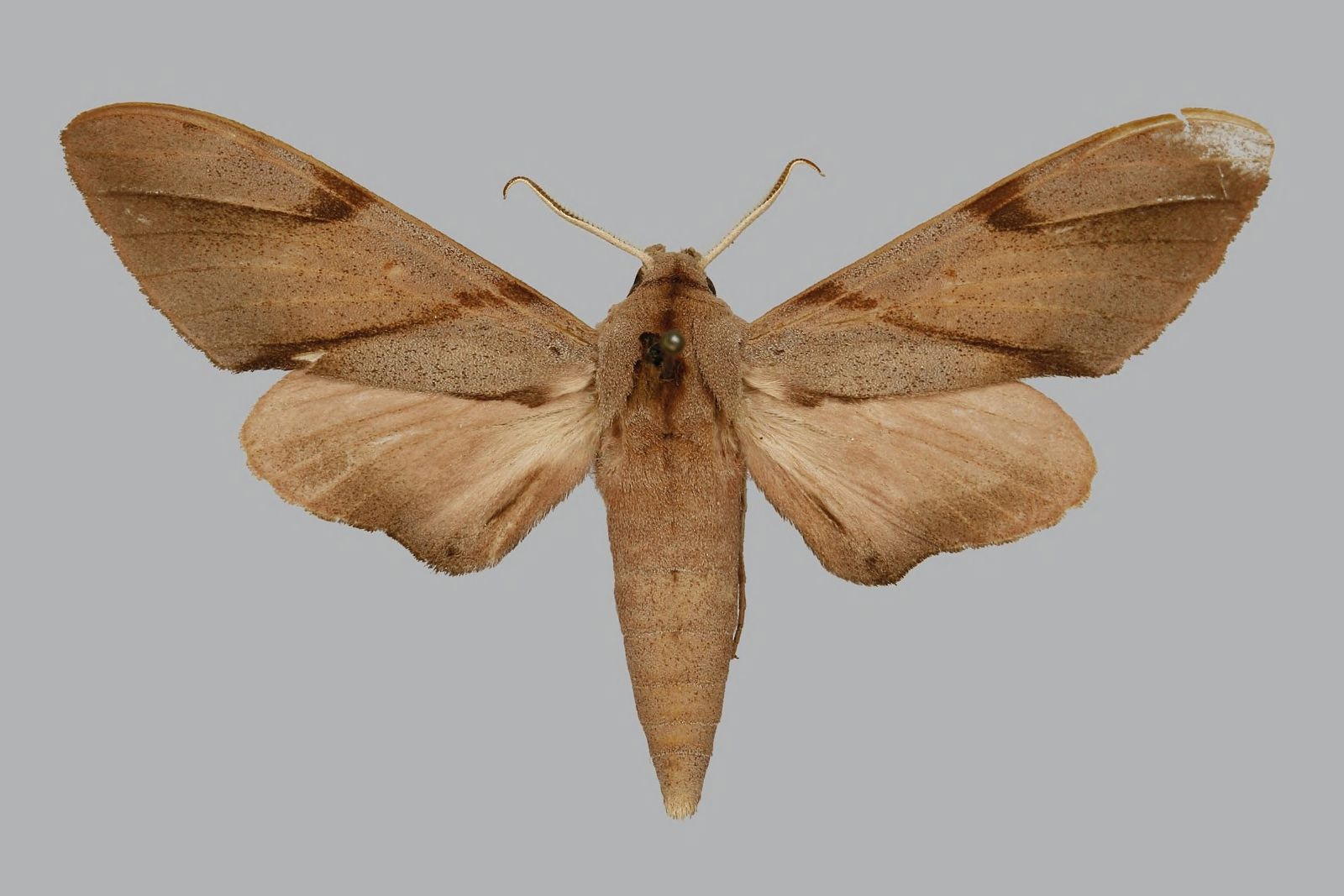

Scientific classification
- Domain: Eukaryota
- Kingdom: Animalia
- Phylum: Arthropoda
- Class: Insecta
- Order: Lepidoptera
- Family: Sphingidae
- Genus: Polyptychus
- Species: P. baxteri

Binomial name
- Polyptychus baxteri Rothschild & Jordan, 1908

= Polyptychus baxteri =

Species of moth

Polyptychus baxteri is a moth of the family Sphingidae. It is known from eastern and western Africa.

The length of the forewings is 26 mm for males, females are somewhat larger.

The larvae feed on Thespesia species.

== Subspecies ==
- Polyptychus baxteri baxteri (Braehystegia savanna and woodland in Tanzania and Zambia)
- Polyptychus baxteri jansei Clark, 1936 (Zimbabwe and western Mozambique)
