= Polyptychus wojtusiaki =

Scientific classification
- Kingdom: Animalia
- Phylum: Arthropoda
- Class: Insecta
- Order: Lepidoptera
- Family: Sphingidae
- Genus: Polyptychus
- Species: P. wojtusiaki

Binomial name
- Polyptychus wojtusiaki Pierre, 2001

Species of moth

Polyptychus wojtusiaki is a moth of the family Sphingidae. It is distributed in Nigeria.
