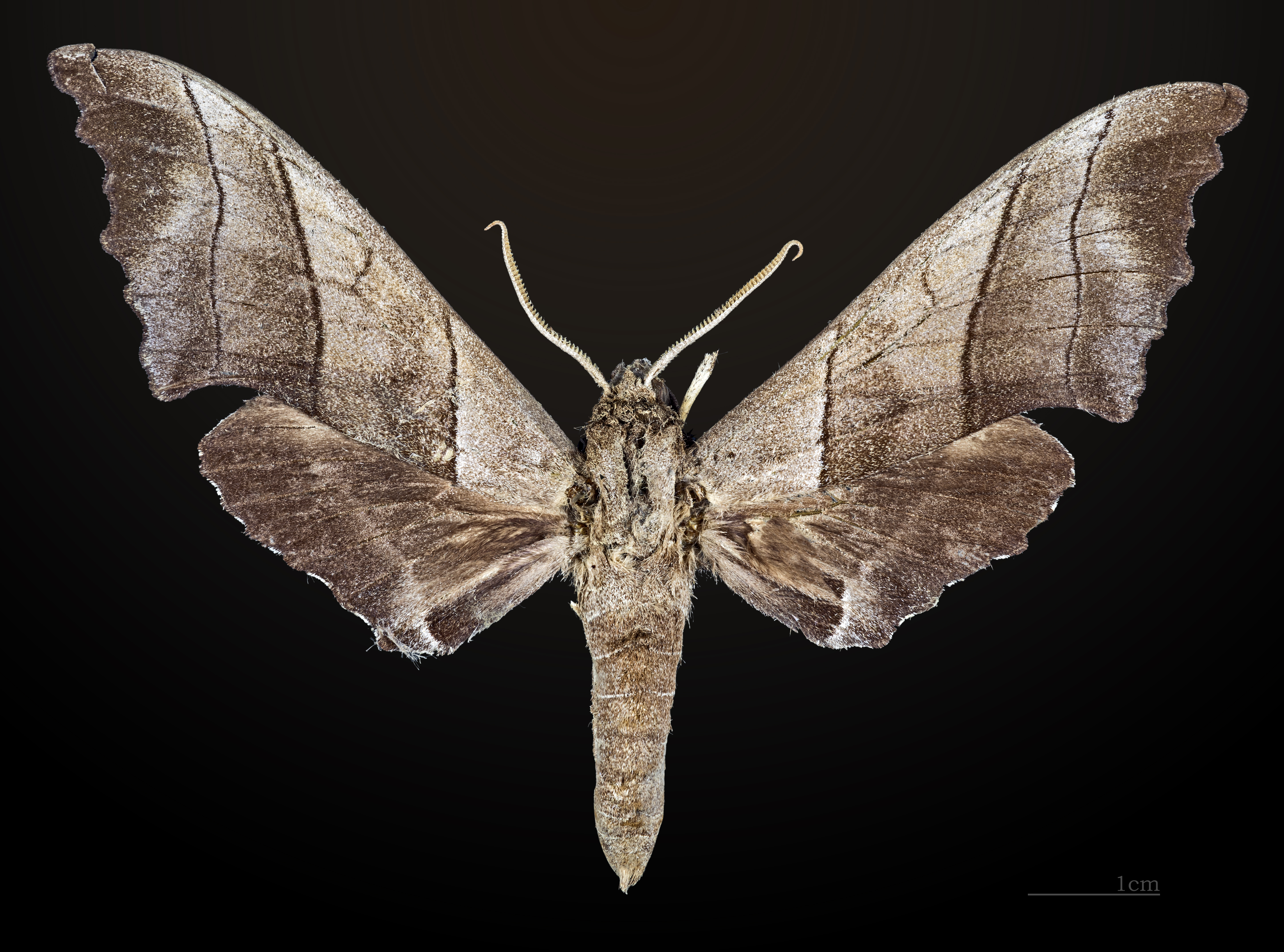
- Dorsal view

Scientific classification
- Domain: Eukaryota
- Kingdom: Animalia
- Phylum: Arthropoda
- Class: Insecta
- Order: Lepidoptera
- Family: Sphingidae
- Genus: Polyptychus
- Species: P. chinensis

Binomial name
- Polyptychus chinensis Rothschild & Jordan, 1903

Synonyms
- Polyptychus draconis Rothschild & Jordan, 1916

= Polyptychus chinensis =

Species of moth

Polyptychus chinensis, the Chinese crenulate hawkmoth, is a moth of the family Sphingidae. It is known from China, Taiwan and the Ryukyu Archipelago.

== Description ==
The wingspan is 92–112 mm.

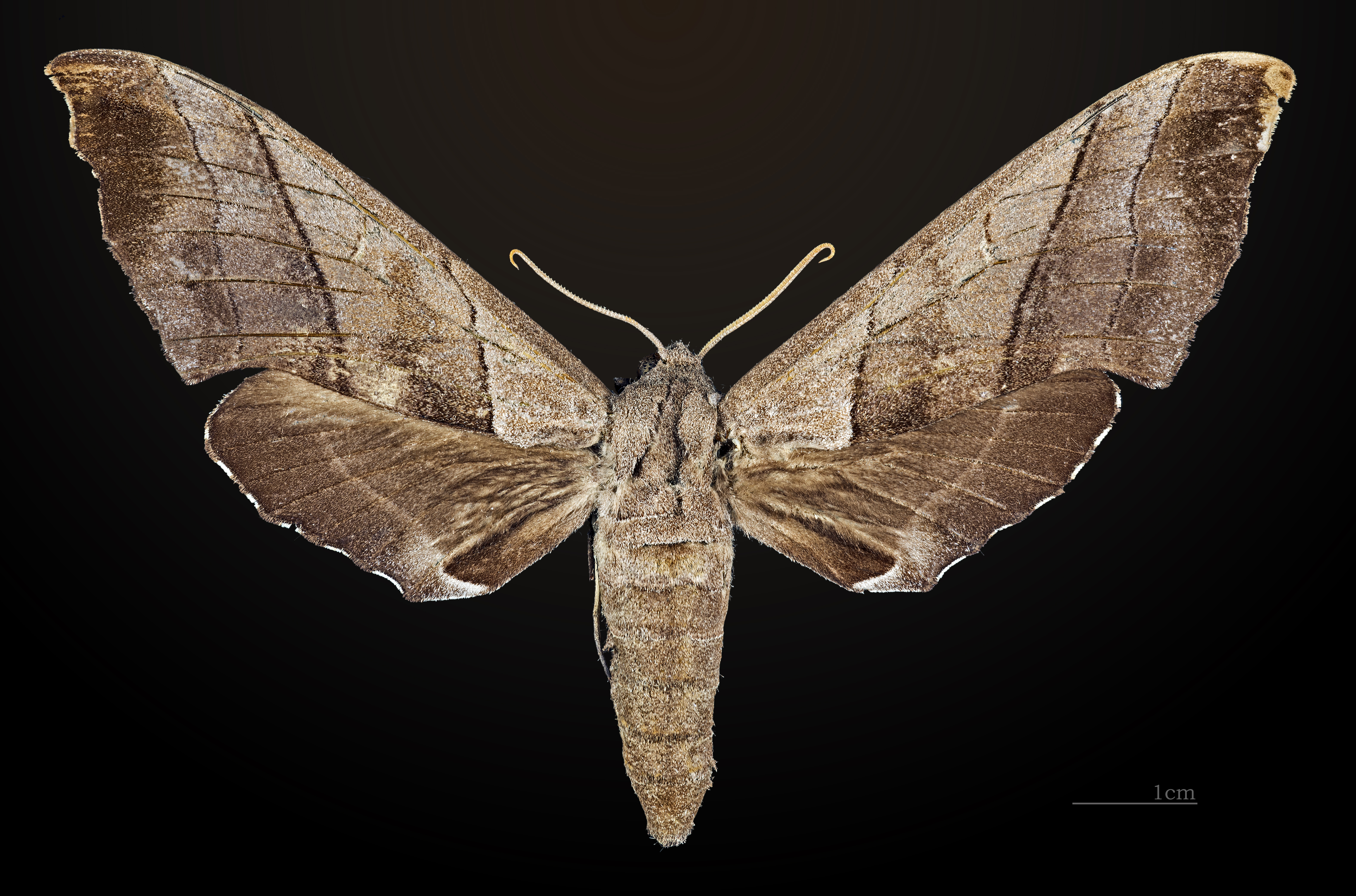
Female

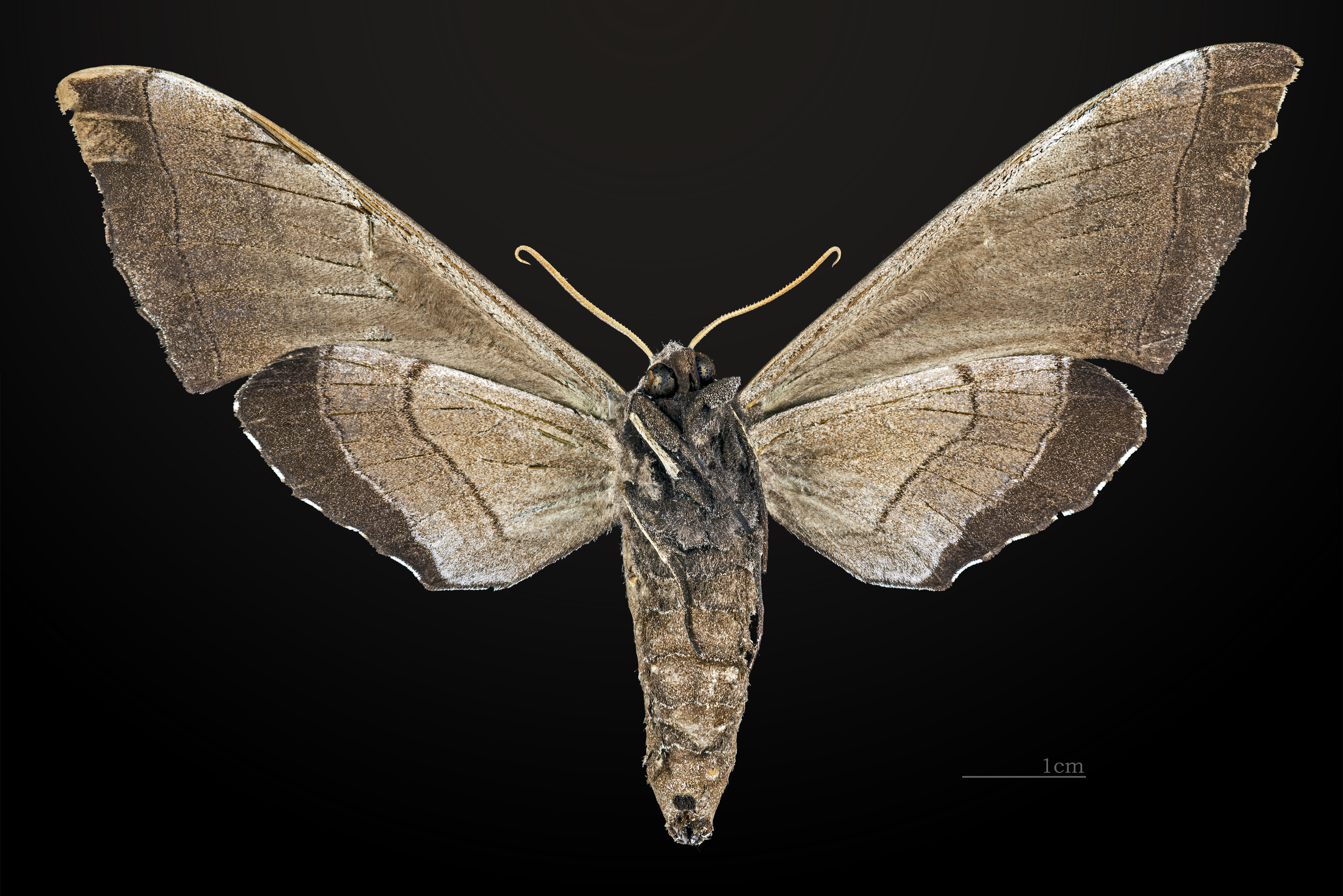
Female underside

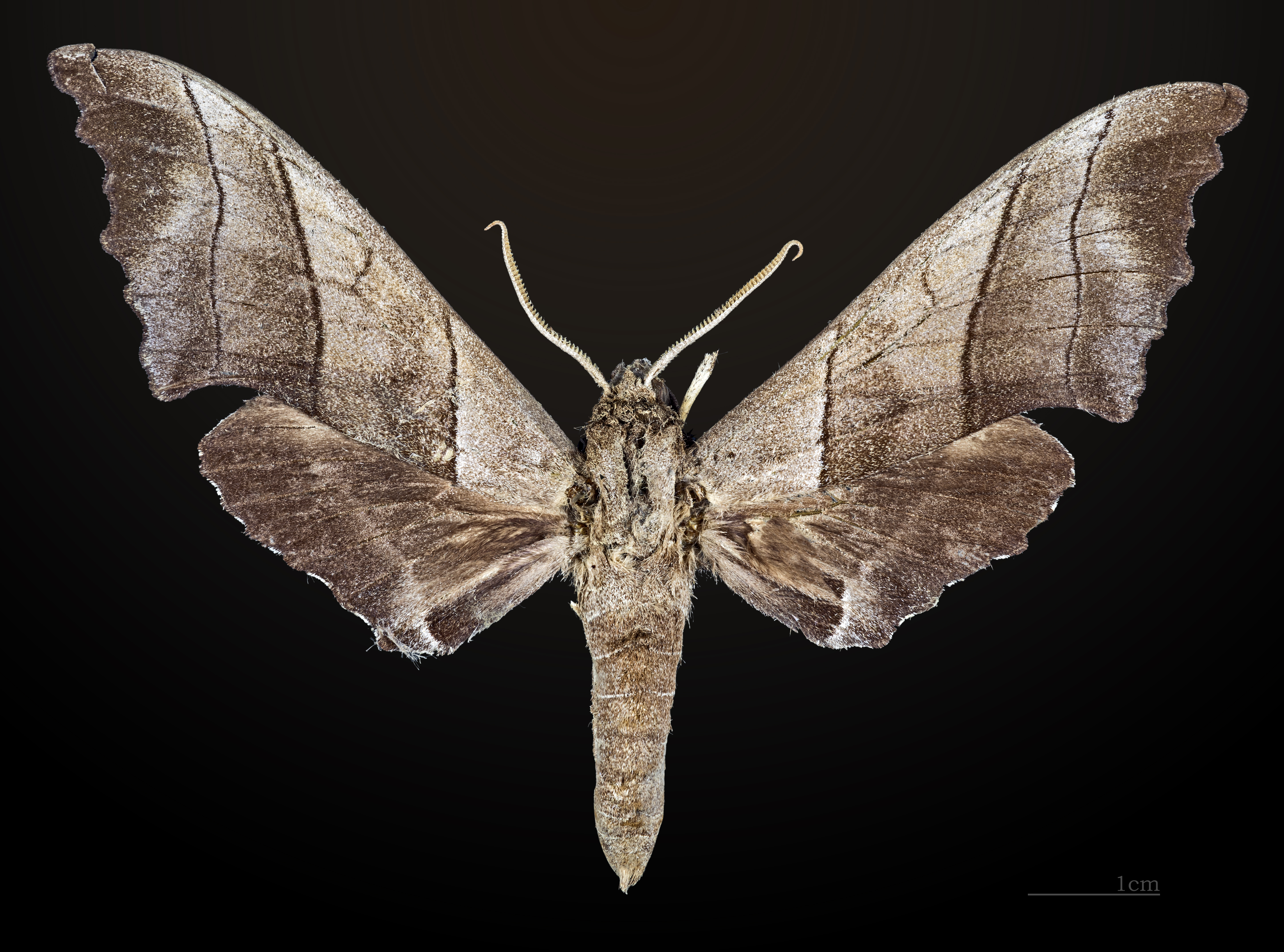
Male

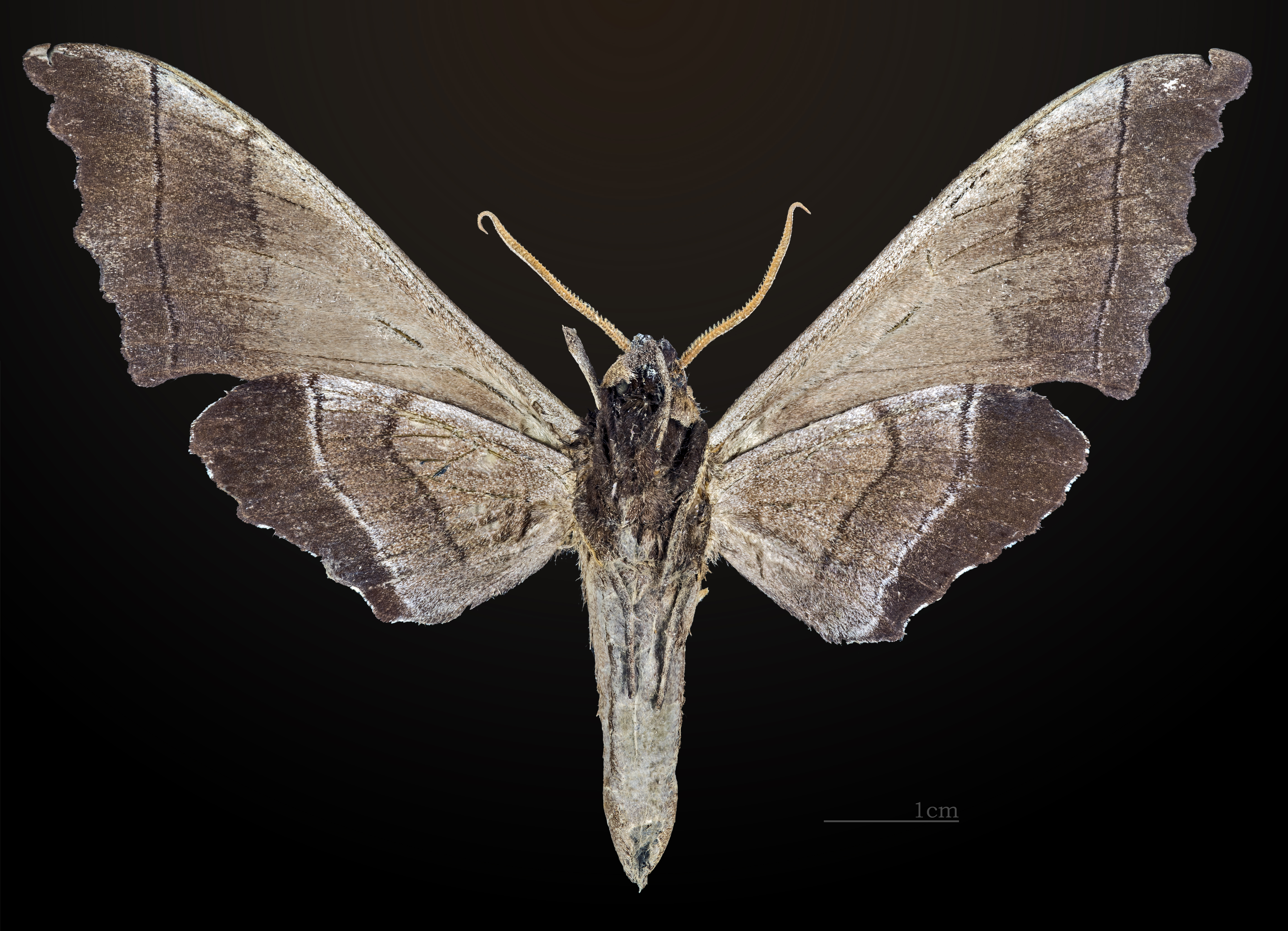
Male underside

== Subspecies ==
- Polyptychus chinensis chinensis (Taiwan and the southern Ryukyu Archipelago)
- Polyptychus chinensis draconis Rothschild & Jordan, 1916 (Central to southwestern China)
- Polyptychus chinensis draconoides Mell, 1935 (Central to eastern China)
- Polyptychus chinensis shaanxiensis Brechlin, 2008 (Shaanxi)
