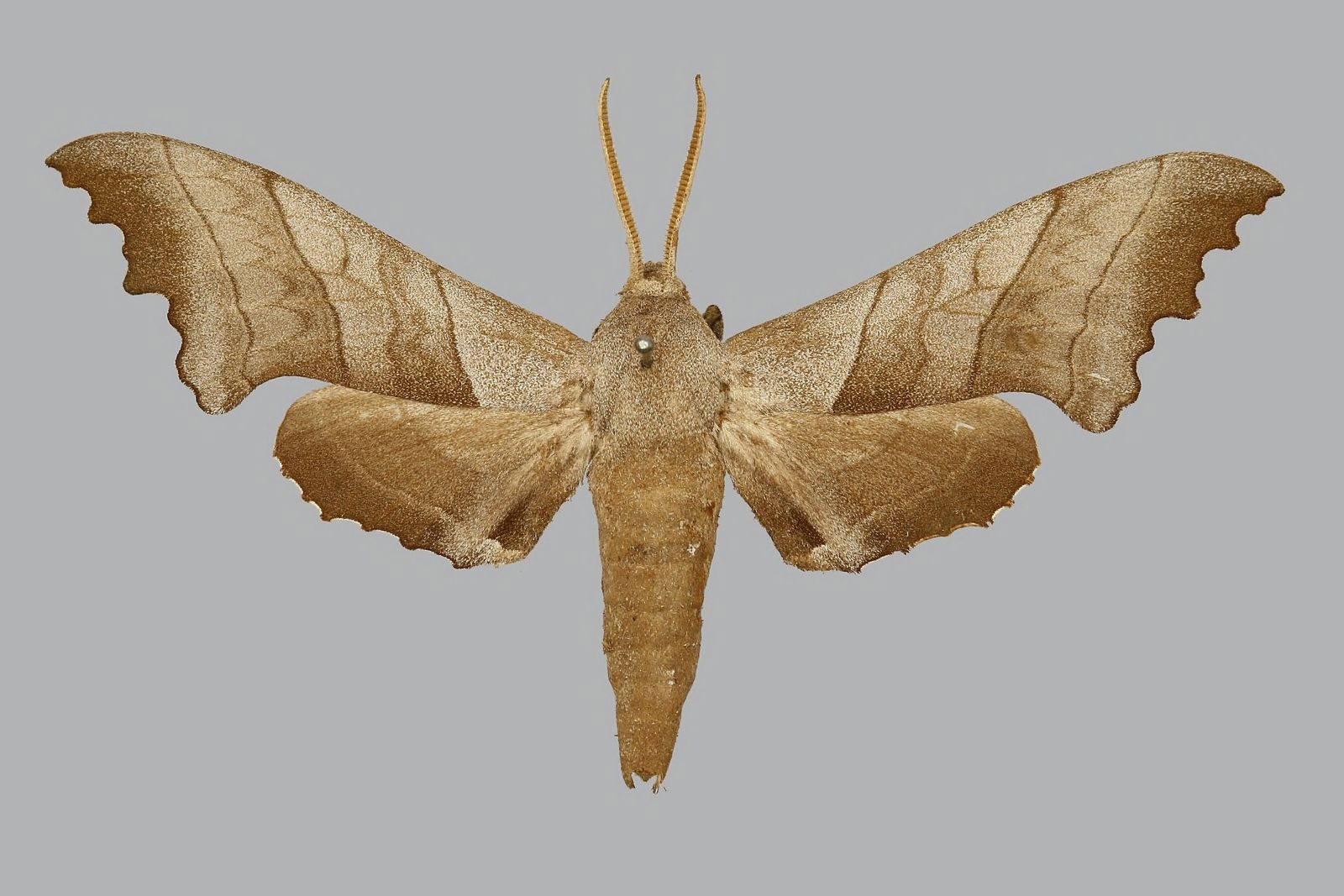

Scientific classification
- Domain: Eukaryota
- Kingdom: Animalia
- Phylum: Arthropoda
- Class: Insecta
- Order: Lepidoptera
- Family: Sphingidae
- Genus: Polyptychus
- Species: P. dentatus

Binomial name
- Polyptychus dentatus (Cramer, 1777)

Synonyms
- Sphinx dentatus Cramer, 1777; Sphinx modesta Fabricius, 1793; Sphinx timesius Stoll, 1790

= Polyptychus dentatus =

Species of moth

Polyptychus dentatus, the straight-lined crenulate hawkmoth, is a moth of the family Sphingidae. It is known for being from Sri Lanka, tropical India and tropical Pakistan.

The wingspan is 92–120 mm.

In India, larvae have been recorded on Cordia dichotoma, Cordia sebestena and Ehretia laevis. Mature larvae are about 100 mm long.
