= Polyptychus distensus =

Scientific classification
- Domain: Eukaryota
- Kingdom: Animalia
- Phylum: Arthropoda
- Class: Insecta
- Order: Lepidoptera
- Family: Sphingidae
- Genus: Polyptychus
- Species: P. distensus

Binomial name
- Polyptychus distensus Darge, 1990

Species of moth

Polyptychus distensus is a moth of the family Sphingidae. It is known from Gabon.
