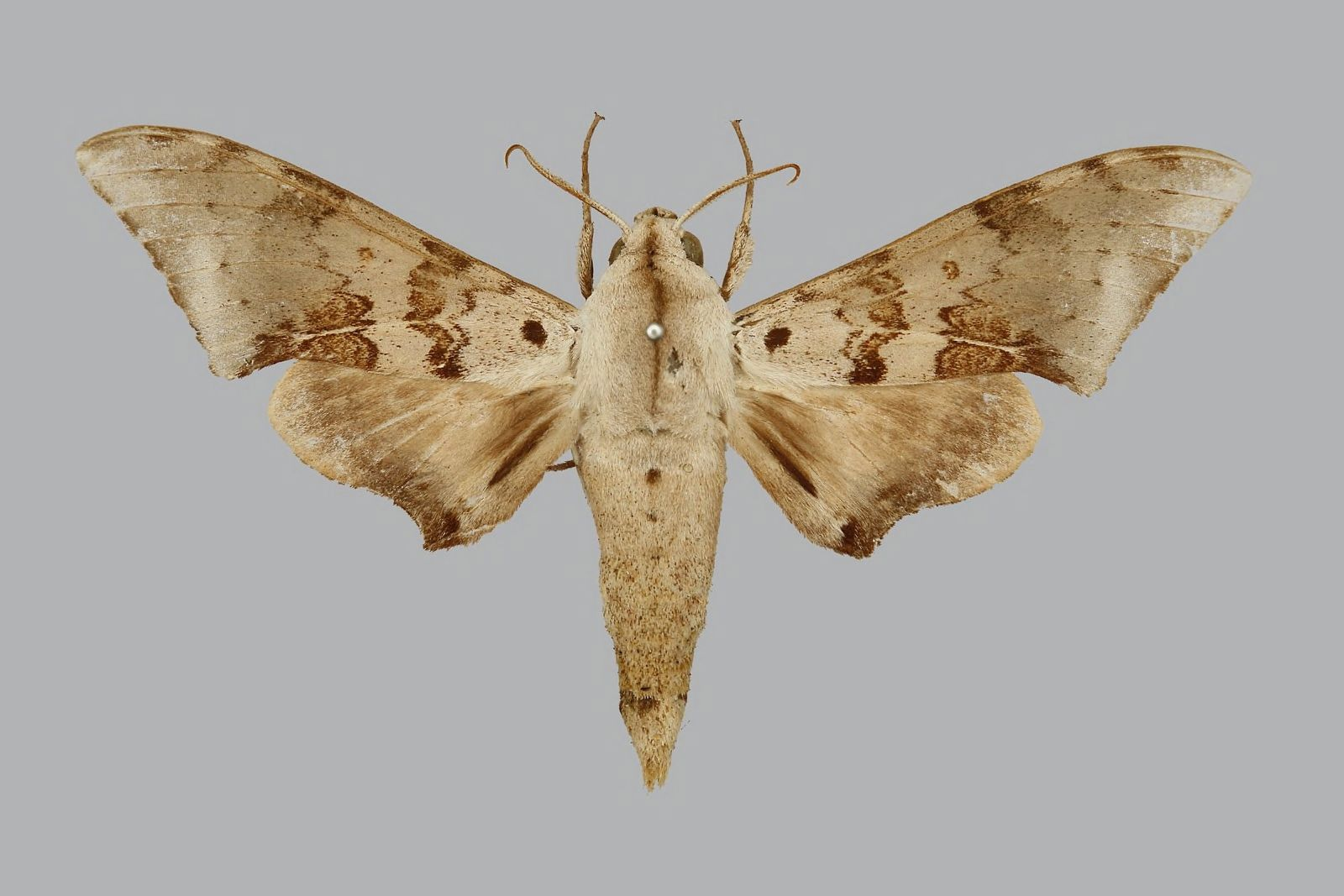

Scientific classification
- Domain: Eukaryota
- Kingdom: Animalia
- Phylum: Arthropoda
- Class: Insecta
- Order: Lepidoptera
- Family: Sphingidae
- Genus: Polyptychus
- Species: P. murinus

Binomial name
- Polyptychus murinus Rothschild, 1904

= Polyptychus murinus =

Species of moth

Polyptychus murinus is a moth of the family Sphingidae. It is found in places such as Liberia, Nigeria, Ghana, Cameroon, the Democratic Republic of the Congo, Angola, Ivory Coast and the Central African Republic. Their wingspan is an average of 7 cm.
