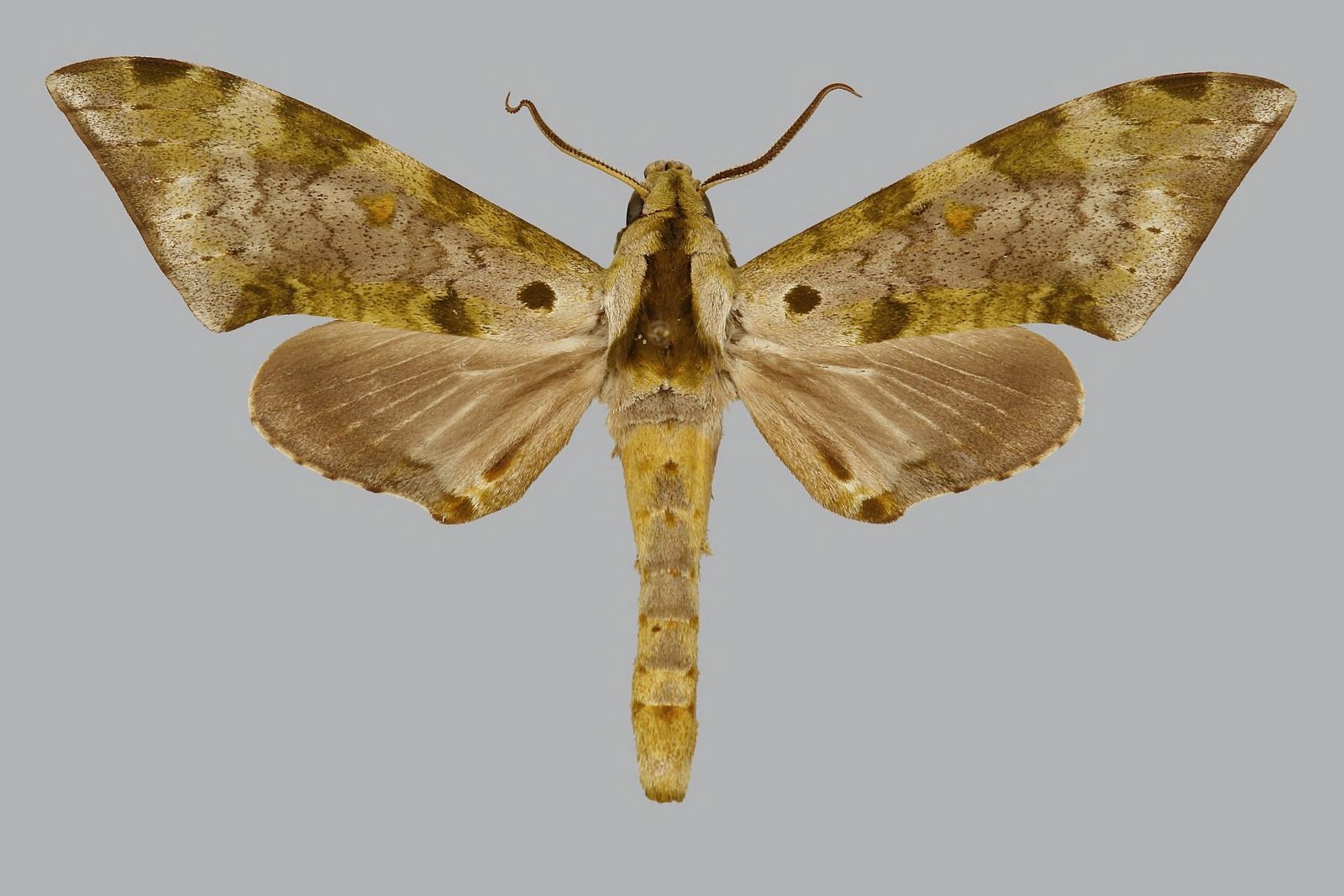

Scientific classification
- Kingdom: Animalia
- Phylum: Arthropoda
- Clade: Pancrustacea
- Class: Insecta
- Order: Lepidoptera
- Family: Sphingidae
- Genus: Polyptychus
- Species: P. rougeoti

Binomial name
- Polyptychus rougeoti Carcasson, 1968

= Polyptychus rougeoti =

Species of moth

Polyptychus rougeoti is a moth of the family Sphingidae. It is known from Gabon.

The forewings are long and narrow, apex acute.
