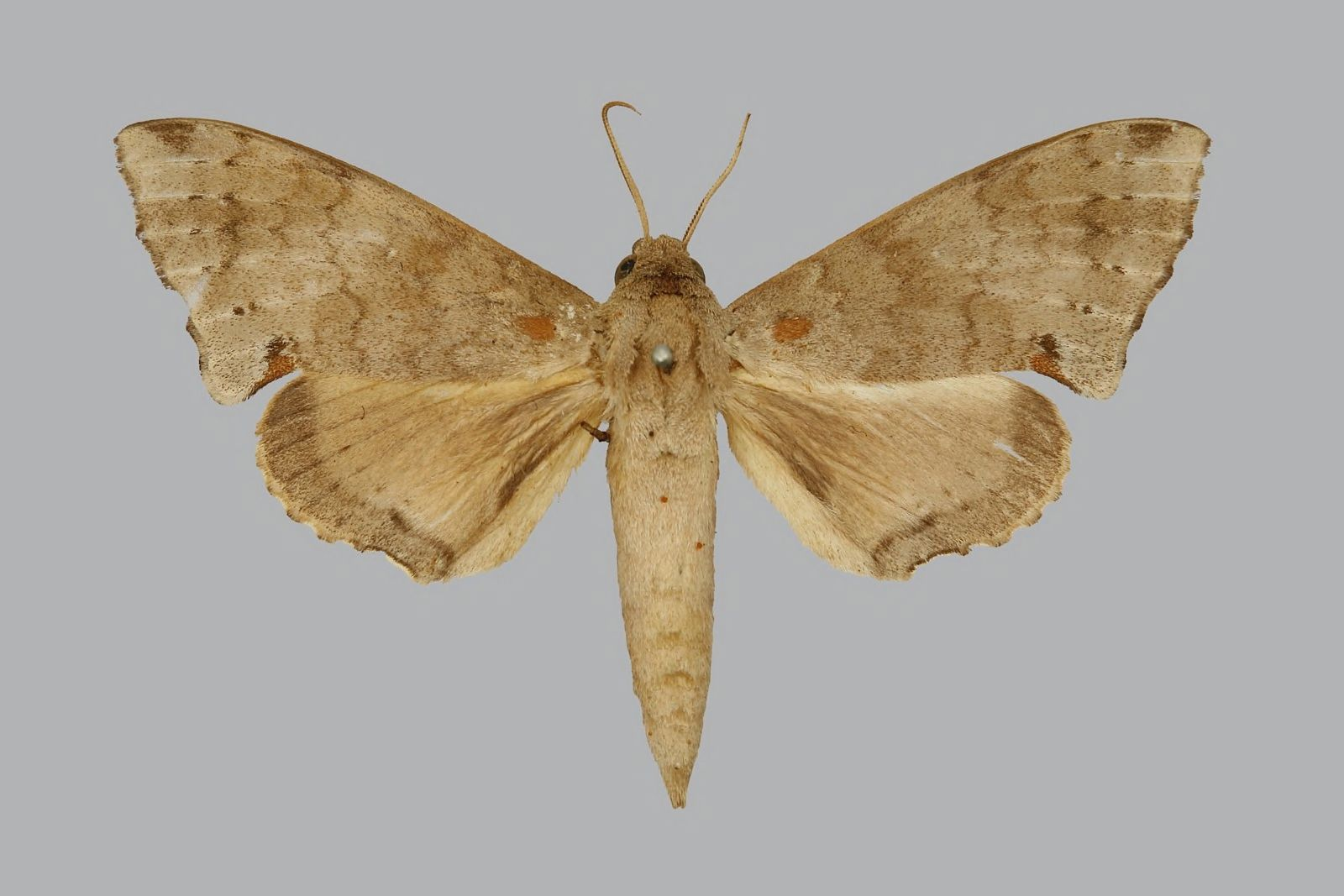

Scientific classification
- Domain: Eukaryota
- Kingdom: Animalia
- Phylum: Arthropoda
- Class: Insecta
- Order: Lepidoptera
- Family: Sphingidae
- Genus: Polyptychus
- Species: P. paupercula

Binomial name
- Polyptychus paupercula (Holland, 1889)

Synonyms
- Polyptychus pauperculus; Dewitzia paupercula Holland, 1889; Polyptychus inconspicuus Strand, 1912

= Polyptychus paupercula =

Species of moth

Polyptychus paupercula is a moth of the family Sphingidae. It is known from forests from Liberia to Uganda.

== Subspecies ==
- Polyptychus paupercula inconspicuus Strand, 1912
- Polyptychus paupercula paupercula
- Polyptychus paupercula senniger Jordan, 1920
