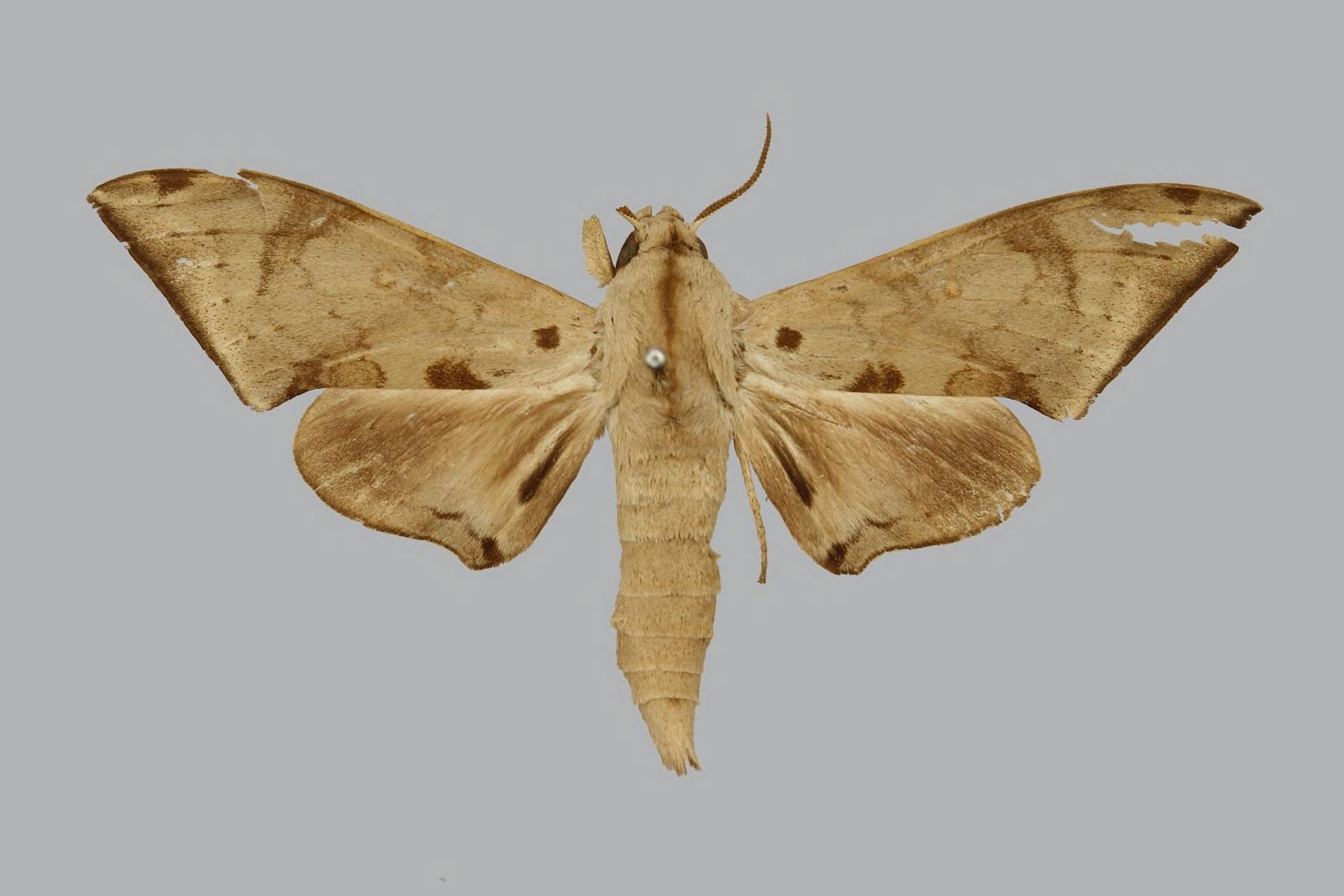

Scientific classification
- Domain: Eukaryota
- Kingdom: Animalia
- Phylum: Arthropoda
- Class: Insecta
- Order: Lepidoptera
- Family: Sphingidae
- Genus: Polyptychus
- Species: P. lapidatus

Binomial name
- Polyptychus lapidatus Joicey & Kaye, 1917

= Polyptychus lapidatus =

Species of moth

Polyptychus lapidatus is a moth of the family Sphingidae. It is found from Liberia to Ghana and Gabon.
