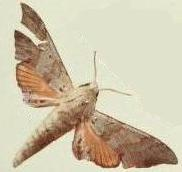

Scientific classification
- Kingdom: Animalia
- Phylum: Arthropoda
- Class: Insecta
- Order: Lepidoptera
- Family: Sphingidae
- Genus: Polyptychus
- Species: P. andosa

Binomial name
- Polyptychus andosa (Walker, 1856)

Synonyms
- Panacra andosa Walker, 1856; Polyptychus andosus

= Polyptychus andosa =

Coryndon's polyptychus

Species of moth

Polyptychus andosa, or Coryndon's polyptychus, is a moth of the family Sphingidae. It is known from eastern and western Africa.

The length of the forewings is 26–29 mm for males and about 30 mm for females.

The larvae feed on Morus and Parinare species.

== Subspecies ==
- Polyptychus andosa andosa (Forests from Sierra Leone to Nigeria)
- Polyptychus andosa tiro Kernbach, 1957 (Forests from the Congo to Uganda)
- Polyptychus andosa amaniensis Carcasson, 1968 (Tanzania)
