= Polyptychus baltus =

Scientific classification
- Kingdom: Animalia
- Phylum: Arthropoda
- Class: Insecta
- Order: Lepidoptera
- Family: Sphingidae
- Genus: Polyptychus
- Species: P. baltus

Binomial name
- Polyptychus baltus Pierre, 1985

Species of moth

Polyptychus baltus is a moth of the family Sphingidae. It is known from Gabon.
