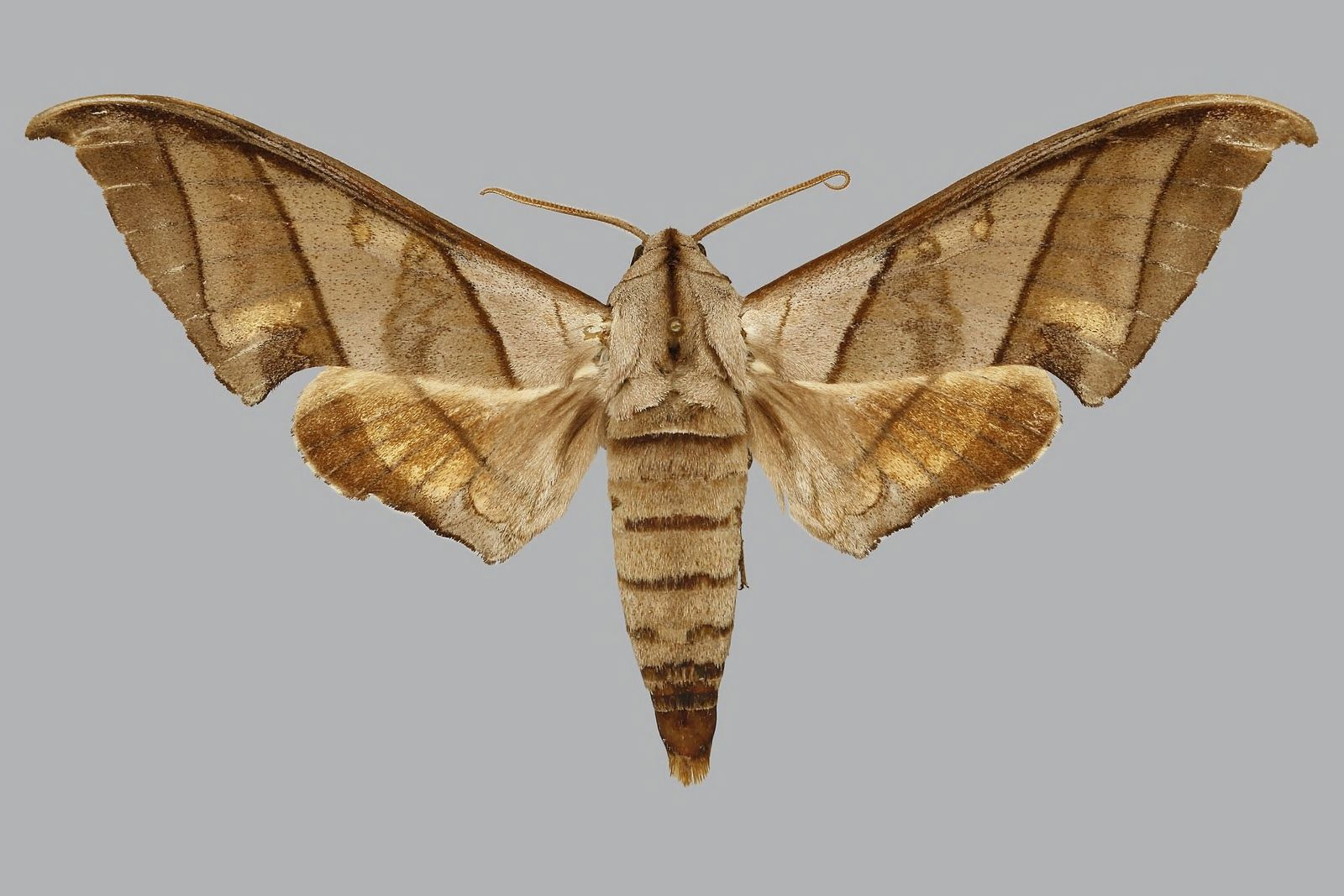

Scientific classification
- Domain: Eukaryota
- Kingdom: Animalia
- Phylum: Arthropoda
- Class: Insecta
- Order: Lepidoptera
- Family: Sphingidae
- Genus: Polyptychus
- Species: P. trisecta

Binomial name
- Polyptychus trisecta Aurivillius, 1901

Synonyms
- Polyptychus trisectus

= Polyptychus trisecta =

Species of moth

Polyptychus trisecta is a moth of the family Sphingidae. It is known from lowland forests from Liberia and Ghana to the Congo and western Uganda.

The length of the forewings is 42–45 mm.
