= List of moths of Cameroon =

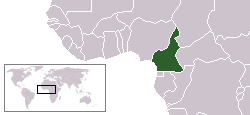
Location of Cameroon

There are about 1,400 known moth species in Cameroon. The moths (mostly nocturnal) and butterflies (mostly diurnal) together make up the taxonomic order Lepidoptera.

== Alucitidae ==
- Alucita illuminatrix (Meyrick, 1929)
- Alucita megaphimus (Hering, 1917)

== Anomoeotidae ==
- Anomoeotes instabilis Talbot, 1929
- Anomoeotes leucolena Holland, 1893
- Anomoeotes phaeomera Hampson, 1920
- Anomoeotes tenellula Holland, 1893
- Staphylinochrous euryperalis Hampson, 1910
- Staphylinochrous euriphaea Hampson, 1920
- Staphylinochrous ruficilia Hampson, 1920

== Arctiidae ==
- Acantharctia nivea Aurivillius, 1900
- Afraloa bifurca (Walker, 1855)
- Afrasura discocellularis (Strand, 1912)
- Afrasura hieroglyphica (Bethune-Baker, 1911)
- Afrasura numida (Holland, 1893)
- Afrasura obliterata (Walker, 1864)
- Afrasura peripherica (Strand, 1912)
- Afroarctia bergeri Toulgoët, 1978
- Afroarctia dargei (Toulgoët, 1976)
- Afroarctia kenyana (Rothschild, 1933)
- Afroarctia mamfei Toulgoët, 1978
- Afroarctia nebulosa Toulgoët, 1980
- Afroarctia sjostedti (Aurivillius, 1900)
- Agylloides problematica Strand, 1912
- Aloa moloneyi (Druce, 1887)
- Alpenus maculosa (Stoll, 1781)
- Alpenus schraderi (Rothschild, 1910)
- Alpenus thomasi Watson, 1988
- Amata alenicola (Strand, 1912)
- Amata alicia (Butler, 1876)
- Amata benitonis Strand, 1912
- Amata borguensis (Hampson, 1901)
- Amata flavoanalis (Seitz, 1926)
- Amata leucerythra (Holland, 1893)
- Amata marina (Butler, 1876)
- Amata ploetzi (Strand, 1912)
- Amata tomasina (Butler, 1876)
- Amata uelleburgensis (Strand, 1912)
- Amata waldowi (Grünberg, 1907)
- Amerila atrivena (Hampson, 1907)
- Amerila brunnea (Hampson, 1901)
- Amerila femina (Berio, 1935)
- Amerila fennia (Druce, 1887)
- Amerila luteibarba (Hampson, 1901)
- Amerila nigroapicalis (Aurivillius, 1900)
- Amerila niveivitrea (Bartel, 1903)
- Amphicallia pactolicus (Butler, 1888)
- Amsacta bicoloria (Gaede, 1916)
- Amsacta flavicostata (Gaede, 1916)
- Anapisa cleta (Plötz, 1880)
- Anapisa crenophylax (Holland, 1893)
- Anapisa melaleuca (Holland, 1898)
- Anapisa monotica (Holland, 1893)
- Anapisa sjoestedti (Aurivillius, 1904)
- Archithosia costimacula (Mabille, 1878)
- Archithosia duplicata Birket-Smith, 1965
- Archithosia makomensis (Strand, 1912)
- Archithosia similis Birket-Smith, 1965
- Archithosia sordida Birket-Smith, 1965
- Argina amanda (Boisduval, 1847)
- Asura camerunensis Strand, 1912
- Asura craigii (Holland, 1893)
- Asura pectinella Strand, 1922
- Asythosia velutina Birket-Smith, 1965
- Balacra batesi Druce, 1910
- Balacra brunnea Grünberg, 1907
- Balacra caeruleifascia Walker, 1856
- Balacra daphaena (Hampson, 1898)
- Balacra elegans Aurivillius, 1892
- Balacra flavimacula Walker, 1856
- Balacra haemalea Holland, 1893
- Balacra herona (Druce, 1887)
- Balacra jaensis Bethune-Baker, 1927
- Balacra nigripennis (Aurivillius, 1904)
- Balacra preussi (Aurivillius, 1904)
- Balacra pulchra Aurivillius, 1892
- Balacra rubricincta Holland, 1893
- Balacra rubrostriata (Aurivillius, 1892)
- Bergeria haematochrysa Kiriakoff, 1952
- Binna scita (Walker, 1865)
- Cameroonia nigriceps (Aurivillius, 1904)
- Caryatis hersilia Druce, 1887
- Caryatis phileta (Drury, 1782)
- Caryatis syntomina Butler, 1878
- Ceryx alenina Strand, 1912
- Ceryx barombina Gaede, 1926
- Ceryx elasson (Holland, 1893)
- Ceryx hilda (Ehrmann, 1894)
- Ceryx infranigra (Strand, 1912)
- Cyana flammeostrigata Karisch, 2003
- Cyana loloana (Strand, 1912)
- Cyana rubriterminalis (Strand, 1912)
- Cyana rufeola Karisch & Dall'Asta, 2010
- Cyana trigutta (Walker, 1854)
- Disparctia vittata (Druce, 1898)
- Dubatolovia neurophaea (Hampson, 1911)
- Eilema angustipennis Strand, 1912
- Eilema bueana Strand, 1912
- Eilema goniophoroides Strand, 1912
- Eilema mesosticta Hampson, 1911
- Eilema pulverosa Aurivillius, 1904
- Epilacydes scita (Walker, 1865)
- Epilacydes simulans Butler, 1875
- Epitoxis myopsychoides Strand, 1912
- Euchromia guineensis (Fabricius, 1775)
- Euchromia lethe (Fabricius, 1775)
- Galtara aurivilii (Pagenstecher, 1901)
- Hippurarctia cinereoguttata (Strand, 1912)
- Hippurarctia ferrigera (Druce, 1910)
- Logunovium nigricosta (Holland, 1893)
- Logunovium scortillum Wallengren, 1875
- Mecistorhabdia haematoessa (Holland, 1893)
- Meganaclia perpusilla (Walker, 1856)
- Meganaclia sippia (Plötz, 1880)
- Melisa diptera (Walker, 1854)
- Melisoides lobata Strand, 1912
- Metarctia benitensis Holland, 1893
- Metarctia forsteri Kiriakoff, 1955
- Metarctia inconspicua Holland, 1892
- Metarctia lateritia Herrich-Schäffer, 1855
- Metarctia pamela Kiriakoff, 1957
- Metarctia rubripuncta Hampson, 1898
- Micralarctia punctulatum (Wallengren, 1860)
- Microbergeria luctuosa Kiriakoff, 1972
- Muxta xanthopa (Holland, 1893)
- Myopsyche fulvibasalis (Hampson, 1918)
- Myopsyche idda (Plötz, 1880)
- Myopsyche miserabilis (Holland, 1893)
- Myopsyche nervalis Strand, 1912
- Myopsyche ochsenheimeri (Boisduval, 1829)
- Myopsyche victorina (Plötz, 1880)
- Myopsyche xanthopleura (Holland, 1898)
- Nacliodes microsippia Strand, 1912
- Nanna ceratopygia Birket-Smith, 1965
- Nanna diplisticta (Bethune-Baker, 1911)
- Nanna eningae (Plötz, 1880)
- Nanna kamerunica Kühne, 2007
- Nanna loloana (Strand, 1912)
- Nanna magna Birket-Smith, 1965
- Neophemula vitrina (Oberthür, 1909)
- Neuroxena aberrans Bethune-Baker, 1927
- Neuroxena albofasciata (Druce, 1910)
- Neuroxena fulleri (Druce, 1883)
- Neuroxena obscurascens (Strand, 1909)
- Nyctemera acraeina Druce, 1882
- Nyctemera apicalis (Walker, 1854)
- Nyctemera arieticornis (Strand, 1909)
- Nyctemera chromis Druce, 1882
- Nyctemera druna (Swinhoe, 1904)
- Nyctemera hemixantha (Aurivillius, 1904)
- Nyctemera itokina (Aurivillius, 1904)
- Nyctemera perspicua (Walker, 1854)
- Nyctemera rattrayi (Swinhoe, 1904)
- Nyctemera xanthura (Plötz, 1880)
- Paralpenus flavicosta (Hampson, 1909)
- Paramelisa lophuroides Oberthür, 1911
- Pericaliella melanodisca (Hampson, 1907)
- Phryganopsis angulifascia (Strand, 1912)
- Pliniola nigristriata (Holland, 1893)
- Poliosia nigrifrons Hampson, 1900
- Pseudothyretes rubicundula (Strand, 1912)
- Pusiola celida (Bethune-Baker, 1911)
- Pusiola monotonia (Strand, 1912)
- Pusiola occidentalis (Strand, 1912)
- Pusiola squamosa (Bethune-Baker, 1911)
- Radiarctia lutescens (Walker, 1854)
- Rhabdomarctia rubrilineata (Bethune-Baker, 1911)
- Rhipidarctia conradti (Oberthür, 1911)
- Rhipidarctia flaviceps (Hampson, 1898)
- Rhipidarctia invaria (Walker, 1856)
- Rhipidarctia miniata Kiriakoff, 1957
- Rhipidarctia rubrovitta (Aurivillius, 1904)
- Spilosoma aurantiaca (Holland, 1893)
- Spilosoma batesi (Rothschild, 1910)
- Spilosoma immaculata Bartel, 1903
- Spilosoma rava (Druce, 1898)
- Spilosoma sulphurea Bartel, 1903
- Spilosoma togoensis Bartel, 1903
- Stenarctia abdominalis Rothschild, 1910
- Stenarctia quadripunctata Aurivillius, 1900
- Tesma fractifascia (Hampson, 1918)
- Tesma nigrapex (Strand, 1912)
- Thyrogonia efulensis (Holland, 1898)
- Trichaeta schultzei Aurivillius, 1905
- Zobida trinitas (Strand, 1912)

== Bombycidae ==
- Amusaron kolga (Druce, 1887)
- Amusaron pruinosa (Grünberg, 1907)
- Vingerhoedtia grisea (Gaede, 1927)

== Brahmaeidae ==
- Dactyloceras bramarbas (Karsch, 1895)
- Dactyloceras karinae Bouyer, 2002
- Dactyloceras nebulosum Brosch, Naumann & Meister, 2002
- Dactyloceras ostentator Hering, 1927

== Copromorphidae ==
- Rhynchoferella simplex Strand, 1915

== Cosmopterigidae ==
- Allotalanta ochthotoma Meyrick, 1930
- Allotalanta tephroclystis Meyrick, 1930
- Cosmopterix athesiae Huemer & Koster, 2006
- Macrobathra neurocoma Meyrick, 1930

== Cossidae ==
- Phragmataecia pelostema (Hering, 1923)
- Xyleutes crassus Drury, ????

== Crambidae ==
- Aethaloessa floridalis (Zeller, 1852)
- Agathodes bibundalis Strand, 1913
- Argyractis tripunctalis (Snellen, 1872)
- Bocchoris inspersalis (Zeller, 1852)
- Bradina longipennis (Hampson, 1912)
- Bradina sordidalis (Dewitz, 1881)
- Cadarena sinuata (Fabricius, 1781)
- Cangetta primulina (Hampson, 1916)
- Cirrhochrista poecilocygnalis Strand, 1915
- Cirrhochrista quinquemaculalis Strand, 1915
- Cirrhochrista saltusalis Schaus, 1893
- Cnaphalocrocis poeyalis (Boisduval, 1833)
- Cotachena smaragdina (Butler, 1875)
- Diaphana indica (Saunders, 1851)
- Diasemiopsis ramburialis (Duponchel, 1834)
- Epipagis cancellalis (Zeller, 1852)
- Eporidia dariusalis Walker, 1859
- Eurrhyparodes bracteolalis (Zeller, 1852)
- Eurrhyparodes tricoloralis (Zeller, 1852)
- Filodes normalis Hampson, 1912
- Glyphodes stolalis Guenée, 1854
- Maruca vitrata (Fabricius, 1787)
- Noctuelita bicolorata Strand, 1915
- Omiodes indicata (Fabricius, 1775)
- Orphanostigma excisa (Martin, 1956)
- Palpita bonjongalis (Plötz, 1880)
- Parotis baldersalis (Walker, 1859)
- Phostria biguttata (Hampson, 1898)
- Phostria hesusalis (Walker, 1859)
- Phryganodes biguttata Hampson, 1898
- Pleuroptya balteata (Fabricius, 1798)
- Psara bipunctalis (Fabricius, 1794)
- Pseudonoorda distigmalis (Hampson, 1913)
- Pycnarmon diaphana (Cramer, 1779)
- Pyrausta marginepunctalis Gaede, 1916
- Pyrausta simialis (Gaede, 1916)
- Spoladea recurvalis (Fabricius, 1775)
- Stemorrhages sericea (Drury, 1773)
- Syllepte butlerii (Dewitz, 1881)
- Syllepte patagialis (Zeller, 1852)
- Udeoides bonakandaiensis Maes, 2006
- Ulopeza panaresalis (Walker, 1859)
- Viettessa bethalis (Viette, 1958)
- Zebronia phenice (Cramer, 1780)

== Drepanidae ==
- Callidrepana argyrobapta (Gaede, 1914)
- Callidrepana serena Watson, 1965
- Epicampoptera efulena Watson, 1965
- Epicampoptera heringi Gaede, 1927
- Epicampoptera lumaria Watson, 1965
- Epicampoptera marantica (Tams, 1930)
- Epicampoptera strandi Bryk, 1913
- Epicampoptera tumidula Watson, 1965
- Gonoreta contracta (Warren, 1897)
- Gonoreta differenciata (Bryk, 1913)
- Gonoreta gonioptera (Hampson, 1914)
- Gonoreta subtilis (Bryk, 1913)
- Isospidia angustipennis (Warren, 1904)
- Isospidia brunneola (Holland, 1893)
- Negera bimaculata (Holland, 1893)
- Negera clenchi Watson, 1965
- Negera confusa Walker, 1855
- Negera natalensis (Felder, 1874)
- Spidia excentrica Strand, 1912
- Spidia fenestrata Butler, 1878
- Spidia inangulata Watson, 1965
- Spidia rufinota Watson, 1965
- Spidia subviridis (Warren, 1899)
- Uranometra oculata (Holland, 1893)

== Elachistidae ==
- Cryptolechia bibundella (Strand, 1913)
- Elachista cordata Sruoga & J. de Prins, 2011
- Urodeta absidata Sruoga & J. de Prins, 2011
- Urodeta aculeata Sruoga & J. de Prins, 2011
- Urodeta crenata Sruoga & J. de Prins, 2011
- Urodeta cuspidis Sruoga & J. de Prins, 2011
- Urodeta faro Sruoga & J. de Prins, 2011
- Urodeta tortuosa Sruoga & J. de Prins, 2011

== Eriocottidae ==
- Compsoctena rustica (Strand, 1914)

== Eupterotidae ==
- Acrojana sciron (Druce, 1887)
- Acrojana scutaea Strand, 1909
- Camerunia orphne (Schaus, 1893)
- Epijana cosima (Plötz, 1880)
- Hoplojana rhodoptera (Gerstaecker, 1871)
- Jana eurymas Herrich-Schäffer, 1854
- Jana gracilis Walker, 1855
- Jana preciosa Aurivillius, 1893
- Jana strigina Westwood, 1849
- Janomima dannfelti (Aurivillius, 1893)
- Parajana gabunica (Aurivillius, 1892)
- Phiala albida Plötz, 1880
- Phiala cunina Cramer, 1780
- Phiala pseudatomaria Strand, 1911
- Phiala specialis Kühne, 2007
- Stenoglene citrinus (Druce, 1886)
- Stenoglene dehanicus (Strand, 1911)
- Stenoglene opalina Druce, 1910
- Stenoglene pellucida Joicey & Talbot, 1924
- Stenoglene preussi (Aurivillius, 1893)
- Stenoglene thelda (Druce, 1887)

== Gelechiidae ==
- Prasodryas acratopa Meyrick
- Ptilothyris climacista Meyrick, 1926

== Geometridae ==
- Acrostatheusis sanaga Herbulot, 1991
- Agathia multiscripta Warren, 1898
- Aletis helcita (Linnaeus, 1763)
- Antharmostes dargei Herbulot, 1982
- Antharmostes reducta Herbulot, 1996
- Antharmostes sufflata Herbulot, 1982
- Archichlora epicydra Prout, 1938
- Archichlora jacksoni Carcasson, 1971
- Asthenotricha amblycoma Prout, 1935
- Asthenotricha pycnoconia Janse, 1933
- Asthenotricha semidivisa Warren, 1901
- Bathycolpodes bassa Herbulot, 1986
- Bathycolpodes holochroa Prout, 1915
- Bathycolpodes melanceuthes Prout, 1922
- Bathycolpodes pectinata Herbulot, 1992
- Bathycolpodes torniflorata Prout, 1917
- Biston abruptaria (Walker, 1869)
- Biston antecreta (Prout, 1938)
- Biston dargei (Herbulot, 1973)
- Biston johannaria (Oberthür, 1913)
- Biston subocularia (Mabille, 1893)
- Cartaletis forbesi (Druce, 1884)
- Cartaletis gracilis (Möschler, 1887)
- Cartaletis sapor (Druce, 1910)
- Chiasmia albivia (Prout, 1915)
- Chiasmia collaxata (Herbulot, 1987)
- Chiasmia normata (Walker, 1861)
- Chiasmia percnoptera (Prout, 1915)
- Chiasmia sororcula (Warren, 1897)
- Chiasmia umbrata (Warren, 1897)
- Chlorodrepana aequisecta Prout, 1922
- Chrysocraspeda heringi Prout, 1932
- Cleora acaciaria (Boisduval, 1833)
- Cleora pavlitzkiae (D. S. Fletcher, 1958)
- Cleora rostella D. S. Fletcher, 1967
- Cleora rothkirchi (Strand, 1914)
- Cleora tulbaghata (Felder & Rogenhofer, 1875)
- Collix foraminata Guenée, 1858
- Colocleora derennei Herbulot, 1975
- Colocleora linearis Herbulot, 1985
- Colocleora potaenia (Prout, 1915)
- Colocleora sanghana Herbulot, 1985
- Colocleora smithi (Warren, 1904)
- Comibaena barnsi Prout, 1930
- Comostolopsis rubristicta (Warren, 1899)
- Comostolopsis stillata (Felder & Rogenhofer, 1875)
- Conolophia persimilis (Warren, 1905)
- Cyclophora diplosticta (Prout, 1918)
- Derambila punctisignata Walker, 1863
- Derambila thearia (Swinhoe, 1904)
- Dioptrochasma aino Bryk, 1913
- Dioptrochasma homochroa (Holland, 1893)
- Dithecodes ornithospila (Prout, 1911)
- Dualana veniliformis Strand, 1914
- Dysnymphus monostigma Prout, 1915
- Ecpetala camerunica Herbulot, 1988
- Ecpetala carnifasciata (Warren, 1899)
- Epigynopteryx flavedinaria (Guenée, 1857)
- Epigynopteryx flexa Prout, 1931
- Epigynopteryx molochina Herbulot, 1984
- Epigynopteryx tabitha Warren, 1901
- Episteira atrospila (Strand, 1915)
- Erastria albosignata (Walker, 1863)
- Ereunetea minor (Holland, 1893)
- Ereunetea translucens Prout, 1934
- Eupithecia candicans Herbulot, 1988
- Eupithecia celatisigna (Warren, 1902)
- Eupithecia devestita (Warren, 1899)
- Eupithecia dilucida (Warren, 1899)
- Eupithecia dohertyi Prout, 1935
- Eupithecia multispinata D. S. Fletcher, 1951
- Eupithecia nigribasis (Warren, 1902)
- Eupithecia steeleae D. S. Fletcher, 1951
- Gelasmodes fasciata (Warren, 1899)
- Geodena barombica Strand, 1911
- Geodena hintzi Strand, 1915
- Geolyces attesaria Walker, 1860
- Geolyces tanytmesis Prout, 1934
- Gymnoscelis bassa Herbulot, 1981
- Hispophora amica (Prout, 1915)
- Horisme pallidimacula Prout, 1925
- Hyalornis docta (Schaus & Clements, 1893)
- Hyalornis livida Herbulot, 1973
- Hylemeridia eurema (Plötz, 1880)
- Hypochrosis banakaria (Plötz, 1880)
- Hypochrosis euphyes Prout, 1915
- Hypocoela turpisaria (Swinhoe, 1904)
- Hypomecis nessa Herbulot, 1995
- Hypomecis quaerenda Herbulot, 2000
- Idiodes flexilinea (Warren, 1898)
- Idiodes pectinata (Herbulot, 1966)
- Klinzigidia dithecodes Herbulot, 1982
- Lophorrhachia mutanda Herbulot, 1983
- Macropitthea massagaria (Karsch, 1895)
- Megadrepana cinerea Holland, 1893
- Melinoessa amplissimata (Walker, 1863)
- Melinoessa asteria Prout, 1934
- Melinoessa croesaria Herrich-Schäffer, 1855
- Melinoessa eurycrossa Prout, 1934
- Melinoessa horni Prout, 1922
- Melinoessa midas Prout, 1922
- Menophra bilobata Herbulot, 1995
- Menophra dnophera (Prout, 1915)
- Metallochlora camerunica Herbulot, 1982
- Metallochlora melanopis Prout, 1915
- Miantochora picturata Herbulot, 1985
- Microlyces bassa Herbulot, 1981
- Mimaletis landbecki (Druce, 1910)
- Narthecusa tenuiorata Walker, 1862
- Nothylemera neaera (Druce, 1887)
- Omphalucha brunnea (Warren, 1899)
- Oxyfidonia monoderctes Prout, 1915
- Phaiogramma faustinata (Millière, 1868)
- Piercia ansorgei (Bethune-Baker, 1913)
- Piercia myopteryx Prout, 1935
- Pigiopsis hyposcotia Prout, 1915
- Pigiopsis scotoides Prout, 1915
- Pingasa distensaria (Walker, 1860)
- Pingasa nigrolineata Karisch, 2006
- Pitthea continua Walker, 1854
- Pitthea eximia Druce, 1910
- Pitthea famula Drury, 1773
- Pitthea flavimargo Druce, 1910
- Pitthea mungi Plötz, 1880
- Prasinocyma bamenda Herbulot, 1982
- Prasinocyma gemmatimargo Prout, 1915
- Prasinocyma nigripunctata (Warren, 1897)
- Prasinocyma permagna Herbulot, 1982
- Prasinocyma rugistrigula Prout, 1912
- Prasinocyma trifilifimbria Prout, 1915
- Protosteira spectabilis (Warren, 1899)
- Pseudhemithea exomila Prout, 1917
- Pseudolarentia megalaria (Guenée, 1858)
- Psilocerea pulverosa (Warren, 1894)
- Psilocladia repudiosa (Prout, 1915)
- Racotis angulosa Herbulot, 1973
- Racotis zebrina Warren, 1899
- Scopula anoista (Prout, 1915)
- Scopula batesi Prout, 1932
- Scopula fuscobrunnea (Warren, 1901)
- Scopula jejuna Prout, 1932
- Scopula laevipennis (Warren, 1897)
- Scopula macrocelis (Prout, 1915)
- Scopula obliquifascia Herbulot, 1999
- Scopula rectisecta Prout, 1920
- Scopula recurvata Herbulot, 1992
- Scopula subperlaria (Warren, 1897)
- Scopula toxophora Prout, 1919
- Somatina syneorus Prout, 1915
- Terina charmione (Fabricius, 1793)
- Terina circumdata Walker, 1865
- Terina doleris (Plötz, 1880)
- Terina ochricosta Rebel, 1914
- Terina octogesa (Druce, 1887)
- Traminda drepanodes Prout, 1915
- Trimetopia aetheraria Guenée, 1858
- Unnamed genus Ennominae cyrtogramma (Prout, 1915)
- Victoria taminata Herbulot, 1982
- Xanthisthisa extrema Herbulot, 1999
- Xanthisthisa tarsispina (Warren, 1901)
- Xanthorhoe ansorgei (Warren, 1899)
- Xanthorhoe exorista Prout, 1922
- Xanthorhoe heliopharia (Swinhoe, 1904)
- Xanthorhoe pseudognathos Herbulot, 1981
- Xanthorhoe tamsi D. S. Fletcher, 1963
- Xanthorhoe transjugata Prout, 1923
- Xanthorhoe trientata (Warren, 1901)
- Xenimpia chalepa Prout, 1915
- Xenochroma angulosa Herbulot, 1984
- Xylopteryx amieti Herbulot, 1973
- Xylopteryx dargei Herbulot, 1984
- Xylopteryx elongata Herbulot, 1984
- Xylopteryx lemairei Herbulot, 1984
- Zamarada aclys D. S. Fletcher, 1974
- Zamarada acrochra Prout, 1928
- Zamarada adumbrata D. S. Fletcher, 1974
- Zamarada aerata D. S. Fletcher, 1974
- Zamarada aglae Oberthür, 1912
- Zamarada antimima D. S. Fletcher, 1974
- Zamarada apicata Herbulot, 1983
- Zamarada ariste D. S. Fletcher, 1974
- Zamarada astales D. S. Fletcher, 1974
- Zamarada auratisquama Warren, 1897
- Zamarada aurolineata Gaede, 1915
- Zamarada azona Herbulot, 1983
- Zamarada bastelbergeri Gaede, 1915
- Zamarada bernardii D. S. Fletcher, 1974
- Zamarada bicuspida D. S. Fletcher, 1974
- Zamarada bonaberiensis Strand, 1915
- Zamarada cathetus D. S. Fletcher, 1974
- Zamarada catori Bethune-Baker, 1913
- Zamarada clavigera D. S. Fletcher, 1974
- Zamarada clementi Herbulot, 1975
- Zamarada clenchi D. S. Fletcher, 1974
- Zamarada clio Oberthür, 1912
- Zamarada consummata D. S. Fletcher, 1974
- Zamarada corroborata Herbulot, 1954
- Zamarada corymbophora D. S. Fletcher, 1974
- Zamarada crenulata D. S. Fletcher, 1974
- Zamarada crystallophana Mabille, 1900
- Zamarada cucharita D. S. Fletcher, 1974
- Zamarada cydippe Herbulot, 1954
- Zamarada dentigera Warren, 1909
- Zamarada dialitha D. S. Fletcher, 1974
- Zamarada dilata D. S. Fletcher, 1974
- Zamarada dilucida Warren, 1909
- Zamarada dolorosa D. S. Fletcher, 1974
- Zamarada dyscapna D. S. Fletcher, 1974
- Zamarada emaciata D. S. Fletcher, 1974
- Zamarada episema D. S. Fletcher, 1974
- Zamarada erato Oberthür, 1912
- Zamarada erosa D. S. Fletcher, 1974
- Zamarada eryma D. S. Fletcher, 1974
- Zamarada euerces Prout, 1928
- Zamarada euphrosyne Oberthür, 1912
- Zamarada excavata Bethune-Baker, 1913
- Zamarada ferruginata D. S. Fletcher, 1974
- Zamarada flavicosta Warren, 1897
- Zamarada fumosa Gaede, 1915
- Zamarada fusticula D. S. Fletcher, 1974
- Zamarada gaedei D. S. Fletcher, 1974
- Zamarada griseola D. S. Fletcher, 1974
- Zamarada herbuloti D. S. Fletcher, 1974
- Zamarada hero D. S. Fletcher, 1974
- Zamarada ignicosta Prout, 1912
- Zamarada ilaria Swinhoe, 1904
- Zamarada incompta D. S. Fletcher, 1974
- Zamarada ixiaria Swinhoe, 1904
- Zamarada kala Herbulot, 1975
- Zamarada labifera Prout, 1915
- Zamarada latimargo Warren, 1897
- Zamarada lepta D. S. Fletcher, 1974
- Zamarada melanopyga Herbulot, 1954
- Zamarada melpomene Oberthür, 1912
- Zamarada mimesis D. S. Fletcher, 1974
- Zamarada montana Herbulot, 1979
- Zamarada nasuta Warren, 1897
- Zamarada nigrapex Herbulot, 1981
- Zamarada odontis Pierre-Baltus, 2000
- Zamarada opala Carcasson, 1964
- Zamarada ostracodes D. S. Fletcher, 1974
- Zamarada paxilla D. S. Fletcher, 1974
- Zamarada pelobasis D. S. Fletcher, 1974
- Zamarada phrontisaria Swinhoe, 1904
- Zamarada platycephala D. S. Fletcher, 1974
- Zamarada polyctemon Prout, 1932
- Zamarada pristis D. S. Fletcher, 1974
- Zamarada protrusa Warren, 1897
- Zamarada reflexaria (Walker, 1863)
- Zamarada rupta D. S. Fletcher, 1974
- Zamarada sagitta D. S. Fletcher, 1974
- Zamarada schalida D. S. Fletcher, 1974
- Zamarada sicula D. S. Fletcher, 1974
- Zamarada similis D. S. Fletcher, 1974
- Zamarada subincolaris Gaede, 1915
- Zamarada suda D. S. Fletcher, 1974
- Zamarada terpsichore Oberthür, 1912
- Zamarada thalia Oberthür, 1912
- Zamarada tortura D. S. Fletcher, 1974
- Zamarada triangularis Gaede, 1915
- Zamarada tricuspida D. S. Fletcher, 1974
- Zamarada tullia Oberthür, 1913
- Zamarada undimarginata Warren, 1897
- Zamarada urania Oberthür, 1912
- Zamarada variola D. S. Fletcher, 1974
- Zamarada vigilans Prout, 1915
- Zamarada volsella D. S. Fletcher, 1974
- Zamarada vulpina Warren, 1897
- Zamarada weberi D. S. Fletcher, 1974
- Zamarada xystra D. S. Fletcher, 1974

== Gracillariidae ==
- Acrocercops bifasciata (Walsingham, 1891)
- Cameraria fara de Prins, 2012
- Phyllonorycter farensis De Prins & De Prins, 2007
- Phyllonorycter gozmanyi De Prins & De Prins, 2007
- Phyllonorycter hibiscina (Vári, 1961)
- Porphyrosela desmodivora de Prins, 2012

== Himantopteridae ==
- Doratopteryx camerunica Hering, 1937

== Himantopteridae ==
- Pedoptila thaletes Druce, 1907

== Immidae ==
- Moca pelinactis (Meyrick, 1925)

== Lasiocampidae ==
- Anadiasa pseudometoides Tams, 1929
- Beralade bistrigata Strand, 1909
- Beralade unistriga Hering, 1928
- Bombycopsis indecora (Walker, 1865)
- Catalebeda discocellularis Strand, 1912
- Catalebeda elegans Aurivillius, 1925
- Cheligium choerocampoides (Holland, 1893)
- Cheligium licrisonia Zolotuhin & Gurkovich, 2009
- Cheligium lineatum (Aurivillius, 1893)
- Cheligium nigrescens (Aurivillius, 1909)
- Cheligium pinheyi Zolotuhin & Gurkovich, 2009
- Chionopsyche admirabile Zolotuhin, 2010
- Chrysopsyche mirifica (Butler, 1878)
- Chrysopsyche yaundae Bethune-Baker, 1927
- Cleopatrina bilinea (Walker, 1855)
- Cleopatrina phocea (Druce, 1887)
- Epicnapteroides lobata Strand, 1912
- Eucraera minor (Gaede, 1915)
- Euphorea ondulosa (Conte, 1909)
- Filiola dogma Zolotuhin & Gurkovich, 2009
- Filiola lanceolata (Hering, 1932)
- Filiola occidentale (Strand, 1912)
- Gonobombyx angulata Aurivillius, 1893
- Gonometa nysa Druce, 1887
- Gonometa rufobrunnea Aurivillius, 1922
- Gonometa sjostedti Aurivillius, 1892
- Gonopacha brotoessa (Holland, 1893)
- Grellada imitans (Aurivillius, 1893)
- Lechriolepis basirufa Strand, 1912
- Lechriolepis nigrivenis Strand, 1912
- Lechriolepis tessmanni Strand, 1912
- Leipoxais alazon Hering, 1928
- Leipoxais batesi Bethune-Baker, 1927
- Leipoxais castanea Tams, 1929
- Leipoxais dysaresta Hering, 1928
- Leipoxais hapsimachus Hering, 1928
- Leipoxais miara Hering, 1928
- Leipoxais peraffinis Holland, 1893
- Leipoxais proboscidea (Guérin-Méneville, 1832)
- Leipoxais regularis Strand, 1912
- Leipoxais rufobrunnea Strand, 1912
- Leipoxais siccifolia Aurivillius, 1902
- Mallocampa alenica Strand, 1912
- Mallocampa audea (Druce, 1887)
- Mallocampa jaensis Bethune-Baker, 1927
- Mallocampa punctilimbata Strand, 1912
- Mallocampa schultzei Aurivillius
- Metajana chanleri Holland, 1896
- Mimopacha cinerascens (Holland, 1893)
- Mimopacha gerstaeckerii (Dewitz, 1881)
- Mimopacha knoblauchii (Dewitz, 1881)
- Mimopacha pelodis Hering, 1928
- Morongea arnoldi (Aurivillius, 1909)
- Morongea avoniffi (Tams, 1929)
- Morongea flavipicta (Tams, 1929)
- Morongea lampara Zolotuhin & Prozorov, 2010
- Muzunguja rectilineata (Aurivillius, 1900)
- Nepehria electrophaea (Tams, 1929)
- Nepehria olivia Gurkovich & Zolotuhin, 2010
- Odontocheilopteryx conzolia Gurkovich & Zolotuhin, 2009
- Odontocheilopteryx haribda Gurkovich & Zolotuhin, 2009
- Odontocheilopteryx similis Tams, 1929
- Odontopacha phaula Tams, 1929
- Odontopacha spissa Tams, 1929
- Opisthodontia tessmanni Hering, 1928
- Oplometa cassandra (Druce, 1887)
- Pachymeta contraria (Walker, 1855)
- Pachymetana carnegiei (Tams, 1829)
- Pachymetana custodita (Strand, 1912)
- Pachymetana niveoplaga (Aurivillius, 1900)
- Pachymetoides strandi (Tams, 1929)
- Pachyna bogema Zolotuhin & Gurkovich, 2009
- Pachyna subfascia (Walker, 1855)
- Pachytrina crestalina Zolotuhin & Gurkovich, 2009
- Pachytrina elygara Zolotuhin & Gurkovich, 2009
- Pachytrina honrathii (Dewitz, 1881)
- Pachytrina okzilina Zolotuhin & Gurkovich, 2009
- Pachytrina philargyria (Hering, 1928)
- Pachytrina rubra (Tams, 1929)
- Pallastica lateritia (Hering, 1928)
- Pallastica mesoleuca (Strand, 1911)
- Philotherma sordida Aurivillius, 1905
- Philotherma spargata (Holland, 1893)
- Pseudolyra divisa Aurivillius, ????
- Pseudometa concava (Strand, 1912)
- Pseudometa pagetodes Tams, 1929
- Pseudometa punctipennis (Strand, 1912)
- Pseudometa schultzei Aurivillius, 1905
- Pseudometa thysanodicha Tams, 1929
- Sonitha bernardii Zolotuhin & Prozorov, 2010
- Sonitha libera (Aurivillius, 1914)
- Stenophatna hollandi (Tams, 1929)
- Stenophatna kahli (Tams, 1929)
- Stoermeriana camerunicum (Aurivillius, 1902)
- Stoermeriana flavimaculata Tams, 1929
- Stoermeriana graberi (Dewitz, 1881)
- Stoermeriana ocellata Tams, 1929
- Stoermeriana singulare (Aurivillius, 1893)
- Stoermeriana sjostedti (Aurivillius, 1902)
- Stoermeriana superba (Aurivillius, 1908)
- Stoermeriana vinacea Tams, 1929
- Streblote nyassanum (Strand, 1912)
- Streblote panda Hübner, 1822
- Streblote splendens (Druce, 1887)
- Streblote vesta (Druce, 1887)
- Theophasida obusta (Tams, 1929)
- Theophasida superba (Aurivillius, 1914)
- Trabala burchardi (Dewitz, 1881)
- Trabala charon Druce, 1910

== Limacodidae ==
- Andaingo melampepla (Holland, 1893)
- Andaingo rufivena (Hering, 1928)
- Anilina plebeia (Karsch, 1899)
- Apreptophanes stevensoni Janse, 1964
- Baria elsa (Druce, 1887)
- Birthama dodona Druce, 1910
- Brachiopsis conjunctoides Hering, 1933
- Casphalia extranea (Walker, 1869)
- Chrysopoloma nigrociliata Aurivillius, 1905
- Chrysopoloma opalina Druce, 1910
- Compactena hilda (Druce, 1887)
- Cosuma rugosa Walker, 1855
- Ctenolita anacompa Karsch, 1896
- Ctenolita argyrobapta Karsch, 1899
- Ctenolita chrostisa Karsch, 1896
- Delorhachis viridiplaga Karsch, 1896
- Hadraphe aprica Karsch, 1899
- Latoia cretata (Karsch, 1899)
- Latoia urda (Druce, 1887)
- Latoia vitilena (Karsch, 1896)
- Natada julia Druce, 1887
- Natada undina Druce, 1887
- Niphadolepis afflicta Hering, 1928
- Niphadolepis improba Hering, 1928
- Parasa carnapi Karsch, 1899
- Parasa trapezoidea Aurivillius, 1900
- Parasa viridissima Holland, 1893
- Prolatoia sjostedti (Aurivillius, 1897)
- Scotinochroa fulgorifera Hering, 1928
- Semyrilla lineata (Holland, 1893)
- Sporetolepis subpellucens Karsch, 1899
- Sporetolepis venusta Hering, 1928
- Stroter capillatus Karsch, 1899
- Stroter comatus Karsch, 1899
- Trachyptena nigromaculata Hering, 1928

== Lymantriidae ==
- Abynotha preussi (Mabille & Vuillot, 1892)
- Aclonophlebia diffusa Hering, 1926
- Aclonophlebia ganymedes Hering, 1926
- Argyrostagma niobe (Weymer, 1896)
- Aroa discalis Walker, 1855
- Aroa yokoae Bethune-Baker, 1927
- Barobata trocta Karsch, 1895
- Batella muscosa (Holland, 1893)
- Conigephyra citrona (Hering, 1926)
- Creagra albina (Plötz, 1880)
- Creagra liturata (Guérin-Méneville, 1844)
- Crorema mentiens Walker, 1855
- Dasychira albiapex Hering, 1926
- Dasychira albilinea (Holland, 1893)
- Dasychira albilunulata (Karsch, 1895)
- Dasychira albinotata (Holland, 1893)
- Dasychira antica (Walker, 1855)
- Dasychira basilinea Hering, 1926
- Dasychira bimaculata Aurivillius, 1926
- Dasychira brunneicosta (Holland, 1893)
- Dasychira caeca (Plötz, 1880)
- Dasychira castor Hering, 1926
- Dasychira chilophaea Hering, 1926
- Dasychira citana (Schaus & Clements, 1893)
- Dasychira coeruleifascia (Holland, 1893)
- Dasychira delicata (Holland, 1893)
- Dasychira deplagiata Hering, 1926
- Dasychira endophaea Hampson, 1910
- Dasychira gonophora (Holland, 1893)
- Dasychira goodii (Holland, 1893)
- Dasychira heringiana Bryk, 1935
- Dasychira hypocrita Hering, 1926
- Dasychira laeliopsis Hering, 1926
- Dasychira loxogramma Hering, 1926
- Dasychira melanoproctis Hering, 1926
- Dasychira multilinea Hering, 1926
- Dasychira ocellata (Holland, 1893)
- Dasychira ocellifera (Holland, 1893)
- Dasychira orphnina Hering, 1926
- Dasychira pennatula (Fabricius, 1793)
- Dasychira ploetzi Hering, 1926
- Dasychira poecila Hering, 1926
- Dasychira pollux Hering, 1926
- Dasychira proletaria (Holland, 1893)
- Dasychira prospera Hering, 1926
- Dasychira pulchripes Aurivillius, 1904
- Dasychira rhopalum Hering, 1926
- Dasychira rubricosta Hering, 1926
- Dasychira ruptilinea Holland, 1893
- Dasychira saussurii Dewitz, 1881
- Dasychira spargata Hering, 1926
- Dasychira sphalera Hering, 1926
- Dasychira sphaleroides Hering, 1926
- Dasychira symbolum Hering, 1926
- Dasychira violacea Hering, 1926
- Dasychira xylopoecila Hering, 1926
- Eudasychira calliprepes (Collenette, 1933)
- Euproctilla disjuncta Aurivillius, 1904
- Euproctilla insignis Aurivillius, 1904
- Euproctilla satyrus Hering, 1926
- Euproctilla tesselata (Holland, 1893)
- Euproctillina mesomelaena (Holland, 1893)
- Euproctillopsis affinis Hering, 1926
- Euproctis apicipuncta (Holland, 1893)
- Euproctis bigutta Holland, 1893
- Euproctis dewitzi (Grünberg, 1907)
- Euproctis kamerunica Hering, 1926
- Euproctis lyonia Swinhoe, 1904
- Euproctis melaleuca (Holland, 1893)
- Euproctis mima Strand, 1912
- Euproctis molunduana Aurivillius, 1925
- Euproctis parallela (Holland, 1893)
- Euproctis plagiata (Walker, 1855)
- Euproctis pygmaea (Walker, 1855)
- Euproctis rivularis Gaede, 1916
- Euproctis rubroguttata Aurivillius, 1904
- Euproctis sjoestedti Aurivillius, 1904
- Euproctis vagans (Hering, 1926)
- Grammoa striata Aurivillius, 1904
- Heteronygmia flavescens Holland, 1893
- Heteronygmia manicata (Aurivillius, 1892)
- Kintana ocellatula (Hering, 1926)
- Lacipa robusta Hering, 1926
- Laelia batoides Plötz, 1880
- Laelia bonaberiensis (Strand, 1915)
- Laelia danva (Schaus & Clements, 1893)
- Laelia diascia Hampson, 1905
- Laelia extorta (Distant, 1897)
- Laelia fracta Schaus & Clements, 1893
- Laelia fusca (Walker, 1855)
- Laelia gigantea Hampson, 1910
- Laelia mediofasciata (Hering, 1926)
- Laelia mesoxantha Hering, 1926
- Laelia nubifuga (Holland, 1893)
- Laelia pheosia (Hampson, 1910)
- Laelia protecta Hering, 1926
- Laelia stigmatica (Holland, 1893)
- Laelia thanatos (Hering, 1926)
- Leucoma parva (Plötz, 1880)
- Leucoma purissima (Hering, 1926)
- Leucoma xanthocephala (Hering, 1926)
- Leucoperina kahli (Holland, 1893)
- Liparodonta convexa Hering, 1927
- Lomadonta erythrina Holland, 1893
- Lomadonta hoesemanni Bryk, 1913
- Lomadonta umbrata Bryk, 1913
- Lymantria rubroviridis Hering, 1927
- Lymantria vacillans Walker, 1855
- Marblepsis dolosa Hering, 1926
- Marblepsis niveola Hering, 1926
- Mylantria xanthospila (Plötz, 1880)
- Naroma signifera Walker, 1856
- Naroma varipes (Walker, 1865)
- Neomardara africana (Holland, 1893)
- Olene basalis (Walker, 1855)
- Otroeda hesperia (Cramer, 1779)
- Otroeda nerina (Drury, 1780)
- Otroeda permagnifica Holland, 1893
- Paqueta chloroscia (Hering, 1926)
- Paramarbla elegantula (Hering, 1926)
- Paramarbla indentata (Holland, 1893)
- Pirga mirabilis (Aurivillius, 1891)
- Pirgula octoguttata Tessmann, 1921
- Porthesaroa lacipa Hering, 1926
- Porthesaroa noctua Hering, 1926
- Pteredoa nigropuncta Hering, 1926
- Rahona ladburyi (Bethune-Baker, 1911)
- Rahona seitzi (Hering, 1926)
- Stracena bananoides (Hering, 1927)
- Stracena fuscivena Swinhoe, 1903
- Stracena promelaena (Holland, 1893)
- Stracena sulphureivena (Aurivillius, 1905)
- Stracena tavetensis (Holland, 1892)
- Synogdoa simplex Aurivillius, 1904
- Tamsita ochthoeba (Hampson, 1920)
- Terphothrix lanaria Holland, 1893
- Terphothrix tenuis (Holland, 1893)
- Usimbara lata (Holland, 1893)
- Viridichira cameruna (Aurivillius, 1904)
- Viridichirana chlorophila (Hering, 1926)

== Metarbelidae ==
- Haberlandia hilaryae Lehmann, 2011
- Haberlandia hintzi (Grünberg, 1911)
- Kroonia adamauensis Lehmann, 2010
- Lebedodes clathratus Grünberg, 1911
- Lebedodes fraterna Gaede, 1929
- Lebedodes schaeferi Grünberg, 1911
- Metarbela bueana Strand, 1912
- Metarbela rava Karsch, 1896
- Metarbela reticulosana Strand, 1913
- Metarbela rufa Gaede, 1929
- Metarbela triguttata Aurivillius, 1905
- Ortharbela castanea Gaede, 1929
- Ortharbela semifasciata Gaede, 1929
- Teragra clarior Gaede, 1929

== Noctuidae ==
- Achaea catocaloides Guenée, 1852
- Achaea cyanobathra L. B. Prout, 1919
- Achaea cymatias L. B. Prout, 1919
- Achaea leucopera Druce, 1912
- Achaea lienardi (Boisduval, 1833)
- Achaea poliopasta Hampson, 1913
- Achaea rothkirchi (Strand, 1914)
- Acontia apatelia (Swinhoe, 1907)
- Acontia basifera Walker, 1857
- Acontia briola Holland, 1894
- Acontia callima Bethune-Baker, 1911
- Acontia hemiselenias (Hampson, 1918)
- Acontia imitatrix Wallengren, 1856
- Acontia insocia (Walker, 1857)
- Acontia transfigurata Wallengren, 1856
- Acontia wahlbergi Wallengren, 1856
- Aegocera fervida (Walker, 1854)
- Aegocera obliqua Mabille, 1893
- Aegocera tigrina (Druce, 1882)
- Agnomonia orontes Plötz, 1880
- Amyna axis Guenée, 1852
- Amyna rubrirena Hampson, 1918
- Andobana multipunctata (Druce, 1899)
- Anomis erosa (Hübner, 1818)
- Anticarsia rubricans (Boisduval, 1833)
- Asota speciosa (Drury, 1773)
- Audea melaleuca Walker, 1865
- Audea paulumnodosa Kühne, 2005
- Bareia incidens Walker, 1858
- Bertulania corticea Strand, 1914
- Brachyherca saphobasis Hampson, 1926
- Busseola convexilimba Strand, 1912
- Caligatus angasii Wing, 1850
- Carpostalagma viridis (Plötz, 1880)
- Caryonopera breviramia Hampson, 1926
- Catephia squamosa (Wallengren, 1856)
- Chrysodeixis chalcites (Esper, 1789)
- Colbusa euclidica Walker, 1865
- Conservula alambica Gaede, 1915
- Crameria amabilis (Drury, 1773)
- Cyligramma amblyops Mabille, 1891
- Cyligramma latona (Cramer, 1775)
- Cyligramma limacina (Guérin-Méneville, 1832)
- Dysgonia adunca (L. B. Prout, 1919)
- Dysgonia angularis (Boisduval, 1833)
- Dysgonia humilis Holland, 1894
- Dysgonia isotima (L. B. Prout, 1919)
- Dysgonia pudica (Möschler, 1887)
- Egnasia rufifusalis Hampson, 1926
- Enmonodiops ochrodiscata Hampson, 1926
- Erebus macrops (Linnaeus, 1767)
- Eucampima poliostidza Hampson, 1926
- Eudocima divitiosa (Walker, 1869)
- Eudocima fullonia (Clerck, 1764)
- Eudocima materna (Linnaeus, 1767)
- Eutelia endoleuca (Hampson, 1918)
- Eutornoptera endosticta Hampson, 1926
- Facidia vacillans (Walker, 1858)
- Feliniopsis africana (Schaus & Clements, 1893)
- Feliniopsis confusa (Laporte, 1973)
- Feliniopsis connivens (Felder & Rogenhofer, 1874)
- Feliniopsis duponti (Laporte, 1974)
- Feliniopsis grisea (Laporte, 1973)
- Feliniopsis gueneei (Laporte, 1973)
- Feliniopsis hosplitoides (Laporte, 1979)
- Feliniopsis kobesi Hacker & Fibiger, 2007
- Feliniopsis laportei Hacker & Fibiger, 2007
- Feliniopsis legraini Hacker & Fibiger, 2007
- Feliniopsis ligniensis (Laporte, 1973)
- Feliniopsis politzari Hacker & Fibiger, 2007
- Feliniopsis satellitis (Berio, 1974)
- Focillopis eclipsia Hampson, 1926
- Gesonia obeditalis Walker, 1859
- Godasa sidae (Fabricius, 1793)
- Gracilodes disticha Hampson, 1926
- Gracilodes metopis Hampson, 1926
- Heliophisma catocalina Holland, 1894
- Heliophisma klugii (Boisduval, 1833)
- Heraclia aemulatrix (Westwood, 1881)
- Heraclia buchholzi (Plötz, 1880)
- Heraclia hornimani (Druce, 1880)
- Heraclia karschi (Holland, 1897)
- Heraclia longipennis (Walker, 1854)
- Heraclia medeba (Druce, 1880)
- Heraclia nigridorsa (Mabille, 1890)
- Heraclia pallida (Walker, 1854)
- Heraclia poggei (Dewitz, 1879)
- Heraclia zenkeri (Karsch, 1895)
- Homodina argentifera Hampson, 1926
- Hypocala gaedei Berio, 1955
- Hypotuerta transiens (Hampson, 1901)
- Lithacodia blandula (Guenée, 1862)
- Lobophyllodes miniatus (Grünberg, 1907)
- Lophoptera semirufa Druce, 1911
- Marcipa accentifera Pelletier, 1975
- Marcipa aequatorialis Pelletier, 1975
- Marcipa argyrosema Hampson, 1926
- Marcipa douala Pelletier, 1975
- Marcipa kirdii Pelletier, 1975
- Marcipa maculiferoides (Strand, 1914)
- Marcipa mariaeclarae Pelletier, 1975
- Marcipa viettei Pelletier, 1975
- Marcipalina clenchi (Pelletier, 1975)
- Marcipalina laportei (Pelletier, 1975)
- Marcipalina triangulifera (Holland, 1894)
- Marcipalina violacea (Pelletier, 1974)
- Masalia cheesmanae Seymour, 1972
- Masalia galatheae (Wallengren, 1856)
- Massaga hesparia (Cramer, 1775)
- Massaga maritona Butler, 1868
- Massaga monteirona Butler, 1874
- Massaga xenia (Jordan, 1913)
- Maxera brachypecten Hampson, 1926
- Maxera euryptera Hampson, 1926
- Mazuca strigicincta Walker, 1866
- Mentaxya albifrons (Geyer, 1837)
- Metagarista maenas (Herrich-Schäffer, 1853)
- Metagarista triphaenoides Walker, 1854
- Misa cosmetica Karsch, 1898
- Misa memnonia Karsch, 1895
- Mocis frugalis (Fabricius, 1775)
- Mocis mayeri (Boisduval, 1833)
- Mocis repanda (Fabricius, 1794)
- Mocis undata (Fabricius, 1775)
- Ochropleura rufulana (Laporte, 1973)
- Omphaloceps triangularis (Mabille, 1893)
- Ophiusa tettensis (Hopffer, 1857)
- Ophiusa violisparsa (L. B. Prout, 1919)
- Oruza divisa (Walker, 1862)
- Ovios capensis (Herrich-Schäffer, 1854)
- Ozarba domina (Holland, 1894)
- Ozarba heliastis (Hampson, 1902)
- Ozarba heringi Berio, 1940
- Pangrapta camerunia Hampson, 1926
- Pangrapta eucraspeda Hampson, 1926
- Parachalciope benitensis (Holland, 1894)
- Paralephana bisignata Hampson, 1926
- Paralephana curvilinea Hampson, 1926
- Paralephana mesoscia Hampson, 1926
- Paralephana monogona Hampson, 1926
- Paralephana rectilinea Hampson, 1926
- Phaegorista bicurvata Gaede, 1926
- Phaegorista rubriventris Aurivillius, 1925
- Phaegorista similis Walker, 1869
- Phytometra duplicalis (Walker, 1866)
- Polydesma umbricola Boisduval, 1833
- Sarothroceras banaka (Plötz, 1880)
- Scambina roseipicta (Druce, 1911)
- Soloe trigutta Walker, 1854
- Soloella guttivaga (Walker, 1854)
- Tatorinia pallidipennis Hampson, 1926
- Tavia polycyma Hampson, 1926
- Thiacidas berenice (Fawcett, 1916)
- Thiacidas juvenis Hacker & Zilli, 2007
- Thiacidas legraini Hacker & Zilli, 2007
- Thiacidas mukim (Berio, 1977)
- Thiacidas schausi (Hampson, 1905)
- Tolna chionopera (Druce, 1912)
- Tolna versicolor Walker, 1869
- Tracheplexia altitudinis Laporte, 1978
- Tracheplexia occidentalis Laporte, 1973
- Tracheplexia sylvestris Laporte, 1978
- Trigonodes hyppasia (Cramer, 1779)
- Trisulopsis clathrata Grünberg, 1907
- Tuerta chrysochlora Walker, 1869

== Nolidae ==
- Eligma duplicata Aurivillius, 1892
- Eligma hypsoides (Walker, 1869)
- Goniocalpe leucotrigona Hampson, 1918
- Leocyma camilla (Druce, 1887)
- Maurilia heterochroa Hampson, 1905
- Negeta albiplagiata Hampson, 1918
- Negeta mesoleuca (Holland, 1894)
- Westermannia monticola Strand, 1913

== Notodontidae ==
- Afrocerura cameroona (Bethune-Baker, 1927)
- Anaphe panda (Boisduval, 1847)
- Anaphe venata Butler, 1878
- Andocidia tabernaria Kiriakoff, 1958
- Antheua bossumensis (Gaede, 1915)
- Antheua rufovittata (Aurivillius, 1901)
- Antheua simplex Walker, 1855
- Atrasana rectilinea (Gaede, 1928)
- Belisaria camerunica Kiriakoff, 1965
- Bisolita strigata (Aurivillius, 1906)
- Boscawenia latifasciata (Gaede, 1928)
- Brachychira davus Kiriakoff, 1965
- Brachychira ferruginea Aurivillius, 1905
- Catarctia biseriata (Plötz, 1880)
- Cerurina marshalli (Hampson, 1910)
- Chlorocalliope rivata (Hampson, 1910)
- Chlorochadisra viridipulverea (Gaede, 1928)
- Clostera vumba Kiriakoff, 1981
- Crestonica circulosa (Gaede, 1928)
- Daulopaectes trichosa (Hampson, 1910)
- Deinarchia apateloides (Holland, 1893)
- Desmeocraera albicans Gaede, 1928
- Desmeocraera brunneicosta Gaede, 1928
- Desmeocraera chloeropsis (Holland, 1893)
- Desmeocraera falsa (Holland, 1893)
- Desmeocraera ferevaria Kiriakoff, 1958
- Desmeocraera glauca Gaede, 1928
- Desmeocraera imploratrix Kiriakoff, 1958
- Desmeocraera inquisitrix Kiriakoff, 1958
- Desmeocraera latex (Druce, 1901)
- Desmeocraera latifasciata Gaede, 1928
- Desmeocraera leucophaea Gaede, 1928
- Desmeocraera leucosticta (Hampson, 1910)
- Desmeocraera oleacea Kiriakoff, 1958
- Desmeocraera pomaria Kiriakoff, 1958
- Desmeocraera postulatrix Kiriakoff, 1958
- Desmeocraera reclamatrix Kiriakoff, 1958
- Desmeocraera sagittata Gaede, 1928
- Desmeocraera sagum Kiriakoff, 1958
- Desmeocraera varia (Walker, 1855)
- Desmeocraera virescens Kiriakoff, 1958
- Desmeocraera weberiana Kiriakoff, 1958
- Diodorina insueta Kiriakoff, 1965
- Diopeithes cyamina Kiriakoff, 1958
- Elaphrodes duplex (Gaede, 1928)
- Elaphrodes nephocrossa Bethune-Baker, 1909
- Enomotarcha adversa (Karsch, 1895)
- Enomotarcha alchornea (Schultze, 1914)
- Enomotarcha apicalis (Aurivillius, 1925)
- Enomotarcha chloana (Holland, 1893)
- Enomotarcha spectabilis Kiriakoff, 1965
- Epanaphe clara (Holland, 1893)
- Epanaphe distalis Gaede, 1928
- Epanaphe fasciata (Aurivillius, 1925)
- Epanaphe moloneyi (Druce, 1887)
- Epanaphe parva (Aurivillius, 1891)
- Epidonta atra (Gaede, 1916)
- Epidonta brunneomixta (Mabille, 1897)
- Epimetula albipuncta (Gaede, 1928)
- Eurystauridia olivacea (Gaede, 1928)
- Eurystauridia triangularis (Gaede, 1928)
- Eutricholoba signata Kiriakoff, 1965
- Hampsonita esmeralda (Hampson, 1910)
- Harpandrya aeola Bryk, 1913
- Macronadata collaris Möschler, 1887
- Macronadata viridis Druce, 1910
- Odontoperas aethiops Kiriakoff, 1965
- Peratodonta brunnea Aurivillius, 1904
- Peratodonta olivacea Gaede, 1928
- Phalera atrata (Grünberg, 1907)
- Pittheides chloauchena (Holland, 1893)
- Pseudobarobata angulata Gaede, 1928
- Pseudoscrancia africana (Holland, 1893)
- Ptilura argyraspis Holland, 1893
- Pycnographa tamarix Kiriakoff, 1958
- Rhynchophalera signata Aurivillius, 1904
- Scalmicauda argenteomaculata (Aurivillius, 1892)
- Scalmicauda bicolorata Gaede, 1928
- Scalmicauda eriphyla Kiriakoff, 1979
- Scalmicauda fuscinota Aurivillius, 1904
- Scalmicauda hoesemanni (Strand, 1911)
- Scalmicauda rectilinea (Gaede, 1928)
- Scalmicauda tessmanni (Strand, 1911)
- Scalmicauda triangulum Kiriakoff, 1959
- Scarnica olivina Kiriakoff, 1962
- Scrancia africana (Aurivillius, 1904)
- Scrancia albidorsa Gaede, 1930
- Scrancia albiplaga (Gaede, 1928)
- Scrancia leucopera Hampson, 1910
- Scrancia modesta Holland, 1893
- Scrancia prothoracalis Strand, 1911
- Scrancia sagittata Gaede, 1928
- Scrancia subrosea Gaede, 1928
- Scrancia viridis Gaede, 1928
- Sidisca hypochloe Kiriakoff, 1958
- Somerina arcuata Kiriakoff, 1965
- Someropsis viriditincta Strand, 1912
- Stauropussa chloe (Holland, 1893)
- Stenostaura impeditus (Walker, 1865)
- Stenostaura ophthalmica Kiriakoff, 1968
- Synete frugalis Kiriakoff, 1959
- Synete picta Kiriakoff, 1959
- Tricholoba immodica Strand, 1911
- Tricholoba trisignata Strand, 1911
- Ulinella corticicolor (Aurivillius, 1904)

== Psychidae ==
- Eumeta cervina Druce, 1887

== Pterophoridae ==
- Fletcherella niphadarcha (Meyrick, 1930)
- Hellinsia lienigianus (Zeller, 1852)
- Marasmarcha sisyrodes Meyrick, 1921
- Megalorhipida leucodactylus (Fabricius, 1794)
- Megalorhipida tessmanni (Strand, 1913)
- Pterophorus albidus (Zeller, 1852)
- Pterophorus candidalis (Walker, 1864)
- Pterophorus lampra (Bigot, 1969)
- Pterophorus virgo (Strand, 1913)
- Sphenarches anisodactylus (Walker, 1864)
- Stenodacma wahlbergi (Zeller, 1852)

== Pyralidae ==
- Biafra separatella (Ragonot, 1888)
- Endotricha niveifimbrialis Hampson, 1906
- Endotricha vinolentalis Ragonot, 1891
- Lamoria surrufa Whalley, 1964
- Omphalobasella inconspicua Strand, 1915
- Paraglossa fumicilialis Hampson, 1916
- Paraglossa sanguimarginalis Hampson, 1916
- Patna inconspicua (Strand, 1913)
- Pyralis manihotalis Guenée, 1854

== Saturniidae ==
- Argema fournieri Darge, 1971
- Aurivillius arata (Westwood, 1849)
- Bunaea alcinoe (Stoll, 1780)
- Bunaeopsis clementi Lemaire & Rougeot, 1975
- Bunaeopsis hersilia (Westwood, 1849)
- Bunaeopsis thyene (Weymer, 1896)
- Carnegia mirabilis (Aurivillius, 1895)
- Decachorda fulvia (Druce, 1886)
- Epiphora albidus (Druce, 1886)
- Epiphora bauhiniae (Guérin-Méneville, 1832)
- Epiphora boolana Strand, 1909
- Epiphora feae Aurivillius, 1910
- Epiphora getula (Maassen & Weymer, 1885)
- Epiphora magdalena Grünberg, 1909
- Epiphora pelosoma Rothschild, 1907
- Epiphora perspicuus (Butler, 1878)
- Epiphora ploetzi (Weymer, 1880)
- Epiphora rectifascia Rothschild, 1907
- Epiphora vacuna (Westwood, 1849)
- Gonimbrasia pales (Weymer, 1908)
- Goodia astrica Darge, 1977
- Goodia falcata (Aurivillius, 1893)
- Goodia hierax Jordan, 1922
- Goodia nodulifera (Karsch, 1892)
- Goodia obscuripennis Strand, 1912
- Goodia thia Jordan, 1922
- Holocerina angulata (Aurivillius, 1893)
- Imbrasia epimethea (Drury, 1772)
- Imbrasia obscura (Butler, 1878)
- Lobobunaea acetes (Westwood, 1849)
- Lobobunaea goodi (Holland, 1893)
- Lobobunaea jeanneli Rougeot, 1959
- Lobobunaea phaedusa (Drury, 1782)
- Ludia obscura Aurivillius, 1893
- Ludia orinoptena Karsch, 1892
- Micragone agathylla (Westwood, 1849)
- Micragone camerunensis (Strand, 1909)
- Micragone martinae Rougeot, 1952
- Micragone mirei Darge, 1990
- Micragone nenia (Westwood, 1849)
- Nudaurelia alopia Westwood, 1849
- Nudaurelia anthina (Karsch, 1892)
- Nudaurelia anthinoides Rougeot, 1978
- Nudaurelia bamendana Schultze, 1914
- Nudaurelia bouvieri (Le Moult, 1933)
- Nudaurelia dione (Fabricius, 1793)
- Nudaurelia eblis Strecker, 1876
- Nudaurelia emini (Butler, 1888)
- Nudaurelia jamesoni (Druce, 1890)
- Nudaurelia xanthomma (Rothschild, 1907)
- Orthogonioptilum adiegetum Karsch, 1892
- Orthogonioptilum geniculipennis Strand, 1910
- Orthogonioptilum kahli (Holland, 1921)
- Orthogonioptilum luminosa (Bouvier, 1930)
- Orthogonioptilum monochromum Karsch, 1892
- Orthogonioptilum ochraceum Rougeot, 1958
- Orthogonioptilum prox Karsch, 1892
- Orthogonioptilum rougeoti Darge, 1973
- Orthogonioptilum solium Bouyer, 1989
- Orthogonioptilum tristis (Sonthonnax, 1898)
- Orthogonioptilum vestigiata (Holland, 1893)
- Pselaphelia gemmifera (Butler, 1878)
- Pseudantheraea discrepans (Butler, 1878)
- Pseudaphelia simplex Rebel, 1906
- Pseudimbrasia deyrollei (J. Thomson, 1858)
- Pseudobunaea alinda (Sonthonnax, 1899)
- Pseudobunaea cleopatra (Aurivillius, 1893)
- Pseudobunaea illustris Weymer, ????
- Pseudobunaea sjoestedti (Aurivillius, 1893)
- Pseudobunaea tyrrhena (Westwood, 1849)
- Tagoropsis flavinata (Walker, 1865)
- Urota herbuloti Darge, 1975
- Urota sinope (Westwood, 1849)

== Sesiidae ==
- Callisphecia bicincta Le Cerf, 1916
- Callisphecia oberthueri Le Cerf, 1916
- Camaegeria auripicta Strand, 1914
- Conopia iris Le Cerf, 1916
- Conopia maculiventris (Le Cerf, 1916)
- Conopia pauper Le Cerf, 1916
- Conopsia terminiflava Strand, 1913
- Episannina chalybea Aurivillius, 1905
- Episannina modesta (Le Cerf, 1917)
- Homogyna sanguicosta Hampson, 1919
- Macrotarsipus africanus (Beutenmüller, 1899)
- Megalosphecia gigantipes Le Cerf, 1916
- Melittia brevicornis Aurivillius, 1905
- Melittia victrix Le Cerf, 1916
- Proaegeria vouauxi Le Cerf, 1916
- Synanthedon gracilis (Hampson, 1910)
- Tipulamima festiva (Beutenmüller, 1899)
- Vespaegeria typica Strand, 1913

== Sphingidae ==
- Acanthosphinx guessfeldti (Dewitz, 1879)
- Acherontia atropos (Linnaeus, 1758)
- Agrius convolvuli (Linnaeus, 1758)
- Antinephele anomala (Butler, 1882)
- Antinephele camerounensis Clark, 1937
- Antinephele efulani Clark, 1926
- Antinephele lunulata Rothschild & Jordan, 1903
- Antinephele marcida Holland, 1893
- Avinoffia hollandi (Clark, 1917)
- Basiothia aureata (Karsch, 1891)
- Centroctena rutherfordi (Druce, 1882)
- Cephonodes hylas (Linnaeus, 1771)
- Ceridia heuglini (C. Felder & R. Felder, 1874)
- Euchloron megaera (Linnaeus, 1758)
- Falcatula cymatodes (Rothschild & Jordan, 1912)
- Hippotion aporodes Rothschild & Jordan, 1912
- Hippotion balsaminae (Walker, 1856)
- Hippotion celerio (Linnaeus, 1758)
- Hippotion gracilis (Butler, 1875)
- Hippotion irregularis (Walker, 1856)
- Hypaedalea lobipennis Strand, 1913
- Hypaedalea neglecta Carcasson, 1972
- Macroglossum trochilus (Hübner, 1823)
- Macropoliana natalensis (Butler, 1875)
- Neopolyptychus pygarga (Karsch, 1891)
- Neopolyptychus serrator (Jordan, 1929)
- Nephele accentifera (Palisot de Beauvois, 1821)
- Nephele comma Hopffer, 1857
- Nephele funebris (Fabricius, 1793)
- Nephele maculosa Rothschild & Jordan, 1903
- Nephele monostigma Clark, 1925
- Nephele peneus (Cramer, 1776)
- Phylloxiphia goodii (Holland, 1889)
- Phylloxiphia karschi (Rothschild & Jordan, 1903)
- Phylloxiphia oberthueri (Rothschild & Jordan, 1903)
- Platysphinx constrigilis (Walker, 1869)
- Platysphinx vicaria Jordan, 1920
- Polyptychoides digitatus (Karsch, 1891)
- Polyptychus affinis Rothschild & Jordan, 1903
- Polyptychus bernardii Rougeot, 1966
- Polyptychus carteri (Butler, 1882)
- Polyptychus enodia (Holland, 1889)
- Polyptychus murinus Rothschild, 1904
- Polyptychus nigriplaga Rothschild & Jordan, 1903
- Polyptychus paupercula (Holland, 1889)
- Polyptychus retusus Rothschild & Jordan, 1908
- Polyptychus thihongae Bernardi, 1970
- Pseudoclanis occidentalis Rothschild & Jordan, 1903
- Pseudoclanis rhadamistus (Fabricius, 1781)
- Rhadinopasa hornimani (Druce, 1880)
- Rufoclanis rosea (Druce, 1882)
- Temnora albilinea Rothschild, 1904
- Temnora angulosa Rothschild & Jordan, 1906
- Temnora avinoffi Clark, 1919
- Temnora camerounensis Clark, 1923
- Temnora crenulata (Holland, 1893)
- Temnora elisabethae Hering, 1930
- Temnora griseata Rothschild & Jordan, 1903
- Temnora hollandi Clark, 1920
- Temnora livida (Holland, 1889)
- Temnora nephele Clark, 1922
- Temnora ntombi Darge, 1975
- Temnora zantus (Herrich-Schäffer, 1854)
- Theretra jugurtha (Boisduval, 1875)
- Theretra orpheus (Herrich-Schäffer, 1854)
- Theretra tessmanni Gehlen, 1927
- Xanthopan morganii (Walker, 1856)

== Thyrididae ==
- Arniocera cyanoxantha (Mabille, 1893)
- Arniocera viridifasciata (Aurivillius, 1900)
- Byblisia setipes (Plötz, 1880)
- Cornuterus paratrivius Whalley, 1971
- Dysodia collinsi Whalley, 1968
- Dysodia vitrina (Boisduval, 1829)
- Dysodia zelleri (Dewitz, 1881)
- Epaena pellucida Whalley, 1971
- Epaena trijuncta (Warren, 1898)
- Kuja catenula (Pagenstecher, 1892)
- Kuja effrenata Whalley, 1971
- Lamprochrysa scintillans (Butler, 1893)
- Lamprochrysa triplex (Plötz, 1880)
- Marmax biincisa (Strand, 1914)
- Marmax hyparchus (Cramer, 1779)
- Marmax semiaurata (Walker, 1854)
- Ninia plumipes (Drury, 1782)
- Toosa batesi Bethune-Baker, 1927
- Trichobaptes auristrigata (Plötz, 1880)

== Tineidae ==
- Cataxipha euxantha Gozmány, 1965
- Cimitra fetialis (Meyrick, 1917)
- Hapsifera septica Meyrick, 1908
- Monopis coniodina Meyrick, 1931
- Monopis hypopiasta Meyrick, 1931
- Organodesma arsiptila (Meyrick, 1931)
- Organodesma petaloxantha (Meyrick, 1931)
- Perissomastix gibi Gozmány, 1965

== Tortricidae ==
- Accra erythrocyma (Meyrick, 1930)
- Accra venatrix (Meyrick, 1930)
- Acleris cameroonana Razowski, 2012
- Anaccra camerunica (Razowski, 1966)
- Anaccra limitana (Razowski, 1966)
- Apotoforma fustigera Razowski, 1986
- Basigonia anisoscia Diakonoff, 1983
- Camadeniana capitalis Strand, 1915
- Choristoneura africana Razowski, 2002
- Cydia spumans (Meyrick, 1930)
- Eccopsis wahlbergiana Zeller, 1852
- Idiothauma africanum Walsingham, 1897
- Lumaria afrotropica Razowski, 2002
- Metendothenia spumans (Meyrick, 1930)
- Mictocommosis argus (Walsingham, 1897)
- Neorrhyncha camerunica Aarvik, 2004
- Olethreutes bryoscopa (Meyrick, 1928)
- Olethreutes thermopetra (Meyrick, 1930)
- Phalarocarpa ioxanthas (Meyrick, 1930)
- Procrica camerunica Razowski, 2002
- Procrica ochrata Razowski, 2002
- Protancylis bisecta Razowski, 2002
- Sycacantha platymolybdis (Meyrick, 1930)

== Uraniidae ==
- Aploschema albaria (Plötz, 1880)
- Dissoprumna erycinaria (Guenée, 1857)

== Xyloryctidae ==
- Ommatothelxis grandis Druce, 1912

== Zygaenidae ==
- Astyloneura esmeralda (Hampson, 1920)
- Chalconycles anhyalea Hampson, 1920
- Saliunca flavifrons (Plötz, 1880)
- Saliunca solora (Plötz, 1880)
- Saliunca styx (Fabricius, 1775)
- Saliunca triguttata Aurivillius, 1925
- Saliunca ventralis Jordan, 1907
- Syringura triplex (Plötz, 1880)
- Tasema nox Holland, 1898
