= Dichomeris acratopa =

Scientific classification
- Kingdom: Animalia
- Phylum: Arthropoda
- Class: Insecta
- Order: Lepidoptera
- Family: Gelechiidae
- Genus: Dichomeris
- Species: D. acratopa

Binomial name
- Dichomeris acratopa (Meyrick, 1926)

Synonyms
- Prasodryas acratopa Meyrick, 1926

Species of moth

Dichomeris acratopa is a moth in the family Gelechiidae. It was described by Edward Meyrick in 1926. It is found in Cameroon.

The wingspan is about 17 mm (0.67 in). Adults are similar to Dichomeris fracticostella, but have the stigmata simple, dot like and dark grey, with the plical beneath the first discal.
