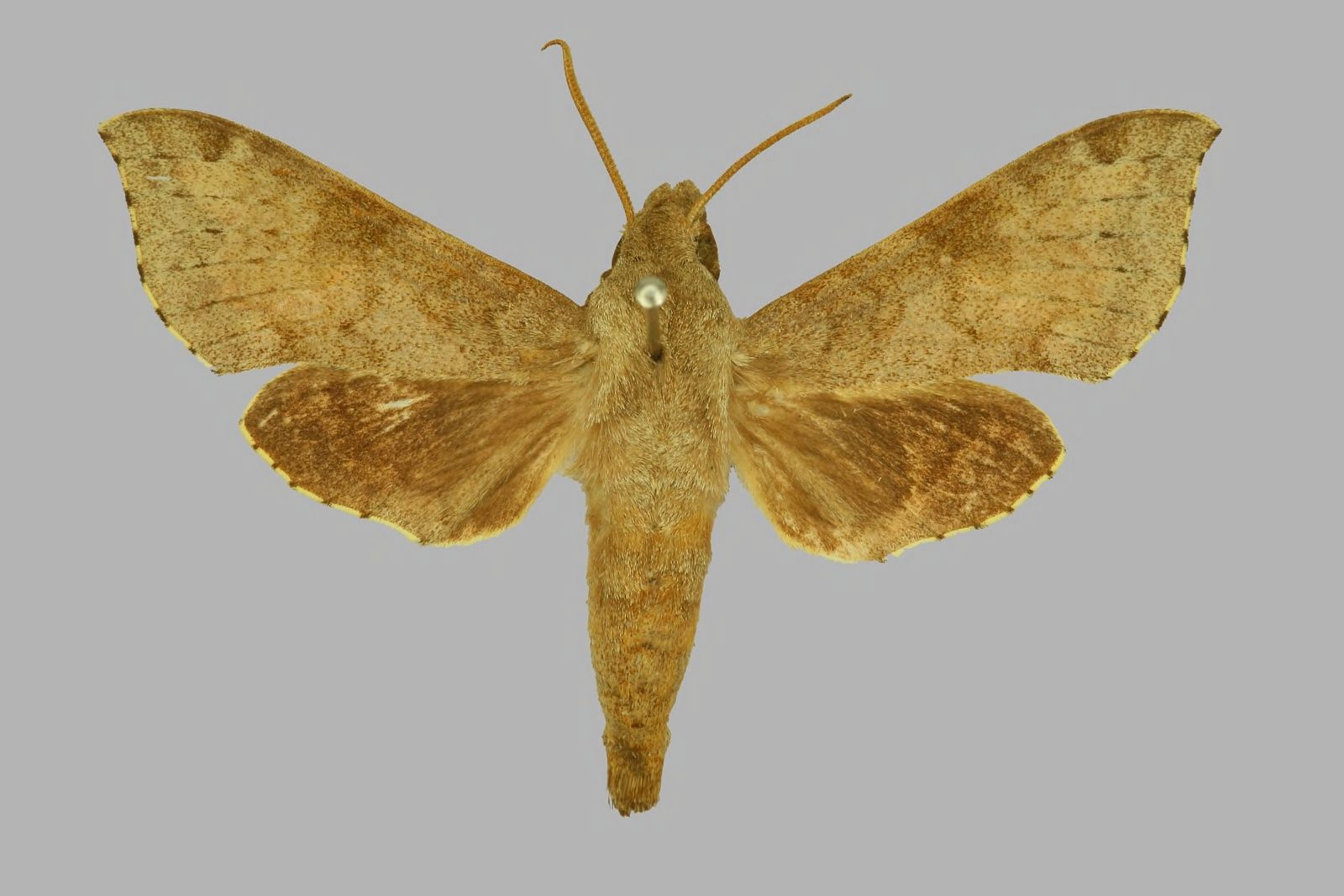

Scientific classification
- Kingdom: Animalia
- Phylum: Arthropoda
- Class: Insecta
- Order: Lepidoptera
- Family: Sphingidae
- Genus: Temnora
- Species: T. griseata

Binomial name
- Temnora griseata Rothschild & Jordan, 1903

Synonyms
- Temnora cinereofusca Strand, 1912; Temnora reutlingeri acra Gehlen, 1935

= Temnora griseata =

Species of moth

Temnora griseata is a moth of the family Sphingidae. It is known from forests from Nigeria to southern Congo, southern Tanzania and Malawi.

The length of the forewings is 25 mm for males and 27 mm for females. There are two forms of the nominate subspecies. The first similar to Temnora livida, but smaller, the forewing inner margin is less sinuate and the forewing upperside has a subapical costal brown patch which is the only distinct marking. The second form has an additional dark oblique line, basally edged with pale grey. The forewing outer margin is sharply spotted with brown on the veins.

== Subspecies ==
- Temnora griseata griseata
- Temnora griseata oxyptera Rothschild & Jordan, 1916 (Tanzania, Malawi)
- Temnora griseata ugandae Carcasson, 1972 (Uganda)
