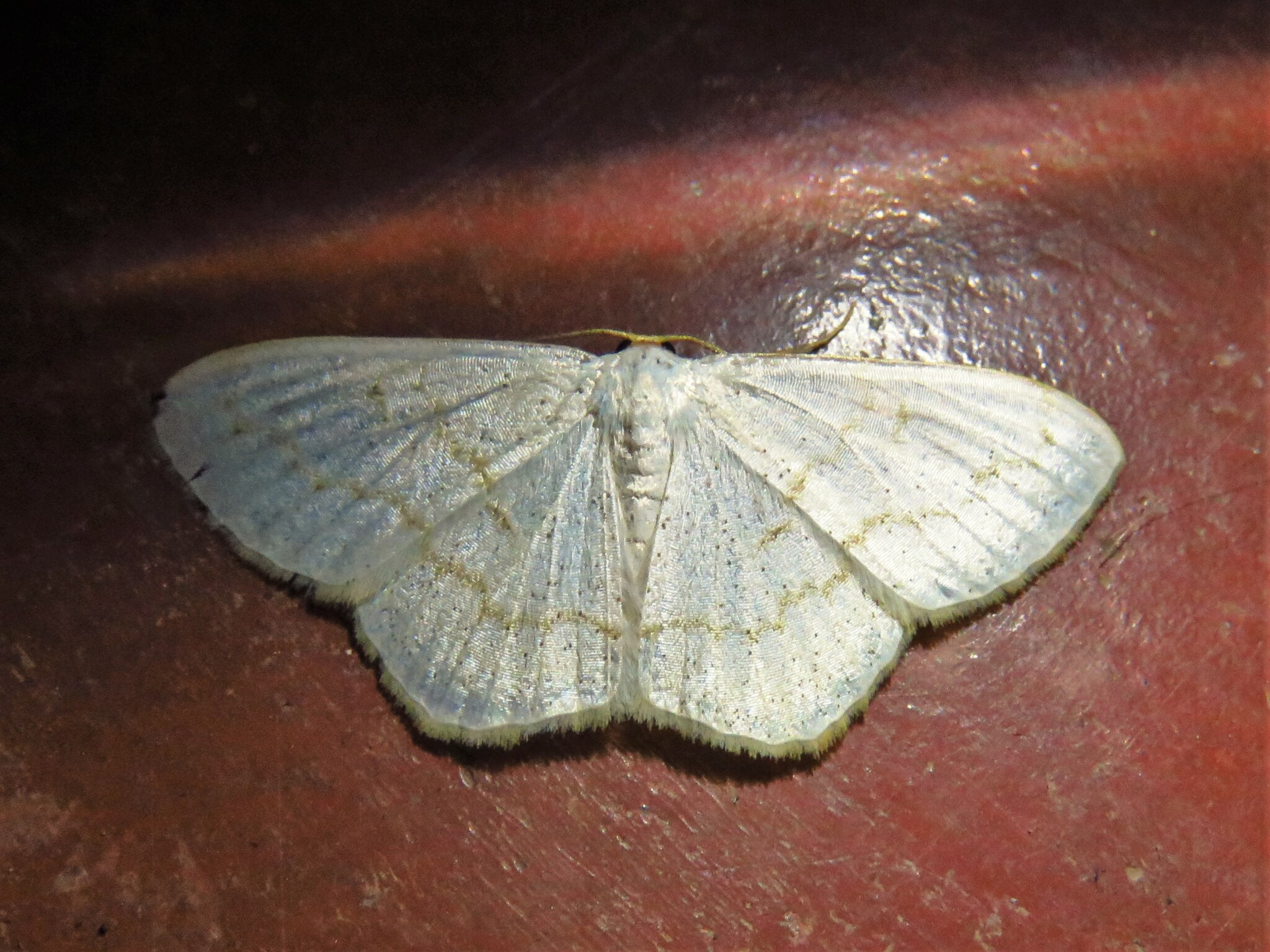

Scientific classification
- Kingdom: Animalia
- Phylum: Arthropoda
- Clade: Pancrustacea
- Class: Insecta
- Order: Lepidoptera
- Family: Geometridae
- Genus: Scopula
- Species: S. laevipennis

Binomial name
- Scopula laevipennis (Warren, 1897)

Synonyms
- Craspedia laevipennis Warren, 1897; Craspedia uninotata Warren, 1897

= Scopula laevipennis =

Species of geometer moth in subfamily Sterrhinae

Scopula laevipennis is a species of moth in the family Geometridae. It was first described by William Warren in 1897. It is found in Cameroon, the Democratic Republic of Congo, Equatorial Guinea, Gabon, Kenya, Sierra Leone, Uganda and Zambia.
