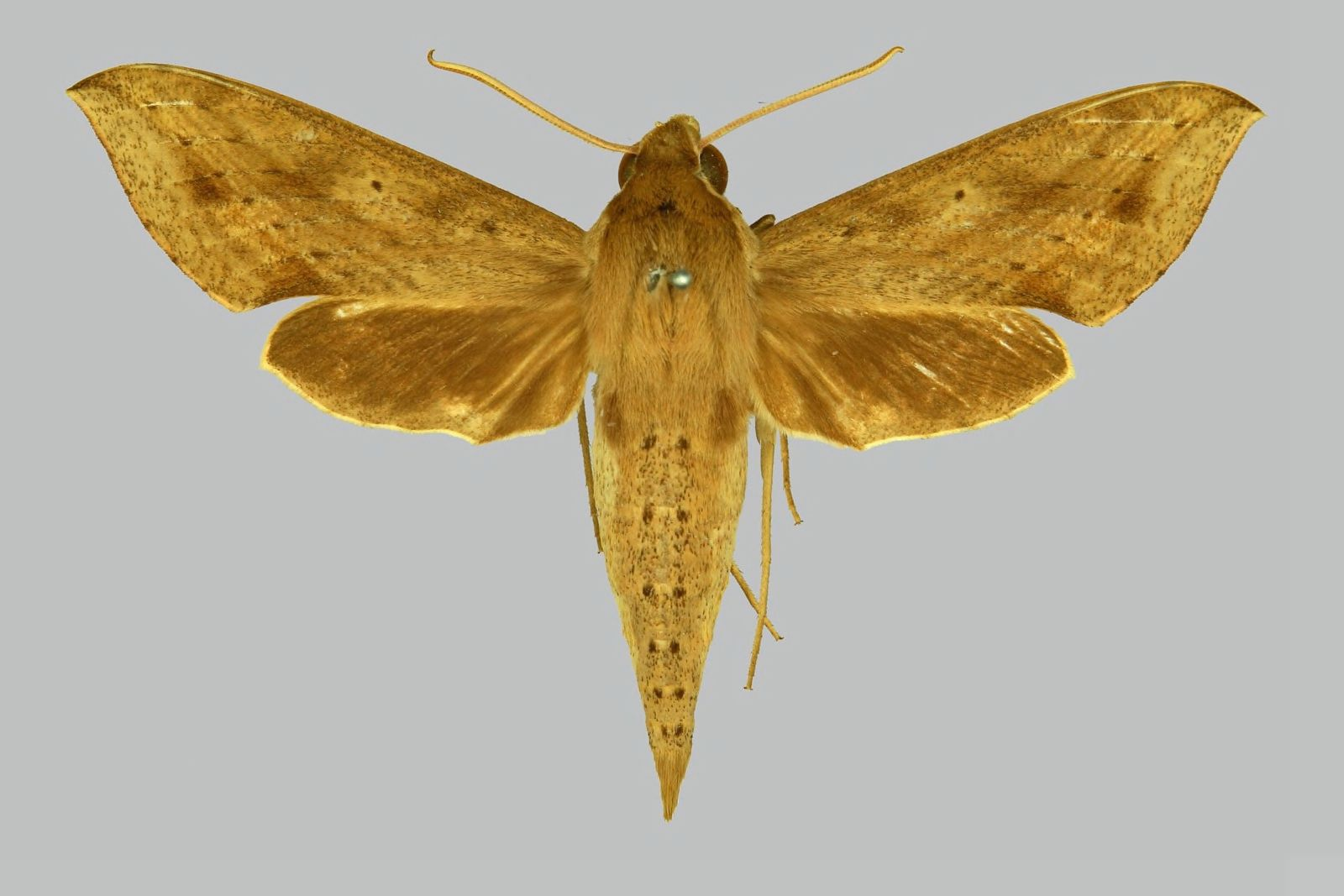
- Male, upperside

Scientific classification
- Kingdom: Animalia
- Phylum: Arthropoda
- Class: Insecta
- Order: Lepidoptera
- Family: Sphingidae
- Genus: Hippotion
- Species: H. irregularis

Binomial name
- Hippotion irregularis (Walker, 1856)

Synonyms
- Pergesa irregularis Walker, 1856; Theretra crossei Rothschild, 1896

= Hippotion irregularis =

Species of moth

Hippotion irregularis is a moth of the family Sphingidae. It is known from forests from Liberia to Congo, Uganda and western Kenya. It is also found in the Usambara area of Tanzania.
