= Scopula subperlaria =

Scientific classification
- Kingdom: Animalia
- Phylum: Arthropoda
- Class: Insecta
- Order: Lepidoptera
- Family: Geometridae
- Genus: Scopula
- Species: S. subperlaria

Binomial name
- Scopula subperlaria (Warren, 1897)

Synonyms
- Craspedia subperlaria Warren 1897; Acidalia displicitata Kheil, 1909; Craspedia sufficiens Warren, 1897

Species of geometer moth in subfamily Sterrhinae

Scopula subperlaria is a moth of the family Geometridae. It is found in Cameroon, Nigeria and Uganda.

== Subspecies ==
- Scopula subperlaria subperlaria (Cameroon, Nigeria)
- Scopula subperlaria acutangula Swinhoe, 1909 (Uganda)
