= Phyllonorycter hibiscina =

Scientific classification
- Kingdom: Animalia
- Phylum: Arthropoda
- Class: Insecta
- Order: Lepidoptera
- Family: Gracillariidae
- Genus: Phyllonorycter
- Species: P. hibiscina

Binomial name
- Phyllonorycter hibiscina (Vári, 1961)

Synonyms
- Lithocolletis hibiscina Vári, 1961

Species of moth

Phyllonorycter hibiscina is a moth of the family Gracillariidae. It is known from South Africa, Kenya, Zimbabwe and Cameroon. The habitat consists of secondary forests.

The length of the forewings is 3–4.1 mm. Adults are on wing almost year-round except in June, July and August.

The larvae feed on Brachylaena, Abutilon mauritianum, Hibiscus calyphyllus, Hibiscus lunarifolius and Pavonia. They mine the leaves of their host plant.
