= Amata leucerythra =

Scientific classification
- Domain: Eukaryota
- Kingdom: Animalia
- Phylum: Arthropoda
- Class: Insecta
- Order: Lepidoptera
- Superfamily: Noctuoidea
- Family: Erebidae
- Subfamily: Arctiinae
- Genus: Amata
- Species: A. leucerythra

Binomial name
- Amata leucerythra (Holland, 1893)

Synonyms
- Syntomis leucerythra Holland, 1893; Syntomis rubicunda Mabille, 1892

Species of moth

Amata leucerythra is a moth of the family Erebidae. It was described by William Jacob Holland in 1893. It is found in Cameroon, the Democratic Republic of the Congo, Equatorial Guinea and Gabon.
