= Amata tomasina =

Scientific classification
- Domain: Eukaryota
- Kingdom: Animalia
- Phylum: Arthropoda
- Class: Insecta
- Order: Lepidoptera
- Superfamily: Noctuoidea
- Family: Erebidae
- Subfamily: Arctiinae
- Genus: Amata
- Species: A. tomasina

Binomial name
- Amata tomasina (Butler, 1876)

Synonyms
- Syntomis tomasina Butler, 1876; Amata reducticincta Kiriakoff, 1954

Species of moth

Amata tomasina is a moth of the family Erebidae. It was described by Arthur Gardiner Butler in 1876. It is found in Cameroon, the Democratic Republic of the Congo, Equatorial Guinea, Ethiopia, Ivory Coast, Rwanda, Sierra Leone, Sudan, Gambia and Uganda.
