= Eupithecia dohertyi =

Scientific classification
- Kingdom: Animalia
- Phylum: Arthropoda
- Clade: Pancrustacea
- Class: Insecta
- Order: Lepidoptera
- Family: Geometridae
- Genus: Eupithecia
- Species: E. dohertyi

Binomial name
- Eupithecia dohertyi L. B. Prout, 1935

Species of moth

Eupithecia dohertyi is a moth in the family Geometridae described by Louis Beethoven Prout in 1935. It is found in Cameroon, Equatorial Guinea, Kenya, Rwanda, and Uganda.

== Subspecies ==
- Eupithecia dohertyi dohertyi (Kenya, Rwanda, Uganda)
- Eupithecia dohertyi fulvata D. S. Fletcher, 1951 (Uganda)
- Eupithecia dohertyi fumata D. S. Fletcher, 1951 (Cameroon, Equatorial Guinea )
