= Afraloa =

Scientific classification
- Kingdom: Animalia
- Phylum: Arthropoda
- Clade: Pancrustacea
- Class: Insecta
- Order: Lepidoptera
- Superfamily: Noctuoidea
- Family: Erebidae
- Subfamily: Arctiinae
- Genus: Afraloa; Dubatolov, 2006
- Species: A. bifurca

Binomial name
- Afraloa bifurca (Walker, 1855)

Synonyms
- Aloa bifurca Walker, 1855; Spilarctia radiosa Druce, 1898

Genus of moths

Afraloa is a monotypic tiger moth genus in the family Erebidae erected by Vladimir Viktorovitch Dubatolov in 2006. Its only species, Afraloa bifurca, was first described by Francis Walker in 1855. It is found in Cameroon, the Democratic Republic of the Congo, Equatorial Guinea, Gabon, Ghana, Kenya, Nigeria, Sierra Leone, the Gambia, Togo, Uganda and Pakistan.

== Taxonomy ==
The type species of Afraloa is Aloa bifurca Walker, 1855. The genus needs a taxonomic review of species.
