= Bertulania =

Scientific classification
- Kingdom: Animalia
- Phylum: Arthropoda
- Class: Insecta
- Order: Lepidoptera
- Superfamily: Noctuoidea
- Family: Erebidae
- Subfamily: Calpinae
- Genus: Bertulania; Strand, 1914
- Species: B. corticea

Binomial name
- Bertulania corticea Strand, 1914

Genus of moths

Bertulania is a monotypic moth genus of the family Erebidae. Its only species, Bertulania corticea, is found in Cameroon. Both the genus and species were first described by Strand in 1904.
