= Focillopis =

Scientific classification
- Kingdom: Animalia
- Phylum: Arthropoda
- Class: Insecta
- Order: Lepidoptera
- Superfamily: Noctuoidea
- Family: Noctuidae (?)
- Subfamily: Catocalinae
- Genus: Focillopis; Hampson, 1926
- Species: F. eclipsia

Binomial name
- Focillopis eclipsia Hampson, 1926

Genus of moths

Focillopis is a monotypic moth genus of the family Noctuidae. Its only species, Focillopis eclipsia, is known only from West Africa. Both the genus and species were first described by George Hampson in 1926.

It has a wingspan of 35–41 mm, a chocolate brown head, antennae with short cilia, the thorax and abdomen are dark reddish brown or greyish brown. The basic colour of both wings is greyish-brown with a chocolate-brown patch at the costa.

Two more species were described as Focillopis but where transferred to Catada by Martin Lödl in 2001.

- Catada antevorta (Viette, 1958)
- Catada dichroana (Viette, 1958)
