= Melisoides =

Scientific classification
- Domain: Eukaryota
- Kingdom: Animalia
- Phylum: Arthropoda
- Class: Insecta
- Order: Lepidoptera
- Superfamily: Noctuoidea
- Family: Erebidae
- Subfamily: Arctiinae
- Genus: Melisoides; Strand, 1912
- Species: M. lobata

Binomial name
- Melisoides lobata Strand, 1912

Synonyms
- Genus: Collartisa Kiriakoff, 1953; Species: Paramelisa bitjeana Bethune-Baker, 1927; Collartisa collartorum Kiriakoff, 1953

Genus of moths

Melisoides is a genus of moths in the family Erebidae. It contains only one species, Melisoides lobata, which is found in Cameroon, the Democratic Republic of Congo and Equatorial Guinea.

The wingspan is about 43 mm for males and 47 mm for females. Both wings are lustrous deep bronzy purple, extending to a slight extent to the head and thorax.
