= Enmonodiops =

Scientific classification
- Kingdom: Animalia
- Phylum: Arthropoda
- Class: Insecta
- Order: Lepidoptera
- Superfamily: Noctuoidea
- Family: Erebidae
- Subfamily: Calpinae
- Genus: Enmonodiops; Hampson, 1926
- Species: E. ochrodiscata

Binomial name
- Enmonodiops ochrodiscata Hampson, 1926

Genus of moths

Enmonodiops is a monotypic moth genus of the family Erebidae. Its only species, Enmonodiops ochrodiscata, is found in Cameroon, Ghana, Nigeria and Uganda. Both the genus and the species were first described by George Hampson in 1926.
