= Sarothroceras =

Scientific classification
- Domain: Eukaryota
- Kingdom: Animalia
- Phylum: Arthropoda
- Class: Insecta
- Order: Lepidoptera
- Superfamily: Noctuoidea
- Family: Erebidae
- Subfamily: Calpinae
- Genus: Sarothroceras; Mabille, 1889
- Species: S. banaka

Binomial name
- Sarothroceras banaka (Plötz, 1880)

Synonyms
- Dichromia banaka Plötz, 1880; Phaegorista pallida H. Druce, 1883; Sarothroceras alluaudi Mabille, 1889; Sarothroceras rhomboidea Weymer, 1892; Sarothroceras sordidus Rothschild, 1896; Sarothroceras alluaudi var. tessmanni Gaede, 1914

Genus of moths

Sarothroceras is a monotypic moth genus of the family Erebidae erected by Paul Mabille in 1889. Its only species, Sarothroceras banaka, was first described by Carl Plötz in 1880. It is found in Benin, Cameroon, the Democratic Republic of the Congo, Ivory Coast, Equatorial Guinea, Gabon, Ghana, Nigeria, Nigeria, Tanzania and Uganda.
