= Scopula recurvata =

Scientific classification
- Domain: Eukaryota
- Kingdom: Animalia
- Phylum: Arthropoda
- Class: Insecta
- Order: Lepidoptera
- Family: Geometridae
- Genus: Scopula
- Species: S. recurvata

Binomial name
- Scopula recurvata Herbulot, 1992

Species of geometer moth in subfamily Sterrhinae

Scopula recurvata is a moth of the family Geometridae. It is found in Cameroon and Equatorial Guinea (Bioko).
