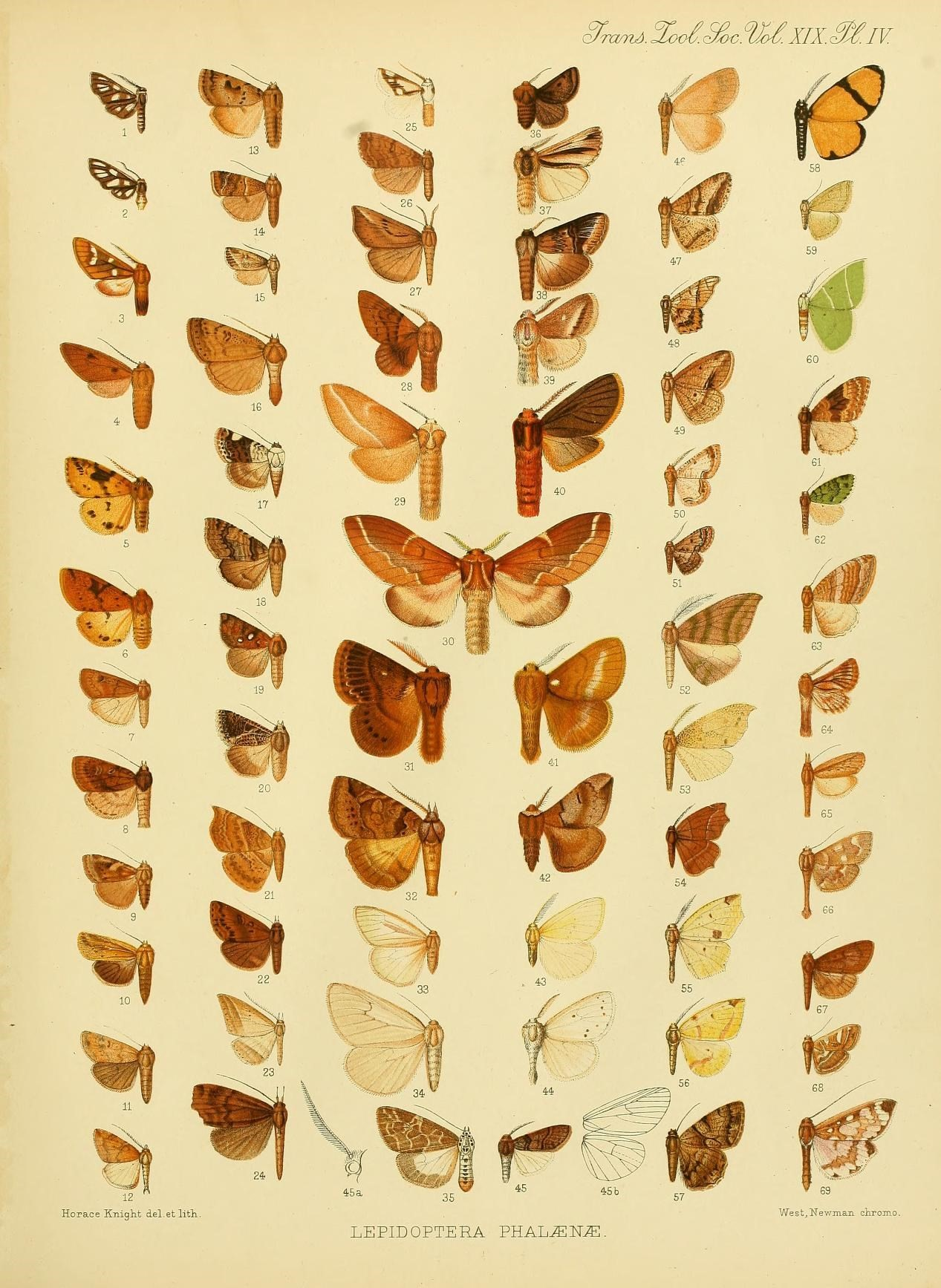
- Fig 5 Male, Fig 6 Female

Scientific classification
- Kingdom: Animalia
- Phylum: Arthropoda
- Clade: Pancrustacea
- Class: Insecta
- Order: Lepidoptera
- Superfamily: Noctuoidea
- Family: Erebidae
- Subfamily: Arctiinae
- Genus: Pericaliella; Dubatolov, 2006
- Species: P. melanodisca

Binomial name
- Pericaliella melanodisca (Hampson, 1907)

Synonyms
- Diacrisia melanodisca Hampson, 1907

= Pericaliella =

Genus of moths

Pericaliella is a genus of moths in the subfamily Arctiinae that is known from the Afrotropics. It includes one species Pericaliella melanodisca (Hampson, 1907) from Cameroon, Zaire, Uganda and Rwanda.
