= Pyrausta marginepunctalis =

Scientific classification
- Kingdom: Animalia
- Phylum: Arthropoda
- Class: Insecta
- Order: Lepidoptera
- Family: Crambidae
- Genus: Pyrausta
- Species: P. marginepunctalis

Binomial name
- Pyrausta marginepunctalis Gaede, 1916

Species of moth

Pyrausta marginepunctalis is a moth in the family Crambidae. It was described by Max Gaede in 1916. It is found in Cameroon.
