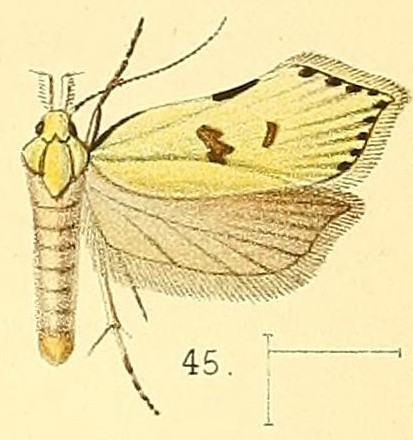

Scientific classification
- Domain: Eukaryota
- Kingdom: Animalia
- Phylum: Arthropoda
- Class: Insecta
- Order: Lepidoptera
- Family: Gelechiidae
- Genus: Dichomeris
- Species: D. fracticostella

Binomial name
- Dichomeris fracticostella (Walsingham, 1891)

Synonyms
- Anorthosia fracticostella Walsingham, 1891

= Dichomeris fracticostella =

Species of moth

Dichomeris fracticostella is a moth in the family Gelechiidae. It was described by Thomas de Grey, 6th Baron Walsingham, in 1891. It is found in Ghana and Gambia.

The wingspan is 15–16 mm. The forewings are pale olive-green with a small brown streak along the extreme base of the costal margin, followed by a few brown scales on the convex part of the margin near the basal third of the wing-length. There is a distinct dark brown narrow line-like spot along the extreme costal margin, scarcely beyond the middle, and a few brown scales in the cilia of the pre-apical costal projection. There is a reduplicated brown spot just before the middle of the wing, the upper portion of which is almost round, while the lower portion is triangular, with the apex pointing outwards. At the lower angle on the fold is a roundish spot of a darker brown and there is an obliquely-placed linear spot of dark brown scales at the end of the cell, as well as five small spots of the same colour at the extreme edge along the apical margin, with three similar spots above the apex, between it and the costal projection. Two similar spots also occur on the dorsal margin. The hindwings are pale greyish brown.
