= Elachista cordata =

Scientific classification
- Kingdom: Animalia
- Phylum: Arthropoda
- Clade: Pancrustacea
- Class: Insecta
- Order: Lepidoptera
- Family: Elachistidae
- Genus: Elachista
- Species: E. cordata

Binomial name
- Elachista cordata Sruoga & J. de Prins, 2011

Species of moth

Elachista cordata is a moth of the family Elachistidae that is found in Cameroon.

The wingspan is 8.7–8.8 millimetres (0.34–0.35 in). Adults have been recorded in early May.

== Etymology ==
The species name is derived from the Latin cordatus (meaning heart shaped) and refers to the shape of the gnathos.
