= Brachyherca =

Scientific classification
- Kingdom: Animalia
- Phylum: Arthropoda
- Class: Insecta
- Order: Lepidoptera
- Superfamily: Noctuoidea
- Family: Erebidae
- Subfamily: Calpinae
- Genus: Brachyherca; Hampson, 1926
- Species: B. saphobasis

Binomial name
- Brachyherca saphobasis Hampson, 1926

Genus of moths

Brachyherca is a monotypic moth genus of the family Erebidae. Its only species, Brachyherca saphobasis, is found in Cameroon and Gabon. Both the genus and the species were first described by George Hampson in 1926.
