= Phyllonorycter farensis =

Scientific classification
- Kingdom: Animalia
- Phylum: Arthropoda
- Class: Insecta
- Order: Lepidoptera
- Family: Gracillariidae
- Genus: Phyllonorycter
- Species: P. farensis

Binomial name
- Phyllonorycter farensis De Prins & De Prins, 2007

Species of moth

Phyllonorycter farensis is a moth of the family Gracillariidae. It is known from the Faro River Reserve in Cameroon and the southern part of the Democratic Republic of the Congo.

The length of the forewings is about 2.7 mm for males and about 3.2 mm for females. Adults are on wing in late November.
