= Scopula jejuna =

Scientific classification
- Kingdom: Animalia
- Phylum: Arthropoda
- Class: Insecta
- Order: Lepidoptera
- Family: Geometridae
- Genus: Scopula
- Species: S. jejuna

Binomial name
- Scopula jejuna Prout, 1932

Species of geometer moth in subfamily Sterrhinae

Scopula jejuna is a moth of the family Geometridae. It was described by Prout in 1932. It is found in Cameroon and Nigeria.
