= Eilema pulverosa =

Scientific classification
- Domain: Eukaryota
- Kingdom: Animalia
- Phylum: Arthropoda
- Class: Insecta
- Order: Lepidoptera
- Superfamily: Noctuoidea
- Family: Erebidae
- Subfamily: Arctiinae
- Genus: Eilema
- Species: E. pulverosa

Binomial name
- Eilema pulverosa Aurivillius, 1904

Synonyms
- Eilema angulistrigata Strand, 1912; Phryganopsis ilemimorpha Strand, 1912

Species of moth

Eilema pulverosa is a moth of the subfamily Arctiinae. It is found in Cameroon, Ghana, Nigeria, Togo and Uganda.
