= Lobophyllodes =

Scientific classification
- Kingdom: Animalia
- Phylum: Arthropoda
- Clade: Pancrustacea
- Class: Insecta
- Order: Lepidoptera
- Superfamily: Noctuoidea
- Family: Noctuidae (?)
- Subfamily: Catocalinae
- Genus: Lobophyllodes; Hampson, 1913
- Species: L. miniatus

Binomial name
- Lobophyllodes miniatus (Grünberg, 1907)

Genus of moths

Lobophyllodes is a monotypic moth genus of the family Noctuidae erected by George Hampson in 1913. Its only species, Lobophyllodes miniatus, was first described by Karl Grünberg in 1907. It is found in Cameroon, the Central African Republic, the Democratic Republic of the Congo, Gabon and Ghana.
