= Eupithecia devestita =

Scientific classification
- Domain: Eukaryota
- Kingdom: Animalia
- Phylum: Arthropoda
- Class: Insecta
- Order: Lepidoptera
- Family: Geometridae
- Genus: Eupithecia
- Species: E. devestita

Binomial name
- Eupithecia devestita (Warren, 1899)

Synonyms
- Tephroclystia devestita Warren, 1899

Species of moth

Eupithecia devestita is a moth in the family Geometridae. It is found in Cameroon, Ethiopia, Kenya, South Africa, Tanzania and Uganda.
