= Amata borguensis =

Scientific classification
- Kingdom: Animalia
- Phylum: Arthropoda
- Class: Insecta
- Order: Lepidoptera
- Superfamily: Noctuoidea
- Family: Erebidae
- Subfamily: Arctiinae
- Genus: Amata
- Species: A. borguensis

Binomial name
- Amata borguensis (Hampson, 1901)

Synonyms
- Syntomis borguensis Hampson, 1901

Species of moth

Amata borguensis is a moth of the subfamily Arctiinae. It was described by George Hampson in 1901. It is found in Cameroon and Nigeria.
