= Eupithecia dilucida =

Scientific classification
- Domain: Eukaryota
- Kingdom: Animalia
- Phylum: Arthropoda
- Class: Insecta
- Order: Lepidoptera
- Family: Geometridae
- Genus: Eupithecia
- Species: E. dilucida

Binomial name
- Eupithecia dilucida (Warren, 1899)

Synonyms
- Tephroclystia dilucida Warren, 1899

Species of moth

Eupithecia dilucida is a species of moth belonging to the family Geometridae, which is a large family commonly referred to as geometer moths. It is found in Cameroon, the Democratic Republic of Congo, Ethiopia, Kenya, Madagascar, Rwanda, Tanzania, Uganda and possibly South Africa.
