= Filiola occidentale =

Scientific classification
- Kingdom: Animalia
- Phylum: Arthropoda
- Class: Insecta
- Order: Lepidoptera
- Family: Lasiocampidae
- Genus: Filiola
- Species: F. occidentale

Binomial name
- Filiola occidentale (Strand, 1912)

Synonyms
- Taragama ligniclusum var. occidentale Strand, 1912; Pachypasa subhyalina Bethune-Baker, 1927

Species of moth

Filiola occidentale is a moth in the family Lasiocampidae. It was described by Strand in 1912. It is found in Cameroon, the Democratic Republic of Congo, Equatorial Guinea, Gabon, Ivory Coast and Nigeria.

The wingspan is about 86 mm. The forewings are brownish grey, with a dark, irregular, very oblique, somewhat dentate stripe from the inner margin near the base to well beyond the cell, where it is rounded basewards slightly to the costa. Beyond this is a second irregular similar stripe extending to the costa almost to the apex, whilst in the subterminal area there is a trace of another stripe. The hindwings are rather transparent white, with the apex and termen to vein two mauve-grey.
