= Scopula forbesi =

Scientific classification
- Kingdom: Animalia
- Phylum: Arthropoda
- Clade: Pancrustacea
- Class: Insecta
- Order: Lepidoptera
- Family: Geometridae
- Genus: Scopula
- Species: S. forbesi

Binomial name
- Scopula forbesi (H. Druce, 1884)

Synonyms
- Aletis forbesi H. Druce, 1884; Cartaletis forbesi; Cartaletis flexilimes Warren, 1897

Species of geometer moth in subfamily Sterrhinae

Scopula forbesi is a moth of the family Geometridae first described by Herbert Druce in 1884. It is found in Cameroon and Nigeria.
