= Amata waldowi =

Scientific classification
- Domain: Eukaryota
- Kingdom: Animalia
- Phylum: Arthropoda
- Class: Insecta
- Order: Lepidoptera
- Superfamily: Noctuoidea
- Family: Erebidae
- Subfamily: Arctiinae
- Genus: Amata
- Species: A. waldowi

Binomial name
- Amata waldowi (Grünberg, 1907)

Synonyms
- Syntomis waldowi Grünberg, 1907

Species of moth

Amata waldowi is a moth of the family Erebidae. It was described by Karl Grünberg in 1907. It is found in Cameroon, the Democratic Republic of the Congo and Togo.
