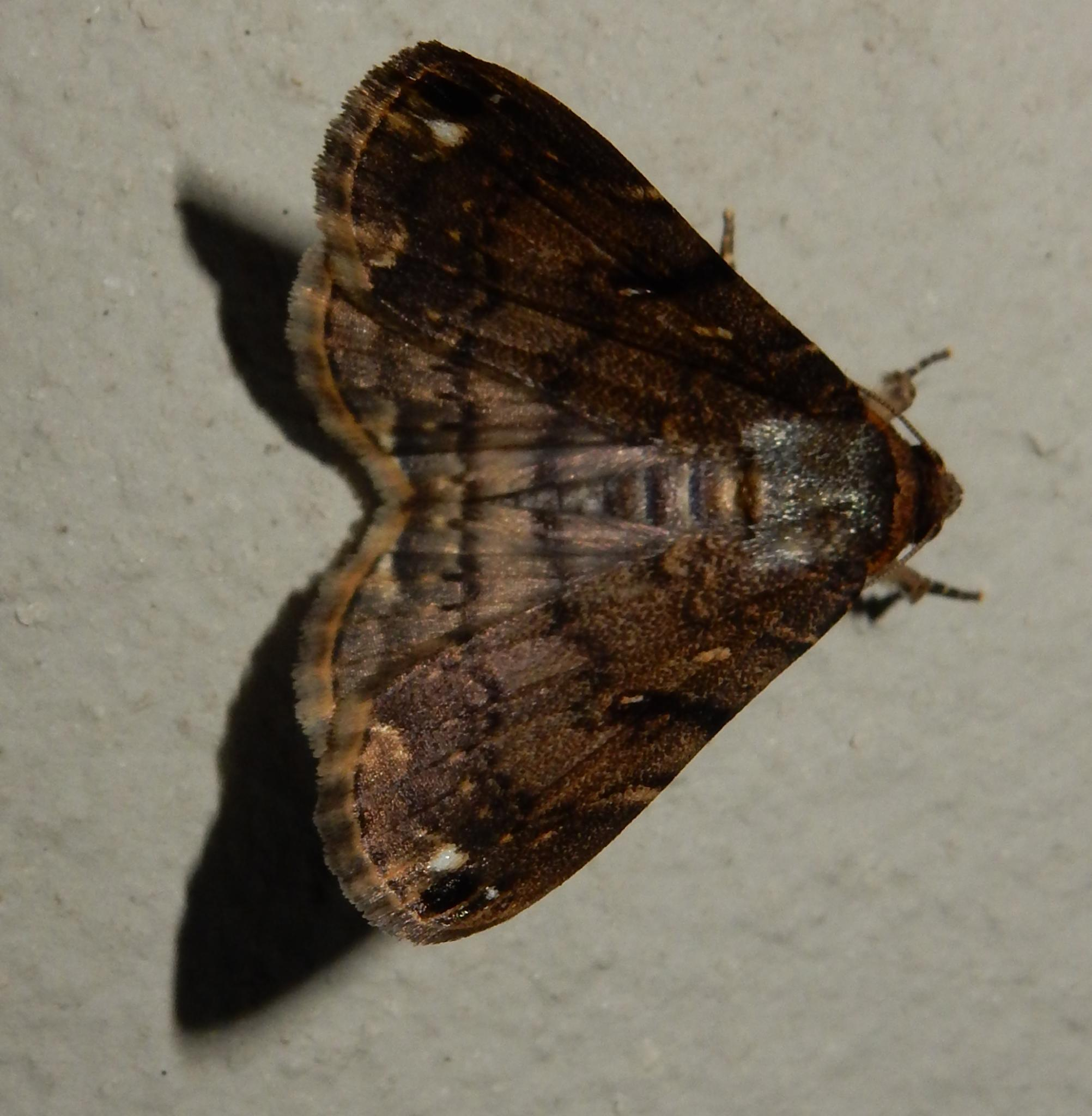

Scientific classification
- Kingdom: Animalia
- Phylum: Arthropoda
- Class: Insecta
- Order: Lepidoptera
- Superfamily: Noctuoidea
- Family: Erebidae
- Subfamily: Calpinae
- Genus: Bareia; Walker, 1858
- Species: B. incidens

Binomial name
- Bareia incidens Walker, 1858

Synonyms
- Bareia oculigera Guenée, 1852

= Bareia =

Genus of moths

Bareia is a monotypic moth genus of the family Erebidae. Its only species, Bareia incidens, is found in South Africa. Both the genus and the species were first described by Francis Walker in 1858.
