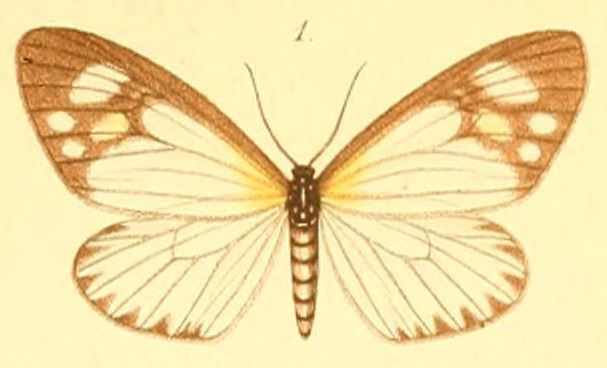

Scientific classification
- Kingdom: Animalia
- Phylum: Arthropoda
- Class: Insecta
- Order: Lepidoptera
- Family: Geometridae
- Genus: Cartaletis
- Species: C. gracilis

Binomial name
- Cartaletis gracilis (Möschler, 1887)

Synonyms
- Aletis alba Druce; Aletis gracilis (Möschler, 1887); Aletis gracilis subsp. alba (Druce, 1896); Aletis gracilis subsp. gracilis; Aletis gracilis subsp. landbecki Prout L.B., 1919; Aletis gracilis subsp. pallida (Warren, 1894); Aletis gracilis subsp. variegata Prout L.B., 1916; Amnemopsyche gracilis Möschler, 1887; Leptalis pallida Warren, 1894

= Cartaletis gracilis =

Species of moth

Cartaletis gracilis is a moth of the family Geometridae first described by Heinrich Benno Möschler in 1887. It is found in Cameroon, the Democratic Republic of the Congo, Ghana and Sierra Leone.

== Subspecies ==
- Cartaletis gracilis gracilis (Ghana, Sierra Leone)
- Cartaletis gracilis landbecki (Prout, 1919) (Democratic Republic of the Congo)
- Cartaletis gracilis variegata (Prout, 1916) (Cameroon)
