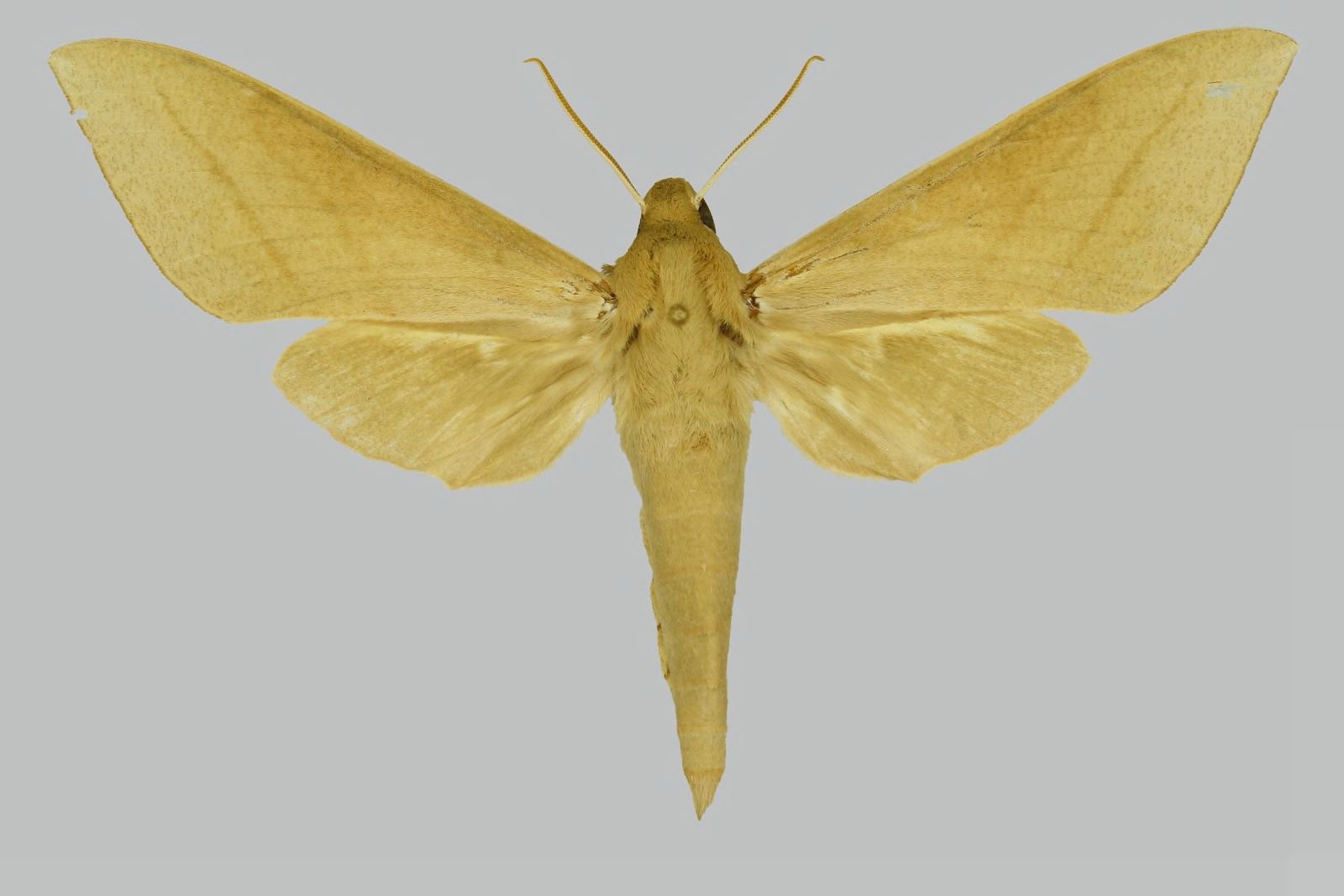
- Upperside view of male Theretra tessmanni

Scientific classification
- Kingdom: Animalia
- Phylum: Arthropoda
- Class: Insecta
- Order: Lepidoptera
- Family: Sphingidae
- Genus: Theretra
- Species: T. tessmanni

Binomial name
- Theretra tessmanni Gehlen, 1927

= Theretra tessmanni =

Species of moth

Theretra tessmanni is a moth of the family Sphingidae. It is known from Cameroon and Nigeria.

The wingspan is 68–80 mm for males and 80–90 mm for females.
