= Trisulopsis =

Scientific classification
- Kingdom: Animalia
- Phylum: Arthropoda
- Class: Insecta
- Order: Lepidoptera
- Superfamily: Noctuoidea
- Family: Erebidae
- Subfamily: Calpinae
- Genus: Trisulopsis; Strand, 1909
- Species: T. clathrata

Binomial name
- Trisulopsis clathrata (Grünberg, 1907)

Genus of moths

Trisulopsis is a monotypic moth genus of the family Erebidae described by Strand in 1909. Its only species, Trisulopsis clathrata, was first described by Karl Grünberg in 1907. It is found in Cameroon.

The Global Lepidoptera Names Index gives this name as a synonym of Trisula Moore, 1860.
