= Eupithecia nigribasis =

Scientific classification
- Domain: Eukaryota
- Kingdom: Animalia
- Phylum: Arthropoda
- Class: Insecta
- Order: Lepidoptera
- Family: Geometridae
- Genus: Eupithecia
- Species: E. nigribasis

Binomial name
- Eupithecia nigribasis (Warren, 1902)

Synonyms
- Tephroclystia nigribasis Warren, 1902

Species of moth

Eupithecia nigribasis is a moth in the family Geometridae. It is found in Cameroon, the Democratic Republic of Congo, Equatorial Guinea, Kenya and South Africa.
