= Microbergeria =

Scientific classification
- Kingdom: Animalia
- Phylum: Arthropoda
- Class: Insecta
- Order: Lepidoptera
- Superfamily: Noctuoidea
- Family: Erebidae
- Subfamily: Arctiinae
- Genus: Microbergeria; Kiriakoff, 1972
- Species: M. luctuosa

Binomial name
- Microbergeria luctuosa Kiriakoff, 1972

Genus of moths

Microbergeria is a genus of moths in the family Erebidae. It contains the single species Microbergeria luctuosa, which is found in Cameroon.
