= Cosmopterix athesiae =

Scientific classification
- Kingdom: Animalia
- Phylum: Arthropoda
- Clade: Pancrustacea
- Class: Insecta
- Order: Lepidoptera
- Family: Cosmopterigidae
- Genus: Cosmopterix
- Species: C. athesiae

Binomial name
- Cosmopterix athesiae Huemer & Koster, 2006

Species of moth

Cosmopterix athesiae is a moth of the family Cosmopterigidae. It is known from Italy (South Tirol), Spain, Greece and Africa (Cameroon and Tanzania).

The wingspan is about 10 mm. The wings are metallic shining brown, yellow and white.

== History of study and etymology ==
It was collected by Danish entomologist Wilhelm von Hedemann in 1898 but was not formally described until 2006. It is named for Etschland in southern Tirol (Athesis is the old Latin name for the region).
