= Phyllonorycter gozmanyi =

Scientific classification
- Kingdom: Animalia
- Phylum: Arthropoda
- Class: Insecta
- Order: Lepidoptera
- Family: Gracillariidae
- Genus: Phyllonorycter
- Species: P. gozmanyi

Binomial name
- Phyllonorycter gozmanyi De Prins & De Prins, 2007

Species of moth

Phyllonorycter gozmanyi is a moth of the family Gracillariidae. It is known from Cameroon. The habitat consists of savannah.

The length of the forewings is about 3.1 mm for males and 2.9-3.3 mm for females. Adults are on wing at the end of November and early December.
