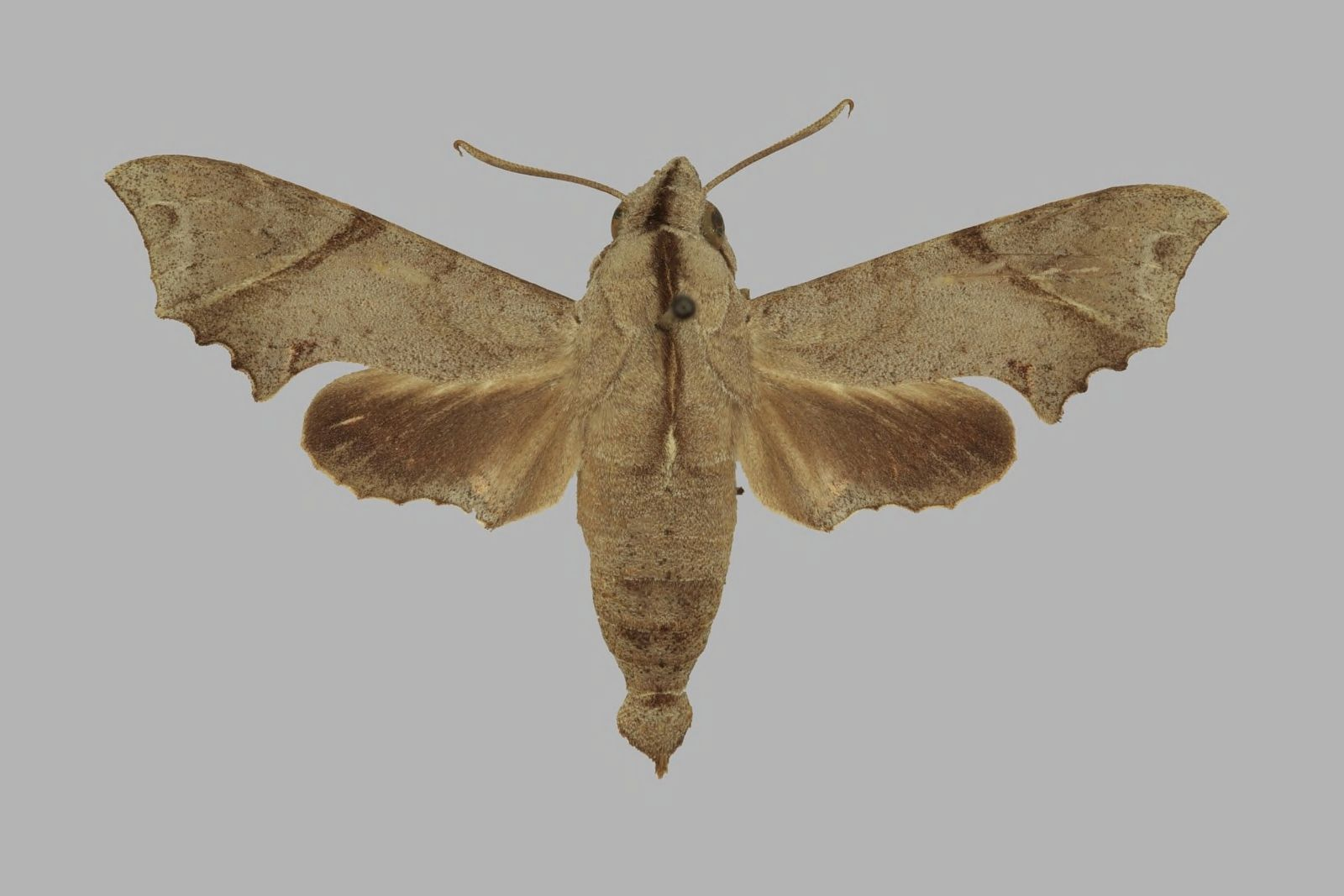

Scientific classification
- Kingdom: Animalia
- Phylum: Arthropoda
- Class: Insecta
- Order: Lepidoptera
- Family: Sphingidae
- Genus: Temnora
- Species: T. crenulata

Binomial name
- Temnora crenulata (Holland, 1893)

Synonyms
- Ocyton crenulata Holland, 1893

= Temnora crenulata =

Species of moth

Temnora crenulata is a moth of the family Sphingidae. It is known from forests from Sierra Leone to Congo, Uganda and western Kenya, with an isolated population in the Usambara Mountains of north-eastern Tanzania.

== Description ==
The length of the forewings is 22–28 mm.

== Subspecies ==
- Temnora crenulata crenulata
- Temnora crenulata obsoleta Darge, 2004 (Tanzania)
