= Barobata =

Scientific classification
- Kingdom: Animalia
- Phylum: Arthropoda
- Class: Insecta
- Order: Lepidoptera
- Superfamily: Noctuoidea
- Family: Erebidae
- Tribe: Lymantriini
- Genus: Barobata; Karsch, 1895
- Species: B. trocta

Binomial name
- Barobata trocta Karsch, 1895

Synonyms
- Macronadata viridis H. Druce, 1910

Genus of moths

Barobata is a monotypic moth genus in the subfamily Lymantriinae. Its only species, Barobata trocta, is found in Togo and what was then the Cameroons. Both the genus and the species were first described by Ferdinand Karsch in 1895.
