= Scopula macrocelis =

Scientific classification
- Kingdom: Animalia
- Phylum: Arthropoda
- Clade: Pancrustacea
- Class: Insecta
- Order: Lepidoptera
- Family: Geometridae
- Genus: Scopula
- Species: S. macrocelis

Binomial name
- Scopula macrocelis (Prout, 1915)

Synonyms
- Acidalia macrocelis Prout, 1915

Species of geometer moth in subfamily Sterrhinae

Scopula macrocelis is a moth of the family Geometridae. It is found in the Republic of Congo and Cameroon.
