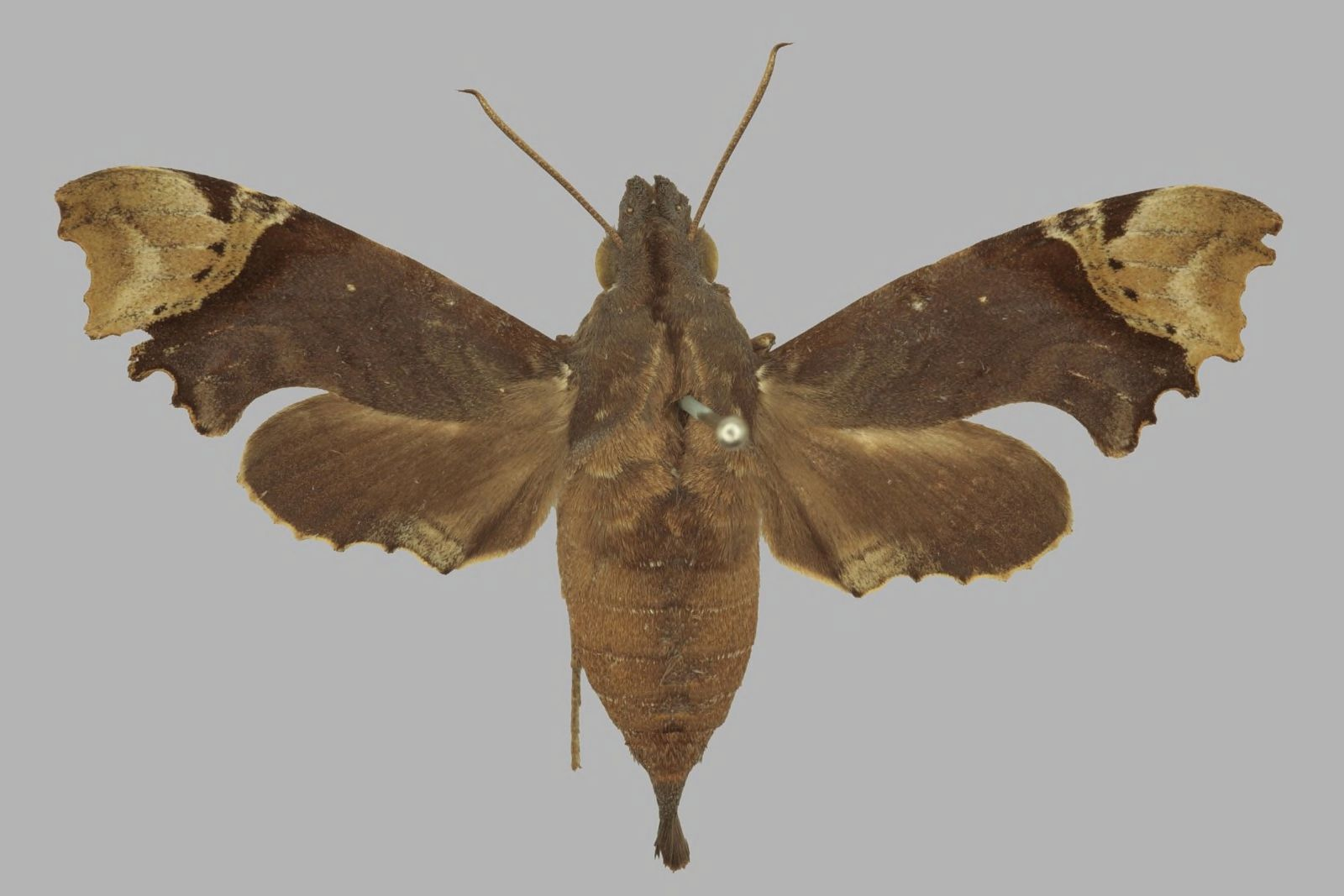

Scientific classification
- Kingdom: Animalia
- Phylum: Arthropoda
- Class: Insecta
- Order: Lepidoptera
- Family: Sphingidae
- Genus: Temnora
- Species: T. zantus

Binomial name
- Temnora zantus (Herrich-Schäffer, 1854)

Synonyms
- Aspledon dorus Boisduval, 1875; Enyo excisa Walker, 1856; Lophura zantus Herrich-Schäffer, 1854; Temnora brunnescens Clark, 1919; Pseudenyo zantus apiciplaga Karsch, 1891

= Temnora zantus =

Species of moth

Temnora zantus is a moth of the family Sphingidae. It is known from forests in Congo and Uganda.

== Subspecies ==
- Temnora zantus zantus (South Africa)
- Temnora zantus apiciplaga (Karsch, 1891) (Cameroon to Uganda and western Kenya)
- Temnora zantus curvilimes Hering, 1927 (forest and woodland from Zimbabwe and Mozambique to Malawi, Tanzania and the coast of Kenya)
