= Scopula anoista =

Scientific classification
- Domain: Eukaryota
- Kingdom: Animalia
- Phylum: Arthropoda
- Class: Insecta
- Order: Lepidoptera
- Family: Geometridae
- Genus: Scopula
- Species: S. anoista

Binomial name
- Scopula anoista (Prout, 1915)

Synonyms
- Pylarge anoista Prout, 1915

Species of geometer moth in subfamily Sterrhinae

Scopula anoista is a moth of the family Geometridae. It was described by Prout in 1915. It is found in Cameroon, Equatorial Guinea and Ivory Coast.
