= Eupithecia steeleae =

Scientific classification
- Kingdom: Animalia
- Phylum: Arthropoda
- Class: Insecta
- Order: Lepidoptera
- Family: Geometridae
- Genus: Eupithecia
- Species: E. steeleae

Binomial name
- Eupithecia steeleae D. S. Fletcher, 1951

Species of moth

Eupithecia steeleae is a moth in the family Geometridae. It was described by David Stephen Fletcher in 1951. It is found in Cameroon.
