= Scopula fuscobrunnea =

Scientific classification
- Domain: Eukaryota
- Kingdom: Animalia
- Phylum: Arthropoda
- Class: Insecta
- Order: Lepidoptera
- Family: Geometridae
- Genus: Scopula
- Species: S. fuscobrunnea

Binomial name
- Scopula fuscobrunnea (Warren, 1901)

Synonyms
- Craspedia fuscobrunnea Warren, 1901; Acidalia fuscifusa Prout, 1911

Species of geometer moth in subfamily Sterrhinae

Scopula fuscobrunnea is a moth of the family Geometridae. It was described by Warren in 1901. It is found in Cameroon and Kenya.
