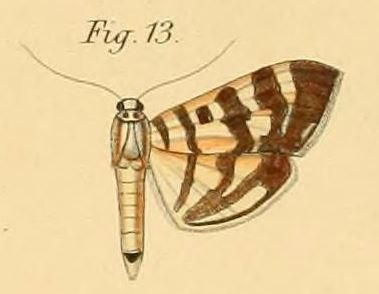
- Syllepte butleri

Scientific classification
- Domain: Eukaryota
- Kingdom: Animalia
- Phylum: Arthropoda
- Class: Insecta
- Order: Lepidoptera
- Family: Crambidae
- Genus: Syllepte
- Species: S. butlerii

Binomial name
- Syllepte butlerii (Dewitz, 1881)

Synonyms
- Botys butlerii Dewitz, 1881; Syllepte clementsi Hampson, 1898; Syllepte butleri Klima, 1939

= Syllepte butlerii =

Species of moth

Syllepte butlerii is a moth in the family Crambidae. It was described by Hermann Dewitz in 1881. It is found in Angola, Cameroon, the Democratic Republic of the Congo (Katanga, East Kasai), Sierra Leone and Zambia.
