= Cataxipha =

Scientific classification
- Kingdom: Animalia
- Phylum: Arthropoda
- Clade: Pancrustacea
- Class: Insecta
- Order: Lepidoptera
- Family: Tineidae
- Genus: Cataxipha; Gozmany, 1965
- Species: C. euxantha

Binomial name
- Cataxipha euxantha Gozmány, 1965

Genus of moths

Cataxipha is a genus of moths belonging to the family Tineidae. It contains only one species, Cataxipha euxantha, which is found in Cameroon.
