= Ctenolita argyrobapta =

Scientific classification
- Kingdom: Animalia
- Phylum: Arthropoda
- Clade: Pancrustacea
- Class: Insecta
- Order: Lepidoptera
- Family: Limacodidae
- Genus: Ctenolita
- Species: C. argyrobapta

Binomial name
- Ctenolita argyrobapta Karsch, 1899

Species of moth

Ctenolita argyrobapta is a moth species in the family of Limacodidae found in Cameroon and Ghana. The type is provided from Bipindé, southern Cameroon.

This species has a wingspan of 38mm.
