= Scopula sapor =

Scientific classification
- Kingdom: Animalia
- Phylum: Arthropoda
- Class: Insecta
- Order: Lepidoptera
- Family: Geometridae
- Genus: Scopula
- Species: S. sapor

Binomial name
- Scopula sapor (H. Druce, 1910)

Synonyms
- Aletis sapor H. Druce, 1910; Cartaletis sapor

Species of geometer moth in subfamily Sterrhinae

Scopula sapor is a moth of the family Geometridae first described by Herbert Druce in 1910. It is found in Cameroon.
