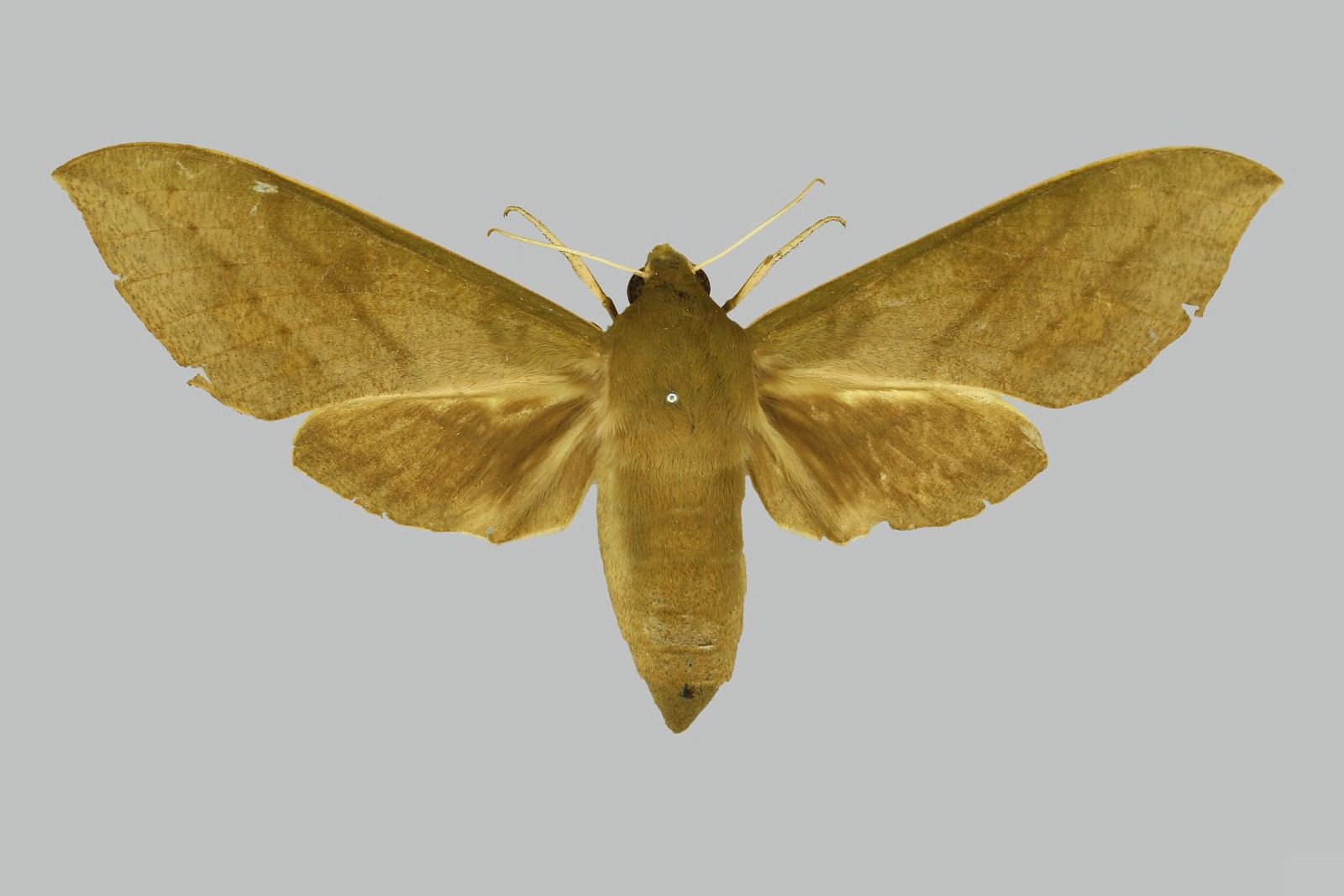
- Theretra jugurtha jugurtha

Scientific classification
- Kingdom: Animalia
- Phylum: Arthropoda
- Class: Insecta
- Order: Lepidoptera
- Family: Sphingidae
- Genus: Theretra
- Species: T. jugurtha

Binomial name
- Theretra jugurtha (Boisduval, 1875)

Synonyms
- Choerocampa jugurtha Boisduval, 1875; Theretra obliterata Rothschild, 1894

= Theretra jugurtha =

Species of moth

Theretra jugurtha is a moth of the family Sphingidae. It is known from the wooded areas in tropical Africa.

The length of the forewings is 37–45 mm.

== Subspecies ==
- Theretra jugurtha jugurtha
- Theretra jugurtha peracuta Darge, 1989 (Bioko Island)
