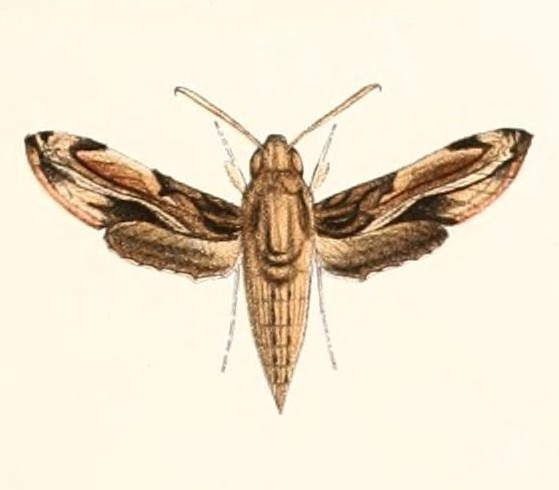

Scientific classification
- Kingdom: Animalia
- Phylum: Arthropoda
- Class: Insecta
- Order: Lepidoptera
- Family: Sphingidae
- Genus: Theretra
- Species: T. orpheus

Binomial name
- Theretra orpheus (Herrich-Schäffer, 1854)

Synonyms
- Chaerocampa orpheus Herrich-Schäffer, 1854; Panacra natalensis Rothschild, 1894; Theretra orpheus megalesia Viette, 1956

= Theretra orpheus =

Species of moth

Theretra orpheus is a moth of the family Sphingidae. It is known from most of Africa.

The length of the forewings is 22–26 mm.

== Subspecies ==
- Theretra orpheus orpheus (woodland and forest from the Cape to East Africa)
- Theretra orpheus gauthieri Darge, 1991 (Príncipe)
- Theretra orpheus intensa Rothschild & Jordan, 1903 (Comoro Islands)
- Theretra orpheus malgassica Clark, 1933 (Madagascar)
- Theretra orpheus pelius Rothschild & Jordan, 1903 (Uganda, Congo to Sierra Leone)
- Theretra orpheus scotinus Rothschild & Jordan, 1915 (Nigeria)
