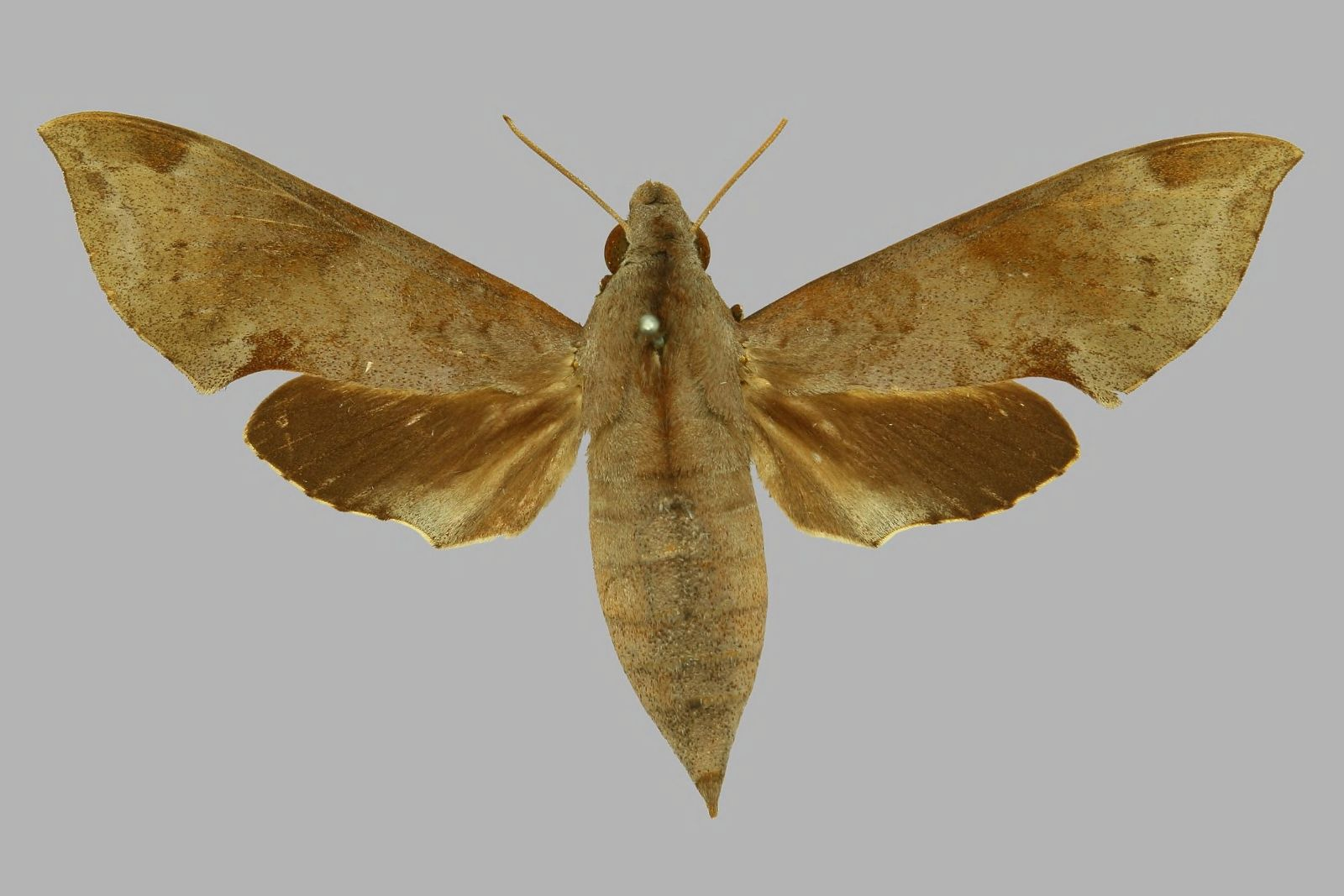

Scientific classification
- Kingdom: Animalia
- Phylum: Arthropoda
- Class: Insecta
- Order: Lepidoptera
- Family: Sphingidae
- Genus: Temnora
- Species: T. livida

Binomial name
- Temnora livida Holland, 1889

Synonyms
- Chaerocampa livida Holland, 1889

= Temnora livida =

Species of moth

Temnora livida is a moth of the family Sphingidae. It is known from forests from the Gambia to Congo and Uganda.

The length of the forewings is 29–34 mm, making it the largest species of the genus Temnora. The head and body are grey, with a dark median line running from the vertex to the base of the abdomen. The forewings are grey with numerous indistinct crenulate dark lines. There is a darker area at the costa near the apex and a squarish dark spot at the inner margin before the tornus. There is also a large, diffuse darker area beyond the middle of the costa. The hindwings are uniformly dark blackish grey with a pale grey spot at the tornus. The abdominal tufts are light red.
