= List of moths of Equatorial Guinea =

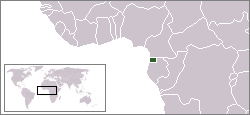
Location of Equatorial Guinea

There are about 420 known moth species of Equatorial Guinea. The moths (mostly nocturnal) and butterflies (mostly diurnal) together make up the taxonomic order Lepidoptera.

This is a list of moth species which have been recorded in Equatorial Guinea.

== Alucitidae ==
- Alucita plumigera (Strand, 1913)

== Anomoeotidae ==
- Anomoeotes leucolena Holland, 1893
- Anomoeotes separatula Strand, 1913
- Anomoeotes tenellula Holland, 1893
- Staphylinochrous heringi Alberti, 1954

== Arctiidae ==
- Afraloa bifurca (Walker, 1855)
- Afrasura indecisa (Walker, 1869)
- Alpenus maculosa (Stoll, 1781)
- Amerila nigroapicalis (Aurivillius, 1900)
- Amerila vidua (Cramer, 1780)
- Anapisa connexa (Walker, 1854)
- Archilema uelleburgensis (Strand, 1912)
- Archithosia costimacula (Mabille, 1878)
- Archithosia flavifrontella (Strand, 1912)
- Archithosia makomensis (Strand, 1912)
- Asura craigii (Holland, 1893)
- Balacra elegans Aurivillius, 1892
- Balacra flavimacula Walker, 1856
- Balacra preussi (Aurivillius, 1904)
- Balacra pulchra Aurivillius, 1892
- Balacra rubricincta Holland, 1893
- Ceryx albimacula (Walker, 1854)
- Cragia distigmata (Hampson, 1901)
- Cyana flammeostrigata Karisch, 2003
- Cyana heidrunae (Hoppe, 2004)
- Cyana torrida (Holland, 1893)
- Dubatolovia neurophaea (Hampson, 1911)
- Epilacydes simulans Butler, 1875
- Euchromia guineensis (Fabricius, 1775)
- Euchromia lethe (Fabricius, 1775)
- Kiriakoffalia guineae (Strand, 1912)
- Metarctia benitensis Holland, 1893
- Nacliodes microsippia Strand, 1912
- Nanna eningae (Plötz, 1880)
- Neuroxena fulleri (Druce, 1883)
- Nyctemera acraeina Druce, 1882
- Nyctemera apicalis (Walker, 1854)
- Nyctemera chromis Druce, 1882
- Nyctemera perspicua (Walker, 1854)
- Ovenna guineacola (Strand, 1912)
- Ovenna subgriseola (Strand, 1912)
- Pseudothyretes nigrita (Kiriakoff, 1961)
- Pseudothyretes rubicundula (Strand, 1912)
- Pusiola celida (Bethune-Baker, 1911)
- Radiarctia lutescens (Walker, 1854)
- Rhipidarctia flaviceps (Hampson, 1898)
- Spilosoma aurantiaca (Holland, 1893)
- Spilosoma rava (Druce, 1898)
- Spilosoma togoensis Bartel, 1903
- Tesma nigrapex (Strand, 1912)

== Brahmaeidae ==
- Dactyloceras canui Bouyer, 2002

== Choreutidae ==
- Brenthia octogemmifera Walsingham, 1897

== Copromorphidae ==
- Rhynchoferella hoppei Mey, 2007

== Cossidae ==
- Eulophonotus elegans (Aurivillius, 1910)
- Holcoceroides ferrugineotincta Strand, 1913
- Oreocossus occidentalis Strand, 1913

== Crambidae ==
- Aethaloessa floridalis (Zeller, 1852)
- Argyractis limalis Viette, 1957
- Botyodes asialis Guenée, 1854
- Bradina sordidalis (Dewitz, 1881)
- Cadarena sinuata (Fabricius, 1781)
- Chilo aleniella (Strand, 1913)
- Cnaphalocrocis poeyalis (Boisduval, 1833)
- Cotachena smaragdina (Butler, 1875)
- Eoophyla alba Mey, 2009
- Eporidia dariusalis Walker, 1859
- Glyphandra biincisalis Karsch, 1900
- Hymenia perspectalis (Hübner, 1796)
- Metoeca foedalis (Guenée, 1854)
- Orphanostigma abruptalis (Walker, 1859)
- Orphanostigma fervidalis (Zeller, 1852)
- Orphanostigma latimarginalis (Walker, 1859)
- Pardomima distortana (Strand, 1913)
- Phostria erebusalis (Hampson, 1898)
- Pyrausta sexplagialis Gaede, 1917
- Spoladea recurvalis (Fabricius, 1775)
- Synclera traducalis (Zeller, 1852)
- Ulopeza alenialis Strand, 1913
- Ulopeza conigeralis Zeller, 1852
- Ulopeza panaresalis (Walker, 1859)
- Zebronia phenice (Cramer, 1780)

== Drepanidae ==
- Epicampoptera difficilis Hering, 1934

== Elachistidae ==
- Cryptolechia viridisignata (Strand, 1913)

== Eupterotidae ==
- Epijana cinerea Holland, 1893
- Epijana cosima (Plötz, 1880)
- Janomima dannfelti (Aurivillius, 1893)
- Stenoglene sulphureotinctus Strand, 1912

== Gelechiidae ==
- Brachmia ditemenitis Meyrick, 1934
- Ptilothyris purpurea Walsingham, 1897

== Geometridae ==
- Aletis helcita (Linnaeus, 1763)
- Asthenotricha amblycoma Prout, 1935
- Asthenotricha fernandi Prout, 1935
- Bathycolpodes semigrisea (Warren, 1897)
- Biston abruptaria (Walker, 1869)
- Biston johannaria (Oberthür, 1913)
- Braueriana karischi Herbulot, 1996
- Chlorodrepana inaequisecta Herbulot, 1999
- Cleora herbuloti D. S. Fletcher, 1967
- Cleora pavlitzkiae (D. S. Fletcher, 1958)
- Collix biokensis Herbulot, 1999
- Collix brevipalpis Herbulot, 1999
- Colocleora smithi (Warren, 1904)
- Comibaena barnsi Prout, 1930
- Conolophia persimilis (Warren, 1905)
- Derambila punctisignata Walker, 1863
- Dioptrochasma ablegata Herbulot, 1996
- Dioptrochasma calderae Herbulot, 1996
- Dioptrochasma mercyi Herbulot, 1956
- Ecpetala camerunica Herbulot, 1988
- Eois alticola (Aurivillius, 1925)
- Epigynopteryx tabitha Warren, 1901
- Epigynopteryx termininota Prout, 1934
- Erastria albosignata (Walker, 1863)
- Ereunetea minor (Holland, 1893)
- Eupithecia calderae Herbulot, 1999
- Eupithecia fernandi Herbulot, 1999
- Eupithecia jeanneli Herbulot, 1953
- Eupithecia karischi Herbulot, 1999
- Eupithecia nigribasis (Warren, 1902)
- Hypochrosis banakaria (Plötz, 1880)
- Hypocoela turpisaria (Swinhoe, 1904)
- Hypomecis nessa Herbulot, 1995
- Hypomecis quaerenda Herbulot, 2000
- Idaea pulveraria (Snellen, 1872)
- Idiodes pectinata (Herbulot, 1966)
- Megadrepana cinerea Holland, 1893
- Melinoessa aemonia (Swinhoe, 1904)
- Melinoessa amplissimata (Walker, 1863)
- Melinoessa asteria Prout, 1934
- Melinoessa croesaria Herrich-Schäffer, 1855
- Menophra bilobata Herbulot, 1995
- Menophra nathaliae Herbulot, 1998
- Mimaletis postica (Walker, 1869)
- Narthecusa tenuiorata Walker, 1862
- Piercia ansorgei (Bethune-Baker, 1913)
- Pingasa dispensata (Walker, 1860)
- Pitthea agenoria Druce, 1890
- Plegapteryx anomalus Herrich-Schäffer, 1856
- Racotis angulosa Herbulot, 1973
- Racotis zebrina Warren, 1899
- Ramopteryx viridimista Karisch, 2001
- Scopula acidalia (Holland, 1894)
- Scopula anoista (Prout, 1915)
- Scopula conspicillaria Karisch, 2001
- Scopula ectopostigma Prout, 1932
- Scopula herbuloti Karisch, 2001
- Scopula karischi Herbulot, 1999
- Scopula laevipennis (Warren, 1897)
- Scopula obliquifascia Herbulot, 1999
- Scopula pyraliata (Warren, 1898)
- Scopula rectisecta Prout, 1920
- Scopula recurvata Herbulot, 1992
- Scopula sordaria Karisch, 2001
- Scopula suda Prout, 1932
- Scopula valentinella Karisch, 2001
- Terina circumdata Walker, 1865
- Terina doleris (Plötz, 1880)
- Thalassodes dentatilinea Prout, 1912
- Victoria perornata Warren, 1898
- Xanthisthisa extrema Herbulot, 1999
- Xanthorhoe ansorgei (Warren, 1899)
- Xanthorhoe heliopharia (Swinhoe, 1904)
- Xanthorhoe tamsi D. S. Fletcher, 1963
- Xenimpia karischi Herbulot, 1996
- Xenostega tincta Warren, 1899
- Xylopteryx dargei Herbulot, 1984
- Xylopteryx elongata Herbulot, 1984
- Zamarada aurolineata Gaede, 1915
- Zamarada bicuspida D. S. Fletcher, 1974
- Zamarada dentigera Warren, 1909
- Zamarada griseola D. S. Fletcher, 1974
- Zamarada ixiaria Swinhoe, 1904
- Zamarada melpomene Oberthür, 1912
- Zamarada paxilla D. S. Fletcher, 1974
- Zamarada platycephala D. S. Fletcher, 1974

== Hyblaeidae ==
- Hyblaea occidentalium Holland, 1894

== Lasiocampidae ==
- Braura ligniclusa (Walker, 1865)
- Braura truncatum (Walker, 1855)
- Catalebeda cuneilinea (Walker, 1856)
- Catalebeda discocellularis Strand, 1912
- Cheligium nigrescens (Aurivillius, 1909)
- Chrysopsyche antennifera Strand, 1912
- Eucraera koellikerii (Dewitz, 1881)
- Filiola occidentale (Strand, 1912)
- Gelo anastella Zolotuhin & Prozorov, 2010
- Gonobombyx angulata Aurivillius, 1893
- Gonometa nysa Druce, 1887
- Lechriolepis nigrivenis Strand, 1912
- Lechriolepis rotunda Strand, 1912
- Lechriolepis tessmanni Strand, 1912
- Leipoxais makomona Strand, 1912
- Leipoxais marginepunctata Holland, 1893
- Leipoxais peraffinis Holland, 1893
- Leipoxais proboscidea (Guérin-Méneville, 1832)
- Leipoxais regularis Strand, 1912
- Leipoxais rufobrunnea Strand, 1912
- Leipoxais siccifolia Aurivillius, 1902
- Mallocampa alenica Strand, 1912
- Mallocampa audea (Druce, 1887)
- Mallocampa punctilimbata Strand, 1912
- Mimopacha brunnea Hering, 1941
- Mimopacha gerstaeckerii (Dewitz, 1881)
- Mimopacha knoblauchii (Dewitz, 1881)
- Odontocheilopteryx maculata Aurivillius, 1905
- Odontocheilopteryx phoneus Hering, 1928
- Odontocheilopteryx pica Gurkovich & Zolotuhin, 2009
- Pachymetana custodita (Strand, 1912)
- Pachymetoides stigmatica (Strand, 1911)
- Pachyna subfascia (Walker, 1855)
- Pachytrina honrathii (Dewitz, 1881)
- Pallastica meloui (Riel, 1909)
- Philotherma spargata (Holland, 1893)
- Pseudometa concava (Strand, 1912)
- Pseudometa punctipennis (Strand, 1912)
- Stoermeriana makomanum (Strand, 1912)
- Stoermeriana tessmanni (Strand, 1912)
- Streblote guineanum (Strand, 1912)
- Streblote splendens (Druce, 1887)
- Trabala aethiopica (Strand, 1912)
- Trabala burchardi (Dewitz, 1881)

== Limacodidae ==
- Andaingo bicolor (Strand, 1913)
- Anilina plebeia (Karsch, 1899)
- Baria elsa (Druce, 1887)
- Casphalia extranea (Walker, 1869)
- Casphalia nigerrima Holland, 1893
- Compactena hilda (Druce, 1887)
- Compactena secta (Strand, 1913)
- Cosuma rugosa Walker, 1855
- Ctenolita anacompa Karsch, 1896
- Ctenolita argyrobapta Karsch, 1899
- Ctenolita epargyra Karsch, 1896
- Hadraphe aprica Karsch, 1899
- Latoia phlebodes (Karsch, 1896)
- Latoia urda (Druce, 1887)
- Latoiola albipuncta (Holland, 1893)
- Niphadolepis argenteobrunnea Strand, 1913
- Niphadolepis quinquestrigata Strand, 1913
- Parasa trapezoidea Aurivillius, 1900
- Perola secunda (Strand, 1913)
- Phorma pepon Karsch, 1896
- Prolatoia sjostedti (Aurivillius, 1897)
- Stroteroides nigrisignata Strand, 1913
- Tryphax uelleburgensis Strand, 1913

== Lymantriidae ==
- Argyrostagma niobe (Weymer, 1896)
- Barobata trocta Karsch, 1895
- Batella muscosa (Holland, 1893)
- Conigephyra citrona (Hering, 1926)
- Dasychira achatina Hering, 1926
- Dasychira albosignata Holland, 1893
- Dasychira allotria Hering, 1926
- Dasychira chlorobasis Hering, 1926
- Dasychira gloveroides Hering, 1926
- Dasychira goodii (Holland, 1893)
- Dasychira laeliopsis Hering, 1926
- Dasychira perfida (Bethune-Baker, 1911)
- Dasychira sagittiphora Hering, 1926
- Dasychira sphalera Hering, 1926
- Dasychira strigidentata Bethune-Baker, 1911
- Euproctilla tesselata (Holland, 1893)
- Euproctis apicipuncta (Holland, 1893)
- Euproctis crocata (Boisduval, 1847)
- Euproctis neavei Tams, 1924
- Euproctis parallela (Holland, 1893)
- Euproctis reutlingeri Holland, 1893
- Euproctis tessmanni Hering, 1926
- Hemerophanes diatoma (Hering, 1926)
- Hemerophanes enos (Druce, 1896)
- Laelia lignicolor Holland, 1893
- Laelia mediofasciata (Hering, 1926)
- Laelia pulcherrima (Hering, 1926)
- Laelia thanatos (Hering, 1926)
- Leucoma luteipes (Walker, 1855)
- Leucoma melanochila (Hering, 1926)
- Leucoperina atroguttata Aurivillius, 1909
- Lymantria vacillans Walker, 1855
- Marbla divisa (Walker, 1855)
- Mylantria xanthospila (Plötz, 1880)
- Neomardara africana (Holland, 1893)
- Olene basalis (Walker, 1855)
- Otroeda hesperia (Cramer, 1779)
- Paramarbla azami (Kheil, 1909)
- Terphothrix lanaria Holland, 1893
- Viridichira cameruna (Aurivillius, 1904)
- Viridichira longistriata (Hering, 1926)

== Metarbelidae ==
- Metarbela pygatula Strand, 1913
- Metarbela quadriguttata Aurivillius, 1925
- Metarbela reticulosana Strand, 1913
- Metarbela stivafer Holland, 1893

== Noctuidae ==
- Achaea ezea (Cramer, 1779)
- Amazonides aleuca Prout
- Anticarsia rubricans (Boisduval, 1833)
- Asota speciosa (Drury, 1773)
- Brithys crini (Fabricius, 1775)
- Callopistria maillardi (Guenée, 1862)
- Callyna decora Walker, 1858
- Carpostalagma viridis (Plötz, 1880)
- Condica conducta (Walker, 1857)
- Cyligramma limacina (Guérin-Méneville, 1832)
- Dysgonia torrida (Guenée, 1852)
- Eudocima divitiosa (Walker, 1869)
- Feliniopsis africana (Schaus & Clements, 1893)
- Feliniopsis annosa (Viette, 1963)
- Feliniopsis baueri Hacker & Fibiger, 2007
- Feliniopsis connivens (Felder & Rogenhofer, 1874)
- Feliniopsis duponti (Laporte, 1974)
- Feliniopsis ivoriensis (Laporte, 1973)
- Feliniopsis karischi Hacker & Fibiger, 2007
- Feliniopsis kobesi Hacker & Fibiger, 2007
- Feliniopsis laportei Hacker & Fibiger, 2007
- Feliniopsis ligniensis (Laporte, 1973)
- Feliniopsis nigribarbata (Hampson, 1908)
- Feliniopsis parvula Hacker & Fibiger, 2007
- Godasa sidae (Fabricius, 1793)
- Heliophisma catocalina Holland, 1894
- Heraclia geryon (Fabricius, 1781)
- Heraclia poggei (Dewitz, 1879)
- Hypena obacerralis Walker, [1859]
- Hypocala dysdamarta A. E. Prout, 1927
- Hypopyra capensis Herrich-Schäffer, 1854
- Mocis frugalis (Fabricius, 1775)
- Mocis undata (Fabricius, 1775)
- Parachalciope benitensis (Holland, 1894)
- Parachalciope euclidicola (Walker, 1858)
- Pseudoarcte melanis (Mabille, 1890)
- Rhanidophora aethiops (Grünberg, 1907)
- Soloe trigutta Walker, 1854
- Soloella guttivaga (Walker, 1854)
- Spodoptera littoralis (Boisduval, 1833)
- Thyas parallelipipeda (Guenée, 1852)

== Nolidae ==
- Aiteta escalerai Kheil, 1909

== Notodontidae ==
- Desmeocraera latifasciata Gaede, 1928
- Desmeocraerula inconspicuana Strand, 1912
- Galanthella arctipennis (Holland, 1893)
- Gargettoscrancia albolineata (Strand, 1912)
- Peratodonta brunnea Aurivillius, 1904
- Peratodonta olivacea Gaede, 1928
- Phalera atrata (Grünberg, 1907)
- Scalmicauda brevipennis (Holland, 1893)
- Scalmicauda tessmanni (Strand, 1911)

== Oecophoridae ==
- Eucleodora plumbipictella Strand, 1913
- Oedematopoda bicoloricornis Strand, 1913

== Psychidae ==
- Clania guineensis Strand, 1913
- Eumeta cervina Druce, 1887
- Eumeta strandi Bourgogne, 1955
- Monda stupida Strand, 1913

== Pterophoridae ==
- Megalorhipida leucodactylus (Fabricius, 1794)
- Megalorhipida tessmanni Strand, 1913
- Platyptilia benitensis Strand, 1913
- Platyptilia molopias Meyrick, 1906
- Platyptilia pygmaeana Strand, 1913
- Platyptiliodes albisignatula (Strand, 1913)
- Pterophorus virgo (Strand, 1913)
- Sphenarches anisodactylus (Walker, 1864)

== Pyralidae ==
- Eldana saccharina Walker, 1865
- Sabormania pia Strand, 1913

== Saturniidae ==
- Bunaeopsis hersilia (Westwood, 1849)
- Goodia hierax Jordan, 1922
- Goodia obscuripennis Strand, 1912
- Holocerina angulata (Aurivillius, 1893)
- Imbrasia obscura (Butler, 1878)
- Lobobunaea phaedusa (Drury, 1782)
- Ludia delegorguei (Boisduval, 1847)
- Ludia tessmanni Strand, 1911
- Micragone lichenodes (Holland, 1893)
- Orthogonioptilum adiegetum Karsch, 1892
- Pselaphelia gemmifera (Butler, 1878)
- Pseudantheraea discrepans (Butler, 1878)

== Sesiidae ==
- Adixoana auripyga Strand, 1913
- Aegeria alenicum (Strand, 1913)
- Chamanthedon brillians (Beutenmüller, 1899)
- Conopia alenicola (Strand, 1913)
- Conopia guineabia (Strand, 1913)
- Macrotarsipus africanus (Beutenmüller, 1899)
- Melittia oedipus Oberthür, 1878
- Vespaegeria typica Strand, 1913

== Sphingidae ==
- Falcatula falcata (Rothschild & Jordan, 1903)
- Neopolyptychus prionites (Rothschild & Jordan, 1916)
- Polyptychoides digitatus (Karsch, 1891)
- Pseudoclanis rhadamistus (Fabricius, 1781)
- Temnora livida (Holland, 1889)

== Thyrididae ==
- Byblisia setipes (Plötz, 1880)
- Heteroschista nigranalis Warren, 1903
- Marmax hyparchus (Cramer, 1779)
- Nemea eugrapha (Hampson, 1906)
- Nemea tamsi Whalley, 1971
- Ninia plumipes (Drury, 1782)
- Rhodoneura sordidula (Plötz, 1880)
- Striglina rothi Warren, 1898
- Striglina strigifera (Strand, 1913)
- Symphleps signicostata (Strand, 1913)
- Trichobaptes auristrigata (Plötz, 1880)

== Tortricidae ==
- Cnephasia quentini Karisch, 2008
- Enarmoniodes praetextana (Walsingham, 1897)
- Goniotorna valentini Karisch, 2008
- Idiothauma africanum Walsingham, 1897
- Lozotaenia basilea Karisch, 2008
- Mictocommosis argus (Walsingham, 1897)
- Pandemis isotetras (Meyrick, 1934)
- Sanguinograptis albardana (Snellen, 1872)
- Tortrix benitonensis Strand, 1913
- Xenosocia oreomontana Karisch, 2008

== Uraniidae ==
- Aploschema albaria (Plötz, 1880)
- Dissoprumna erycinaria (Guenée, 1857)

== Xyloryctidae ==
- Eretmocera alenica Strand, 1913
- Eretmocera benitonis Strand, 1913
- Eretmocera pachypennis Strand, 1913

== Zygaenidae ==
- Metanycles sachtlebeni Alberti, 1954
- Saliunca aurifrons Walker, 1864
- Saliunca flavifrons (Plötz, 1880)
- Saliunca mimetica Jordan, 1907
- Saliunca nkolentangensis Strand, 1913
- Saliunca solora (Plötz, 1880)
- Saliunca styx (Fabricius, 1775)
