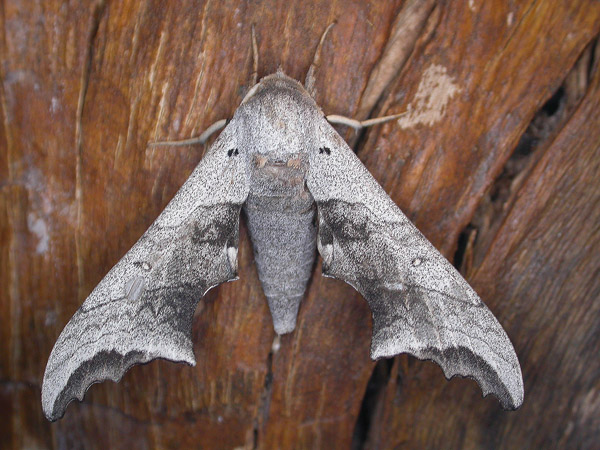

Scientific classification
- Domain: Eukaryota
- Kingdom: Animalia
- Phylum: Arthropoda
- Class: Insecta
- Order: Lepidoptera
- Family: Sphingidae
- Genus: Polyptychoides
- Species: P. assimilis

Binomial name
- Polyptychoides assimilis Rothschild & Jordan, 1903

Synonyms
- Polyptychoides grayii assimilis

= Polyptychoides assimilis =

Species of moth

Polyptychoides assimilis is a moth of the family Sphingidae. It is found in South and East Africa, including Sudan. Some authors consider it to be a subspecies of Polyptychoides grayii.
