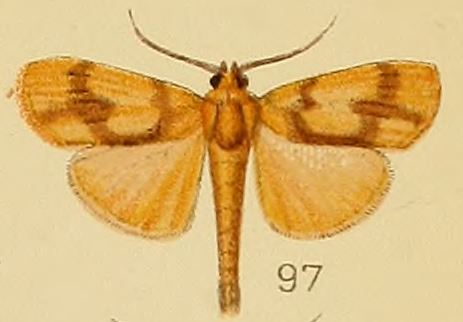
- Ulopeza cruciferalis

Scientific classification
- Kingdom: Animalia
- Phylum: Arthropoda
- Class: Insecta
- Order: Lepidoptera
- Family: Crambidae
- Tribe: Agroterini
- Genus: Ulopeza; Zeller, 1852

Synonyms
- List: Pseudanalthes Warren, 1890; Pseudanaltes Hampson, 1898; Xacca Walker, 1869; Xasca Neave, 1940; Haplochytis Meyrick, 1933

= Ulopeza =

Genus of moths

Ulopeza is a genus of moths of the family Crambidae. It was described by Philipp Christoph Zeller in 1852.

== Species ==
- Ulopeza alenialis Strand, 1913
- Ulopeza conigeralis Zeller, 1852
- Ulopeza crocifrontalis Mabille, 1900
- Ulopeza crocochalca (Meyrick, 1933)
- Ulopeza cruciferalis Kenrick, 1907
- Ulopeza denticulalis Hampson, 1912
- Ulopeza disjunctalis Hampson, 1918
- Ulopeza flavicepsalis Hampson, 1912
- Ulopeza fuscomarginalis (Ghesquière, 1940)
- Ulopeza idyalis (Walker, 1859)
- Ulopeza innotalis Karsch, 1900
- Ulopeza junctilinealis Hampson, 1912
- Ulopeza macilentalis Viette, 1958
- Ulopeza nigricostata Hampson, 1912
- Ulopeza primalis Viette, 1958
- Ulopeza sterictodes Hampson, 1912

=== Former species ===
- Ulopeza cyphoplaca (Meyrick, 1933) transferred to Glyphidomarptis cyphoplaca (Meyrick, 1933)
- Ulopeza panaresalis (Walker, 1859) transferred to Nosophora panaresalis (Walker, 1859)
- Ulopeza pseudohesusalis (Strand, 1920) restored to Pycnarmon pseudohesusalis Strand, 1920
