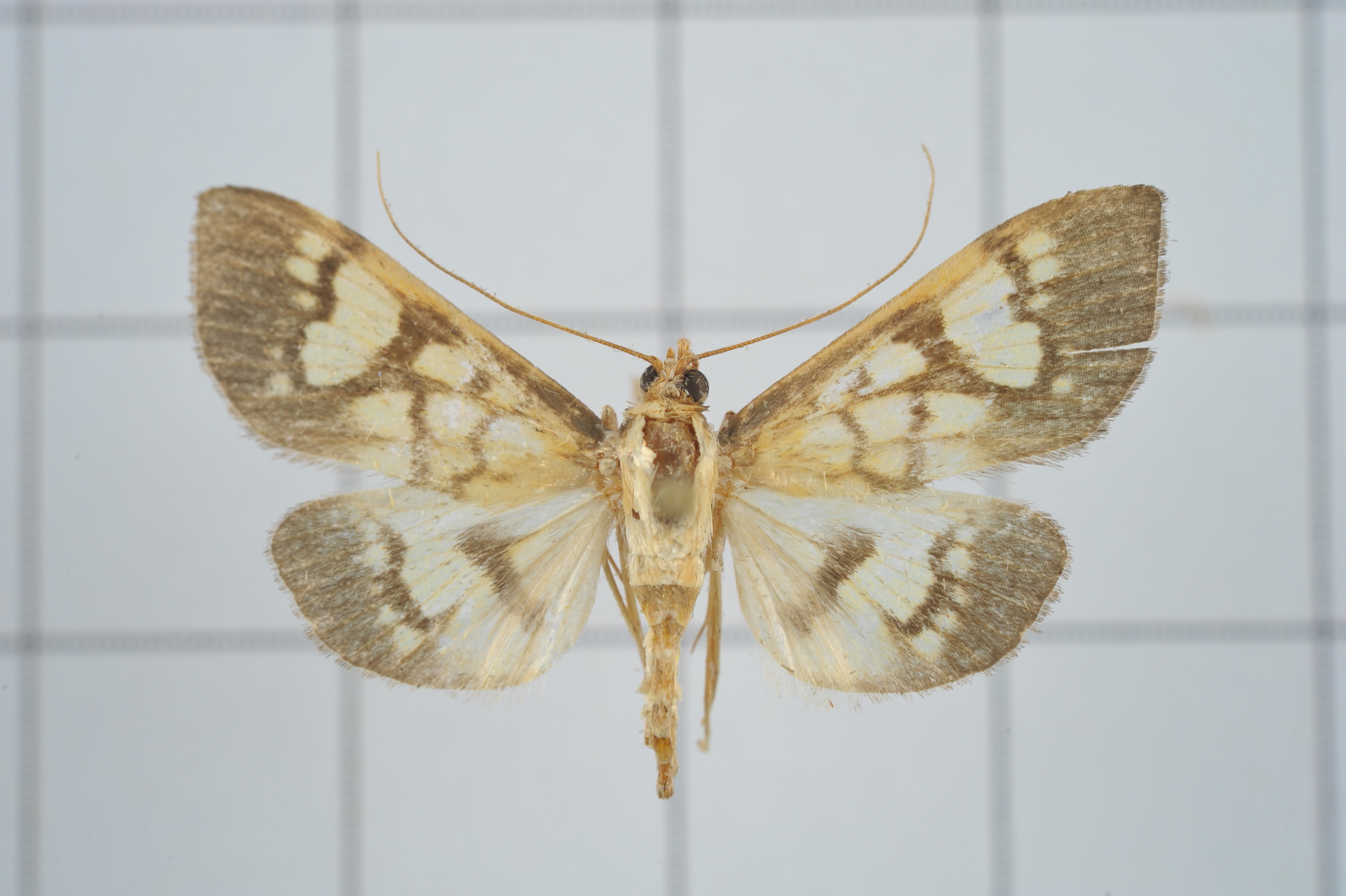

Scientific classification
- Kingdom: Animalia
- Phylum: Arthropoda
- Class: Insecta
- Order: Lepidoptera
- Family: Crambidae
- Genus: Nosophora
- Species: N. euryterminalis

Binomial name
- Nosophora euryterminalis (Hampson, 1918)

Synonyms
- Sylepta euryterminalis Hampson, 1918

= Nosophora euryterminalis =

Species of moth

Nosophora euryterminalis is a species of moth in the family Crambidae. It was described by George Hampson in 1918. It is found in Taiwan, China and Japan.
