= Lophoceps =

Scientific classification
- Kingdom: Animalia
- Phylum: Arthropoda
- Class: Insecta
- Order: Lepidoptera
- Family: Sesiidae
- Tribe: Synanthedonini
- Genus: Lophoceps; Hampson, 1919

Species
- See text

Genus of moths

Lophoceps is a genus of moths in the family Sesiidae.

== Species ==
- Lophoceps abdominalis Hampson, 1919
- Lophoceps alenicola (Strand, [1913])
- Lophoceps quinquepuncta Hampson, 1919
- Lophoceps cyaniris Hampson, 1919
- Lophoceps tetrazona Hampson, 1919
