= Lophoceps quinquepuncta =

Scientific classification
- Kingdom: Animalia
- Phylum: Arthropoda
- Class: Insecta
- Order: Lepidoptera
- Family: Sesiidae
- Genus: Lophoceps
- Species: L. quinquepuncta

Binomial name
- Lophoceps quinquepuncta Hampson, 1919

Species of moth

Lophoceps quinquepuncta is a moth of the family Sesiidae. It is known from Sierra Leone.
