= Ovenna simplex =

Scientific classification
- Domain: Eukaryota
- Kingdom: Animalia
- Phylum: Arthropoda
- Class: Insecta
- Order: Lepidoptera
- Superfamily: Noctuoidea
- Family: Erebidae
- Subfamily: Arctiinae
- Genus: Ovenna
- Species: O. simplex

Binomial name
- Ovenna simplex Birket-Smith, 1965

Species of moth

Ovenna simplex is a moth of the subfamily Arctiinae. It was described by Sven Jorgen R. Birket-Smith in 1965. It is found in Nigeria.
