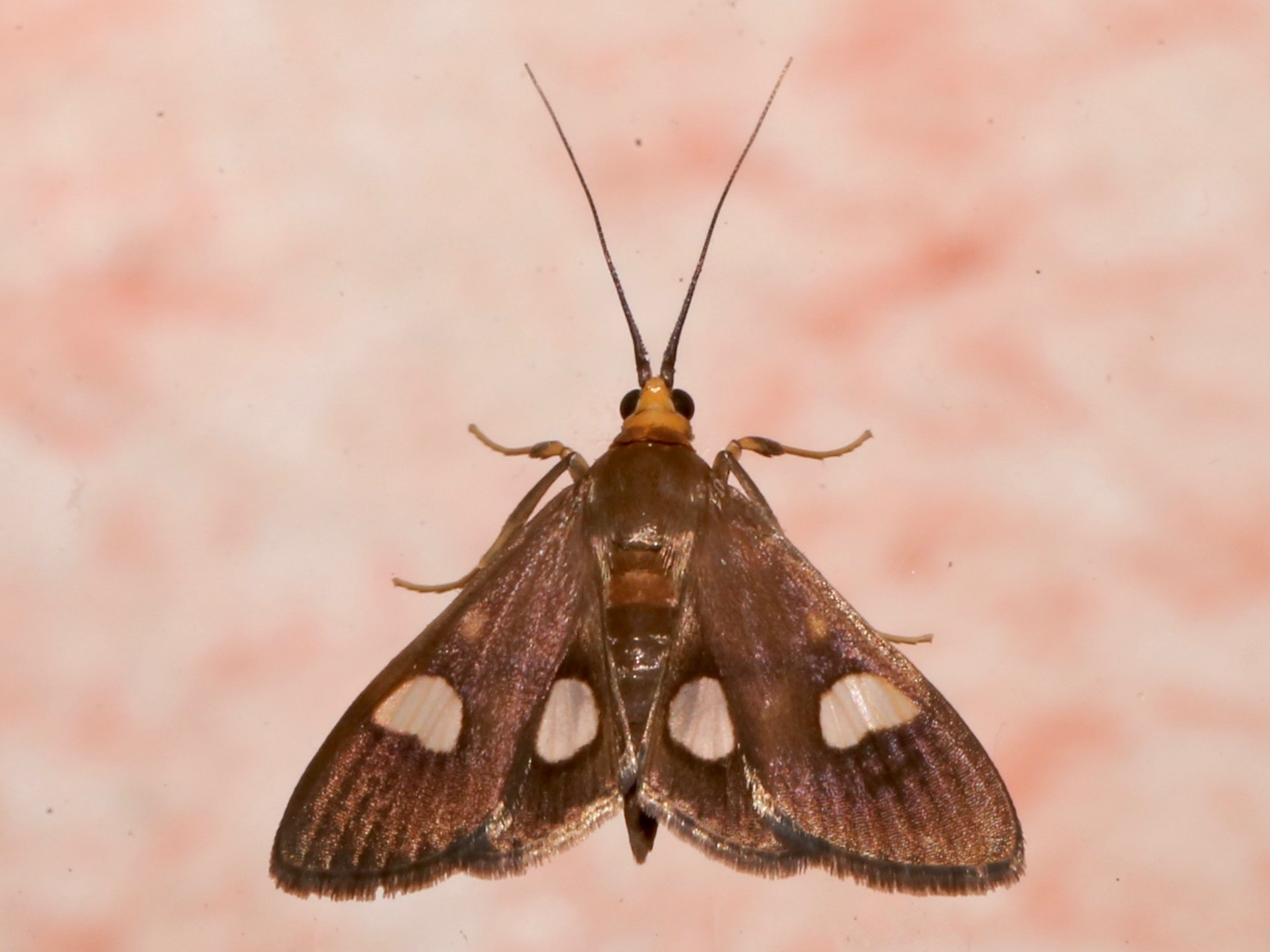

Scientific classification
- Kingdom: Animalia
- Phylum: Arthropoda
- Clade: Pancrustacea
- Class: Insecta
- Order: Lepidoptera
- Family: Crambidae
- Genus: Ulopeza
- Species: U. flavicepsalis

Binomial name
- Ulopeza flavicepsalis Hampson, 1912

= Ulopeza flavicepsalis =

Species of moth

Ulopeza flavicepsalis is a species of moth in the family Crambidae. It was described by George Hampson in 1912. It is found in Mali, Cameroon and the Democratic Republic of the Congo (Équateur Province).

The wingspan is about 24 mm. The forewings are brown, with a large lunulate white postmedial patch between veins 8 and 3. The hindwings are brown, with a large elliptical white postmedial patch between veins 5 and 2.
