= Nosophora ochnodes =

Scientific classification
- Kingdom: Animalia
- Phylum: Arthropoda
- Class: Insecta
- Order: Lepidoptera
- Family: Crambidae
- Genus: Nosophora
- Species: N. ochnodes

Binomial name
- Nosophora ochnodes Meyrick, 1886

Species of moth

Nosophora ochnodes is a moth in the family Crambidae. It was described by Edward Meyrick in 1886. It is found on New Guinea.
