= Ulopeza crocifrontalis =

Scientific classification
- Kingdom: Animalia
- Phylum: Arthropoda
- Class: Insecta
- Order: Lepidoptera
- Family: Crambidae
- Genus: Ulopeza
- Species: U. crocifrontalis

Binomial name
- Ulopeza crocifrontalis Mabille, 1900

Species of moth

Ulopeza crocifrontalis is a species of moth in the family Crambidae. It was described by Paul Mabille in 1900. It is found on Madagascar.

It has a wingspan of 28-29mm.
