= Nosophora glyphodalis =

Scientific classification
- Kingdom: Animalia
- Phylum: Arthropoda
- Class: Insecta
- Order: Lepidoptera
- Family: Crambidae
- Genus: Nosophora
- Species: N. glyphodalis

Binomial name
- Nosophora glyphodalis (Walker, 1866)

Synonyms
- Analtes glyphodalis Walker, 1866

Species of moth

Nosophora glyphodalis is a moth in the family Crambidae. It was described by Francis Walker in 1866. It is found in Indonesia, where it has been recorded from the Sula Islands.
