= Epijana latifasciata =

Scientific classification
- Kingdom: Animalia
- Phylum: Arthropoda
- Class: Insecta
- Order: Lepidoptera
- Family: Eupterotidae
- Genus: Epijana
- Species: E. latifasciata

Binomial name
- Epijana latifasciata Dall'Asta & Poncin, 1980

Species of moth

Epijana latifasciata is a moth in the family Eupterotidae. It was described by Ugo Dall'Asta and G. Poncin in 1980. It is found in the former province of Équateur in the Democratic Republic of the Congo.
