= Ovenna =

Scientific classification
- Domain: Eukaryota
- Kingdom: Animalia
- Phylum: Arthropoda
- Class: Insecta
- Order: Lepidoptera
- Superfamily: Noctuoidea
- Family: Erebidae
- Subfamily: Arctiinae
- Tribe: Lithosiini
- Genus: Ovenna; Birket-Smith, 1965

Genus of moths

Ovenna is a genus of moths in the subfamily Arctiinae.

== Species ==
- Ovenna agonchae Plötz, 1880
- Ovenna guineacola Strand, 1912
- Ovenna hailesellassiei Birket-Smith, 1965
- Ovenna simplex Birket-Smith, 1965
- Ovenna simulans Mabille, 1878
- Ovenna vicaria Walker, 1854
