= Ulopeza macilentalis =

Scientific classification
- Kingdom: Animalia
- Phylum: Arthropoda
- Class: Insecta
- Order: Lepidoptera
- Family: Crambidae
- Genus: Ulopeza
- Species: U. macilentalis

Binomial name
- Ulopeza macilentalis Viette, 1958

Species of moth

Ulopeza macilentalis is a species of moth in the family Crambidae. It was described by Viette in 1958. It is found in Madagascar.
