= Ulopeza denticulalis =

Scientific classification
- Kingdom: Animalia
- Phylum: Arthropoda
- Class: Insecta
- Order: Lepidoptera
- Family: Crambidae
- Genus: Ulopeza
- Species: U. denticulalis

Binomial name
- Ulopeza denticulalis Hampson, 1912

Species of moth

Ulopeza denticulalis is a species of moth in the family Crambidae. It was described by George Hampson in 1912. It is found in South Africa.

== Description ==
The wingspan is about 34 mm. The forewings are red-brown with a dark antemedial line oblique from the costa to the submedian fold, then sinuous. There is a small hyaline bar in the middle of the cell, defined by black. There is also a bifid hyaline discoidal spot defined by black, with a slight hyaline streak above the base of vein 7 and two hyaline points beyond the lower angle of the cell, the costal area above the end of the cell is yellowish to just beyond the postmedial line, which is black, forming the outer edge of the hyaline spots, at vein 2 retracted to below the end of the cell, then sinuous to the inner margin. There is a terminal series of black points. The hindwings are greyish brown with a rather punctiform dark postmedial line bent outwards and minutely dentate between veins 5 and 2. There is a terminal series of dark striae.
