= Polyptychoides cadioui =

Scientific classification
- Domain: Eukaryota
- Kingdom: Animalia
- Phylum: Arthropoda
- Class: Insecta
- Order: Lepidoptera
- Family: Sphingidae
- Genus: Polyptychoides
- Species: P. cadioui

Binomial name
- Polyptychoides cadioui Darge, 2005

Species of moth

Polyptychoides cadioui is a moth of the family Sphingidae. It is known from Tanzania and Kenya.
