= Nosophora fulvalis =

Scientific classification
- Kingdom: Animalia
- Phylum: Arthropoda
- Class: Insecta
- Order: Lepidoptera
- Family: Crambidae
- Genus: Nosophora
- Species: N. fulvalis

Binomial name
- Nosophora fulvalis Hampson, 1898

Species of moth

Nosophora fulvalis is a moth in the family Crambidae. It was described by George Hampson in 1898. It is found in Papua New Guinea, where it has been recorded from Fergusson Island in the D'Entrecasteaux Islands. It is also found on Borneo and in Australia.
