= Ulopeza nigricostata =

Scientific classification
- Kingdom: Animalia
- Phylum: Arthropoda
- Class: Insecta
- Order: Lepidoptera
- Family: Crambidae
- Genus: Ulopeza
- Species: U. nigricostata

Binomial name
- Ulopeza nigricostata Hampson, 1912

Species of moth

Ulopeza nigricostata is a species of moth in the family Crambidae. It was described by George Hampson in 1912. It is found in Nigeria.

== Description ==
The wingspan is about 22 mm. The forewings are orange-yellow, the costa fuscous brown with a cupreous gloss except towards the base, the terminal area broadly fuscous brown with a cupreous gloss. The hindwings are yellow, the terminal area fuscous brown with a cupreous gloss.
