= Nosophora margarita =

Scientific classification
- Kingdom: Animalia
- Phylum: Arthropoda
- Class: Insecta
- Order: Lepidoptera
- Family: Crambidae
- Genus: Nosophora
- Species: N. margarita

Binomial name
- Nosophora margarita Butler, 1887

Species of moth

Nosophora margarita is a moth in the family Crambidae. It was described by Arthur Gardiner Butler in 1887. It is found in the Solomon Islands.
