= Ovenna vicaria =

Ubiquitous footman

Scientific classification
- Kingdom: Animalia
- Phylum: Arthropoda
- Class: Insecta
- Order: Lepidoptera
- Superfamily: Noctuoidea
- Family: Erebidae
- Subfamily: Arctiinae
- Genus: Ovenna
- Species: O. vicaria

Binomial name
- Ovenna vicaria (Walker, 1854)

Synonyms
- Lithosia vicaria Walker, 1854; Brunia vicaria; Lithosia imitans Mabille, 1878; Eilema desiccata Kiriakoff, 1954

Species of moth

Ovenna vicaria, the ubiquitous footman, is a moth of the subfamily Arctiinae. It was described by Francis Walker in 1854. It is found in Africa, where it has been recorded from Angola, Cameroon, the Republic of the Congo, the Democratic Republic of the Congo, Guinea, Lesotho, Malawi, Mozambique, Nigeria, South Africa, Uganda and Zambia. Records from the Oriental region refer to Brunia antica.
