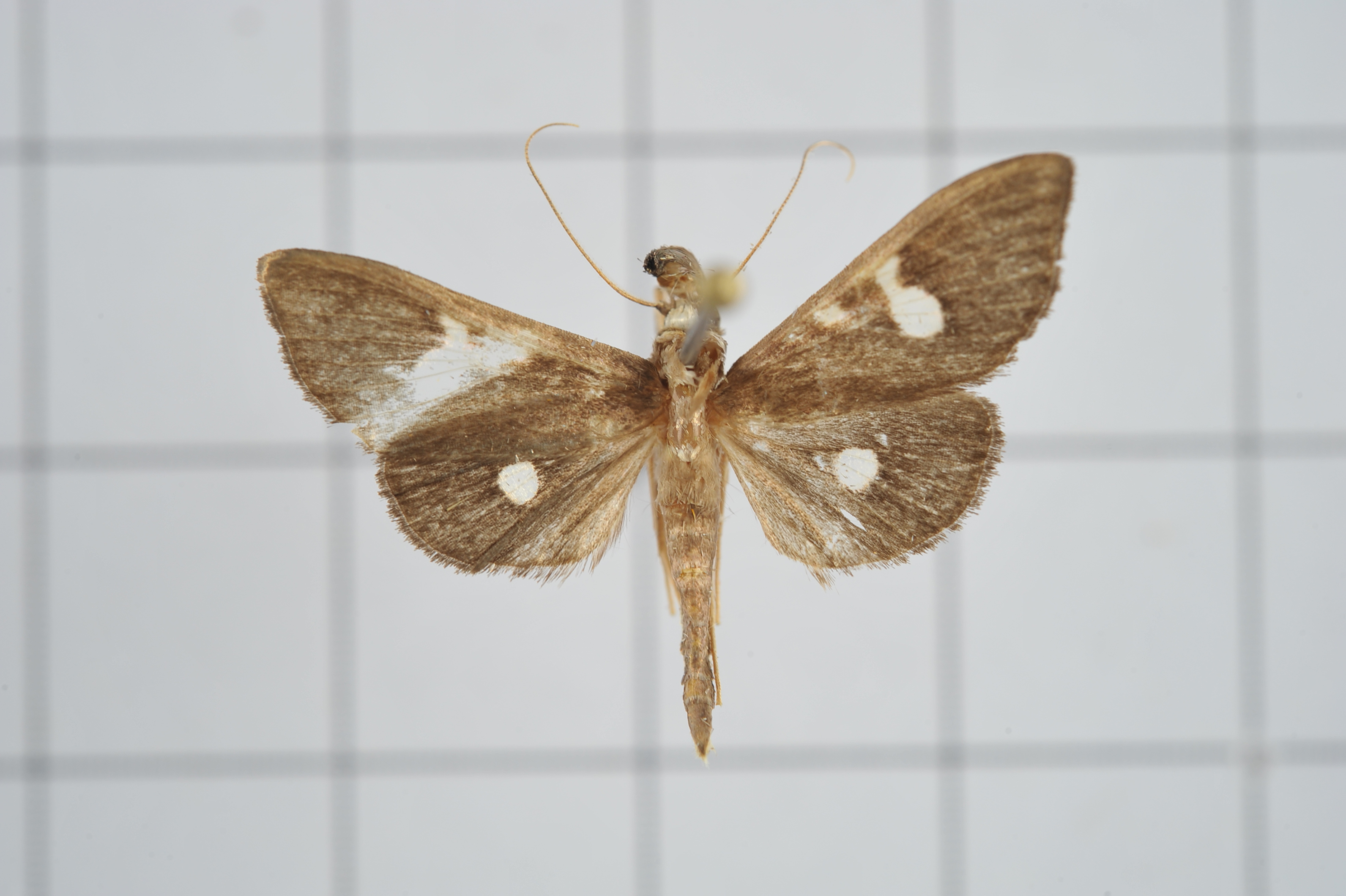

Scientific classification
- Kingdom: Animalia
- Phylum: Arthropoda
- Class: Insecta
- Order: Lepidoptera
- Family: Crambidae
- Genus: Nosophora
- Species: N. taihokualis

Binomial name
- Nosophora taihokualis Strand, 1918

= Nosophora taihokualis =

Species of moth

Nosophora taihokualis is a moth in the family Crambidae. It was described by Strand in 1918. It is found in Taiwan.
