= Nosophora bisexualis =

Scientific classification
- Kingdom: Animalia
- Phylum: Arthropoda
- Class: Insecta
- Order: Lepidoptera
- Family: Crambidae
- Genus: Nosophora
- Species: N. bisexualis

Binomial name
- Nosophora bisexualis Hampson, 1912

Species of moth

Nosophora bisexualis is a moth in the family Crambidae. It was described by George Hampson in 1912. It is found on the Solomon Islands.
