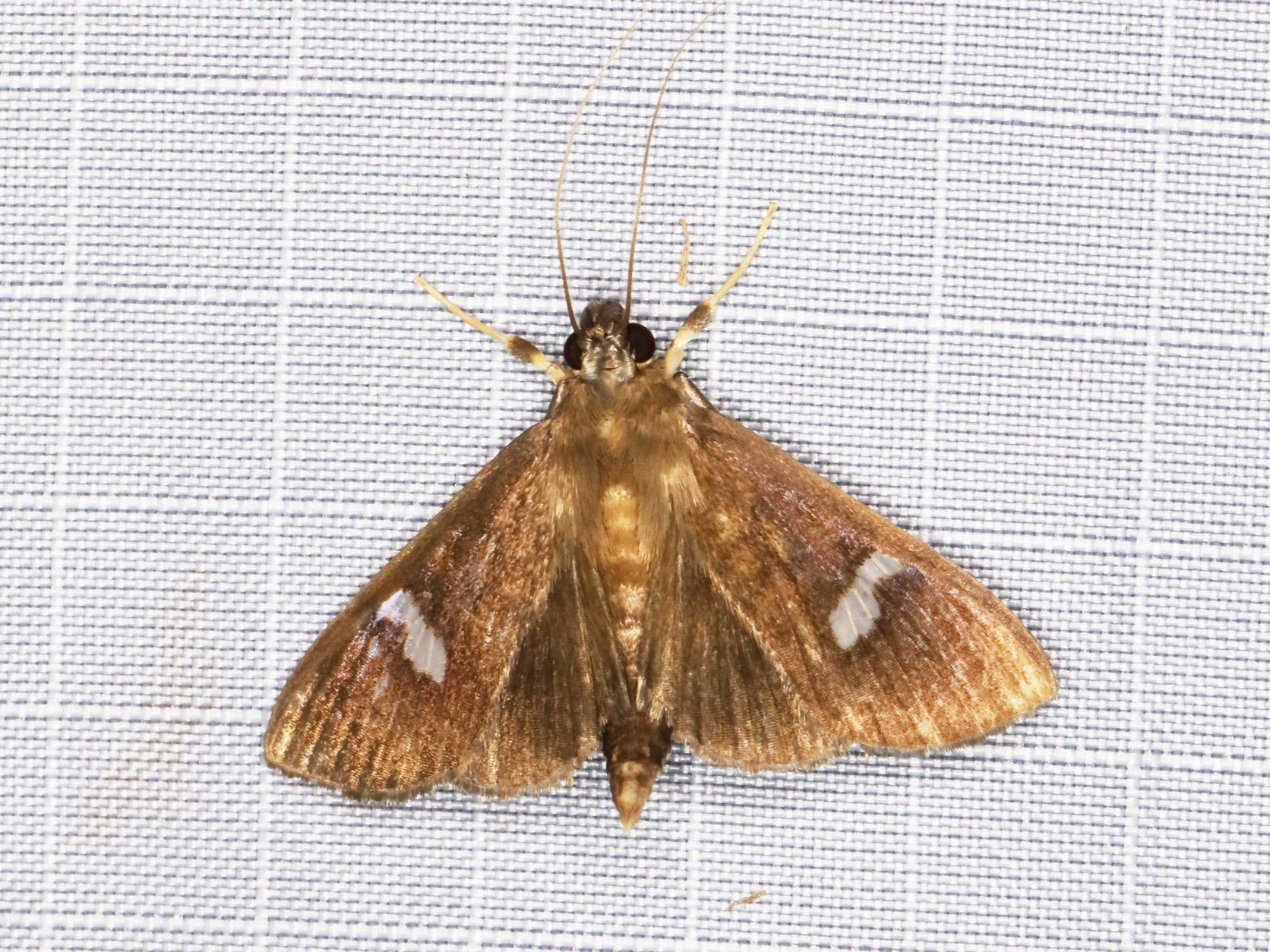

Scientific classification
- Kingdom: Animalia
- Phylum: Arthropoda
- Class: Insecta
- Order: Lepidoptera
- Family: Crambidae
- Genus: Nosophora
- Species: N. albiguttalis

Binomial name
- Nosophora albiguttalis C. Swinhoe, 1890

= Nosophora albiguttalis =

Species of moth

Nosophora albiguttalis is a species of moth in the family Crambidae. It was described by Charles Swinhoe in 1890. It is found in Myanmar.
