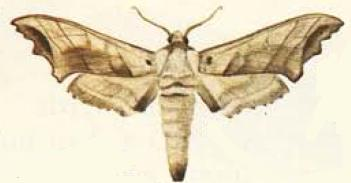
- Polyptychoides grayii

Scientific classification
- Kingdom: Animalia
- Phylum: Arthropoda
- Clade: Pancrustacea
- Class: Insecta
- Order: Lepidoptera
- Family: Sphingidae
- Tribe: Smerinthini
- Genus: Polyptychoides; Carcasson, 1968

= Polyptychoides =

Genus of moths

Polyptychoides is a genus of moths in the family Sphingidae erected by Robert Herbert Carcasson in 1968.

== Species ==
- Polyptychoides afarissaque Darge, 2004
- Polyptychoides assimilis Rothschild & Jordan 1903
- Polyptychoides cadioui Darge, 2005
- Polyptychoides digitatus (Karsch 1891)
- Polyptychoides erosus (Jordan 1923)
- Polyptychoides grayii (Walker 1856)
- Polyptychoides insulanus Darge, 2004
- Polyptychoides mbarikensis Darge & Minetti, 2005
- Polyptychoides niloticus (Jordan 1921)
- Polyptychoides obtusus Darge, 2004
- Polyptychoides politzari Darge & Basquin, 2005
- Polyptychoides ruaha Darge, 2004
- Polyptychoides septentrionalis Darge, 2004
- Polyptychoides vuattouxi Pierre 1989
