= Polyptychoides politzari =

Scientific classification
- Kingdom: Animalia
- Phylum: Arthropoda
- Clade: Pancrustacea
- Class: Insecta
- Order: Lepidoptera
- Family: Sphingidae
- Genus: Polyptychoides
- Species: P. politzari

Binomial name
- Polyptychoides politzari Darge & Basquin, 2005

Species of moth

Polyptychoides politzari is a moth of the family Sphingidae. It is known from the Meru Forest in Kenya.
