= Nosophora tripunctalis =

Scientific classification
- Kingdom: Animalia
- Phylum: Arthropoda
- Class: Insecta
- Order: Lepidoptera
- Family: Crambidae
- Genus: Nosophora
- Species: N. tripunctalis

Binomial name
- Nosophora tripunctalis (Pagenstecher, 1884)

Synonyms
- Analtes tripunctalis Pagenstecher, 1884

Species of moth

Nosophora tripunctalis is a moth in the family Crambidae. It was described by Pagenstecher in 1884. It is found in Indonesia (Ambon Island).
