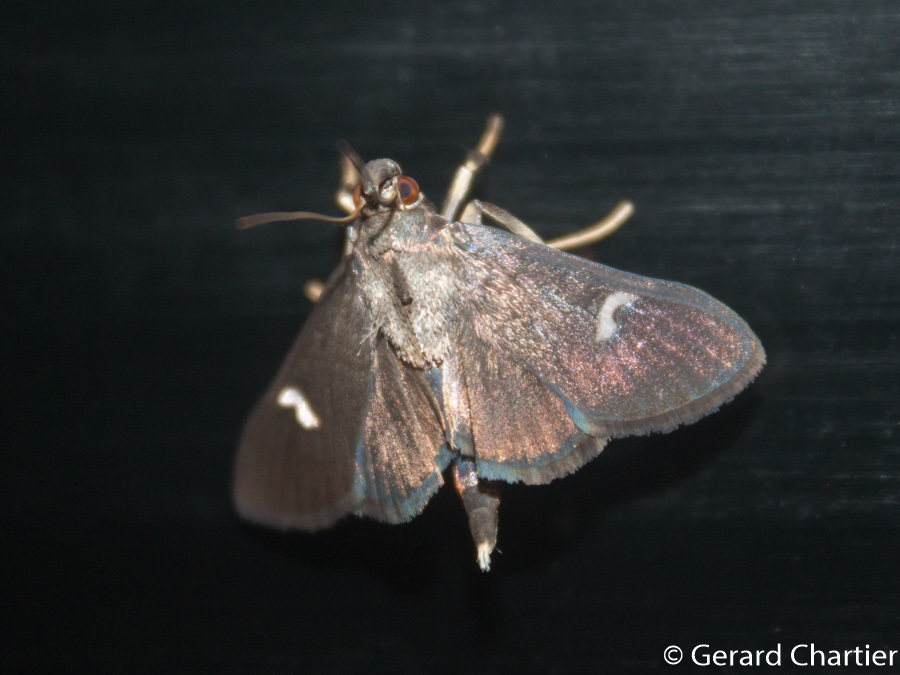

Scientific classification
- Kingdom: Animalia
- Phylum: Arthropoda
- Class: Insecta
- Order: Lepidoptera
- Family: Crambidae
- Genus: Nosophora
- Species: N. dispilalis

Binomial name
- Nosophora dispilalis Hampson, 1896

Synonyms
- Botys chironalis Walker, 1859

= Nosophora dispilalis =

Species of moth

Nosophora dispilalis is a species of moth in the family Crambidae. It was described by George Hampson in 1896. It is found on Borneo, Ambon Island and in India (Assam) and Australia.
