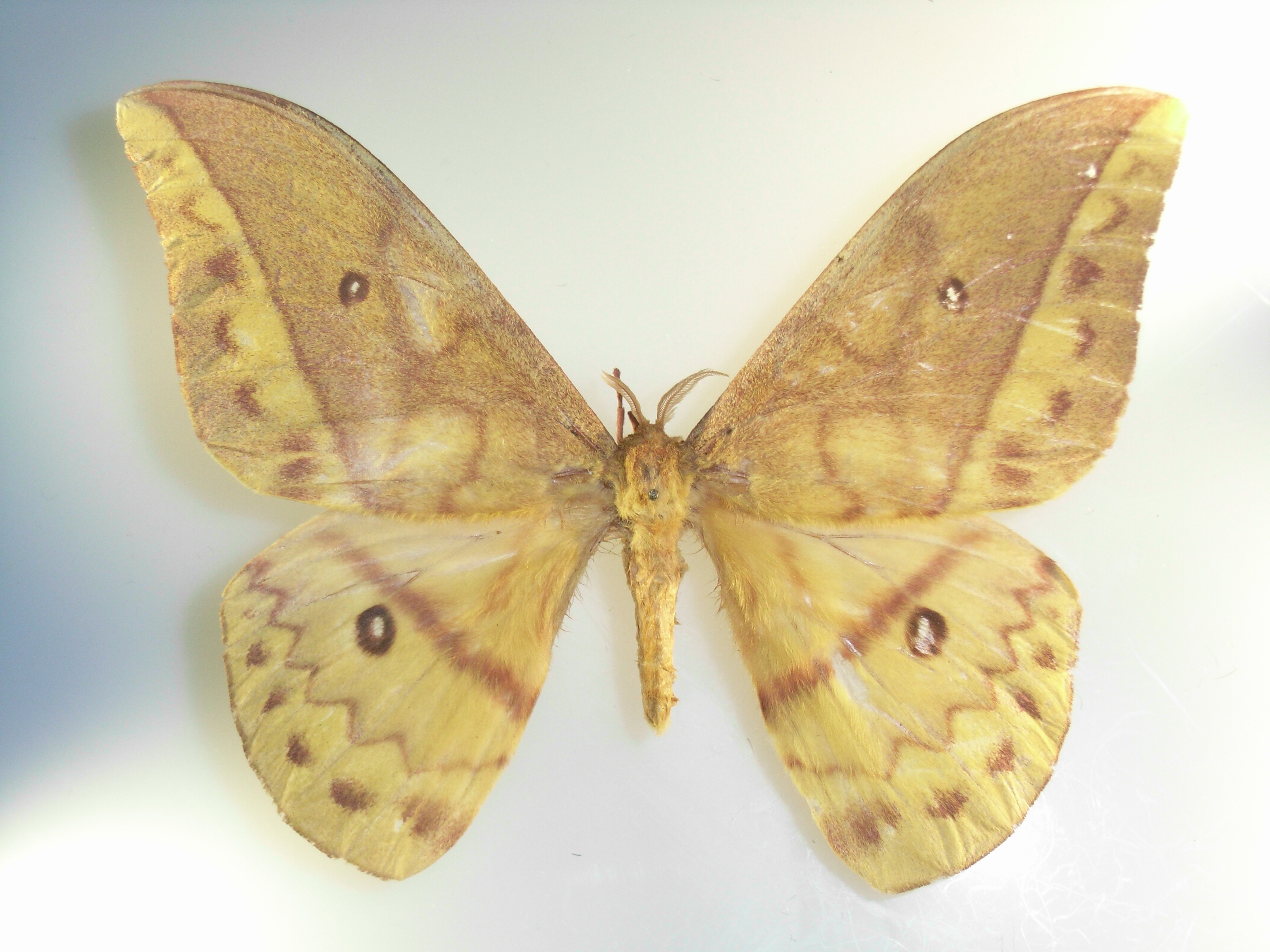

Scientific classification
- Kingdom: Animalia
- Phylum: Arthropoda
- Class: Insecta
- Order: Lepidoptera
- Family: Saturniidae
- Subfamily: Saturniinae
- Genus: Pseudantheraea; Weymer, 1892

= Pseudantheraea =

Genus of moths

Pseudantheraea is a genus of moths in the family Saturniidae first described by Weymer in 1892.

== Species ==
- Pseudantheraea discrepans (Butler, 1878)
- Pseudantheraea imperator Rougeot, 1962
