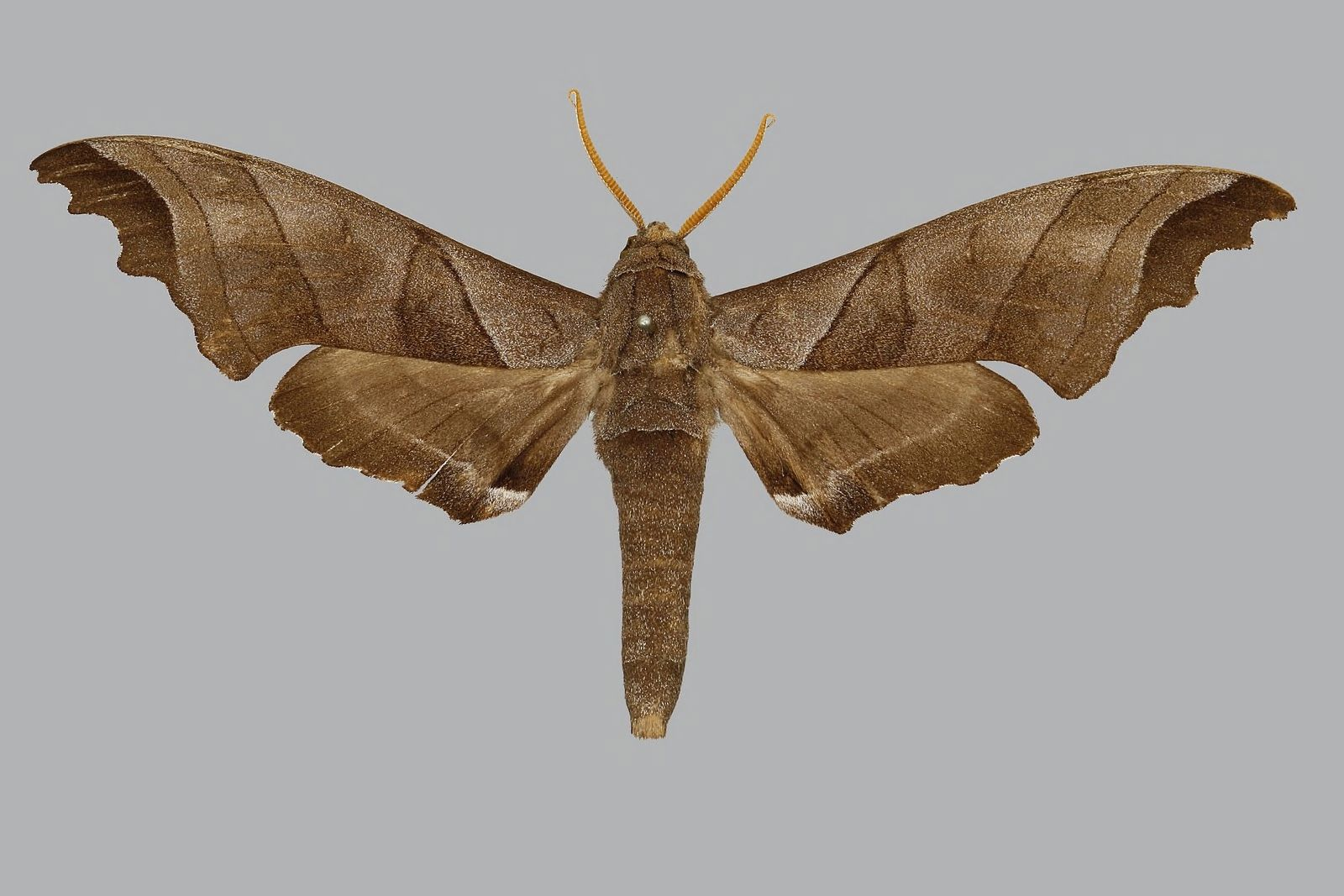

Scientific classification
- Domain: Eukaryota
- Kingdom: Animalia
- Phylum: Arthropoda
- Class: Insecta
- Order: Lepidoptera
- Family: Sphingidae
- Genus: Polyptychoides
- Species: P. vuattouxi

Binomial name
- Polyptychoides vuattouxi Pierre, 1989

= Polyptychoides vuattouxi =

Species of moth

Polyptychoides vuattouxi is a moth of the family Sphingidae. It is known from Sierra Leone, Ivory Coast and Ghana.
