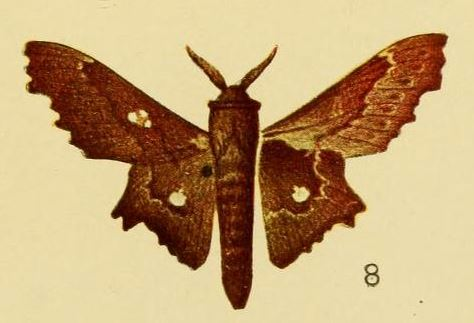

Scientific classification
- Domain: Eukaryota
- Kingdom: Animalia
- Phylum: Arthropoda
- Class: Insecta
- Order: Lepidoptera
- Family: Lasiocampidae
- Genus: Mimopacha
- Species: M. tripunctata

Binomial name
- Mimopacha tripunctata Aurivillius, 1905

= Mimopacha tripunctata =

Species of moth

Mimopacha tripunctata is a species of moth in the family Lasiocampidae described by Per Olof Christopher Aurivillius in 1905.

This species has a wingspan of 43 mm.

== Distribution ==
It is known from Nigeria, Kenya, Uganda and Tanzania.
