= Nosophora maculalis =

Scientific classification
- Kingdom: Animalia
- Phylum: Arthropoda
- Class: Insecta
- Order: Lepidoptera
- Family: Crambidae
- Genus: Nosophora
- Species: N. maculalis

Binomial name
- Nosophora maculalis (Leech, 1889)

Synonyms
- Sylepta maculalis Leech, 1889; Perinephile doerriesi Staudinger, 1892

Species of moth

Nosophora maculalis is a moth in the family Crambidae. It was described by John Henry Leech in 1889. It is found in Japan, the Russian Far East and China.
