= Ulopeza disjunctalis =

Scientific classification
- Kingdom: Animalia
- Phylum: Arthropoda
- Class: Insecta
- Order: Lepidoptera
- Family: Crambidae
- Genus: Ulopeza
- Species: U. disjunctalis

Binomial name
- Ulopeza disjunctalis Hampson, 1918

Species of moth

Ulopeza disjunctalis is a species of moth in the family Crambidae. It was described by George Hampson in 1918. It is found in Cameroon.
