= Ulopeza crocochalca =

Scientific classification
- Kingdom: Animalia
- Phylum: Arthropoda
- Clade: Pancrustacea
- Class: Insecta
- Order: Lepidoptera
- Family: Crambidae
- Genus: Ulopeza
- Species: U. crocochalca

Binomial name
- Ulopeza crocochalca (Meyrick, 1933)

Synonyms
- Haplochytis crocochalca Meyrick, 1933

Species of moth

Ulopeza crocochalca is a species of moth in the family Crambidae. It was described by Snellen in 1880. It is found in the Democratic Republic of Congo.
