= Epijana =

Scientific classification
- Kingdom: Animalia
- Phylum: Arthropoda
- Class: Insecta
- Order: Lepidoptera
- Family: Eupterotidae
- Subfamily: Janinae
- Genus: Epijana; Holland, 1893

Genus of moths

Epijana is a genus of moths in the family Eupterotidae.

== Species ==
- Epijana cinerea Holland, 1893
- Epijana cosima Plötz, 1880
- Epijana latifasciata Dall'Asta & Poncin, 1980
- Epijana meridionalis Dall'Asta & Poncin, 1980
