= Polyptychoides mbarikensis =

Scientific classification
- Domain: Eukaryota
- Kingdom: Animalia
- Phylum: Arthropoda
- Class: Insecta
- Order: Lepidoptera
- Family: Sphingidae
- Genus: Polyptychoides
- Species: P. mbarikensis

Binomial name
- Polyptychoides mbarikensis Darge & Minetti, 2005

Species of moth

Polyptychoides mbarikensis is a moth of the family Sphingidae. It is known from the Mbaraki Mountains in the Morogoro Province of Tanzania.
