= Ovenna simulans =

Scientific classification
- Domain: Eukaryota
- Kingdom: Animalia
- Phylum: Arthropoda
- Class: Insecta
- Order: Lepidoptera
- Superfamily: Noctuoidea
- Family: Erebidae
- Subfamily: Arctiinae
- Genus: Ovenna
- Species: O. simulans

Binomial name
- Ovenna simulans (Mabille, 1878)

Synonyms
- Lithosia simulans Mabille, 1879

Species of moth

Ovenna simulans is a moth of the subfamily Arctiinae. It was described by Paul Mabille in 1878. It is found in Angola, Cameroon, the Democratic Republic of the Congo and South Africa.
