= Nosophora quadrisignata =

Scientific classification
- Kingdom: Animalia
- Phylum: Arthropoda
- Class: Insecta
- Order: Lepidoptera
- Family: Crambidae
- Genus: Nosophora
- Species: N. quadrisignata

Binomial name
- Nosophora quadrisignata Moore, 1884

Species of moth

Nosophora quadrisignata is a moth in the family Crambidae. It was described by Frederic Moore in 1884. It is found in Sri Lanka.
