= Ulopeza innotalis =

Scientific classification
- Kingdom: Animalia
- Phylum: Arthropoda
- Clade: Pancrustacea
- Class: Insecta
- Order: Lepidoptera
- Family: Crambidae
- Genus: Ulopeza
- Species: U. innotalis

Binomial name
- Ulopeza innotalis Karsch, 1900

Species of moth

Ulopeza innotalis is a species of moth in the family Crambidae. It was described by Ferdinand Karsch in 1900. It is found in Western Africa.
