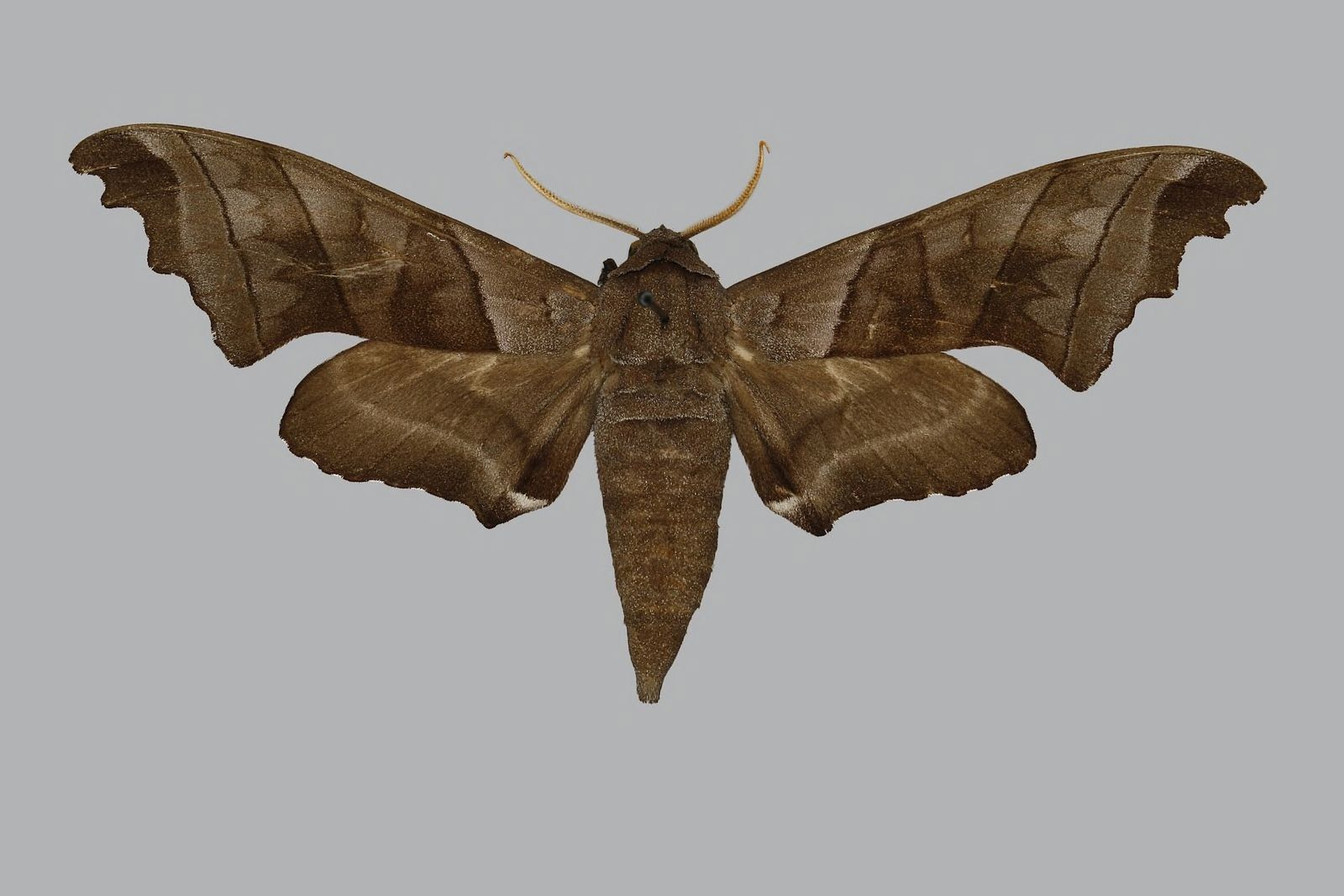

Scientific classification
- Domain: Eukaryota
- Kingdom: Animalia
- Phylum: Arthropoda
- Class: Insecta
- Order: Lepidoptera
- Family: Sphingidae
- Genus: Polyptychoides
- Species: P. erosus

Binomial name
- Polyptychoides erosus (Jordan, 1923)

Synonyms
- Polyptychus erosus Jordan, 1923

= Polyptychoides erosus =

Species of moth

Polyptychoides erosus is a moth of the family Sphingidae. It is known from highland forest in Kenya and Tanzania, east of the Rift Valley.

The length of the forewings is 35–41 mm for males and about 53 mm for females.
