= Lophoceps abdominalis =

Scientific classification
- Kingdom: Animalia
- Phylum: Arthropoda
- Class: Insecta
- Order: Lepidoptera
- Family: Sesiidae
- Genus: Lophoceps
- Species: L. abdominalis

Binomial name
- Lophoceps abdominalis Hampson, 1919

Species of moth

Lophoceps abdominalis is a moth of the family Sesiidae. It is known from Kenya.
