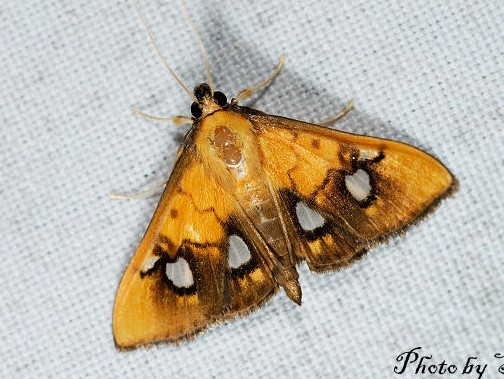

Scientific classification
- Kingdom: Animalia
- Phylum: Arthropoda
- Class: Insecta
- Order: Lepidoptera
- Family: Crambidae
- Genus: Nosophora
- Species: N. semitritalis

Binomial name
- Nosophora semitritalis (Lederer, 1863)

Synonyms
- Analthes semitritalis Lederer, 1863

= Nosophora semitritalis =

Species of moth

Nosophora semitritalis is a species of moth in the family Crambidae. It was described by Julius Lederer in 1863. It is found in China, Thailand, Taiwan and Japan.
