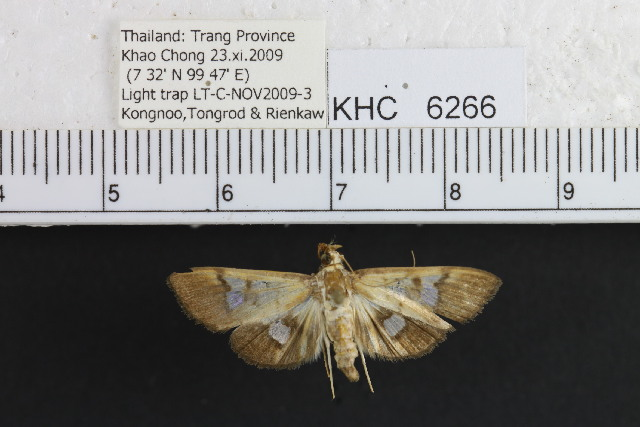
- Nosophora semitritalis

Scientific classification
- Kingdom: Animalia
- Phylum: Arthropoda
- Clade: Pancrustacea
- Class: Insecta
- Order: Lepidoptera
- Family: Crambidae
- Subfamily: Spilomelinae
- Tribe: Agroterini
- Genus: Nosophora; Lederer, 1863

Synonyms
- Analthes Lederer, 1863; Analtes Lederer, 1863; Eidama Walker, 1866

= Nosophora =

Genus of moths

Nosophora is a genus of moths in the family Crambidae.

== Species ==
- Nosophora albiguttalis Swinhoe, 1890
- Nosophora barbata Hampson, 1899
- Nosophora bisexualis Hampson, 1912
- Nosophora dispilalis Hampson, 1896
- Nosophora euryterminalis (Hampson, 1918)
- Nosophora euspilalis (Walker, 1866)
- Nosophora flavibasalis Hampson, 1899
- Nosophora fulvalis Hampson, 1898
- Nosophora glyphodalis (Walker, 1866)
- Nosophora hypsalis Walker, [1866]
- Nosophora incomitata (Swinhoe, 1894)
- Nosophora insignis (Butler, 1881)
- Nosophora maculalis (Leech, 1889)
- Nosophora margarita Butler, 1887
- Nosophora mesosticta Hampson, 1912
- Nosophora nubilis C. Felder, R. Felder & Rogenhofer, 1875
- Nosophora obliqualis (Hampson, 1893)
- Nosophora ochnodes Meyrick, 1886
- Nosophora panaresalis (Walker, 1859)
- Nosophora parvipunctalis Hampson, 1896
- Nosophora quadrisignata Moore, 1884
- Nosophora semitritalis (Lederer, 1863)
- Nosophora taihokualis Strand, 1918
- Nosophora tripunctalis (Pagenstecher, 1884)
- Nosophora unipunctalis (Pagenstecher, 1884)
