= Polyptychoides ruaha =

Scientific classification
- Kingdom: Animalia
- Phylum: Arthropoda
- Class: Insecta
- Order: Lepidoptera
- Family: Sphingidae
- Genus: Polyptychoides
- Species: P. ruaha

Binomial name
- Polyptychoides ruaha Darge, 2004

Species of moth

Polyptychoides ruaha is a moth of the family line Sphingidae. It is known from Tanzania.
