= Nosophora unipunctalis =

Scientific classification
- Kingdom: Animalia
- Phylum: Arthropoda
- Class: Insecta
- Order: Lepidoptera
- Family: Crambidae
- Genus: Nosophora
- Species: N. unipunctalis

Binomial name
- Nosophora unipunctalis (Pagenstecher, 1884)

Synonyms
- Analtes unipunctalis Pagenstecher, 1884

Species of moth

Nosophora unipunctalis is a moth in the family Crambidae. It was described by Pagenstecher in 1884. It is found in Indonesia (Ambon Island).
