= Polyptychoides obtusus =

Scientific classification
- Domain: Eukaryota
- Kingdom: Animalia
- Phylum: Arthropoda
- Class: Insecta
- Order: Lepidoptera
- Family: Sphingidae
- Genus: Polyptychoides
- Species: P. obtusus

Binomial name
- Polyptychoides obtusus Darge, 2004

Species of moth

Polyptychoides obtusus is a moth of the family Sphingidae. It is known from Tanzania.
