= Nosophora incomitata =

Scientific classification
- Kingdom: Animalia
- Phylum: Arthropoda
- Class: Insecta
- Order: Lepidoptera
- Family: Crambidae
- Genus: Nosophora
- Species: N. incomitata

Binomial name
- Nosophora incomitata (C. Swinhoe, 1894)

Synonyms
- Nagia incomitata C. Swinhoe, 1894; Nosophora triguttalis Warren, 1896

Species of moth

Nosophora incomitata is a moth in the family Crambidae. It was described by Charles Swinhoe in 1894. It is found in India.
