= Nosophora hypsalis =

Scientific classification
- Kingdom: Animalia
- Phylum: Arthropoda
- Class: Insecta
- Order: Lepidoptera
- Family: Crambidae
- Genus: Nosophora
- Species: N. hypsalis

Binomial name
- Nosophora hypsalis (Walker, [1866])

Synonyms
- Eidama hypsalis Walker, [1866]

Species of moth

Nosophora hypsalis is a moth in the family Crambidae. It was described by Francis Walker in 1866. It is found in the Aru Islands of Indonesia and Australia, where it has been recorded from Queensland.

Adults are brown with a dark-edged transparent spot on the wings.
