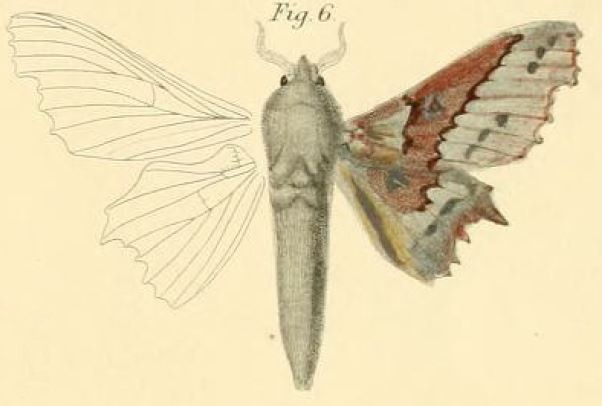
- Mimopacha gerstaeckerii

Scientific classification
- Domain: Eukaryota
- Kingdom: Animalia
- Phylum: Arthropoda
- Class: Insecta
- Order: Lepidoptera
- Family: Lasiocampidae
- Subfamily: Lasiocampinae
- Genus: Mimopacha; Aurivillius, 1905

Synonyms
- Libyopacha Clos, 1920

= Mimopacha =

Genus of moths

Mimopacha is a genus of moths in the family Lasiocampidae. The genus was erected by Per Olof Christopher Aurivillius in 1905.

== Species ==
Some species of this genus are:

- Mimopacha audeoudi Romieux, 1935
- Mimopacha brunnea Hering, 1941
- Mimopacha bryki Aurivillius, 1927
- Mimopacha cinerascens (Holland, 1893)
- Mimopacha excavata Hering, 1935
- Mimopacha gerstaeckerii (Dewitz, 1881)
- Mimopacha jordani Tams, 1936
- Mimopacha knoblauchii (Dewitz, 1881)
- Mimopacha pelodis Hering, 1928
- Mimopacha rotundata Hering, 1941
- Mimopacha similis Hering, 1935
- Mimopacha tripunctata (Aurivillius, 1905)
