= Polyptychoides septentrionalis =

Scientific classification
- Domain: Eukaryota
- Kingdom: Animalia
- Phylum: Arthropoda
- Class: Insecta
- Order: Lepidoptera
- Family: Sphingidae
- Genus: Polyptychoides
- Species: P. septentrionalis

Binomial name
- Polyptychoides septentrionalis Darge, 2004

Species of moth

Polyptychoides septentrionalis is a moth of the family Sphingidae. It is known from Kenya.
