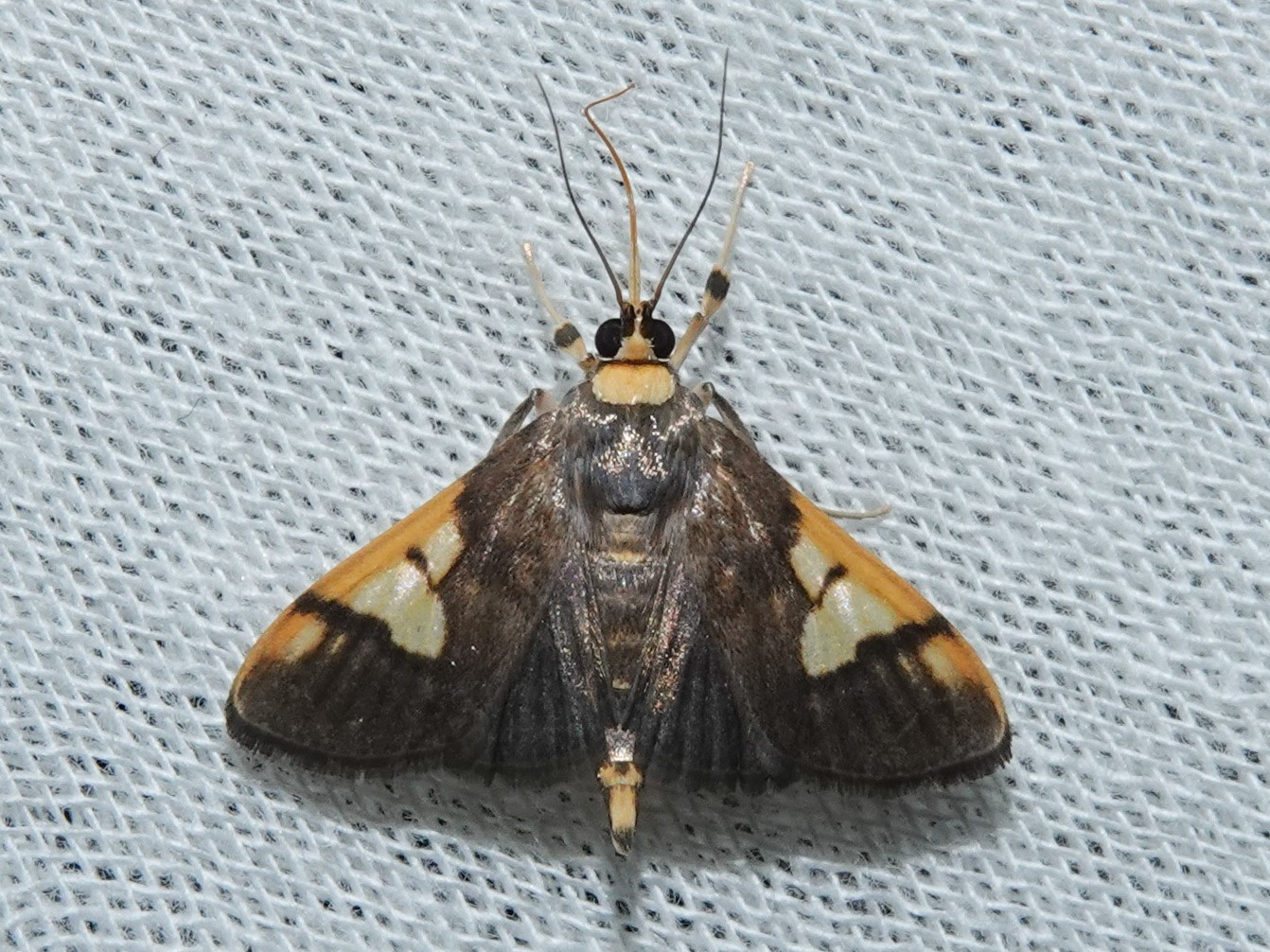

Scientific classification
- Kingdom: Animalia
- Phylum: Arthropoda
- Class: Insecta
- Order: Lepidoptera
- Family: Crambidae
- Genus: Ulopeza
- Species: U. idyalis

Binomial name
- Ulopeza idyalis (Walker, 1859)

Synonyms
- Botys idyalis Walker, 1859; Pseudanalthes idyalis

= Ulopeza idyalis =

Species of moth

Ulopeza idyalis is a species of moth in the family Crambidae. It was described by Francis Walker in 1859. It is found in Sri Lanka, India, and on Borneo and Sulawesi.

== Description ==
The forewings have three large costal yellowish-white iridescent semihyaline spots, the middle one much larger than the other two. The third is subdivided and forms a very incomplete band by means of two hindward dots. The costa and veins are mostly pale luteous (muddy yellow). The hindwings are broadly pale yellow along the costa.
