= Nosophora nubilis =

Scientific classification
- Kingdom: Animalia
- Phylum: Arthropoda
- Class: Insecta
- Order: Lepidoptera
- Family: Crambidae
- Genus: Nosophora
- Species: N. nubilis

Binomial name
- Nosophora nubilis C. Felder, R. Felder & Rogenhofer, 1875

Species of moth

Nosophora nubilis is a moth in the family Crambidae. It was described by Cajetan Felder, Rudolf Felder and Alois Friedrich Rogenhofer in 1875. It is found in Indonesia (Moluccas).
