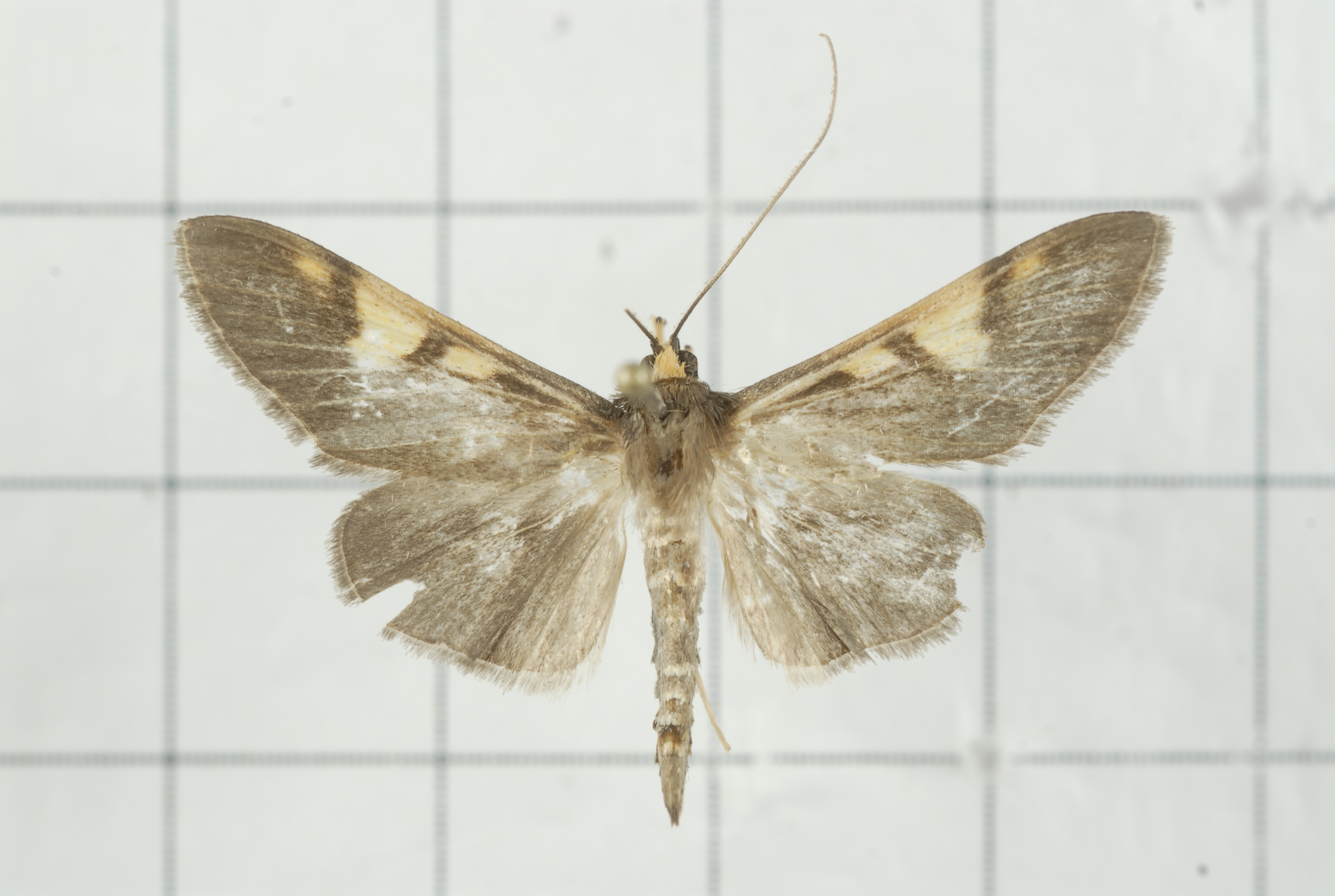

Scientific classification
- Kingdom: Animalia
- Phylum: Arthropoda
- Class: Insecta
- Order: Lepidoptera
- Family: Crambidae
- Genus: Nosophora
- Species: N. insignis

Binomial name
- Nosophora insignis (Butler, 1881)

Synonyms
- Botyodes insignis Butler, 1881

= Nosophora insignis =

Species of moth

Nosophora insignis is a moth in the family Crambidae. It was described by Arthur Gardiner Butler in 1881. It is found in Japan and China.
