= Ulopeza fuscomarginalis =

Scientific classification
- Kingdom: Animalia
- Phylum: Arthropoda
- Class: Insecta
- Order: Lepidoptera
- Family: Crambidae
- Genus: Ulopeza
- Species: U. fuscomarginalis

Binomial name
- Ulopeza fuscomarginalis (Ghesquière, 1940)

Synonyms
- Haplochytis fuscomarginalis Ghesquière, 1940

Species of moth

Ulopeza fuscomarginalis is a species of moth in the family Crambidae. It was described by Jean Ghesquière in 1940. It is found in the area of the former province Équateur in the Democratic Republic of the Congo.
