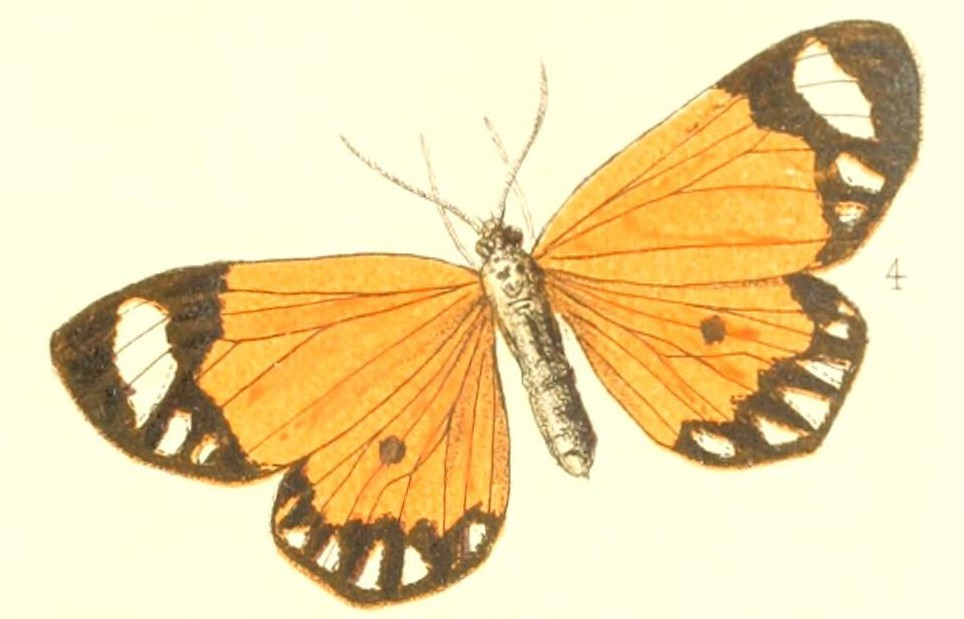
- Mimaletis postica

Scientific classification
- Kingdom: Animalia
- Phylum: Arthropoda
- Class: Insecta
- Order: Lepidoptera
- Family: Geometridae
- Subfamily: Ennominae
- Genus: Mimaletis; Warren, 1894

Type species
- *Aletis postica Walker, 1869

Synonyms
- Provola Swinhoe, 1904

= Mimaletis =

Genus of moths

Mimaletis is a genus of moths in the family Geometridae described by Warren in 1894. This genus is similar to Scopula but differs in neuration of the wings and the female's antennae that are shortly and stoutly pectinated (comb like).

== Species ==
Some species of this genus are:

- Mimaletis albipennis Warren, 1905
- Mimaletis humilis Warren, 1894
- Mimaletis landbecki (Druce, 1910)
- Mimaletis paucialbata Prout L. B., 1918
- Mimaletis postica (Walker, 1869)
- Mimaletis reducta Prout L. B., 1915
- Mimaletis verecunda Prout L. B., 1934
- Mimaletis watulekii Carcasson, 1962
