= Ulopeza junctilinealis =

Scientific classification
- Kingdom: Animalia
- Phylum: Arthropoda
- Class: Insecta
- Order: Lepidoptera
- Family: Crambidae
- Genus: Ulopeza
- Species: U. junctilinealis

Binomial name
- Ulopeza junctilinealis Hampson, 1912

Species of moth

Ulopeza junctilinealis is a species of moth in the family Crambidae. It was described by George Hampson in 1912. It is found in Indonesia (Bali).

== Description ==
The wingspan is about 26 mm. The forewings are yellow with a subbasal rufous line curving round at the costa and joining the antemedial line which is excurved to the submedian fold, then incurved. There is a point in the middle of the cell and a discoidal bar. The postmedial line is rufous, rather diffused and almost straight from the costa to vein 2, then retracted to the origin of vein 2, and angled inwards on vein 1 almost to the antemedial line, which it also almost meets at the inner margin. The terminal area is rufous with a yellow spot beyond the postmedial line at the costa. The hindwings are yellow with a diffused blackish spot below the lower angle of the cell. The inner area is broadly suffused with brown except at the base and the apical area is black-brown from the costa to vein 2, narrowing at the costa, and defined on the inner side between veins 6 and 2 by the diffused dark postmedial line which is excurved between veins 5 and 2.
