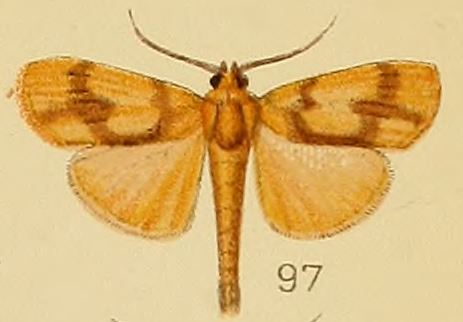

Scientific classification
- Kingdom: Animalia
- Phylum: Arthropoda
- Class: Insecta
- Order: Lepidoptera
- Family: Crambidae
- Genus: Ulopeza
- Species: U. cruciferalis

Binomial name
- Ulopeza cruciferalis Kenrick, 1907

= Ulopeza cruciferalis =

Species of moth

Ulopeza cruciferalis is a moth in the family Crambidae. It was described by George Hamilton Kenrick in 1907. It is found on New Guinea.

The wingspan is about 26 mm. The forewings are ochreous, clouded with purple and with three equidistant spots on the costa which are produced in widening angulated bands until they meet a longitudinal band on the inner margin. in the middle of the outer band is a projection reaching the hind margin. The hindwings are yellow.
