= Mimaletis watulekii =

Scientific classification
- Kingdom: Animalia
- Phylum: Arthropoda
- Clade: Pancrustacea
- Class: Insecta
- Order: Lepidoptera
- Family: Geometridae
- Genus: Mimaletis
- Species: M. watulekii

Binomial name
- Mimaletis watulekii Carcasson, 1962

Species of moth

Mimaletis watulekii is a moth in the family of Geometridae first described by Robert Herbert Carcasson in 1962.

This species is known from Nigeria and has a wingspan of 18–20 mm. The author dedicated this species to its discoverer, Mr. Bonifacio Watuleki.
