= Nosophora obliqualis =

Scientific classification
- Kingdom: Animalia
- Phylum: Arthropoda
- Class: Insecta
- Order: Lepidoptera
- Family: Crambidae
- Genus: Nosophora
- Species: N. obliqualis

Binomial name
- Nosophora obliqualis (Hampson, 1893)

Synonyms
- Analtes obliqualis Hampson, 1893

Species of moth

Nosophora obliqualis is a moth in the family Crambidae. It was described by George Hampson in 1893. It is found in Sri Lanka.
