= Nosophora flavibasalis =

Scientific classification
- Kingdom: Animalia
- Phylum: Arthropoda
- Class: Insecta
- Order: Lepidoptera
- Family: Crambidae
- Genus: Nosophora
- Species: N. flavibasalis

Binomial name
- Nosophora flavibasalis Hampson, 1899

Species of moth

Nosophora flavibasalis is a moth in the family Crambidae. It was described by George Hampson in 1899. It is found on New Guinea.
