= Epijana meridionalis =

Scientific classification
- Kingdom: Animalia
- Phylum: Arthropoda
- Class: Insecta
- Order: Lepidoptera
- Family: Eupterotidae
- Genus: Epijana
- Species: E. meridionalis

Binomial name
- Epijana meridionalis Dall'Asta & Poncin, 1980

Species of moth

Epijana meridionalis is a moth in the family Eupterotidae. It was described by Ugo Dall'Asta and G. Poncin in 1980. It is found in the former Katanga Province in the Democratic Republic of the Congo.
