= Ulopeza sterictodes =

Scientific classification
- Kingdom: Animalia
- Phylum: Arthropoda
- Class: Insecta
- Order: Lepidoptera
- Family: Crambidae
- Genus: Ulopeza
- Species: U. sterictodes

Binomial name
- Ulopeza sterictodes Hampson, 1912

Species of moth

Ulopeza sterictodes is a species of moth in the family Crambidae. It was described by George Hampson in 1912. It is found in Papua New Guinea.

== Description ==
The wingspan is about 36 mm. The forewings are dark brown with a slight olive tinge, the medial area is greyish except at the costa and there is some grey at the base of the inner margin. The antemedial line is black, slightly defined on the inner side by grey, excurved to the median nervure and incurved in the submedian interspace. There is a small black annulus in the middle of the cell and a larger discoidal annulus. The postmedial line is blackish defined on the outer side by grey, forming a rounded blackish patch below the costa, excurved and minutely dentate between veins 5 and 2, then bent inwards to below the end of the cell and forming a diffused spot in the submedian interspace. There is also a terminal series of small greyish spots. The hindwings are grey-white, the terminal area fuscous brown, broadly at the costa, narrowing to a point at the tornus. There is a fuscous point in the middle of the cell and rather diffused discoidal spot. The postmedial line is rather diffused and fuscous, defined on the outer side by grey, minutely dentate, excurved below the costa and bent inwards at vein 2 to below the end of the cell. There is a terminal series of small whitish spots.
