= Nosophora parvipunctalis =

Scientific classification
- Kingdom: Animalia
- Phylum: Arthropoda
- Class: Insecta
- Order: Lepidoptera
- Family: Crambidae
- Genus: Nosophora
- Species: N. parvipunctalis

Binomial name
- Nosophora parvipunctalis Hampson, 1896

Species of moth

Nosophora parvipunctalis is a moth in the family Crambidae. It was described by George Hampson in 1896. It is found in the Tenasserim Hills in the border region of Myanmar and Thailand.
