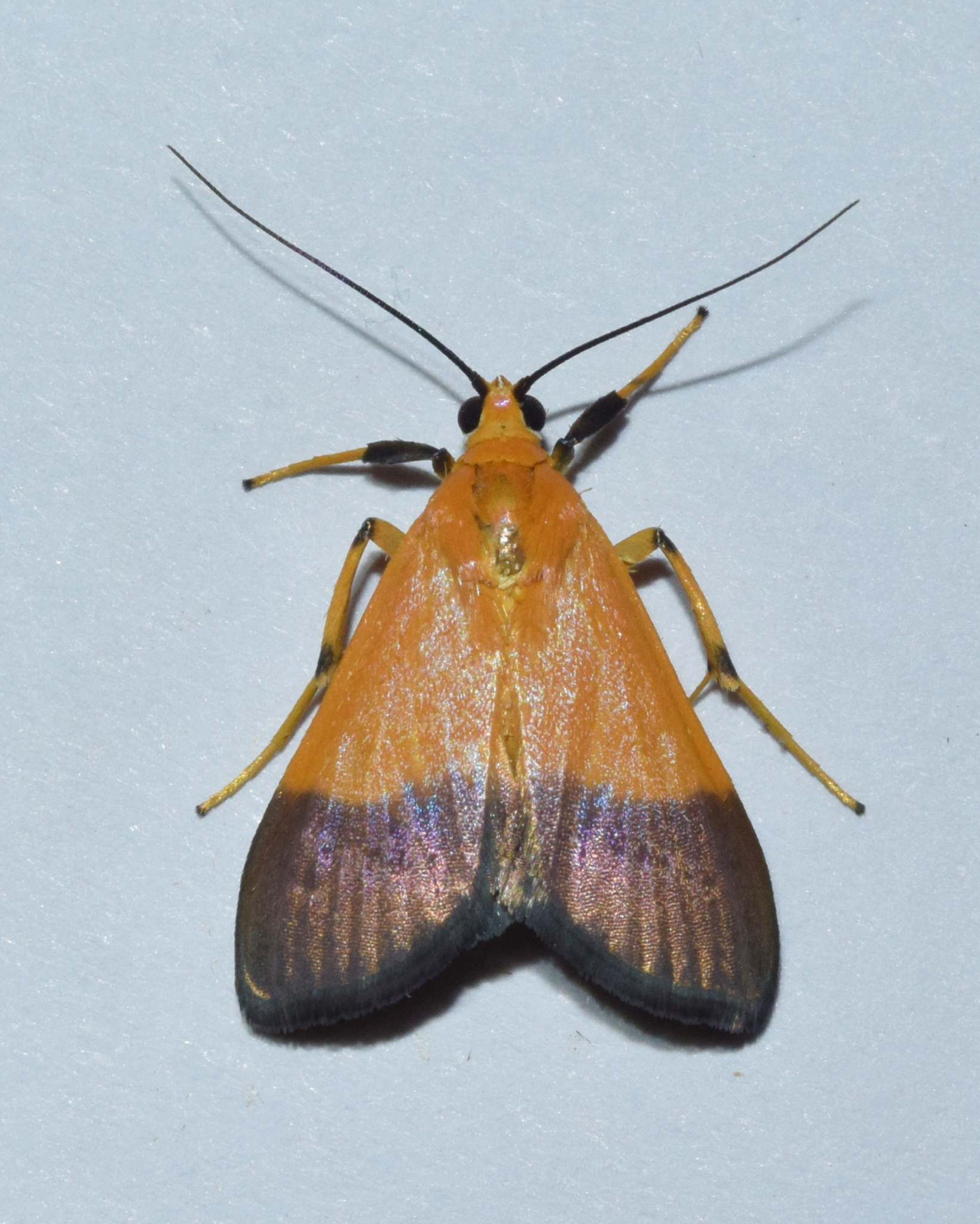

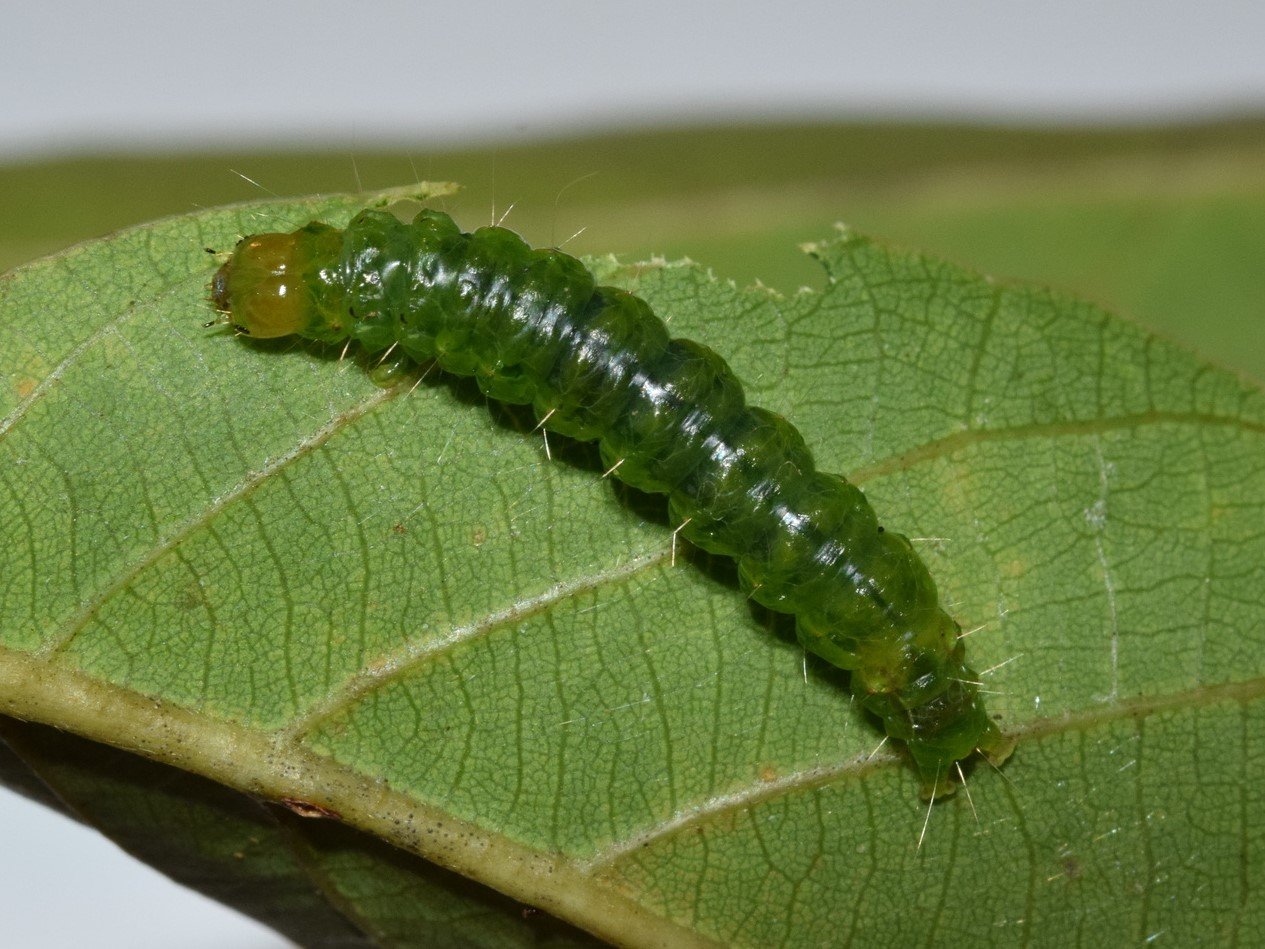
- Adult (top) and larva (bottom)

Scientific classification
- Kingdom: Animalia
- Phylum: Arthropoda
- Clade: Pancrustacea
- Class: Insecta
- Order: Lepidoptera
- Family: Crambidae
- Genus: Ulopeza
- Species: U. conigeralis

Binomial name
- Ulopeza conigeralis Zeller, 1852

Synonyms
- Botys latiferalis Walker, 1966; Ulopeza phaeothoracica Hampson, 1912; Xacca trigonalis Walker, 1869; Botys trigonalis Mabille, 1890

= Ulopeza conigeralis =

Species of moth

Ulopeza conigeralis is a species of moth in the family Crambidae. It was described by Philipp Christoph Zeller in 1852. It is found in Cameroon, the Republic of the Congo, the Democratic Republic of the Congo (West Kasai, Equateur, East Kasai), Equatorial Guinea, Ethiopia, Ghana, Ivory Coast, Mali, Nigeria, Sierra Leone, South Africa and Zambia.

The wingspan is about 20.5 mm. Adults are black to brown dorsally with dark brown forewings, with white patterns at the middle.

The larvae feed on the leaves of Moringa oleifera. Early instar larvae are dull white, while late instars are light red. Pupation takes place inside a silken cocoon.
