= Scopula valentinella =

Scientific classification
- Domain: Eukaryota
- Kingdom: Animalia
- Phylum: Arthropoda
- Class: Insecta
- Order: Lepidoptera
- Family: Geometridae
- Genus: Scopula
- Species: S. valentinella

Binomial name
- Scopula valentinella Karisch, 2001

Species of geometer moth in subfamily Sterrhinae

Scopula valentinella is a moth of the family Geometridae. It is found in Equatorial Guinea (Bioko).
