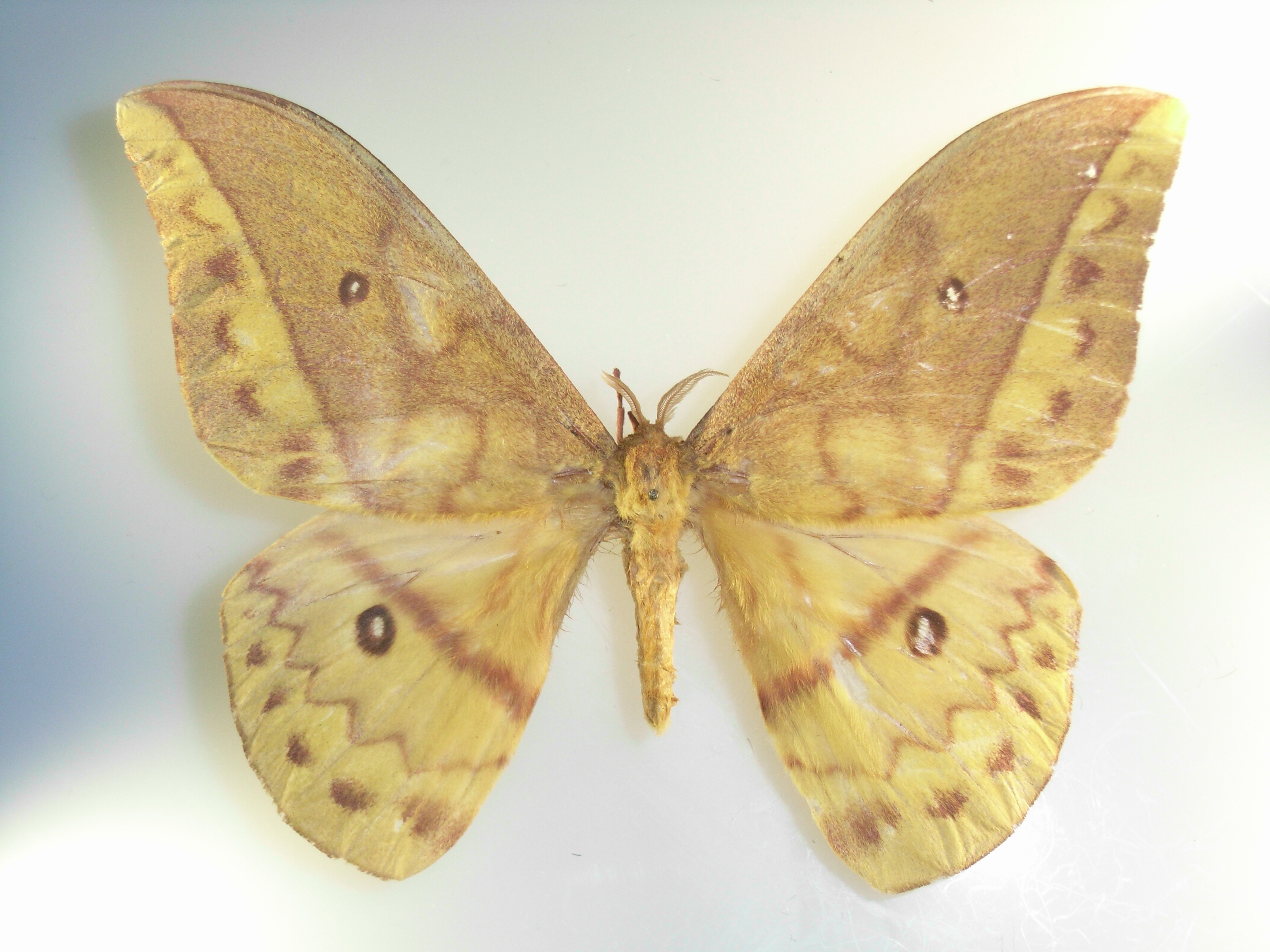
- Male
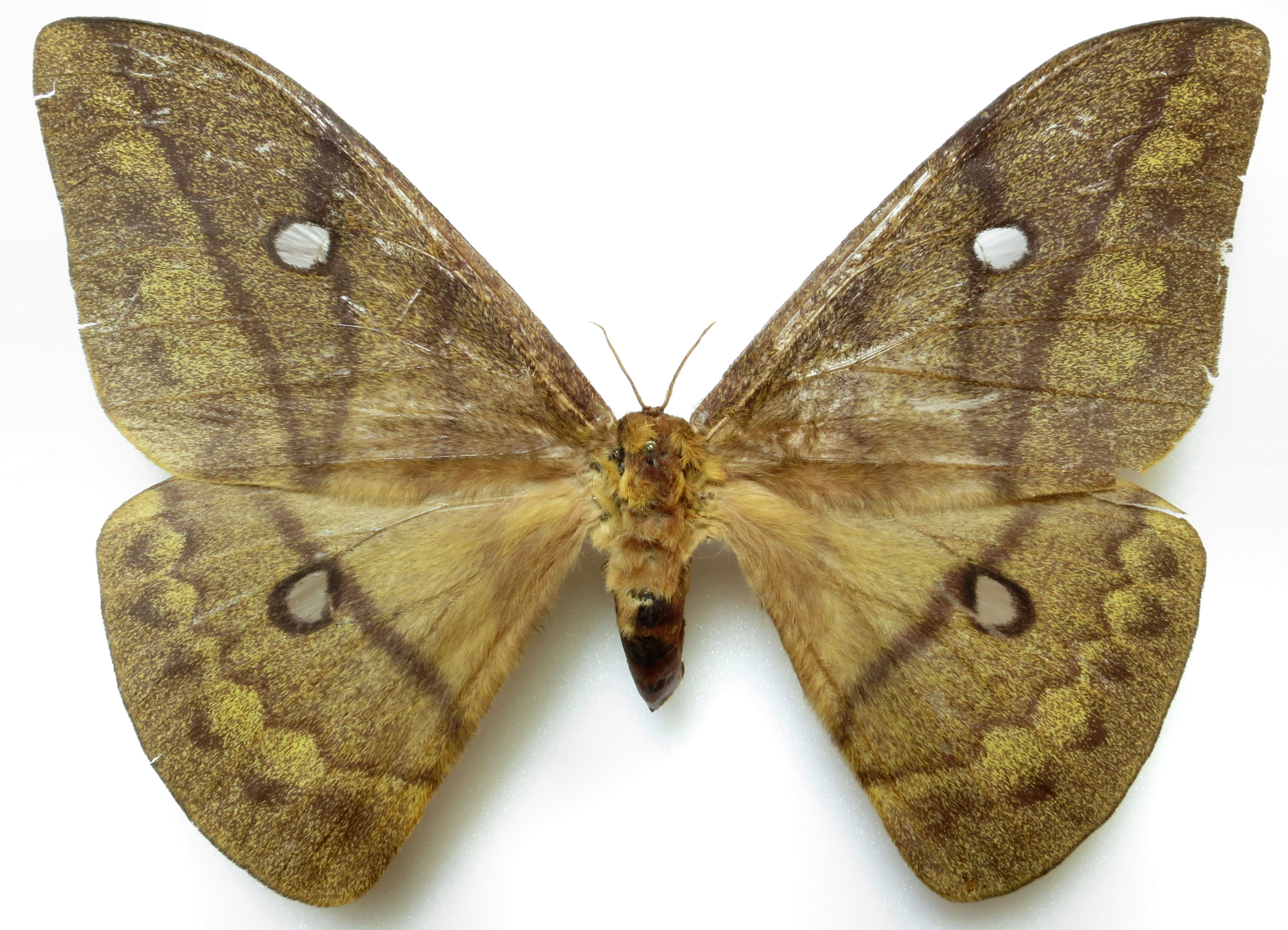
- Female

Scientific classification
- Domain: Eukaryota
- Kingdom: Animalia
- Phylum: Arthropoda
- Class: Insecta
- Order: Lepidoptera
- Family: Saturniidae
- Genus: Pseudantheraea
- Species: P. discrepans

Binomial name
- Pseudantheraea discrepans (Butler, 1878)

= Pseudantheraea discrepans =

Species of moth

Pseudantheraea discrepans is a species of moth of the family Saturniidae first described by Arthur Gardiner Butler in 1878. It is found in Africa, from Ivory Coast to Uganda in the north and from Angola to the Democratic Republic of the Congo in the south.

Larvae have been recorded on Entandrophragma angolense. They feed gregariously.
