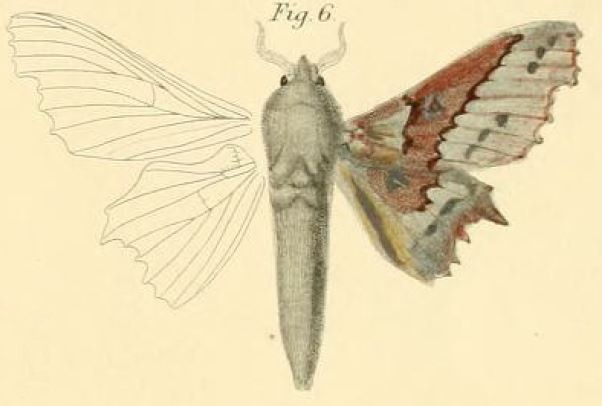

Scientific classification
- Domain: Eukaryota
- Kingdom: Animalia
- Phylum: Arthropoda
- Class: Insecta
- Order: Lepidoptera
- Family: Lasiocampidae
- Genus: Mimopacha
- Species: M. gerstaeckerii

Binomial name
- Mimopacha gerstaeckerii (Dewitz, 1881)

Synonyms
- Gastropacha gerstaeckerii Drewitz, 1881; Mimopacha alani Rougeot, 1991

= Mimopacha gerstaeckerii =

Species of moth

Mimopacha gerstaeckerii is a species of Lasiocampidae moth.

== Distribution ==
It is known from East, Central and West Africa.
