= Lophoceps alenicola =

Scientific classification
- Domain: Eukaryota
- Kingdom: Animalia
- Phylum: Arthropoda
- Class: Insecta
- Order: Lepidoptera
- Family: Sesiidae
- Genus: Lophoceps
- Species: L. alenicola

Binomial name
- Lophoceps alenicola (Strand, [1913])

Synonyms
- Aegeria alenicola Strand, [1913]; Conopia alenicola

Species of moth

Lophoceps alenicola is a moth of the family Sesiidae. It is known from Equatorial Guinea.
