= Epijana cosima =

Scientific classification
- Kingdom: Animalia
- Phylum: Arthropoda
- Class: Insecta
- Order: Lepidoptera
- Family: Eupterotidae
- Genus: Epijana
- Species: E. cosima

Binomial name
- Epijana cosima (Plötz, 1880)

Synonyms
- Jana cosima Plötz, 1880; Epijana lanosa Holland, 1893; Stenoglene velutonia Druce, 1896

Species of moth

Epijana cosima is a moth in the family Eupterotidae. It was described by Plötz in 1880. It is found in Cameroon, the Central African Republic, the Democratic Republic of Congo (Orientale, Equateur), Equatorial Guinea, Gabon and Nigeria.

It has a wingspan of about 75 mm for males and 80 mm for females. The forewings are crossed by a straight blackish, or very dark brown line which runs from the costa before the apex to the inner margin about its middle, and is defined outwardly by a narrow line of pale lilac. The wings within this line toward the base are dark brown, beyond it they are paler brown, dusted near the apex and above the outer angle with lilac scales. The hindwings are bright yellowish-ochraceous laved with brown shading into lilac upon the inner margin and at the anal angle.
