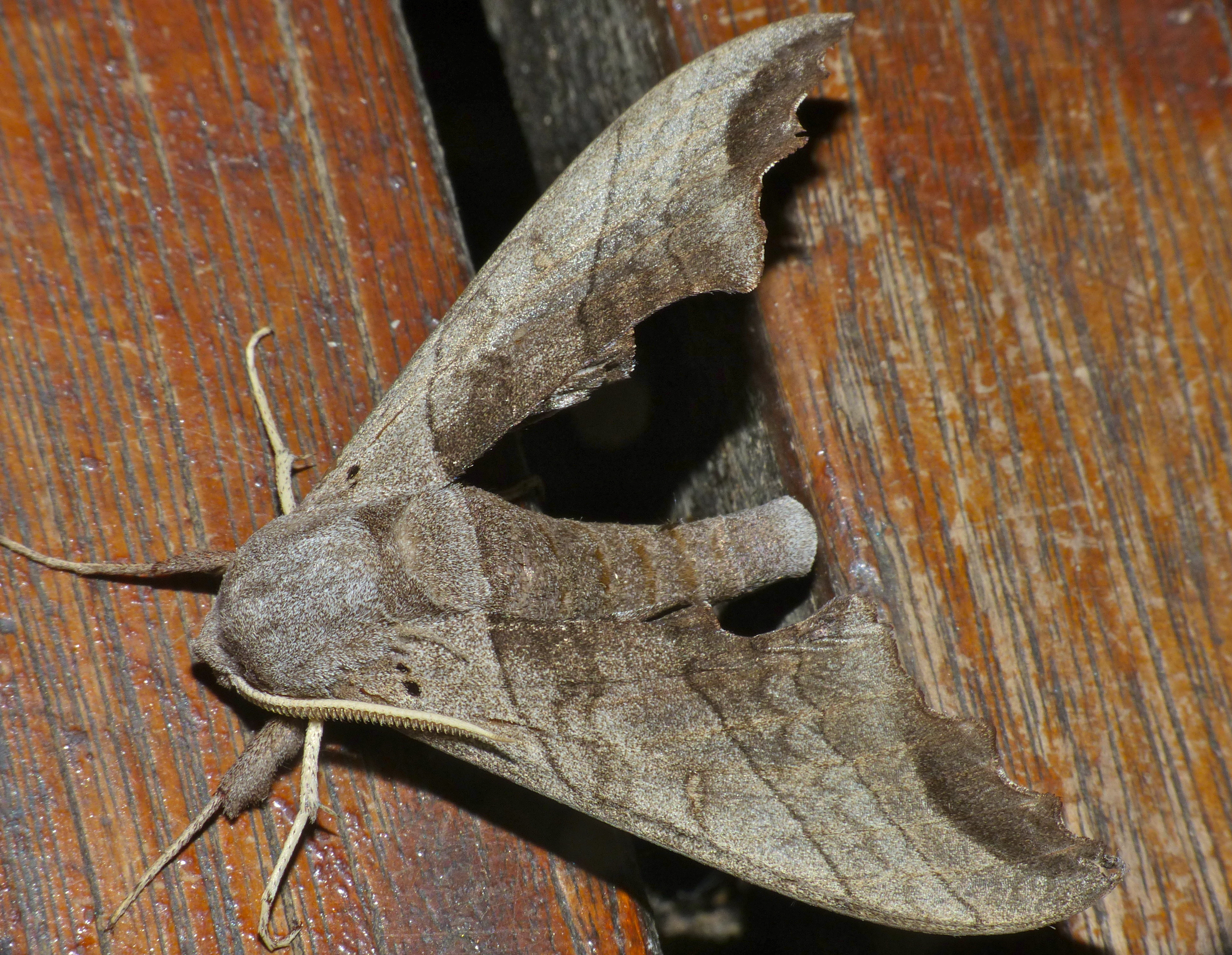

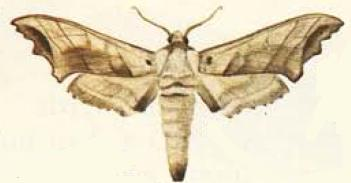

Scientific classification
- Domain: Eukaryota
- Kingdom: Animalia
- Phylum: Arthropoda
- Class: Insecta
- Order: Lepidoptera
- Family: Sphingidae
- Genus: Polyptychoides
- Species: P. grayii

Binomial name
- Polyptychoides grayii (Walker, 1856)

Synonyms
- Smerinthus grayii Walker, 1856; Polyptychus grayii modestus (Gehlen, 1942)

= Polyptychoides grayii =

Gray's polyptychus

Species of moth

Polyptychoides grayii, or Gray's polyptychus, is a moth of the family Sphingidae. It is known from eastern Africa, south to South Africa.

The wingspan is 77–93 mm.

The larvae feed on Cordia caffra.
