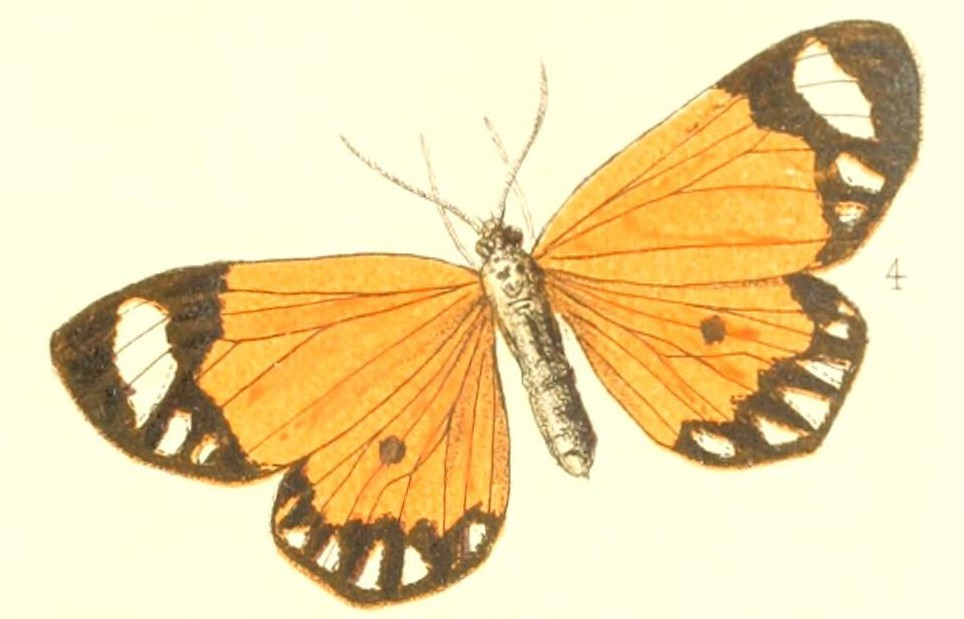

Scientific classification
- Kingdom: Animalia
- Phylum: Arthropoda
- Clade: Pancrustacea
- Class: Insecta
- Order: Lepidoptera
- Family: Geometridae
- Genus: Mimaletis
- Species: M. postica

Binomial name
- Mimaletis postica (Walker, 1869)

Synonyms
- Aletis postica Walker, 1869

= Mimaletis postica =

Species of moth

Mimaletis postica is a moth in the family of Geometridae first described by Francis Walker in 1869.

This species is known from Equatorial Guinea and the Democratic Republic of the Congo.
