= Ovenna guineacola =

Scientific classification
- Domain: Eukaryota
- Kingdom: Animalia
- Phylum: Arthropoda
- Class: Insecta
- Order: Lepidoptera
- Superfamily: Noctuoidea
- Family: Erebidae
- Subfamily: Arctiinae
- Genus: Ovenna
- Species: O. guineacola

Binomial name
- Ovenna guineacola (Strand, 1912)

Synonyms
- Eilema guineacola Strand, 1912

Species of moth

Ovenna guineacola is a moth of the subfamily Arctiinae. It was described by Strand in 1912. It is found in Equatorial Guinea, Ghana, Guinea, Kenya, Nigeria and Uganda.
