= Eupithecia karischi =

Scientific classification
- Domain: Eukaryota
- Kingdom: Animalia
- Phylum: Arthropoda
- Class: Insecta
- Order: Lepidoptera
- Family: Geometridae
- Genus: Eupithecia
- Species: E. karischi

Binomial name
- Eupithecia karischi Herbulot, 1999

Species of moth

Eupithecia karischi is a moth in the family Geometridae. It is found in Equatorial Guinea (Bioko).
