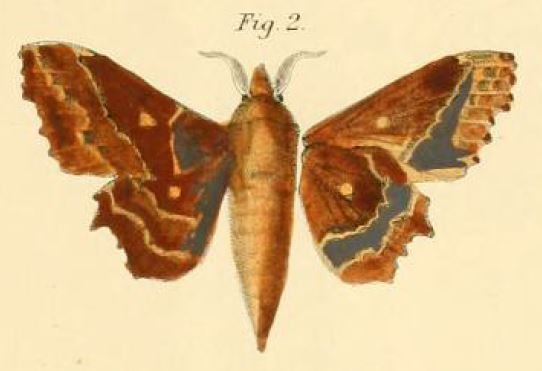

Scientific classification
- Domain: Eukaryota
- Kingdom: Animalia
- Phylum: Arthropoda
- Class: Insecta
- Order: Lepidoptera
- Family: Lasiocampidae
- Genus: Mimopacha
- Species: M. knoblauchii

Binomial name
- Mimopacha knoblauchii (Dewitz, 1881)

Synonyms
- Gastropacha knoblauchii Drewitz, 1881

= Mimopacha knoblauchii =

Species of moth

Mimopacha knoblauchii is a species of Lasiocampidae moth.

== Distribution ==
This species is known from Angola, Congo, Cameroon, Equatorial Guinea and South Africa.
