= Ovenna agonchae =

Scientific classification
- Domain: Eukaryota
- Kingdom: Animalia
- Phylum: Arthropoda
- Class: Insecta
- Order: Lepidoptera
- Superfamily: Noctuoidea
- Family: Erebidae
- Subfamily: Arctiinae
- Genus: Ovenna
- Species: O. agonchae

Binomial name
- Ovenna agonchae (Plötz, 1880)

Synonyms
- Lithosia agonchae Plötz, 1880; Ilema callidescens Hampson, 1914; Eilema heringi Kiriakoff, 1954; Eilema subgriseola Strand, 1912

Species of moth

Ovenna agonchae is a moth of the subfamily Arctiinae. It was described by Plötz in 1880. It is found in Cameroon, the Democratic Republic of Congo, Equatorial Guinea, Ghana, Nigeria, South Africa and Uganda.
