= Epijana cinerea =

Scientific classification
- Kingdom: Animalia
- Phylum: Arthropoda
- Class: Insecta
- Order: Lepidoptera
- Family: Eupterotidae
- Genus: Epijana
- Species: E. cinerea

Binomial name
- Epijana cinerea Holland, 1893

Synonyms
- Epijana maculifera Strand, 1912; Stenoglene cinerea Holland, 1893

Species of moth

Epijana cinerea is a moth in the family Eupterotidae. It was described by William Jacob Holland in 1893. It is found in the Democratic Republic of the Congo (Orientale, Équateur), Equatorial Guinea and Gabon.

The wingspan about 75 mm. The forewings are greyish fawn, crossed beyond the cell by a straight, dark brown transverse line, which runs from the middle of the inner margin to beyond the middle of the costa just before reaching it, at which point it is bent inwardly toward the base. This line is followed by an obscure parallel line of the same colour which extends from the inner margin to a point opposite the end of the cell. This is in turn succeeded by an irregularly curved series of brown sagittate (arrowhead-shaped) markings followed on the outer margin below the apex and near the outer angle by broad, dark brown clouding. The hindwings are similar to the forewings, but crossed by regularly curved transverse median, transverse limbal and transverse submarginal lines, which are somewhat obscure near the costa.
