= Pyrausta sexplagialis =

Scientific classification
- Domain: Eukaryota
- Kingdom: Animalia
- Phylum: Arthropoda
- Class: Insecta
- Order: Lepidoptera
- Family: Crambidae
- Genus: Pyrausta
- Species: P. sexplagialis

Binomial name
- Pyrausta sexplagialis Gaede, 1917

Species of moth

Pyrausta sexplagialis is a moth in the family Crambidae. It was described by Max Gaede in 1917. It is found in Equatorial Guinea.
