= Eupithecia jeanneli =

Scientific classification
- Domain: Eukaryota
- Kingdom: Animalia
- Phylum: Arthropoda
- Class: Insecta
- Order: Lepidoptera
- Family: Geometridae
- Genus: Eupithecia
- Species: E. jeanneli

Binomial name
- Eupithecia jeanneli Herbulot, 1953

Species of moth

Eupithecia jeanneli is a moth in the family Geometridae. It is found in Equatorial Guinea, Kenya and Uganda.
