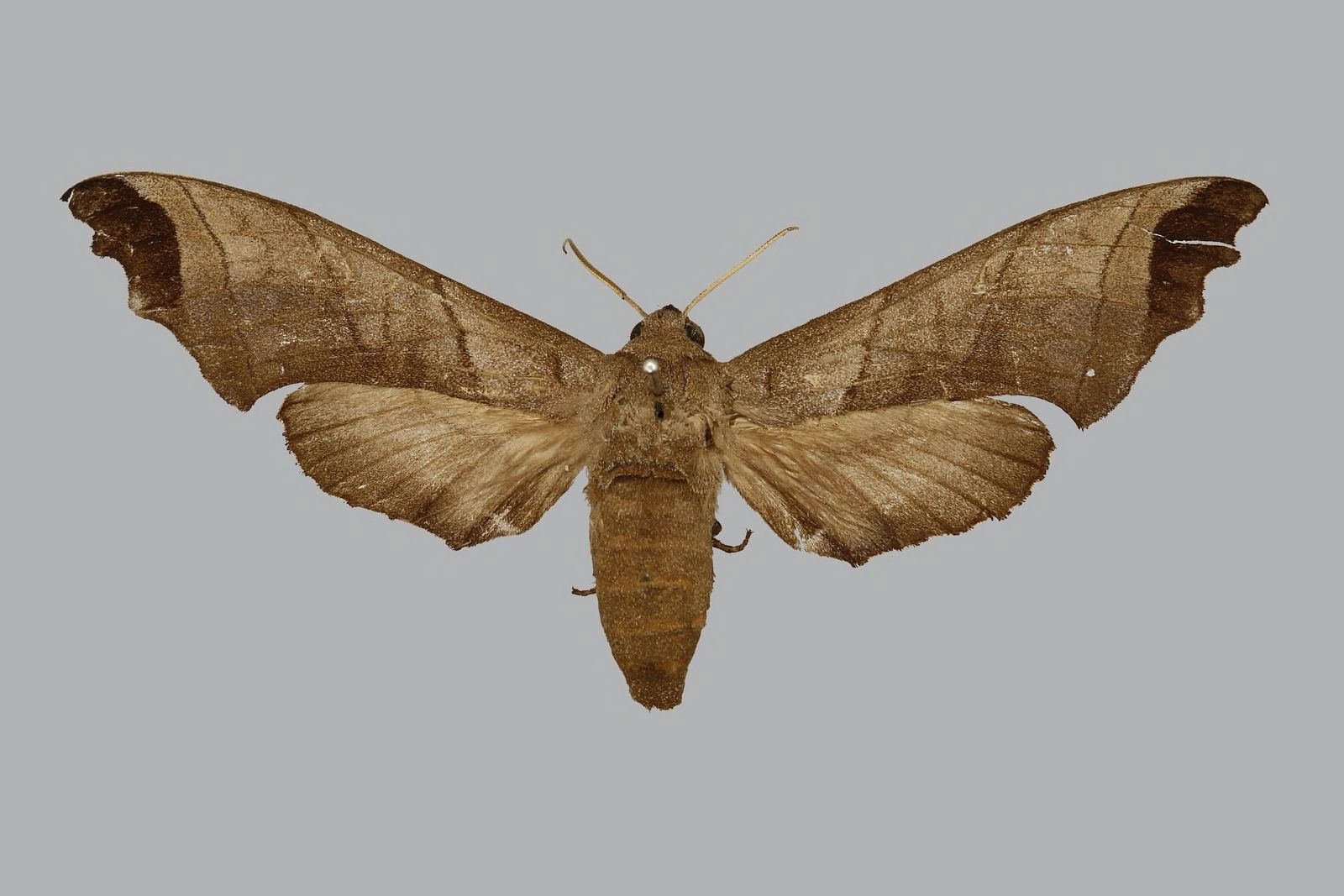

Scientific classification
- Domain: Eukaryota
- Kingdom: Animalia
- Phylum: Arthropoda
- Class: Insecta
- Order: Lepidoptera
- Family: Sphingidae
- Genus: Polyptychoides
- Species: P. digitatus

Binomial name
- Polyptychoides digitatus (Karsch, 1891)

Synonyms
- Polyptychus digitatus Karsch, 1891; Smerinthus dentatus Dewitz, 1879 (suppressed)

= Polyptychoides digitatus =

Species of moth

Polyptychoides digitatus is a moth of the family Sphingidae. It is known from heavy forest up to 8,000 feet from Liberia and Angola to Uganda and western Kenya.

The length of the forewings is 39–41 mm for males.
