= Eois alticola =

Scientific classification
- Kingdom: Animalia
- Phylum: Arthropoda
- Clade: Pancrustacea
- Class: Insecta
- Order: Lepidoptera
- Family: Geometridae
- Genus: Eois
- Species: E. alticola

Binomial name
- Eois alticola (Aurivillius, 1925)

Synonyms
- Psilocambogia alticola Aurivillius, 1925

Species of moth

Eois alticola is a moth in the family Geometridae. It is found in Equatorial Guinea and Kenya.
