= Ulopeza alenialis =

Scientific classification
- Kingdom: Animalia
- Phylum: Arthropoda
- Class: Insecta
- Order: Lepidoptera
- Family: Crambidae
- Genus: Ulopeza
- Species: U. alenialis

Binomial name
- Ulopeza alenialis Strand, 1913

Synonyms
- Ulopeza alenialis ab. fulvimaculalis Strand, 1920

Species of moth

Ulopeza alenialis is a species of moth in the family Crambidae. It was described by Strand in 1913. It is found in Cameroon, the Democratic Republic of Congo and Equatorial Guinea.
