= Scopula acidalia =

Scientific classification
- Domain: Eukaryota
- Kingdom: Animalia
- Phylum: Arthropoda
- Class: Insecta
- Order: Lepidoptera
- Family: Geometridae
- Genus: Scopula
- Species: S. acidalia

Binomial name
- Scopula acidalia Holland, 1894

Synonyms
- Capnodes acidalia Holland, 1894

Species of geometer moths in subfamily Sterrhinae

Scopula acidalia is a moth of the family Geometridae. It was described by William Jacob Holland in 1894. It is found in the Democratic Republic of the Congo, Equatorial Guinea and Ivory Coast.
