= Scopula suda =

Scientific classification
- Domain: Eukaryota
- Kingdom: Animalia
- Phylum: Arthropoda
- Class: Insecta
- Order: Lepidoptera
- Family: Geometridae
- Genus: Scopula
- Species: S. suda

Binomial name
- Scopula suda Prout, 1932

Species of geometer moth in subfamily Sterrhinae

Scopula suda is a moth of the family Geometridae. It is found in the Democratic Republic of Congo, Equatorial Guinea (Bioko), Rwanda and Uganda.
