= Scopula karischi =

Scientific classification
- Domain: Eukaryota
- Kingdom: Animalia
- Phylum: Arthropoda
- Class: Insecta
- Order: Lepidoptera
- Family: Geometridae
- Genus: Scopula
- Species: S. karischi

Binomial name
- Scopula karischi Herbulot, 1999

Species of geometer moth in subfamily Sterrhinae

Scopula karischi is a moth of the family Geometridae. It was described by Claude Herbulot in 1999. It is found on Bioko, an island of the west coast of Africa that is part of Equatorial Guinea.
