= Scopula herbuloti =

Scientific classification
- Domain: Eukaryota
- Kingdom: Animalia
- Phylum: Arthropoda
- Class: Insecta
- Order: Lepidoptera
- Family: Geometridae
- Genus: Scopula
- Species: S. herbuloti

Binomial name
- Scopula herbuloti (Viette, 1977)

Synonyms
- Antitrygodes herbuloti Viette, 1977

Species of geometer moth in subfamily Sterrhinae

Scopula herbuloti is a moth in the family Geometridae. Endemic to Madagascar, it was described by Pierre Viette in 1977.
