= Scopula pyraliata =

Scientific classification
- Domain: Eukaryota
- Kingdom: Animalia
- Phylum: Arthropoda
- Class: Insecta
- Order: Lepidoptera
- Family: Geometridae
- Genus: Scopula
- Species: S. pyraliata

Binomial name
- Scopula pyraliata (Warren, 1898)

Synonyms
- Craspedia pyraliata Warren, 1898

Species of geometer moth in subfamily Sterrhinae

Scopula pyraliata is a moth of the family Geometridae. It is found in the Democratic Republic of Congo, Equatorial Guinea (Bioko), Gabon, Ivory Coast, Liberia, Nigeria and Uganda.
