= Eupithecia calderae =

Scientific classification
- Domain: Eukaryota
- Kingdom: Animalia
- Phylum: Arthropoda
- Class: Insecta
- Order: Lepidoptera
- Family: Geometridae
- Genus: Eupithecia
- Species: E. calderae

Binomial name
- Eupithecia calderae Herbulot, 1999

Species of moth

Eupithecia calderae is a moth in the family Geometridae. It is found in Equatorial Guinea.
