= Nosophora panaresalis =

Scientific classification
- Kingdom: Animalia
- Phylum: Arthropoda
- Class: Insecta
- Order: Lepidoptera
- Family: Crambidae
- Genus: Nosophora
- Species: N. panaresalis

Binomial name
- Nosophora panaresalis (Walker, 1859)

Synonyms
- Botys panaresalis Walker, 1859

Species of moth

Nosophora panaresalis is a moth in the family Crambidae. It was described by Francis Walker in 1859. It is found in Cameroon, the Democratic Republic of the Congo and Equatorial Guinea.
