= Apisa =

Scientific classification
- Kingdom: Animalia
- Phylum: Arthropoda
- Clade: Pancrustacea
- Class: Insecta
- Order: Lepidoptera
- Superfamily: Noctuoidea
- Family: Erebidae
- Subfamily: Arctiinae
- Tribe: Syntomini
- Genus: Apisa; Walker, 1855

Synonyms
- Parapisa Kiriakoff, 1952

Genus of moths

Apisa is a genus of moths in the family Erebidae.

== Species ==
- Apisa alberici Dufrane, 1945
- Apisa arabica Warnecke, 1934
- Apisa canescens Walker, 1855
- Apisa cinereocostata Holland, 1893
- Apisa fontainei Kiriakoff, 1959
- Apisa grisescens Dufrane, 1945
- Apisa hildae Kiriakoff, 1961
- Apisa manettii Turati, 1924
- Apisa rendalli Rothschild, 1910
- Apisa subargentea Joicey & Talbot, 1921
- Apisa subcanescens Rothschild, 1910

== Former species ==
- Apisa cleta Plötz, 1880
- Apisa connexa Walker, 1854
- Apisa crenophylax Holland, 1893
- Apisa histrio Kiriakoff, 1953
- Apisa kamitugensis Dufrane, 1945
- Apisa kivensis Dufrane, 1945
- Apisa metarctiodes Hampson, 1907
- Apisa sjoestedti Aurivillius, 1904
- Apisa tristigma Mabille, 1893
