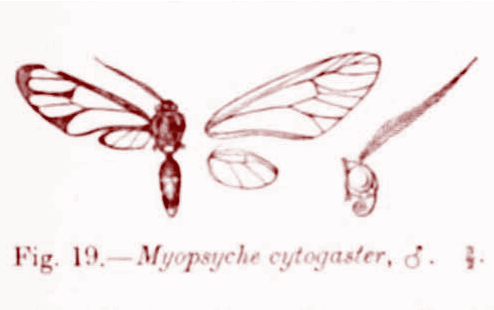

Scientific classification
- Kingdom: Animalia
- Phylum: Arthropoda
- Class: Insecta
- Order: Lepidoptera
- Superfamily: Noctuoidea
- Family: Erebidae
- Subfamily: Arctiinae
- Genus: Myopsyche; Hampson, 1898

Type species
- Myopsyche ochsenheimeri (Boisduval, 1829)

= Myopsyche =

Genus of moths

Myopsyche is a genus of moths in the subfamily Arctiinae. The genus was erected by George Hampson in 1898.

== Species ==
Species in this genus include:

- Myopsyche bokumae Kiriakoff, 1954
- Myopsyche cytogaster (Holland, 1893)
- Myopsyche elachista (Holland, 1893)
- Myopsyche fulvibasalis (Hampson, 1918)
- Myopsyche idda (Plötz, 1880)
- Myopsyche langi Holland, 1920
- Myopsyche makomensis Strand, 1912
- Myopsyche miserabilis (Holland, 1893)
- Myopsyche nervalis Strand, 1912
- Myopsyche notoplagia Hampson, 1898
- Myopsyche ochsenheimeri (Boisduval, 1829)
- Myopsyche pallidicincta Kiriakoff, 1954
- Myopsyche puncticincta (Holland, 1893)
- Myopsyche sankuruica Kiriakoff, 1954
- Myopsyche victorina (Plötz, 1880)
- Myopsyche xanthopleura (Holland, 1898)
- Myopsyche xanthosoma Hampson, 1907

== Former species ==
- Myopsyche alluaudi (Oberthür, 1911)
- Myopsyche blandina (Oberthür, 1893)
- Myopsyche kivensis Dufrane, 1945
- Myopsyche nigrita (Kiriakoff, 1961)
