= Meganaclia =

Scientific classification
- Domain: Eukaryota
- Kingdom: Animalia
- Phylum: Arthropoda
- Class: Insecta
- Order: Lepidoptera
- Superfamily: Noctuoidea
- Family: Erebidae
- Subfamily: Arctiinae
- Tribe: Syntomini
- Genus: Meganaclia; Aurivillius, 1892

Genus of moths

Meganaclia is a genus of moths in the family Erebidae.

== Species ==
- Meganaclia sippia Plötz, 1880

== Former species ==
- Meganaclia carnea Hampson, 1898
- Meganaclia microsippia Strand, 1912
- Meganaclia perpusilla Walker, 1856
