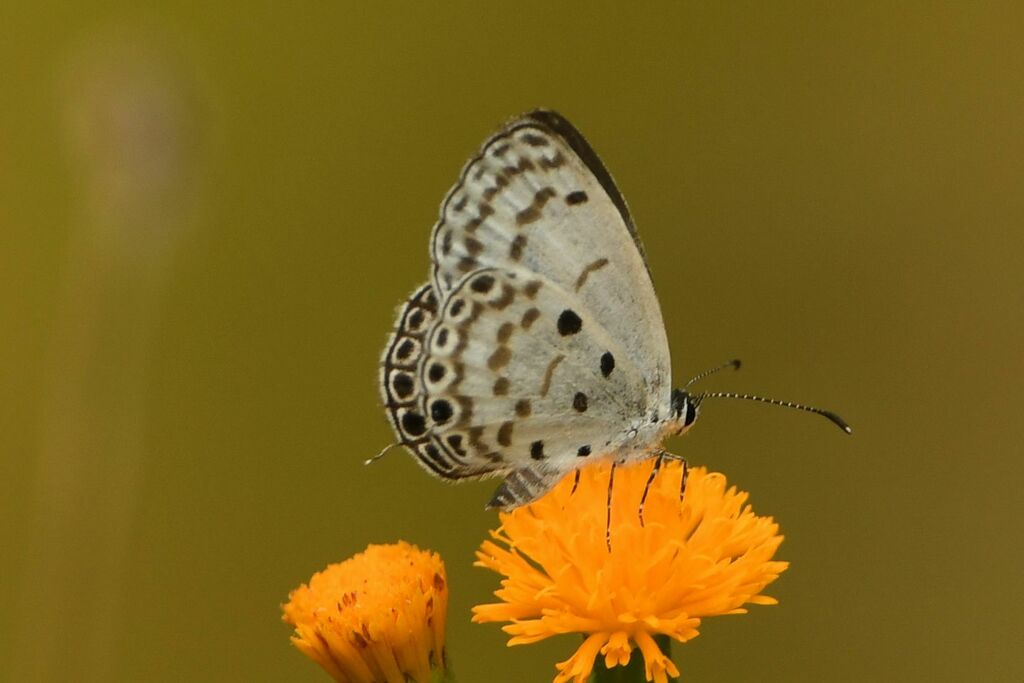

Scientific classification
- Kingdom: Animalia
- Phylum: Arthropoda
- Class: Insecta
- Order: Lepidoptera
- Family: Lycaenidae
- Genus: Thermoniphas
- Species: T. alberici

Binomial name
- Thermoniphas alberici (Dufrane, 1945)

Synonyms
- Everes alberici Dufrane, 1945

= Thermoniphas alberici =

Species of butterfly

Thermoniphas alberici, the Alberic's chalk blue, is a butterfly in the family Lycaenidae. It is found in Nigeria, Cameroon, Gabon, the Republic of the Congo, the Democratic Republic of the Congo (Mayumbe, Mongala, Uele, Ituri, Kivu and Tshopo) and Uganda.
