= Pseudodiptera alberici =

Scientific classification
- Domain: Eukaryota
- Kingdom: Animalia
- Phylum: Arthropoda
- Class: Insecta
- Order: Lepidoptera
- Superfamily: Noctuoidea
- Family: Erebidae
- Subfamily: Arctiinae
- Genus: Pseudodiptera
- Species: P. alberici

Binomial name
- Pseudodiptera alberici Dufrane, 1945

Synonyms
- Ceryx alberici Dufrane, 1945

Species of moth

Pseudodiptera alberici is a moth of the family Erebidae. It was described by Abel Dufrane in 1945. It is found in the Democratic Republic of the Congo and Kenya.
