= P. carnea =

P. carnea may refer to:

- Palaeaspilates carnea, a geometer moth
- Peachia carnea, a sea anemone
- Peniophora carnea, a wood-decay fungus
- Phlox carnea, a flowering plant
- Phytometra carnea, an owlet moth
- Pinna carnea, a bivalve mollusc
- Pitcairnia carnea, a flowering plant
- Prodioxys carnea, an Israeli bee
- Pseudosimnia carnea, a sea snail
- Pseudothyretes carnea, a wooly bear
- Pyura carnea, a sessile ascidian
