= Meganaclia sippia =

Scientific classification
- Domain: Eukaryota
- Kingdom: Animalia
- Phylum: Arthropoda
- Class: Insecta
- Order: Lepidoptera
- Superfamily: Noctuoidea
- Family: Erebidae
- Subfamily: Arctiinae
- Genus: Meganaclia
- Species: M. sippia

Binomial name
- Meganaclia sippia Plötz, 1880

Synonyms
- Naclia sippia Plötz, 1880

Species of moth

Meganaclia sippia is a moth of the family Erebidae. It was described by Plötz in 1880. It is found in Cameroon, the Republic of Congo, the Democratic Republic of Congo, Equatorial Guinea, Ghana, Ivory Coast, Kenya, Niger, Nigeria, Sierra Leone, Tanzania and Uganda.

The larvae are reported to be polyphagous.
