= Apisa grisescens =

Scientific classification
- Kingdom: Animalia
- Phylum: Arthropoda
- Clade: Pancrustacea
- Class: Insecta
- Order: Lepidoptera
- Superfamily: Noctuoidea
- Family: Erebidae
- Subfamily: Arctiinae
- Genus: Apisa
- Species: A. grisescens

Binomial name
- Apisa grisescens (Dufrane, 1945)

Synonyms
- Metarctia grisescens Dufrane, 1945

Species of moth

Apisa grisescens is a moth of the family Erebidae. It was described by Abel Dufrane in 1945. It is found in the Democratic Republic of the Congo, Malawi, Mozambique and Zimbabwe.
