= Ceryx carpentieri =

Scientific classification
- Kingdom: Animalia
- Phylum: Arthropoda
- Class: Insecta
- Order: Lepidoptera
- Superfamily: Noctuoidea
- Family: Erebidae
- Subfamily: Arctiinae
- Genus: Ceryx
- Species: C. carpentieri

Binomial name
- Ceryx carpentieri Dufrane, 1936

Species of moth

Ceryx carpentieri is a moth of the subfamily Arctiinae. It was described by Abel Dufrane in 1936. It is found in the Democratic Republic of the Congo.
