= Thermoniphas kamitugensis =

Scientific classification
- Kingdom: Animalia
- Phylum: Arthropoda
- Class: Insecta
- Order: Lepidoptera
- Family: Lycaenidae
- Genus: Thermoniphas
- Species: T. kamitugensis

Binomial name
- Thermoniphas kamitugensis (Dufrane, 1945)

Synonyms
- Everes kamitugensis Dufrane, 1945

Species of butterfly

Thermoniphas kamitugensis is a butterfly in the family Lycaenidae. It is found in Kivu in the Democratic Republic of the Congo.
