= Ceryx joltrandi =

Scientific classification
- Domain: Eukaryota
- Kingdom: Animalia
- Phylum: Arthropoda
- Class: Insecta
- Order: Lepidoptera
- Superfamily: Noctuoidea
- Family: Erebidae
- Subfamily: Arctiinae
- Genus: Ceryx
- Species: C. joltrandi

Binomial name
- Ceryx joltrandi Dufrane, 1936

Species of moth

Ceryx joltrandi is a moth of the subfamily Arctiinae. It was described by Abel Dufrane in 1936. It is found in the Democratic Republic of the Congo.
