= Pseudothyretes mariae =

Scientific classification
- Kingdom: Animalia
- Phylum: Arthropoda
- Class: Insecta
- Order: Lepidoptera
- Superfamily: Noctuoidea
- Family: Erebidae
- Subfamily: Arctiinae
- Genus: Pseudothyretes
- Species: P. mariae

Binomial name
- Pseudothyretes mariae Dufrane, 1945

Species of moth

Pseudothyretes mariae is a moth in the subfamily Arctiinae. It was described by Abel Dufrane in 1945. It is found in the Democratic Republic of the Congo.
