= Myopsyche idda =

Scientific classification
- Kingdom: Animalia
- Phylum: Arthropoda
- Class: Insecta
- Order: Lepidoptera
- Superfamily: Noctuoidea
- Family: Erebidae
- Subfamily: Arctiinae
- Genus: Myopsyche
- Species: M. idda

Binomial name
- Myopsyche idda (Plötz, 1880)

Synonyms
- Syntomis idda Plötz, 1880

Species of moth

Myopsyche idda is a moth of the subfamily of Arctiinae. It was first described by Plötz in 1880. It is found in Cameroon.
