= Myopsyche victorina =

Scientific classification
- Kingdom: Animalia
- Phylum: Arthropoda
- Class: Insecta
- Order: Lepidoptera
- Superfamily: Noctuoidea
- Family: Erebidae
- Subfamily: Arctiinae
- Genus: Myopsyche
- Species: M. victorina

Binomial name
- Myopsyche victorina (Plötz, 1880)

Synonyms
- Syntomis victorina Plötz, 1880

Species of moth

Myopsyche victorina is a moth of the subfamily Arctiinae. It was described by Plötz in 1880. It is found in Cameroon.
