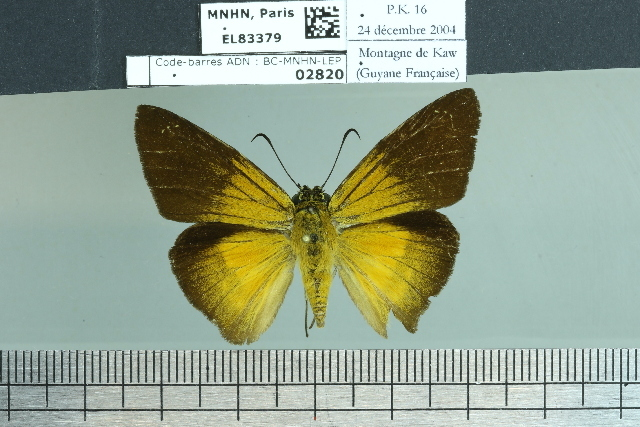
- Adult

Scientific classification
- Kingdom: Animalia
- Phylum: Arthropoda
- Class: Insecta
- Order: Lepidoptera
- Family: Hesperiidae
- Genus: Augiades
- Species: A. epimethea

Binomial name
- Augiades epimethea (Plötz, 1883)

Synonyms
- List: Phareas epimethea Plötz, 1883; Lignyostola bicolor Mabille & Boullet, 1919; Lignyostola cydana Schaus, 1902

= Augiades epimethea =

Species of butterfly

Augiades epimethea, the epimethea skipper, is a species of butterfly in the family Hesperiidae. It is found from Costa Rica to Bolivia, Guianas and Brazil.
