= Pseudothyretes kamitugensis =

Scientific classification
- Kingdom: Animalia
- Phylum: Arthropoda
- Class: Insecta
- Order: Lepidoptera
- Superfamily: Noctuoidea
- Family: Erebidae
- Subfamily: Arctiinae
- Genus: Pseudothyretes
- Species: P. kamitugensis

Binomial name
- Pseudothyretes kamitugensis (Dufrane, 1945)

Synonyms
- Apisa kamitugensis Dufrane, 1945

Species of moth

Pseudothyretes kamitugensis is a moth of the subfamily Arctiinae. It was described by Abel Dufrane in 1945. It is found in Burundi, the Democratic Republic of the Congo, Ghana, Kenya and Uganda.
