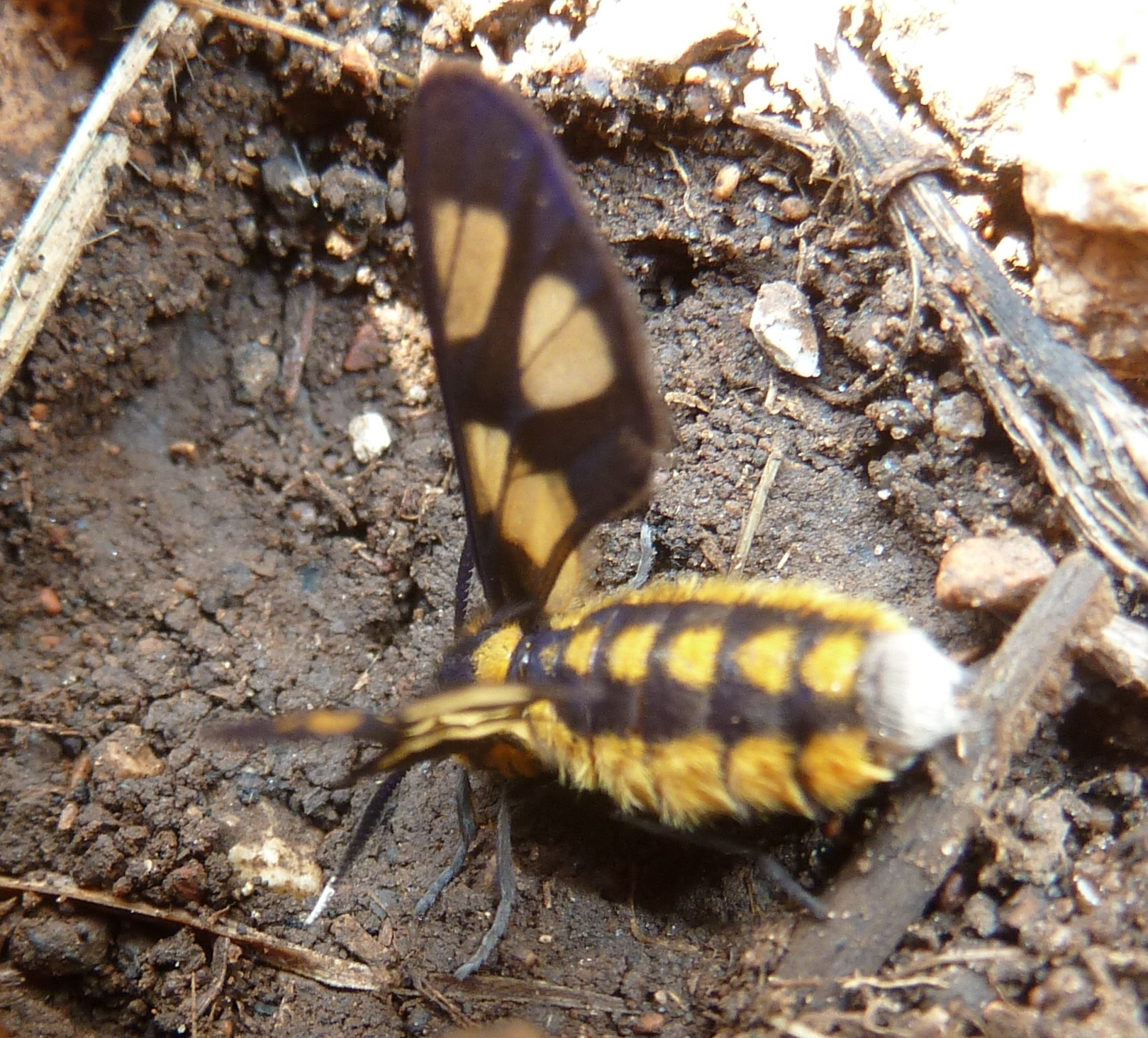

Scientific classification
- Kingdom: Animalia
- Phylum: Arthropoda
- Class: Insecta
- Order: Lepidoptera
- Superfamily: Noctuoidea
- Family: Erebidae
- Subfamily: Arctiinae
- Genus: Ceryx
- Species: C. anthraciformis

Binomial name
- Ceryx anthraciformis (Wallengren, 1860)

Synonyms
- Naclia anthraciformis Wallengren, 1860; Naclia fuscicornis Wallengren, 1860; Naclia pygmula Oberthür, 1878

= Ceryx anthraciformis =

Species of moth

Ceryx anthraciformis is a moth of the subfamily Arctiinae. It was described by Wallengren in 1860. It is found in South Africa.
