= Pseudodiptera dufranei =

Scientific classification
- Kingdom: Animalia
- Phylum: Arthropoda
- Class: Insecta
- Order: Lepidoptera
- Superfamily: Noctuoidea
- Family: Erebidae
- Subfamily: Arctiinae
- Genus: Pseudodiptera
- Species: P. dufranei

Binomial name
- Pseudodiptera dufranei (Kiriakoff, 1965)

Synonyms
- Pachyceryx dufranei Kiriakoff, 1965

Species of moth

Pseudodiptera dufranei is a moth of the family Erebidae. It was described by Sergius G. Kiriakoff in 1965. It is found in the Democratic Republic of the Congo.
