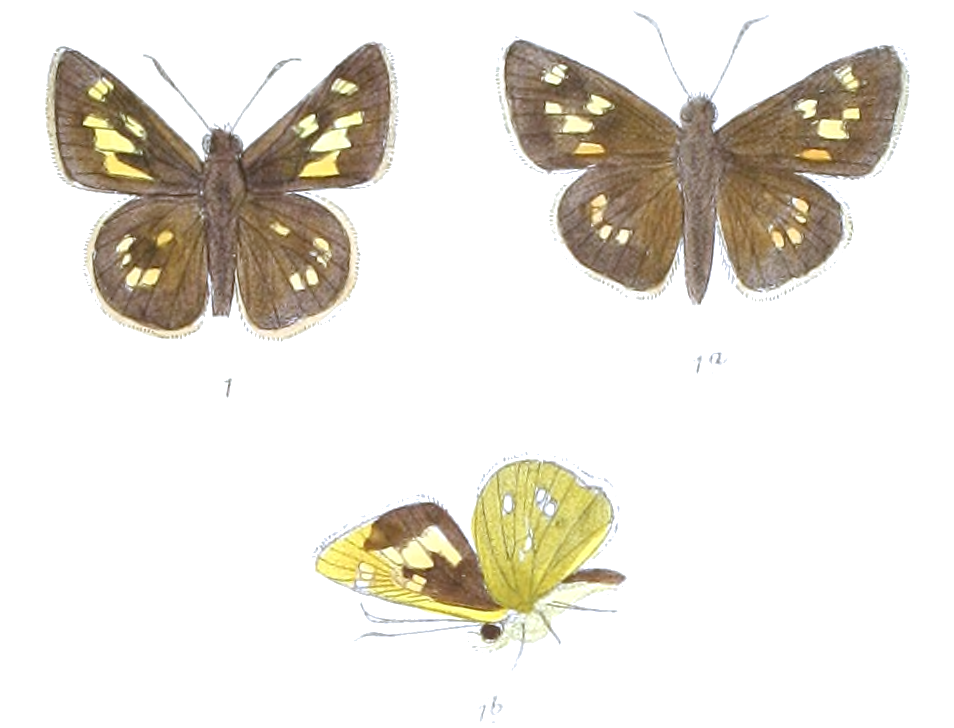

Scientific classification
- Kingdom: Animalia
- Phylum: Arthropoda
- Class: Insecta
- Order: Lepidoptera
- Family: Hesperiidae
- Subfamily: Eudaminae
- Tribe: Entheini
- Genus: Augiades; Hübner, [1819]

= Augiades =

Genus of butterflies

Augiades is a genus of butterflies in the family Hesperiidae, in which it is placed in tribe Entheini.

Augiades has two species, Augiades crinisus and Augiades epimethea.
