= Apisa rendalli =

Scientific classification
- Domain: Eukaryota
- Kingdom: Animalia
- Phylum: Arthropoda
- Class: Insecta
- Order: Lepidoptera
- Superfamily: Noctuoidea
- Family: Erebidae
- Subfamily: Arctiinae
- Genus: Apisa
- Species: A. rendalli

Binomial name
- Apisa rendalli Rothschild, 1910

Synonyms
- Apisa nyasae Kiriakoff, 1957

Species of moth

Apisa rendalli is a moth of the family Erebidae. It was described by Rothschild in 1910. It is found in the Democratic Republic of Congo, Ghana and Malawi.
