= Apisa subargentea =

Scientific classification
- Domain: Eukaryota
- Kingdom: Animalia
- Phylum: Arthropoda
- Class: Insecta
- Order: Lepidoptera
- Superfamily: Noctuoidea
- Family: Erebidae
- Subfamily: Arctiinae
- Genus: Apisa
- Species: A. subargentea

Binomial name
- Apisa subargentea Joicey & Talbot, 1921

Species of moth

Apisa subargentea is a moth of the family Erebidae. It was described by James John Joicey and George Talbot in 1921. It is found in Burundi, the Democratic Republic of the Congo, Kenya and Rwanda.
