= Myopsyche notoplagia =

Scientific classification
- Kingdom: Animalia
- Phylum: Arthropoda
- Class: Insecta
- Order: Lepidoptera
- Superfamily: Noctuoidea
- Family: Erebidae
- Subfamily: Arctiinae
- Genus: Myopsyche
- Species: M. notoplagia

Binomial name
- Myopsyche notoplagia Hampson, 1898

Species of moth

Myopsyche notoplagia is a moth of the subfamily Arctiinae. It was described by George Hampson in 1898. It is found in Ghana and Sierra Leone.
