= Ceryx sphenodes =

Scientific classification
- Kingdom: Animalia
- Phylum: Arthropoda
- Class: Insecta
- Order: Lepidoptera
- Superfamily: Noctuoidea
- Family: Erebidae
- Subfamily: Arctiinae
- Genus: Ceryx
- Species: C. sphenodes

Binomial name
- Ceryx sphenodes (Meyrick, 1886)

Synonyms
- Agaphthora sphenodes Meyrick, 1886; Ceryx darlingtoni Obraztsov, 1957

Species of moth

Ceryx sphenodes is a moth of the subfamily Arctiinae. It was described by Edward Meyrick in 1886. It is found in New Guinea and Queensland, Australia.
