= Apisa fontainei =

Scientific classification
- Domain: Eukaryota
- Kingdom: Animalia
- Phylum: Arthropoda
- Class: Insecta
- Order: Lepidoptera
- Superfamily: Noctuoidea
- Family: Erebidae
- Subfamily: Arctiinae
- Genus: Apisa
- Species: A. fontainei

Binomial name
- Apisa fontainei Kiriakoff, 1959

Species of moth

Apisa fontainei is a moth of the family Erebidae. It was described by Sergius G. Kiriakoff in 1959. It is found in the Democratic Republic of the Congo, Kenya and Rwanda.
