= Apisa cinereocostata =

Scientific classification
- Kingdom: Animalia
- Phylum: Arthropoda
- Class: Insecta
- Order: Lepidoptera
- Superfamily: Noctuoidea
- Family: Erebidae
- Subfamily: Arctiinae
- Genus: Apisa
- Species: A. cinereocostata

Binomial name
- Apisa cinereocostata Holland, 1893

Synonyms
- Apisa (Parapisa) bourgognei Kiriakoff, 1952

Species of moth

Apisa cinereocostata is a moth of the family Erebidae. It was described by William Jacob Holland in 1893. It is found in Gabon, Ghana, Guinea, Ivory Coast and Nigeria.
