= Ceryx evar =

Scientific classification
- Domain: Eukaryota
- Kingdom: Animalia
- Phylum: Arthropoda
- Class: Insecta
- Order: Lepidoptera
- Superfamily: Noctuoidea
- Family: Erebidae
- Subfamily: Arctiinae
- Genus: Ceryx
- Species: C. evar

Binomial name
- Ceryx evar (Pagenstecher, 1886)

Synonyms
- Syntomis evar Pagenstecher, 1886; Ceryx gracilis var. lugens Röber, 1891

Species of moth

Ceryx evar is a moth of the subfamily Arctiinae. It was described by Pagenstecher in 1886. It is found on Ambon Island, Aru and the Key Islands.
