= Apisa manettii =

Scientific classification
- Domain: Eukaryota
- Kingdom: Animalia
- Phylum: Arthropoda
- Class: Insecta
- Order: Lepidoptera
- Superfamily: Noctuoidea
- Family: Erebidae
- Subfamily: Arctiinae
- Genus: Apisa
- Species: A. manettii

Binomial name
- Apisa manettii Turati, 1924

Species of moth

Apisa manettii is a moth of the family Erebidae. It was described by Turati in 1924. It is found in Libya.
