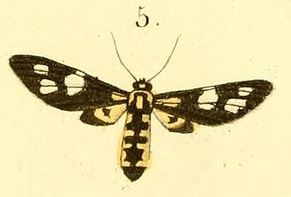

Scientific classification
- Kingdom: Animalia
- Phylum: Arthropoda
- Clade: Pancrustacea
- Class: Insecta
- Order: Lepidoptera
- Superfamily: Noctuoidea
- Family: Erebidae
- Subfamily: Arctiinae
- Genus: Stictonaclia
- Species: S. myodes

Binomial name
- Stictonaclia myodes (Guérin-Méneville, 1832)

Synonyms
- Syntomis myodes Guérin-Méneville, 1832; Naclia agnes Oberthür, 1893; Syntomis anapera Mabille, 1879; Naclia nathalia Oberthür, 1923

= Stictonaclia myodes =

Species of moth

Stictonaclia myodes is a moth of the subfamily Arctiinae. It was described by Félix Édouard Guérin-Méneville in 1832. It is found on Madagascar.
