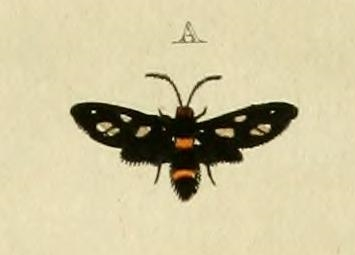

Scientific classification
- Domain: Eukaryota
- Kingdom: Animalia
- Phylum: Arthropoda
- Class: Insecta
- Order: Lepidoptera
- Superfamily: Noctuoidea
- Family: Erebidae
- Subfamily: Arctiinae
- Genus: Ceryx
- Species: C. diptera

Binomial name
- Ceryx diptera (Fabricius, 1775)

Synonyms
- Zygaena diptera Fabricius, 1775; Sphinx atereus Stoll, [1782]; Syntomis incipiens Walker, [1865]; Psychotoe brachypecten Hampson, 1893

= Ceryx diptera =

Species of moth

Ceryx diptera is a moth of the subfamily Arctiinae. It was described by Johan Christian Fabricius in 1775. It is found in southern India and Sri Lanka. In male, the body is black. Frons, collar and tegulae are yellow. Forewings with a sub-basal, two medial, one sub-apical and two sub-marginal hyaline (glass-like) spots. Hindwings with a sub-basal joined to a sub-marginal spot. Tarsi black. Female is similar to male, but differ with the abdomen dilated and with a tuft of ochreous hairs.
