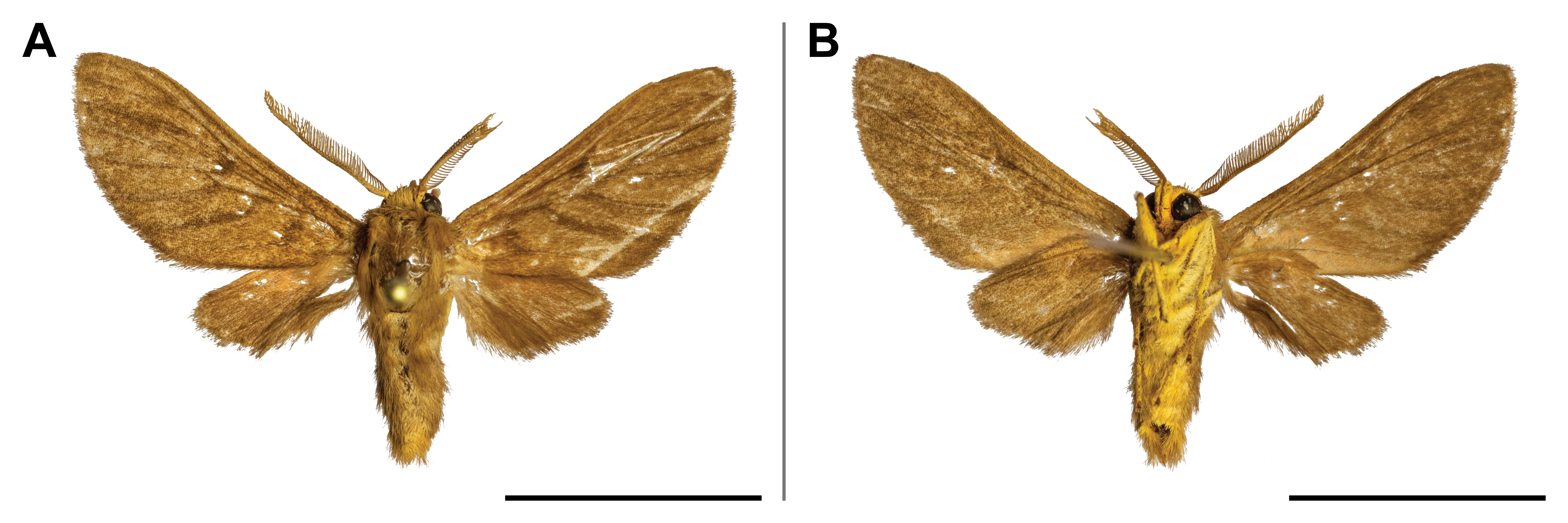

Scientific classification
- Kingdom: Animalia
- Phylum: Arthropoda
- Class: Insecta
- Order: Lepidoptera
- Superfamily: Noctuoidea
- Family: Erebidae
- Subfamily: Arctiinae
- Genus: Anapisa
- Species: A. holobrunnea

Binomial name
- Anapisa holobrunnea (Tams, 1932)

Synonyms
- Apisa holobrunnea Tams, 1932

= Anapisa holobrunnea =

Species of moth

Anapisa holobrunnea is a moth of the family Erebidae. It was described by Willie Horace Thomas Tams in 1932. It is found in Ghana and Guinea.
