= Ceryx pleurasticta =

Scientific classification
- Kingdom: Animalia
- Phylum: Arthropoda
- Class: Insecta
- Order: Lepidoptera
- Superfamily: Noctuoidea
- Family: Erebidae
- Subfamily: Arctiinae
- Genus: Ceryx
- Species: C. pleurasticta

Binomial name
- Ceryx pleurasticta Hampson, 1901

Synonyms
- Ceryx laterimacula Zerny

Species of moth

Ceryx pleurasticta is a moth of the subfamily Arctiinae. It was described by George Hampson in 1901. It is found in India.
