= Ceryx burgeffi =

Scientific classification
- Domain: Eukaryota
- Kingdom: Animalia
- Phylum: Arthropoda
- Class: Insecta
- Order: Lepidoptera
- Superfamily: Noctuoidea
- Family: Erebidae
- Subfamily: Arctiinae
- Genus: Ceryx
- Species: C. burgeffi

Binomial name
- Ceryx burgeffi Obraztsov, 1949

Species of moth

Ceryx burgeffi is a moth of the subfamily Arctiinae. It was described by Obraztsov in 1949. It is found on Java.
