= Pseudodiptera =

Scientific classification
- Domain: Eukaryota
- Kingdom: Animalia
- Phylum: Arthropoda
- Class: Insecta
- Order: Lepidoptera
- Superfamily: Noctuoidea
- Family: Erebidae
- Subfamily: Arctiinae
- Tribe: Syntomini
- Genus: Pseudodiptera; Kaye, 1918

Synonyms
- Pachyceryx Kiriakoff, 195

Genus of moths

Pseudodiptera is a genus of moths in the family Erebidae.

== Species ==
- Pseudodiptera alberici (Dufrane, 1945)
- Pseudodiptera clypeatus (Kiriakoff, 1965)
- Pseudodiptera dufranei (Kiriakoff, 1965)
- Pseudodiptera musiforme Kaye, 1918
