= Ceryx ciprianii =

Scientific classification
- Kingdom: Animalia
- Phylum: Arthropoda
- Class: Insecta
- Order: Lepidoptera
- Superfamily: Noctuoidea
- Family: Erebidae
- Subfamily: Arctiinae
- Genus: Ceryx
- Species: C. ciprianii

Binomial name
- Ceryx ciprianii Berio, 1937

Species of moth

Ceryx ciprianii is a moth of the subfamily Arctiinae. It was described by Emilio Berio in 1937 and is found in the Democratic Republic of the Congo.
