= Ceryx swinhoei =

Scientific classification
- Domain: Eukaryota
- Kingdom: Animalia
- Phylum: Arthropoda
- Class: Insecta
- Order: Lepidoptera
- Superfamily: Noctuoidea
- Family: Erebidae
- Subfamily: Arctiinae
- Genus: Ceryx
- Species: C. swinhoei

Binomial name
- Ceryx swinhoei Bethune-Baker, 1904

Species of moth

Ceryx swinhoei is a moth of the subfamily Arctiinae. It was described by George Thomas Bethune-Baker in 1904. It is found in New Guinea.
