= Ceryx barombina =

Scientific classification
- Kingdom: Animalia
- Phylum: Arthropoda
- Class: Insecta
- Order: Lepidoptera
- Superfamily: Noctuoidea
- Family: Erebidae
- Subfamily: Arctiinae
- Genus: Ceryx
- Species: C. barombina

Binomial name
- Ceryx barombina Gaede, 1926

Species of moth

Ceryx barombina is a moth of the subfamily Arctiinae. It was described by Max Gaede in 1926. It is found in Cameroon.
