= Ceryx sambavana =

Scientific classification
- Kingdom: Animalia
- Phylum: Arthropoda
- Class: Insecta
- Order: Lepidoptera
- Superfamily: Noctuoidea
- Family: Erebidae
- Subfamily: Arctiinae
- Genus: Ceryx
- Species: C. sambavana

Binomial name
- Ceryx sambavana Hampson

Species of moth

Ceryx sambavana is a moth of the subfamily Arctiinae. It was described by George Hampson.
