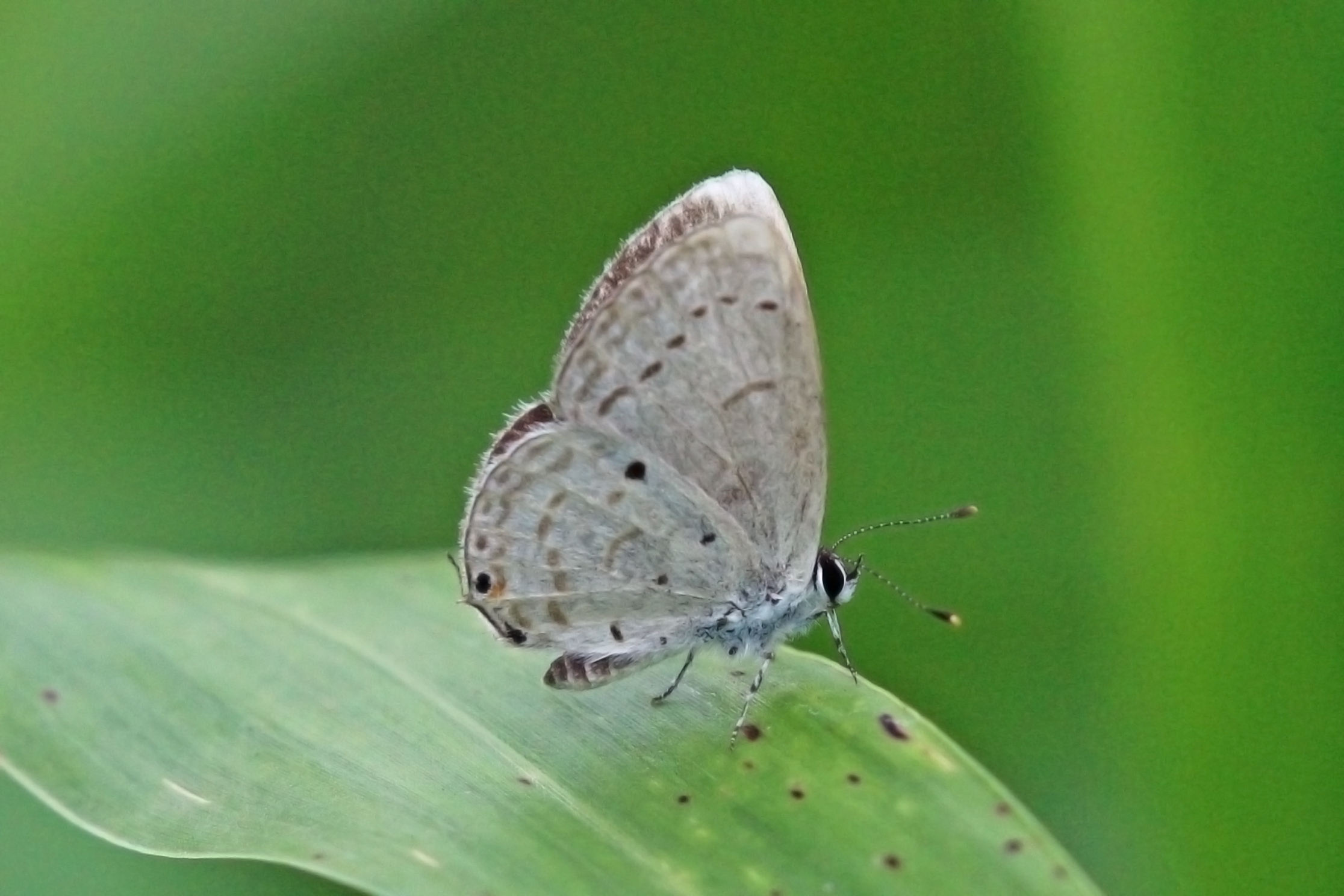
- Thermoniphas micylus

Scientific classification
- Domain: Eukaryota
- Kingdom: Animalia
- Phylum: Arthropoda
- Class: Insecta
- Order: Lepidoptera
- Family: Lycaenidae
- Subfamily: Polyommatinae
- Tribe: Polyommatini
- Genus: Thermoniphas; Karsch, 1895

= Thermoniphas =

Butterfly genus in family Lycaenidae

Thermoniphas is an Afrotropical genus of butterflies in the family Lycaenidae.

== Species ==
- Thermoniphas alberici (Dufrane, 1945)
- Thermoniphas albocaerulea Stempffer, 1956
- Thermoniphas bibundana (Grünberg, 1910)
- Thermoniphas caerulea Stempffer, 1956
- Thermoniphas colorata (Ungemach, 1932)
- Thermoniphas distincta (Talbot, 1935)
- Thermoniphas fontainei Stempffer, 1956
- Thermoniphas fumosa Stempffer, 1952
- Thermoniphas kamitugensis (Dufrane, 1945)
- Thermoniphas kigezi Stempffer, 1956
- Thermoniphas leucocyanea Clench, 1961
- Thermoniphas micylus (Cramer, 1780)
- Thermoniphas plurilimbata Karsch, 1895
- Thermoniphas stempfferi Clench, 1961
- Thermoniphas togara (Plötz, 1880)
