= Thermoniphas bibundana =

Scientific classification
- Kingdom: Animalia
- Phylum: Arthropoda
- Clade: Pancrustacea
- Class: Insecta
- Order: Lepidoptera
- Family: Lycaenidae
- Genus: Thermoniphas
- Species: T. bibundana

Binomial name
- Thermoniphas bibundana (Grünberg, 1910)

Synonyms
- Cupido bibundana Grünberg, 1910

Species of butterfly

Thermoniphas bibundana, the Cameroon chalk blue, is a butterfly in the family Lycaenidae. It is found in Cameroon.
