= Ceryx hageni =

Scientific classification
- Kingdom: Animalia
- Phylum: Arthropoda
- Class: Insecta
- Order: Lepidoptera
- Superfamily: Noctuoidea
- Family: Erebidae
- Subfamily: Arctiinae
- Genus: Ceryx
- Species: C. hageni

Binomial name
- Ceryx hageni (Snellen, 1895)

Synonyms
- Syntomoides hageni Snellen, 1895; Ceryx flavibasis Hampson, 1898

Species of moth

Ceryx hageni is a moth of the subfamily Arctiinae. It was described by Snellen in 1895. It is found on Sumatra.
