= Ceryx semicincta =

Scientific classification
- Kingdom: Animalia
- Phylum: Arthropoda
- Class: Insecta
- Order: Lepidoptera
- Superfamily: Noctuoidea
- Family: Erebidae
- Subfamily: Arctiinae
- Genus: Ceryx
- Species: C. semicincta

Binomial name
- Ceryx semicincta (Hampson, 1895)

Synonyms
- Syntomoides semicincta Hampson, 1895

Species of moth

Ceryx semicincta is a moth of the subfamily Arctiinae. It was described by George Hampson in 1895. It is found on Tenasserim, Malacca and Borneo.
