= Pseudodiptera musiforme =

Scientific classification
- Kingdom: Animalia
- Phylum: Arthropoda
- Class: Insecta
- Order: Lepidoptera
- Superfamily: Noctuoidea
- Family: Erebidae
- Subfamily: Arctiinae
- Genus: Pseudodiptera
- Species: P. musiforme

Binomial name
- Pseudodiptera musiforme Kaye, 1918

Synonyms
- Pachyceryx albomaculata Kiriakoff, 1957

Species of moth

Pseudodiptera musiforme is a moth of the family Erebidae. It was described by William James Kaye in 1918. It is found in the Democratic Republic of the Congo and Chad.
