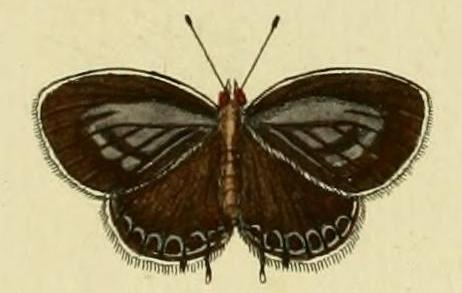

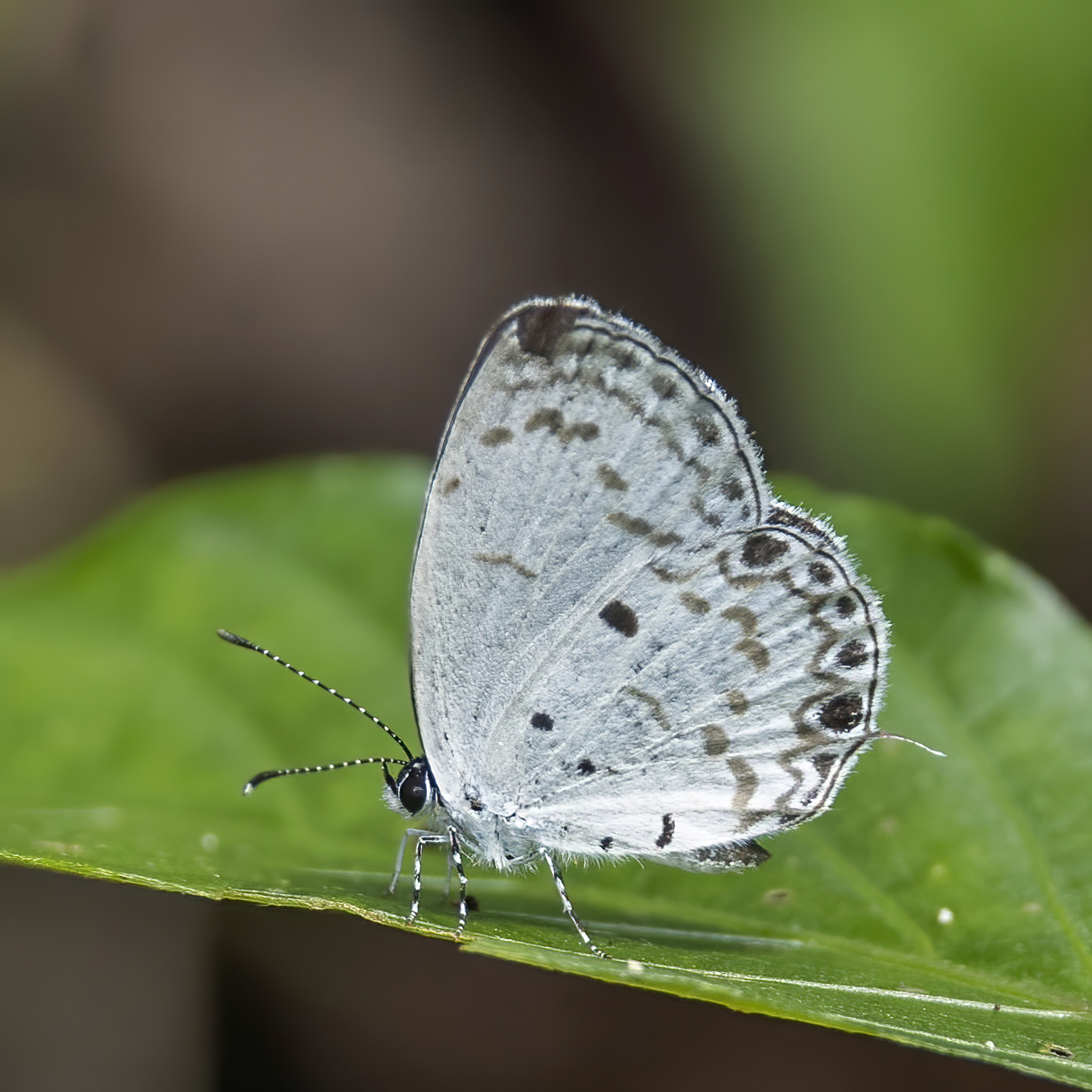
- In Ghana

Scientific classification
- Kingdom: Animalia
- Phylum: Arthropoda
- Clade: Pancrustacea
- Class: Insecta
- Order: Lepidoptera
- Family: Lycaenidae
- Genus: Thermoniphas
- Species: T. micylus

Binomial name
- Thermoniphas micylus (Cramer, 1780)

Synonyms
- Papilio micylus Cramer, 1780

= Thermoniphas micylus =

Species of butterfly

Thermoniphas micylus, the tinted blue or the common chalk blue, is a butterfly in the family Lycaenidae. It is found in Guinea, Sierra Leone, Liberia, Ivory Coast, Ghana, Togo, Nigeria (south and the Cross River loop) and western Cameroon. The habitat consists of forest edges, paths and clearings.

Both sexes are attracted to flowers.

Torben Larsen developed a species numbering system for his 2005 publication Butterflies of West Africa. This species is #617. The 'Larsen' numbers have since been used with permission in A Sharp Eye on Butterflies of Ghana.
