= Pseudothyretes =

Scientific classification
- Kingdom: Animalia
- Phylum: Arthropoda
- Class: Insecta
- Order: Lepidoptera
- Superfamily: Noctuoidea
- Family: Erebidae
- Subfamily: Arctiinae
- Tribe: Syntomini
- Genus: Pseudothyretes; Dufrane, 1945

Synonyms
- Diakonoffia Kiriakoff, 1953

Genus of moths

Pseudothyretes is a genus of moth in the subfamily Arctiinae.

== Species ==
- Pseudothyretes carnea (Hampson, 1898)
- Pseudothyretes erubescens (Hampson, 1901)
- Pseudothyretes kamitugensis (Dufrane, 1945)
- Pseudothyretes mariae Dufrane, 1945
- Pseudothyretes nigrita (Kiriakoff, 1961)
- Pseudothyretes perpusilla (Walker, 1856)
- Pseudothyretes rubicundula (Strand, 1912)
