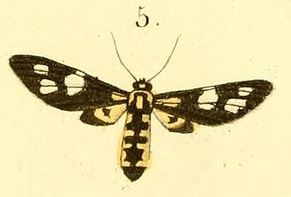
- Stictonaclia myodes

Scientific classification
- Kingdom: Animalia
- Phylum: Arthropoda
- Class: Insecta
- Order: Lepidoptera
- Superfamily: Noctuoidea
- Family: Erebidae
- Subfamily: Arctiinae
- Tribe: Syntomini
- Genus: Stictonaclia; Hampson, 1898

= Stictonaclia =

Genus of moths

Stictonaclia is a genus of moths in the subfamily Arctiinae.

== Species ==
- Stictonaclia anastasia Oberthür, 1893
- Stictonaclia andriai Griveaud, 1964
- Stictonaclia blandina (Oberthür, 1893)
- Stictonaclia marojejyensis Griveaud, 1964
- Stictonaclia myodes Guérin-Meneville, 1893
- Stictonaclia reducta Mabille, 1878
- Stictonaclia seyrigi Griveaud, 1964
- Stictonaclia subflava Griveaud, 1964

== Former species ==
- Stictonaclia amplificata (Saalmüller, 1880)
