= Ceryx pseudovigorsi =

Scientific classification
- Domain: Eukaryota
- Kingdom: Animalia
- Phylum: Arthropoda
- Class: Insecta
- Order: Lepidoptera
- Superfamily: Noctuoidea
- Family: Erebidae
- Subfamily: Arctiinae
- Genus: Ceryx
- Species: C. pseudovigorsi

Binomial name
- Ceryx pseudovigorsi Nieuwenhuis, 1946

Species of moth

Ceryx pseudovigorsi is a moth of the subfamily Arctiinae. It was described by Nieuwenhuis in 1946. It is found on Sulawesi.
