= Apisa arabica =

Scientific classification
- Domain: Eukaryota
- Kingdom: Animalia
- Phylum: Arthropoda
- Class: Insecta
- Order: Lepidoptera
- Superfamily: Noctuoidea
- Family: Erebidae
- Subfamily: Arctiinae
- Genus: Apisa
- Species: A. arabica

Binomial name
- Apisa arabica Warnecke, 1934

Synonyms
- Apisa lippensi Kiriakoff, 1960

Species of moth

Apisa arabica is a moth of the family Erebidae. It was described by Georg Heinrich Gerhard Warnecke in 1934. It is found in Saudi Arabia.
