= Ceryx guttulosa =

Scientific classification
- Kingdom: Animalia
- Phylum: Arthropoda
- Class: Insecta
- Order: Lepidoptera
- Superfamily: Noctuoidea
- Family: Erebidae
- Subfamily: Arctiinae
- Genus: Ceryx
- Species: C. guttulosa

Binomial name
- Ceryx guttulosa (Walker, 1864)

Synonyms
- Syntomis guttulosa Walker, [1865]; Agaphthora melanora Meyrick, 1886; Syntomis metan Pagenstecher, 1886

Species of moth

Ceryx guttulosa is a moth of the subfamily Arctiinae. It was described by Francis Walker in 1864. It is found in Aru, the Key Islands and in Australia (Queensland: Cape York), Malaysia and Thailand.
