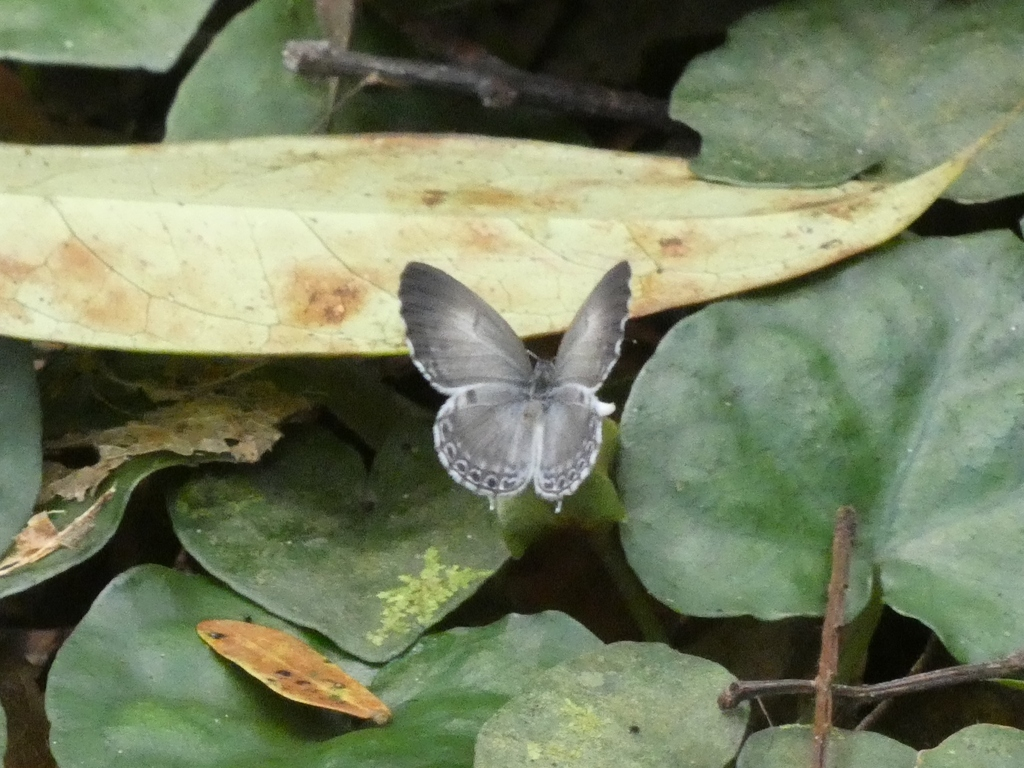

Scientific classification
- Kingdom: Animalia
- Phylum: Arthropoda
- Class: Insecta
- Order: Lepidoptera
- Family: Lycaenidae
- Genus: Thermoniphas
- Species: T. fumosa

Binomial name
- Thermoniphas fumosa Stempffer, 1952

= Thermoniphas fumosa =

Species of butterfly

Thermoniphas fumosa, the smoky chalk blue, is a butterfly in the family Lycaenidae. It is found in Nigeria (east and the Cross River loop), Cameroon, Gabon, the Republic of the Congo, the Central African Republic and the Democratic Republic of the Congo (Mayumbe). The habitat consists of clearings in submontane forests and lowland forests.
