= Ceryx keiensis =

Scientific classification
- Domain: Eukaryota
- Kingdom: Animalia
- Phylum: Arthropoda
- Class: Insecta
- Order: Lepidoptera
- Superfamily: Noctuoidea
- Family: Erebidae
- Subfamily: Arctiinae
- Genus: Ceryx
- Species: C. keiensis

Binomial name
- Ceryx keiensis Rothschild, 1910

Species of moth

Ceryx keiensis is a moth of the subfamily Arctiinae. It was described by Rothschild in 1910. It is found on the Key Islands.
