= Ceryx helodiaphana =

Scientific classification
- Domain: Eukaryota
- Kingdom: Animalia
- Phylum: Arthropoda
- Class: Insecta
- Order: Lepidoptera
- Superfamily: Noctuoidea
- Family: Erebidae
- Subfamily: Arctiinae
- Genus: Ceryx
- Species: C. helodiaphana

Binomial name
- Ceryx helodiaphana Roepke, 1937

Species of moth

Ceryx helodiaphana is a moth of the subfamily Arctiinae. It was described by Roepke in 1937. It is found on Java.
