= Ceryx ampla =

Scientific classification
- Kingdom: Animalia
- Phylum: Arthropoda
- Class: Insecta
- Order: Lepidoptera
- Superfamily: Noctuoidea
- Family: Erebidae
- Subfamily: Arctiinae
- Genus: Ceryx
- Species: C. ampla

Binomial name
- Ceryx ampla (Walker, 1864)

Synonyms
- Syntomis ampla Walker, [1865]

Species of moth

Ceryx ampla is a moth of the subfamily Arctiinae. It was described by Francis Walker in 1864. It is found on Aru in Indonesia and Papua New Guinea.
