= Ceryx basilewskyi =

Scientific classification
- Domain: Eukaryota
- Kingdom: Animalia
- Phylum: Arthropoda
- Class: Insecta
- Order: Lepidoptera
- Superfamily: Noctuoidea
- Family: Erebidae
- Subfamily: Arctiinae
- Genus: Ceryx
- Species: C. basilewskyi

Binomial name
- Ceryx basilewskyi Kiriakoff, 1955

Species of moth

Ceryx basilewskyi is a moth of the family Erebidae. It was described by Sergius G. Kiriakoff in 1955. It is found in Burundi.
