= Thermoniphas colorata =

Scientific classification
- Domain: Eukaryota
- Kingdom: Animalia
- Phylum: Arthropoda
- Class: Insecta
- Order: Lepidoptera
- Family: Lycaenidae
- Genus: Thermoniphas
- Species: T. colorata

Binomial name
- Thermoniphas colorata (Ungemach, 1932)

Synonyms
- Everes togara colorata Ungemach, 1932; Thermoniphas micylus colorata

Species of butterfly

Thermoniphas colorata is a butterfly in the family Lycaenidae. It is found along the coast of Kenya and in Ethiopia, eastern Tanzania, Malawi, Zambia, Mozambique and north-western Zimbabwe. The habitat consists of marshy areas in and on the edges of forests.

Both sexes are attracted to flowers.

The larvae feed on Calvoa orientalis and Dissotis species.
