= Anapisa vanoyei =

Scientific classification
- Kingdom: Animalia
- Phylum: Arthropoda
- Class: Insecta
- Order: Lepidoptera
- Superfamily: Noctuoidea
- Family: Erebidae
- Subfamily: Arctiinae
- Genus: Anapisa
- Species: A. vanoyei

Binomial name
- Anapisa vanoyei Kiriakoff, 1952

Species of moth

Anapisa vanoyei is a moth of the family Erebidae. It was described by Sergius G. Kiriakoff in 1952. It is found in the Democratic Republic of the Congo.
