= Ceryx claremontii =

Scientific classification
- Domain: Eukaryota
- Kingdom: Animalia
- Phylum: Arthropoda
- Class: Insecta
- Order: Lepidoptera
- Superfamily: Noctuoidea
- Family: Erebidae
- Subfamily: Arctiinae
- Genus: Ceryx
- Species: C. claremontii

Binomial name
- Ceryx claremontii (Heylaerts, 1890)

Synonyms
- Syntomis claremontii Heylaerts, 1890

Species of moth

Ceryx claremontii is a moth of the family Erebidae (subfamily Arctiinae). It was described by Franciscus J. M. Heylaerts in 1890. It is found on Sumatra and Java.
