= Myopsyche makomensis =

Scientific classification
- Domain: Eukaryota
- Kingdom: Animalia
- Phylum: Arthropoda
- Class: Insecta
- Order: Lepidoptera
- Superfamily: Noctuoidea
- Family: Erebidae
- Subfamily: Arctiinae
- Genus: Myopsyche
- Species: M. makomensis

Binomial name
- Myopsyche makomensis Strand, 1912

Species of moth

Myopsyche makomensis is a moth of the subfamily Arctiinae. It was described by Strand in 1912. It is found in Equatorial Guinea and Sierra Leone.
