= Ceryx morobeensis =

Scientific classification
- Domain: Eukaryota
- Kingdom: Animalia
- Phylum: Arthropoda
- Class: Insecta
- Order: Lepidoptera
- Superfamily: Noctuoidea
- Family: Erebidae
- Subfamily: Arctiinae
- Genus: Ceryx
- Species: C. morobeensis

Binomial name
- Ceryx morobeensis Obraztsov, 1957

Species of moth

Ceryx morobeensis is a moth of the subfamily Arctiinae. It was described by Obraztsov in 1957. It is found in New Guinea.

The length of the forewings is about 14 mm (0.55 in).
