= Apisa hildae =

Scientific classification
- Domain: Eukaryota
- Kingdom: Animalia
- Phylum: Arthropoda
- Class: Insecta
- Order: Lepidoptera
- Superfamily: Noctuoidea
- Family: Erebidae
- Subfamily: Arctiinae
- Genus: Apisa
- Species: A. hildae

Binomial name
- Apisa hildae Kiriakoff, 1961

Species of insect

Apisa hildae is a moth of the family Erebidae. It was described by Sergius G. Kiriakoff in 1961. It is found in Namibia.
