= Ceryx cherra =

Scientific classification
- Domain: Eukaryota
- Kingdom: Animalia
- Phylum: Arthropoda
- Class: Insecta
- Order: Lepidoptera
- Superfamily: Noctuoidea
- Family: Erebidae
- Subfamily: Arctiinae
- Genus: Ceryx
- Species: C. cherra

Binomial name
- Ceryx cherra (Moore, 1879)

Synonyms
- Syntomis cherra Moore, 1879; Syntomoides quisqualis Swinhoe, 1894

Species of moth

Ceryx cherra is a moth of the subfamily Arctiinae. It was described by Frederic Moore in 1879. It is found in Assam, India.
