= Thermoniphas stempfferi =

Scientific classification
- Kingdom: Animalia
- Phylum: Arthropoda
- Class: Insecta
- Order: Lepidoptera
- Family: Lycaenidae
- Genus: Thermoniphas
- Species: T. stempfferi

Binomial name
- Thermoniphas stempfferi Clench, 1961

Species of butterfly

Thermoniphas stempfferi is a butterfly in the family Lycaenidae. It is found in Cameroon.
