= Ceryx puncta =

Scientific classification
- Kingdom: Animalia
- Phylum: Arthropoda
- Class: Insecta
- Order: Lepidoptera
- Superfamily: Noctuoidea
- Family: Erebidae
- Subfamily: Arctiinae
- Genus: Ceryx
- Species: C. puncta

Binomial name
- Ceryx puncta (H. Druce, 1898)

Synonyms
- Agaphthora puncta H. Druce, 1898

Species of moth

Ceryx puncta is a moth of the subfamily Arctiinae. It was described by Herbert Druce in 1898. It is found on New Guinea.
