= Ceryx lamottei =

Scientific classification
- Domain: Eukaryota
- Kingdom: Animalia
- Phylum: Arthropoda
- Class: Insecta
- Order: Lepidoptera
- Superfamily: Noctuoidea
- Family: Erebidae
- Subfamily: Arctiinae
- Genus: Ceryx
- Species: C. lamottei

Binomial name
- Ceryx lamottei Kiriakoff, 1963

Species of moth

Ceryx lamottei is a moth of the subfamily Arctiinae. It was described by Sergius G. Kiriakoff in 1963. It was described from Nimba.
