= Thermoniphas caerulea =

Scientific classification
- Domain: Eukaryota
- Kingdom: Animalia
- Phylum: Arthropoda
- Class: Insecta
- Order: Lepidoptera
- Family: Lycaenidae
- Genus: Thermoniphas
- Species: T. caerulea

Binomial name
- Thermoniphas caerulea Stempffer, 1956

Species of butterfly

Thermoniphas caerulea is a butterfly in the family Lycaenidae. It is found in Uganda (from the south-western part of the country to the Kigezi District).
