= Ceryx pleurostictoides =

Scientific classification
- Domain: Eukaryota
- Kingdom: Animalia
- Phylum: Arthropoda
- Class: Insecta
- Order: Lepidoptera
- Superfamily: Noctuoidea
- Family: Erebidae
- Subfamily: Arctiinae
- Genus: Ceryx
- Species: C. pleurostictoides

Binomial name
- Ceryx pleurostictoides Strand, 1915

Species of moth

Ceryx pleurostictoides is a moth of the subfamily Arctiinae. It was described by Strand in 1915. It is found in Taiwan.
