= Ceryx bernhardi =

Scientific classification
- Domain: Eukaryota
- Kingdom: Animalia
- Phylum: Arthropoda
- Class: Insecta
- Order: Lepidoptera
- Superfamily: Noctuoidea
- Family: Erebidae
- Subfamily: Arctiinae
- Genus: Ceryx
- Species: C. bernhardi

Binomial name
- Ceryx bernhardi Seitz

Synonyms
- Ceryx hageni Seitz

Species of moth

Ceryx bernhardi is a moth of the subfamily Arctiinae. It was described by Seitz.
