= Ceryx ginorea =

Scientific classification
- Domain: Eukaryota
- Kingdom: Animalia
- Phylum: Arthropoda
- Class: Insecta
- Order: Lepidoptera
- Superfamily: Noctuoidea
- Family: Erebidae
- Subfamily: Arctiinae
- Genus: Ceryx
- Species: C. ginorea

Binomial name
- Ceryx ginorea (C. Swinhoe, 1894)

Synonyms
- Eressa ginorea C. Swinhoe, 1894

Species of moth

Ceryx ginorea is a moth of the subfamily Arctiinae. It was described by Charles Swinhoe in 1894. It is found in Assam, India.
