= Ceryx hyalina =

Scientific classification
- Domain: Eukaryota
- Kingdom: Animalia
- Phylum: Arthropoda
- Class: Insecta
- Order: Lepidoptera
- Superfamily: Noctuoidea
- Family: Erebidae
- Subfamily: Arctiinae
- Genus: Ceryx
- Species: C. hyalina

Binomial name
- Ceryx hyalina Moore, 1879

Synonyms
- Syntomis hyalina Moore, 1879; Syntomis volans Swinhoe, 1890

Species of moth

Ceryx hyalina is a moth of the subfamily Arctiinae. It was described by Frederic Moore in 1879. It is found in Myanmar and the Indian states of Sikkim and Assam.
