= Anapisa cleta =

Scientific classification
- Kingdom: Animalia
- Phylum: Arthropoda
- Class: Insecta
- Order: Lepidoptera
- Superfamily: Noctuoidea
- Family: Erebidae
- Subfamily: Arctiinae
- Genus: Anapisa
- Species: A. cleta

Binomial name
- Anapisa cleta (Plötz, 1880)

Synonyms
- Syntomis cleta Plötz, 1880

Species of moth

Anapisa cleta is a moth of the family Erebidae. It was described by Plötz in 1880. It is found in Cameroon.
