= Stictonaclia reducta =

Scientific classification
- Kingdom: Animalia
- Phylum: Arthropoda
- Class: Insecta
- Order: Lepidoptera
- Superfamily: Noctuoidea
- Family: Erebidae
- Subfamily: Arctiinae
- Genus: Stictonaclia
- Species: S. reducta

Binomial name
- Stictonaclia reducta (Mabille, 1878)

Synonyms
- Syntomis reducta Mabille, 1878; Naclia (Dysauxes) maria ab. albinescens Oberthür, 1923; Naclia (Dysauxes) maria ab. confluens Oberthür, 1923; Stictonaclia maria var. hova Strand, 1920; Naclia maria Oberthür, 1909; Syntomis zygaenoides Mabille, 1884

Species of moth

Stictonaclia reducta is a moth in the subfamily Arctiinae. It was described by Paul Mabille in 1878. It is found on Madagascar.
