= Ceryx flaviplagia =

Scientific classification
- Kingdom: Animalia
- Phylum: Arthropoda
- Class: Insecta
- Order: Lepidoptera
- Superfamily: Noctuoidea
- Family: Erebidae
- Subfamily: Arctiinae
- Genus: Ceryx
- Species: C. flaviplagia

Binomial name
- Ceryx flaviplagia Hampson, 1898

Species of moth

Ceryx flaviplagia is a moth of the subfamily Arctiinae. It was described by George Hampson in 1898. It is found in the Philippines.
