= Ceryx chea =

Scientific classification
- Domain: Eukaryota
- Kingdom: Animalia
- Phylum: Arthropoda
- Class: Insecta
- Order: Lepidoptera
- Superfamily: Noctuoidea
- Family: Erebidae
- Subfamily: Arctiinae
- Genus: Ceryx
- Species: C. chea

Binomial name
- Ceryx chea (H. Druce, 1895)

Synonyms
- Syntomis chea H. Druce, 1895

Species of moth

Ceryx chea is a moth of the subfamily Arctiinae. It was described by Herbert Druce in 1895. It is found on the Philippines.
