= Ceryx crawshayi =

Scientific classification
- Kingdom: Animalia
- Phylum: Arthropoda
- Class: Insecta
- Order: Lepidoptera
- Superfamily: Noctuoidea
- Family: Erebidae
- Subfamily: Arctiinae
- Genus: Ceryx
- Species: C. crawshayi

Binomial name
- Ceryx crawshayi Hampson, 1901

Synonyms
- Ceryx craushayi Hampson, 1914

Species of moth

Ceryx crawshayi is a moth of the family Erebidae. It was described by George Hampson in 1901. It is found in the Democratic Republic of the Congo and Kenya.
