= Apisa subcanescens =

Scientific classification
- Domain: Eukaryota
- Kingdom: Animalia
- Phylum: Arthropoda
- Class: Insecta
- Order: Lepidoptera
- Superfamily: Noctuoidea
- Family: Erebidae
- Subfamily: Arctiinae
- Genus: Apisa
- Species: A. subcanescens

Binomial name
- Apisa subcanescens Rothschild, 1910

Species of moth

Apisa subcanescens is a species of moth of the family Erebidae. It was described by Walter Rothschild in 1910. It is found in Eritrea, Senegal and Tanzania.
