= Anapisa endoxantha =

Scientific classification
- Kingdom: Animalia
- Phylum: Arthropoda
- Class: Insecta
- Order: Lepidoptera
- Superfamily: Noctuoidea
- Family: Erebidae
- Subfamily: Arctiinae
- Genus: Anapisa
- Species: A. endoxantha

Binomial name
- Anapisa endoxantha (Hampson, 1914)

Synonyms
- Apisa endoxantha Hampson, 1914

Species of moth

Anapisa endoxantha is a moth of the family Erebidae. It was described by George Hampson in 1914. It is found in Uganda.
