= Ceryx cybelistes =

Scientific classification
- Domain: Eukaryota
- Kingdom: Animalia
- Phylum: Arthropoda
- Class: Insecta
- Order: Lepidoptera
- Superfamily: Noctuoidea
- Family: Erebidae
- Subfamily: Arctiinae
- Genus: Ceryx
- Species: C. cybelistes

Binomial name
- Ceryx cybelistes (Holland, 1893)

Synonyms
- Syntomis cybelistes Holland, 1893

Species of moth

Ceryx cybelistes is a moth of the subfamily Arctiinae. It was described by William Jacob Holland in 1893. It is found in Gabon, Ghana and Uganda.
