= Ceryx formicina =

Scientific classification
- Domain: Eukaryota
- Kingdom: Animalia
- Phylum: Arthropoda
- Class: Insecta
- Order: Lepidoptera
- Superfamily: Noctuoidea
- Family: Erebidae
- Subfamily: Arctiinae
- Genus: Ceryx
- Species: C. formicina

Binomial name
- Ceryx formicina C. Swinhoe, 1892

Synonyms
- Syntomis formicina C. Swinhoe, 1892

Species of moth

Ceryx formicina is a moth of the subfamily Arctiinae. It was described by Charles Swinhoe in 1892. It is found on New Guinea.
