= Myopsyche langi =

Scientific classification
- Domain: Eukaryota
- Kingdom: Animalia
- Phylum: Arthropoda
- Class: Insecta
- Order: Lepidoptera
- Superfamily: Noctuoidea
- Family: Erebidae
- Subfamily: Arctiinae
- Genus: Myopsyche
- Species: M. langi

Binomial name
- Myopsyche langi Holland, 1920

Species of moth

Myopsyche langi is a moth of the subfamily Arctiinae. It was described by William Jacob Holland in 1920. It is found in the Democratic Republic of the Congo.
