= Myopsyche ochsenheimeri =

Scientific classification
- Domain: Eukaryota
- Kingdom: Animalia
- Phylum: Arthropoda
- Class: Insecta
- Order: Lepidoptera
- Superfamily: Noctuoidea
- Family: Erebidae
- Subfamily: Arctiinae
- Genus: Myopsyche
- Species: M. ochsenheimeri

Binomial name
- Myopsyche ochsenheimeri (Boisduval, 1829)

Synonyms
- Zygaena ochsenheimeri Boisduval, 1829; Syntomis ponga Plötz, 1880

Species of moth

Myopsyche ochsenheimeri is a moth of the subfamily Arctiinae. It was described by Jean Baptiste Boisduval in 1829. It is found in Cameroon, the Republic of the Congo and Nigeria.
