= Myopsyche xanthosoma =

Scientific classification
- Kingdom: Animalia
- Phylum: Arthropoda
- Class: Insecta
- Order: Lepidoptera
- Superfamily: Noctuoidea
- Family: Erebidae
- Subfamily: Arctiinae
- Genus: Myopsyche
- Species: M. xanthosoma

Binomial name
- Myopsyche xanthosoma Hampson, 1907

Species of moth

Myopsyche xanthosoma is a moth of the subfamily Arctiinae. It was described by George Hampson in 1907. It is found in Uganda.
