= Thermoniphas distincta =

Scientific classification
- Domain: Eukaryota
- Kingdom: Animalia
- Phylum: Arthropoda
- Class: Insecta
- Order: Lepidoptera
- Family: Lycaenidae
- Genus: Thermoniphas
- Species: T. distincta

Binomial name
- Thermoniphas distincta (Talbot, 1935)

Synonyms
- Everes micyclus distincta Talbot, 1935

Species of butterfly

Thermoniphas distincta is a butterfly in the family Lycaenidae. It is found in Uganda, Rwanda, Burundi, western Tanzania, the Democratic Republic of the Congo (Lualaba and Shaba) and northern Zambia. The habitat consists of stream banks.
