= Stictonaclia anastasia =

Scientific classification
- Domain: Eukaryota
- Kingdom: Animalia
- Phylum: Arthropoda
- Class: Insecta
- Order: Lepidoptera
- Superfamily: Noctuoidea
- Family: Erebidae
- Subfamily: Arctiinae
- Genus: Stictonaclia
- Species: S. anastasia

Binomial name
- Stictonaclia anastasia (Oberthür, 1893)

Synonyms
- Naclia anastasia Oberthür, 1893

Species of moth

Stictonaclia anastasia is a moth in the subfamily Arctiinae. It was described by Oberthür in 1893. It is found in Madagascar.
