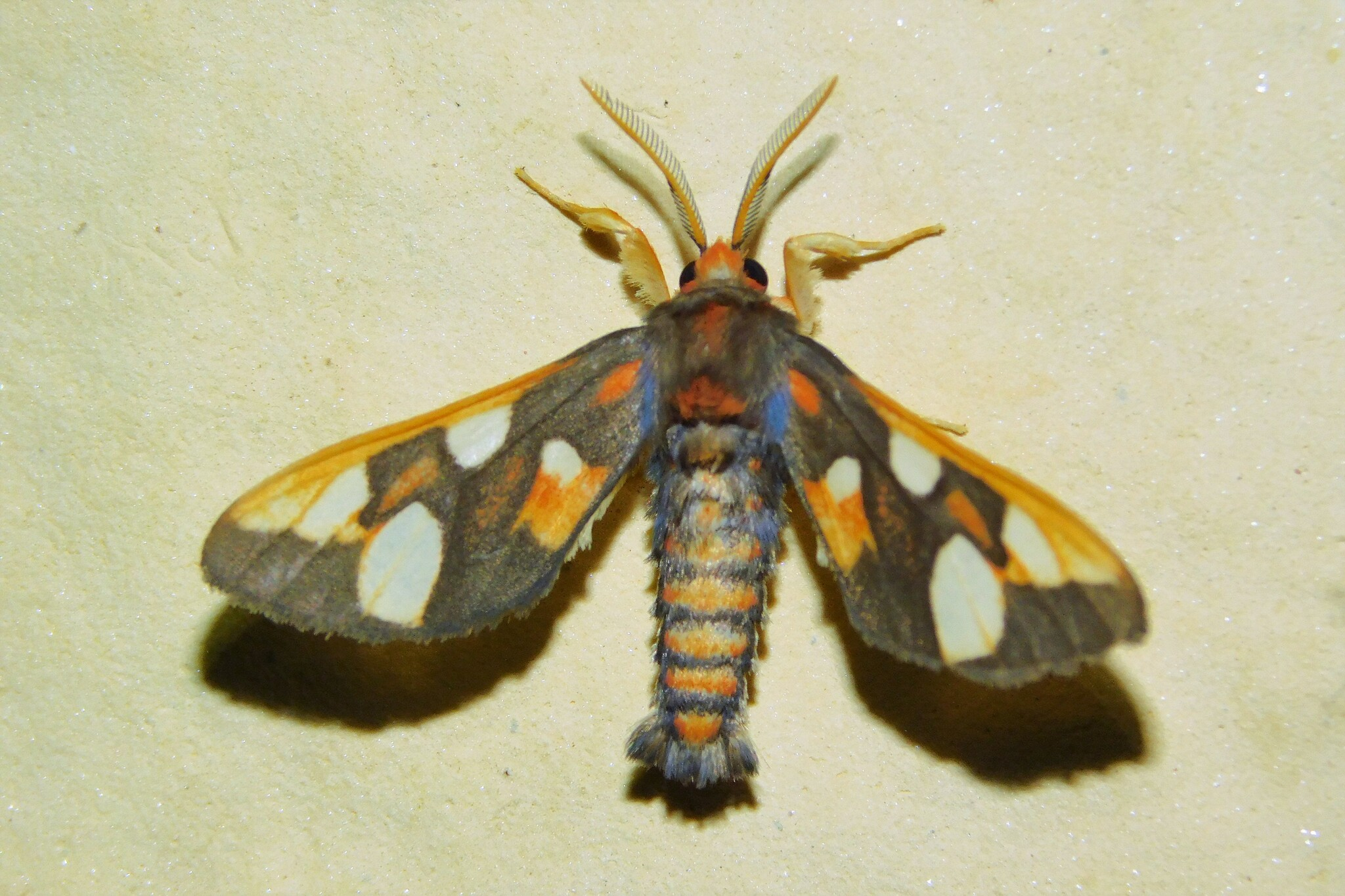
- Anapisa histrio

Scientific classification
- Kingdom: Animalia
- Phylum: Arthropoda
- Class: Insecta
- Order: Lepidoptera
- Superfamily: Noctuoidea
- Family: Erebidae
- Subfamily: Arctiinae
- Tribe: Syntomini
- Genus: Anapisa; Kiriakoff, 1952

= Anapisa =

Genus of moths

Anapisa is a genus of moths in the family Erebidae described by Sergius G. Kiriakoff in 1952.

== Species ==
- Anapisa cleta (Plötz, 1880)
- Anapisa connexa (Walker, 1854)
- Anapisa crenophylax (Holland, 1893)
- Anapisa dufranei Kiriakoff, 1952
- Anapisa endoxantha Hampson, 1914
- Anapisa histrio (Kiriakoff, 1953)
- Anapisa holobrunnea Tams, 1932
- Anapisa lamborni (Rothschild, 1913)
- Anapisa melaleuca Holland, 1898
- Anapisa metarctioides (Hampson, 1907)
- Anapisa monotica Holland, 1893
- Anapisa monotonia Kiriakoff, 1963
- Anapisa preussi Gaede, 1926
- Anapisa schoutedeni Kiriakoff, 1952
- Anapisa sjoestedti (Aurivillius, 1904)
- Anapisa tristigma (Mabille, 1893)
- Anapisa vanoyei Kiriakoff, 1952
