= Ceryx resecta =

Scientific classification
- Domain: Eukaryota
- Kingdom: Animalia
- Phylum: Arthropoda
- Class: Insecta
- Order: Lepidoptera
- Superfamily: Noctuoidea
- Family: Erebidae
- Subfamily: Arctiinae
- Genus: Ceryx
- Species: C. resecta

Binomial name
- Ceryx resecta (Herrich-Schäffer, 1855)

Synonyms
- Syntomis resecta Herrich-Schäffer, 1855

Species of moth

Ceryx resecta is a moth of the subfamily Arctiinae. It was described by Gottlieb August Wilhelm Herrich-Schäffer in 1855. It is found in South Africa.
