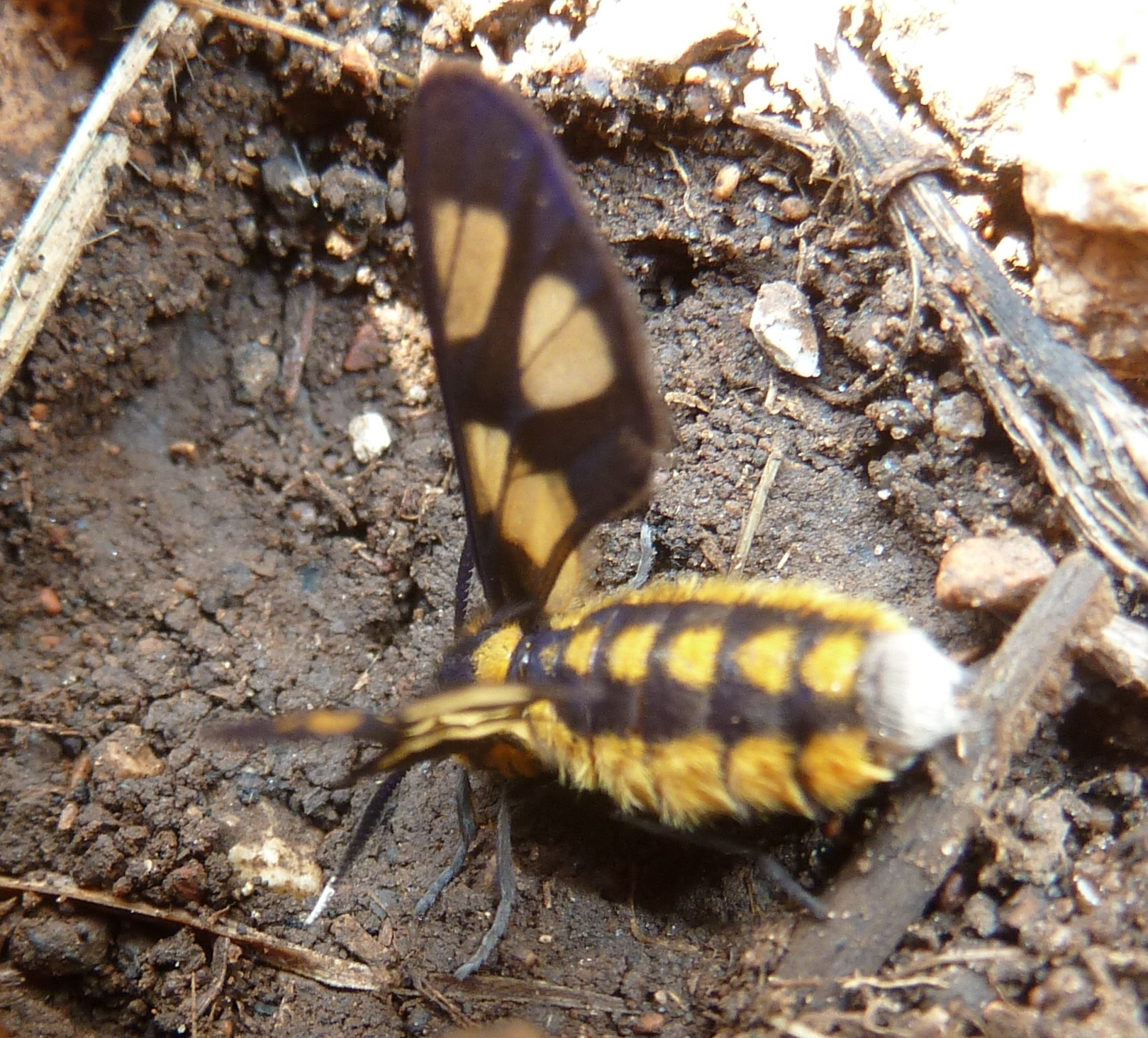
- Ceryx anthraciformis

Scientific classification
- Domain: Eukaryota
- Kingdom: Animalia
- Phylum: Arthropoda
- Class: Insecta
- Order: Lepidoptera
- Superfamily: Noctuoidea
- Family: Erebidae
- Subfamily: Arctiinae
- Tribe: Syntomini
- Genus: Ceryx; Wallengren, 1863

= Ceryx (moth) =

Genus of moths

Ceryx is a genus of moths in the family Erebidae. It was described by Hans Daniel Johan Wallengren in 1863.

The genus was circumscribed in 2022 such that it only contains Afro-tropical species; many former Ceryx species were transferred to the then-revalidated Agaphthora. These changes are not (yet) universally adopted and the list of species below does not reflect them.

== Species ==
- Ceryx aethalodes Wileman & West, 1928
- Ceryx affinis Rothschild, 1910
- Ceryx albimacula Walker, 1854
- Ceryx albipuncta Hampson, 1907
- Ceryx alenina Strand, 1912
- Ceryx ampla Walker, 1864
- Ceryx anthraciformis Wallengren, 1860
- Ceryx antiopa Kiriakoff, 1953
- Ceryx aroa Bethune-Baker, 1904
- Ceryx barombina Gaede, 1926
- Ceryx basilewsky Kiriakoff, 1955
- Ceryx bernhardi Seitz
- Ceryx burgeffi Obraztsov, 1949
- Ceryx calcuni Obraztsov, 1957
- Ceryx carpentieri Dufrane, 1936
- Ceryx chea Druce, 1895
- Ceryx cherra Moore, 1879
- Ceryx ciprianii Berio, 1937
- Ceryx claremontii Heylaerts, 1890
- Ceryx crawshayi Hampson, 1901
- Ceryx cybelistes Holland, 1893
- Ceryx diptera Fabricius, 1775
- Ceryx elasson Holland, 1893
- Ceryx evar Pagenstecher, 1886
- Ceryx flava Bethune-Baker, 1911
- Ceryx flavigutta Hulstaert, 1924
- Ceryx flaviplagia Hampson, 1898
- Ceryx formicina Swinhoe, 1892
- Ceryx fulvescens (Walker, 1854)
- Ceryx giloloensis Obraztsov, 1957
- Ceryx ginorea Swinhoe, 1894
- Ceryx guttulosa Walker, 1864
- Ceryx hageni Snellen, 1895
- Ceryx helodiaphana Roepke, 1937
- Ceryx hilda Ehrmann, 1894
- Ceryx homoeochroma Obraztsov, 1957
- Ceryx hyalina Moore, 1879
- Ceryx infranigra (Strand, 1912)
- Ceryx javanica Obraztsov, 1949
- Ceryx joltrandi Dufrane, 1936
- Ceryx keiensis Rothschild, 1910
- Ceryx kuehni Rothschild, 1910
- Ceryx lamottei Kiriakoff, 1963
- Ceryx longipes Herrich-Schäffer, 1855
- Ceryx macgregori Schultze, 1900
- Ceryx mirabilis Smetacek, 2010
- Ceryx morobeensis Obraztsov, 1957
- Ceryx nacliodes Hampson, 1914
- Ceryx pleurasticta Hampson, 1901
- Ceryx pleurostictoides Strand, 1915
- Ceryx pseudovigorsi Nieuwenhuis, 1946
- Ceryx puncta Druce, 1898
- Ceryx resecta Herrich-Schäffer, 1855
- Ceryx riouensis Obraztsov, 1957
- Ceryx salutator Kiriakoff, 1965
- Ceryx sambavana Hampson
- Ceryx semicincta Hampson, 1895
- Ceryx semihyalina Kirby, 1896
- Ceryx sphenodes Meyrick, 1886
- Ceryx sumatrensis Obraztsov, 1949
- Ceryx swinhoei Bethune-Baker, 1904
- Ceryx toxopeusi Obraztsov, 1957
- Ceryx toxotes Hampson, 1898
- Ceryx vespella Obraztsov, 1957
- Ceryx xuthosphendona Wileman & West, 1928
