= Anapisa lamborni =

Scientific classification
- Kingdom: Animalia
- Phylum: Arthropoda
- Class: Insecta
- Order: Lepidoptera
- Superfamily: Noctuoidea
- Family: Erebidae
- Subfamily: Arctiinae
- Genus: Anapisa
- Species: A. lamborni

Binomial name
- Anapisa lamborni (Rothschild, 1913)

Synonyms
- Apisa lamborni Rothschild, 1913

Species of moth

Anapisa lamborni is a moth of the family Erebidae. It was described by Rothschild in 1913. It is found in Nigeria.
