= Thermoniphas leucocyanea =

Scientific classification
- Domain: Eukaryota
- Kingdom: Animalia
- Phylum: Arthropoda
- Class: Insecta
- Order: Lepidoptera
- Family: Lycaenidae
- Genus: Thermoniphas
- Species: T. leucocyanea

Binomial name
- Thermoniphas leucocyanea Clench, 1961

Species of butterfly

Thermoniphas leucocyanea is a butterfly in the family Lycaenidae. It is found in Cameroon and Gabon.
