= Myopsyche fulvibasalis =

Scientific classification
- Kingdom: Animalia
- Phylum: Arthropoda
- Class: Insecta
- Order: Lepidoptera
- Superfamily: Noctuoidea
- Family: Erebidae
- Subfamily: Arctiinae
- Genus: Myopsyche
- Species: M. fulvibasalis

Binomial name
- Myopsyche fulvibasalis (Hampson, 1918)

Synonyms
- Amata fulvibasalis Hampson, 1918

Species of moth

Myopsyche fulvibasalis is a moth of the subfamily Arctiinae. It was described by George Hampson in 1918. It is found in Cameroon.
