= Ceryx antiopa =

Scientific classification
- Kingdom: Animalia
- Phylum: Arthropoda
- Class: Insecta
- Order: Lepidoptera
- Superfamily: Noctuoidea
- Family: Erebidae
- Subfamily: Arctiinae
- Genus: Ceryx
- Species: C. antiopa

Binomial name
- Ceryx antiopa Kiriakoff, 1953

Species of moth

Ceryx antiopa is a moth of the subfamily Arctiinae. It was described by Sergius G. Kiriakoff in 1953. It is found in the Democratic Republic of the Congo.
