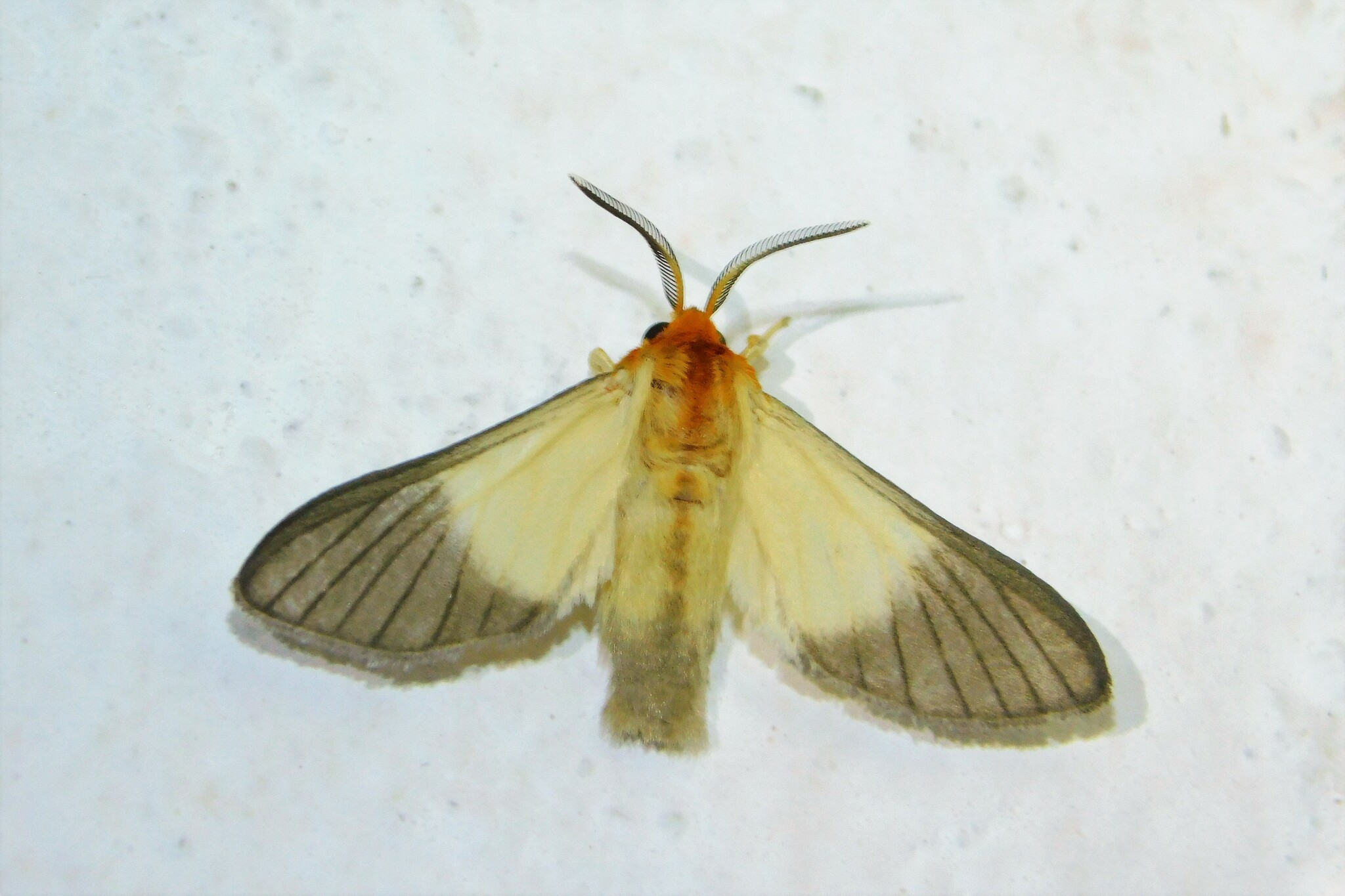

Scientific classification
- Kingdom: Animalia
- Phylum: Arthropoda
- Class: Insecta
- Order: Lepidoptera
- Superfamily: Noctuoidea
- Family: Erebidae
- Subfamily: Arctiinae
- Genus: Anapisa
- Species: A. melaleuca

Binomial name
- Anapisa melaleuca Holland, 1898

Synonyms
- Apisa albimacula Hampson, 1914; Apisa aurantiaca Rothschild, 1910; Syntomis chrysopyga Plötz, 1880; Syntomis kerri Holland, 1898; Syntomis leucogastra Holland, 1893; Anapisa mabira Strand, 1920; Anapisa mariae Dufrane, 1945; Metarctia palaemon Druce, 1911; Anace parachoria Holland, 1893; Anapisa melaleuca var. ruficilla Strand, 1912

= Anapisa melaleuca =

Species of moth

Anapisa melaleuca is a moth of the family Erebidae. It was described by William Jacob Holland in 1898. It is found in Cameroon, the Republic of the Congo, the Democratic Republic of the Congo, Gabon, Kenya and Uganda.
