= Ceryx albipuncta =

Scientific classification
- Kingdom: Animalia
- Phylum: Arthropoda
- Class: Insecta
- Order: Lepidoptera
- Superfamily: Noctuoidea
- Family: Erebidae
- Subfamily: Arctiinae
- Genus: Ceryx
- Species: C. albipuncta

Binomial name
- Ceryx albipuncta Hampson, 1907

Species of moth

Ceryx albipuncta is a moth of the subfamily Arctiinae. It was described by George Hampson in 1907. It is found on Luzon in the Philippines.
