= Ceryx alenina =

Scientific classification
- Kingdom: Animalia
- Phylum: Arthropoda
- Class: Insecta
- Order: Lepidoptera
- Superfamily: Noctuoidea
- Family: Erebidae
- Subfamily: Arctiinae
- Genus: Ceryx
- Species: C. alenina

Binomial name
- Ceryx alenina Strand, 1912

Species of moth

Ceryx alenina is a moth of the subfamily Arctiinae. It was described by Strand in 1912. It is found in Equatorial Guinea.
