= Myopsyche xanthopleura =

Scientific classification
- Kingdom: Animalia
- Phylum: Arthropoda
- Class: Insecta
- Order: Lepidoptera
- Superfamily: Noctuoidea
- Family: Erebidae
- Subfamily: Arctiinae
- Genus: Myopsyche
- Species: M. xanthopleura

Binomial name
- Myopsyche xanthopleura (Holland, 1898)

Synonyms
- Syntomoides xanthopleura Holland, 1898

Species of moth

Myopsyche xanthopleura is a moth of the subfamily Arctiinae. It was described by William Jacob Holland in 1898. It is found in Cameroon.
