= Ceryx macgregori =

Scientific classification
- Domain: Eukaryota
- Kingdom: Animalia
- Phylum: Arthropoda
- Class: Insecta
- Order: Lepidoptera
- Superfamily: Noctuoidea
- Family: Erebidae
- Subfamily: Arctiinae
- Genus: Ceryx
- Species: C. macgregori

Binomial name
- Ceryx macgregori Schultze, 1900

Species of moth

Ceryx macgregori is a moth of the subfamily Arctiinae. It was described by Schultze in 1900. It is found on the Philippines.
