= Ceryx semihyalina =

Scientific classification
- Domain: Eukaryota
- Kingdom: Animalia
- Phylum: Arthropoda
- Class: Insecta
- Order: Lepidoptera
- Superfamily: Noctuoidea
- Family: Erebidae
- Subfamily: Arctiinae
- Genus: Ceryx
- Species: C. semihyalina

Binomial name
- Ceryx semihyalina (Kirby, 1896)

Synonyms
- Zygaena semihyalina Kirby, 1896; Ceryx semihyalina var. macula Strand, 1912

Species of moth

Ceryx semihyalina is a moth of the subfamily Arctiinae. It was described by William Forsell Kirby in 1896. It is found in Equatorial Guinea, Ghana, Kenya and Uganda.
