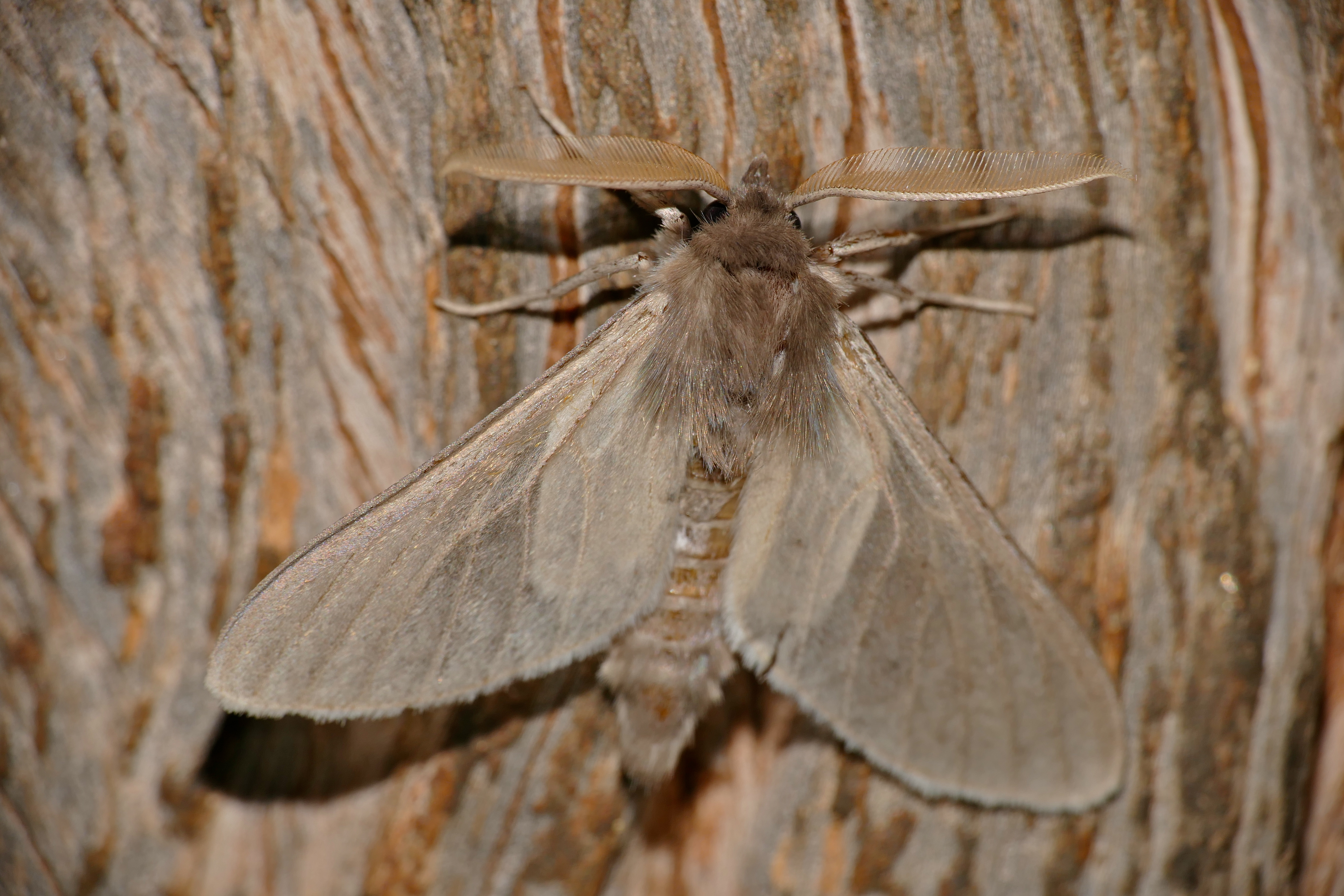

Scientific classification
- Kingdom: Animalia
- Phylum: Arthropoda
- Class: Insecta
- Order: Lepidoptera
- Superfamily: Noctuoidea
- Family: Erebidae
- Subfamily: Arctiinae
- Genus: Apisa
- Species: A. canescens

Binomial name
- Apisa canescens Walker, 1855

Synonyms
- Apisa cana Holland, 1893; Apisa homoeorotica Strand, 1917; Apisa microcanescens Berio, 1935; Psychotoe pallota Plötz, 1880; Apisa tamsi Kiriakoff, 1957

= Apisa canescens =

Species of moth

Apisa canescens is a moth of the family Erebidae. It was described by Francis Walker in 1855. It is found in the Republic of the Congo, the Democratic Republic of the Congo, Eritrea, Ethiopia, Gabon, Kenya, Namibia, Rwanda, Saudi Arabia, Sierra Leone, Somalia, South Africa and Tanzania.
