= Ceryx kuehni =

Scientific classification
- Domain: Eukaryota
- Kingdom: Animalia
- Phylum: Arthropoda
- Class: Insecta
- Order: Lepidoptera
- Superfamily: Noctuoidea
- Family: Erebidae
- Subfamily: Arctiinae
- Genus: Ceryx
- Species: C. kuehni

Binomial name
- Ceryx kuehni Rothschild, 1910

Species of moth

Ceryx kuehni is a moth of the subfamily Arctiinae. It was described by Walter Rothschild in 1910. It is found on Taam Island, west of Kai Islands in Indonesia.

The length of the forewings is about 12 mm. Adults are entirely black, the forewings with an enormous patch below the cell reaching to the outer margin. The hindwings are yellowish hyaline (glass like) with black margins.
