= Anapisa preussi =

Scientific classification
- Domain: Eukaryota
- Kingdom: Animalia
- Phylum: Arthropoda
- Class: Insecta
- Order: Lepidoptera
- Superfamily: Noctuoidea
- Family: Erebidae
- Subfamily: Arctiinae
- Genus: Anapisa
- Species: A. preussi

Binomial name
- Anapisa preussi (Gaede, 1926)

Synonyms
- Apisa preussi Gaede, 1926

Species of insect

Anapisa preussi is a moth of the family Erebidae. It was described by Max Gaede in 1926. It is found in Sierra Leone.
