= Ceryx homoeochroma =

Scientific classification
- Domain: Eukaryota
- Kingdom: Animalia
- Phylum: Arthropoda
- Class: Insecta
- Order: Lepidoptera
- Superfamily: Noctuoidea
- Family: Erebidae
- Subfamily: Arctiinae
- Genus: Ceryx
- Species: C. homoeochroma

Binomial name
- Ceryx homoeochroma Obraztsov, 1957

Species of moth

Ceryx homoeochroma is a moth of the subfamily Arctiinae. It was described by Obraztsov in 1957. It is found on Sumatra in Indonesia.
