= Thermoniphas fontainei =

Scientific classification
- Domain: Eukaryota
- Kingdom: Animalia
- Phylum: Arthropoda
- Class: Insecta
- Order: Lepidoptera
- Family: Lycaenidae
- Genus: Thermoniphas
- Species: T. fontainei

Binomial name
- Thermoniphas fontainei Stempffer, 1956

Species of butterfly

Thermoniphas fontainei is a butterfly in the family Lycaenidae. It is found in Gabon, the Republic of the Congo, the Democratic Republic of the Congo (Mayumbe, Kinshasa, Equateur, Ituri, Tshopo, Sankuru, Lomami and Lualaba), Tanzania and Zambia.
