= Ceryx xuthosphendona =

Scientific classification
- Domain: Eukaryota
- Kingdom: Animalia
- Phylum: Arthropoda
- Class: Insecta
- Order: Lepidoptera
- Superfamily: Noctuoidea
- Family: Erebidae
- Subfamily: Arctiinae
- Genus: Ceryx
- Species: C. xuthosphendona

Binomial name
- Ceryx xuthosphendona Wileman & West, 1928

Species of moth

Ceryx xuthosphendona is a moth of the subfamily Arctiinae. It was described by Wileman and West in 1928. It is found in the Philippines.
