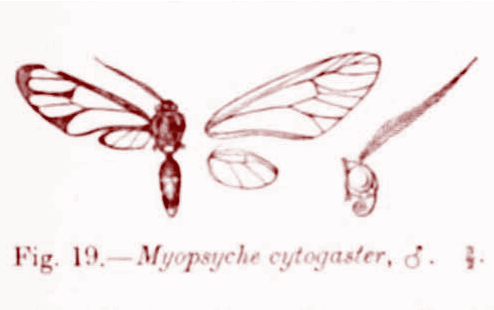
- Myopsyche cytogaster

Scientific classification
- Domain: Eukaryota
- Kingdom: Animalia
- Phylum: Arthropoda
- Class: Insecta
- Order: Lepidoptera
- Superfamily: Noctuoidea
- Family: Erebidae
- Subfamily: Arctiinae
- Genus: Myopsyche
- Species: M. cytogaster

Binomial name
- Myopsyche cytogaster (Holland, 1893)

Synonyms
- Syntomis cytogaster Holland, 1893

= Myopsyche cytogaster =

Species of moth

Myopsyche cytogaster is a moth of the subfamily Arctiinae. It was described by William Jacob Holland in 1893. It is found in Gabon.
