= Pseudothyretes erubescens =

Scientific classification
- Kingdom: Animalia
- Phylum: Arthropoda
- Class: Insecta
- Order: Lepidoptera
- Superfamily: Noctuoidea
- Family: Erebidae
- Subfamily: Arctiinae
- Genus: Pseudothyretes
- Species: P. erubescens

Binomial name
- Pseudothyretes erubescens (Hampson, 1901)

Synonyms
- Tritonaclia erubescens Hampson, 1901

Species of moth

Pseudothyretes erubescens is a moth in the subfamily Arctiinae. It was described by George Hampson in 1901. It is found in Kenya and Uganda.
