= Ceryx salutator =

Scientific classification
- Kingdom: Animalia
- Phylum: Arthropoda
- Class: Insecta
- Order: Lepidoptera
- Superfamily: Noctuoidea
- Family: Erebidae
- Subfamily: Arctiinae
- Genus: Ceryx
- Species: C. salutator

Binomial name
- Ceryx salutator Kiriakoff, 1965

Species of moth

Ceryx salutator is a moth of the subfamily Arctiinae. It was described by Sergius G. Kiriakoff in 1965. It is found in the Democratic Republic of the Congo.
