= Ceryx mirabilis =

Scientific classification
- Domain: Eukaryota
- Kingdom: Animalia
- Phylum: Arthropoda
- Class: Insecta
- Order: Lepidoptera
- Superfamily: Noctuoidea
- Family: Erebidae
- Subfamily: Arctiinae
- Genus: Ceryx
- Species: C. mirabilis

Binomial name
- Ceryx mirabilis Smetacek, 2010

Species of moth

Ceryx mirabilis is a moth of the subfamily Arctiinae. It was described by Peter Smetacek in 2010. It is found in India.

The length of the forewings is about 11 mm. The forewings and hindwings are hyaline (glass like).

== Etymology ==
The species name is derived from Latin mirabilis (meaning wonderful).
