= Ceryx hilda =

Scientific classification
- Domain: Eukaryota
- Kingdom: Animalia
- Phylum: Arthropoda
- Class: Insecta
- Order: Lepidoptera
- Superfamily: Noctuoidea
- Family: Erebidae
- Subfamily: Arctiinae
- Genus: Ceryx
- Species: C. hilda

Binomial name
- Ceryx hilda (Ehrmann, 1894)

Synonyms
- Syntomis hilda Ehrmann, 1894; Syntomoides seminigra Holland, 1898

Species of moth

Ceryx hilda is a moth of the subfamily Arctiinae. It was described by George A. Ehrmann in 1894. It is found in Cameroon, Liberia and Tanzania.
