= Thermoniphas kigezi =

Scientific classification
- Domain: Eukaryota
- Kingdom: Animalia
- Phylum: Arthropoda
- Class: Insecta
- Order: Lepidoptera
- Family: Lycaenidae
- Genus: Thermoniphas
- Species: T. kigezi

Binomial name
- Thermoniphas kigezi Stempffer, 1956

Species of butterfly

Thermoniphas kigezi is a butterfly in the family Lycaenidae. It is found in south-western Uganda and possibly Cameroon.
