= Anapisa sjostedti =

Scientific classification
- Kingdom: Animalia
- Phylum: Arthropoda
- Class: Insecta
- Order: Lepidoptera
- Superfamily: Noctuoidea
- Family: Erebidae
- Subfamily: Arctiinae
- Genus: Anapisa
- Species: A. sjostedti

Binomial name
- Anapisa sjostedti (Aurivillius, 1904)

Synonyms
- Apisa sjöstedti Aurivillius, 1904; Anapisa var. homopunctata Strand, 1912

Species of moth

Anapisa sjostedti is a moth of the family Erebidae. It was described by Per Olof Christopher Aurivillius in 1904. It is found in Cameroon and Ghana.
