= Anapisa connexa =

Scientific classification
- Kingdom: Animalia
- Phylum: Arthropoda
- Class: Insecta
- Order: Lepidoptera
- Superfamily: Noctuoidea
- Family: Erebidae
- Subfamily: Arctiinae
- Genus: Anapisa
- Species: A. connexa

Binomial name
- Anapisa connexa (Walker, 1854)

Synonyms
- Euchromia connexa Walker, 1854

Species of moth

Anapisa connexa is a moth of the family Erebidae. It was described by Francis Walker in 1854. It is found on Bioko, 32 km off the west coast of Africa.
