= Anapisa tristigma =

Scientific classification
- Domain: Eukaryota
- Kingdom: Animalia
- Phylum: Arthropoda
- Class: Insecta
- Order: Lepidoptera
- Superfamily: Noctuoidea
- Family: Erebidae
- Subfamily: Arctiinae
- Genus: Anapisa
- Species: A. tristigma

Binomial name
- Anapisa tristigma (Mabille, 1893)

Synonyms
- Naclia tristigma Mabille, 1893; Apisa tristigma

Species of moth

Anapisa tristigma is a moth of the family Erebidae. It was described by Paul Mabille in 1893. It is found in Sierra Leone.
