= Pseudothyretes perpusilla =

Scientific classification
- Kingdom: Animalia
- Phylum: Arthropoda
- Class: Insecta
- Order: Lepidoptera
- Superfamily: Noctuoidea
- Family: Erebidae
- Subfamily: Arctiinae
- Genus: Pseudothyretes
- Species: P. perpusilla

Binomial name
- Pseudothyretes perpusilla (Walker, 1856)

Synonyms
- Anace perpusilla Walker, 1856

Species of moth

Pseudothyretes perpusilla is a moth of the subfamily Arctiinae. It was described by Francis Walker in 1856. It is found in Angola, Cameroon, the Democratic Republic of the Congo, Gabon, Ghana, Ivory Coast, Kenya, Nigeria, Rwanda, Sierra Leone, Tanzania, the Gambia and Uganda.
