= Stictonaclia blandina =

Scientific classification
- Domain: Eukaryota
- Kingdom: Animalia
- Phylum: Arthropoda
- Class: Insecta
- Order: Lepidoptera
- Superfamily: Noctuoidea
- Family: Erebidae
- Subfamily: Arctiinae
- Genus: Stictonaclia
- Species: S. blandina

Binomial name
- Stictonaclia blandina (Oberthür, 1893)

Synonyms
- Naclia blandina Oberthür, 1893; Naclia alluaudi Oberthür, 1911

Species of moth

Stictonaclia blandina is a moth of the subfamily Arctiinae. It was described by Oberthür in 1893. It is found in Madagascar.
