= Pseudothyretes nigrita =

Scientific classification
- Kingdom: Animalia
- Phylum: Arthropoda
- Class: Insecta
- Order: Lepidoptera
- Superfamily: Noctuoidea
- Family: Erebidae
- Subfamily: Arctiinae
- Genus: Pseudothyretes
- Species: P. nigrita

Binomial name
- Pseudothyretes nigrita (Kiriakoff, 1961)

Synonyms
- Diakonoffia nigrita Kiriakoff, 1961

Species of moth

Pseudothyretes nigrita is a moth in the subfamily Arctiinae. It was described by Sergius G. Kiriakoff in 1961. It is found in the Democratic Republic of the Congo, Equatorial Guinea, Ghana and Kenya.
