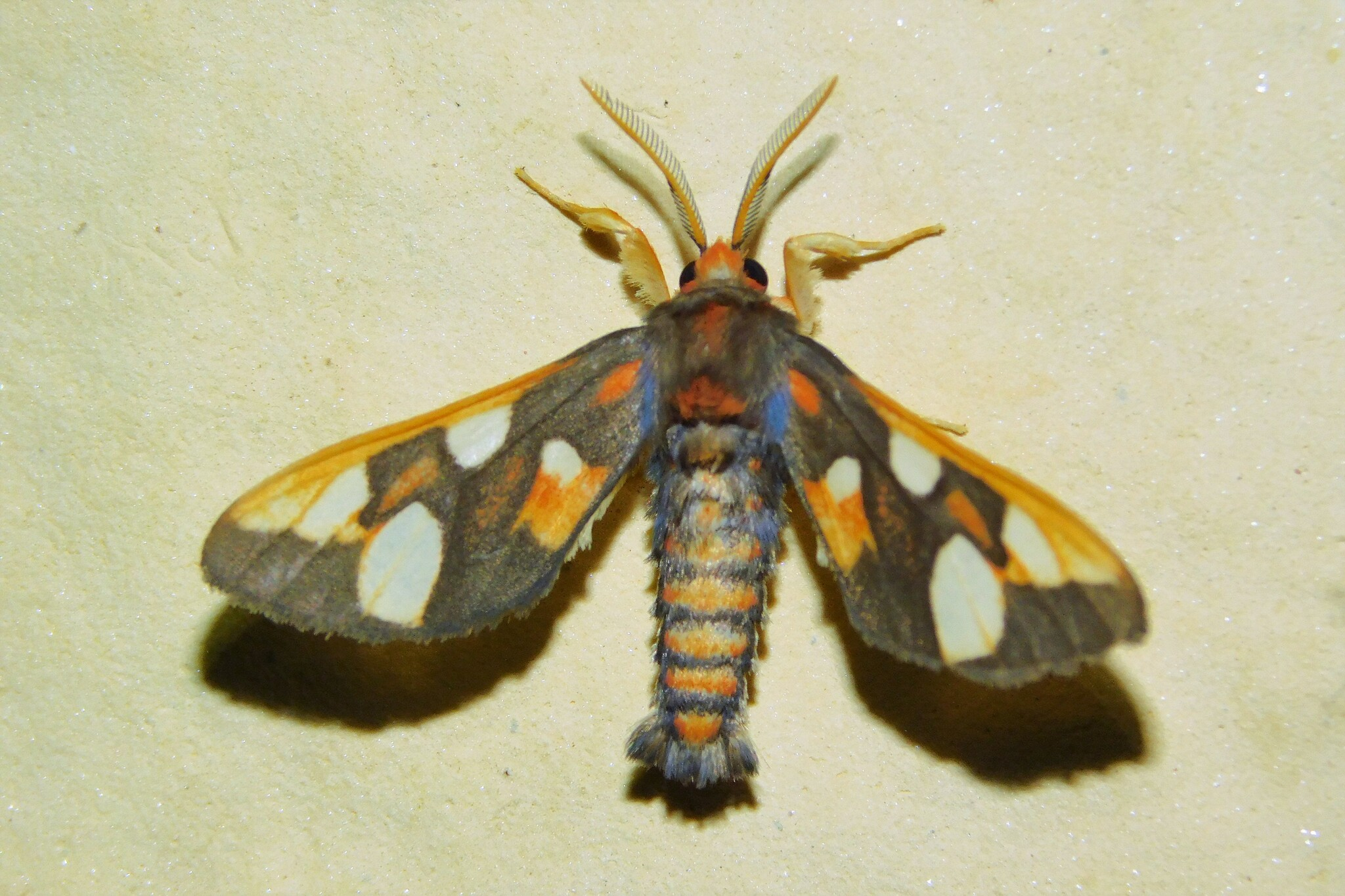

Scientific classification
- Kingdom: Animalia
- Phylum: Arthropoda
- Class: Insecta
- Order: Lepidoptera
- Superfamily: Noctuoidea
- Family: Erebidae
- Subfamily: Arctiinae
- Genus: Anapisa
- Species: A. histrio

Binomial name
- Anapisa histrio (Kiriakoff, 1953)

Synonyms
- Anapisa monotonia Kiriakoff, 1963

= Anapisa histrio =

Species of moth

Anapisa histrio is a moth of the family Erebidae. It was described by Sergius G. Kiriakoff in 1963. It is found in Angola, the Democratic Republic of the Congo and Kenya.
