= Pseudothyretes rubicundula =

Scientific classification
- Kingdom: Animalia
- Phylum: Arthropoda
- Class: Insecta
- Order: Lepidoptera
- Superfamily: Noctuoidea
- Family: Erebidae
- Subfamily: Arctiinae
- Genus: Pseudothyretes
- Species: P. rubicundula

Binomial name
- Pseudothyretes rubicundula (Strand, 1912)

Synonyms
- Metarctia rubicundula Strand, 1912; Apisa kivensis Dufrane, 1945

Species of moth

Pseudothyretes rubicundula is a moth of the subfamily Arctiinae. It was described by Strand in 1912. It is found in Angola, Cameroon, the Democratic Republic of Congo, Equatorial Guinea, Ghana, Guinea, Kenya and Uganda.
