= Pseudothyretes carnea =

Scientific classification
- Kingdom: Animalia
- Phylum: Arthropoda
- Class: Insecta
- Order: Lepidoptera
- Superfamily: Noctuoidea
- Family: Erebidae
- Subfamily: Arctiinae
- Genus: Pseudothyretes
- Species: P. carnea

Binomial name
- Pseudothyretes carnea (Hampson, 1898)

Synonyms
- Meganaclia carnea Hampson, 1898

Species of moth

Pseudothyretes carnea is a moth of the subfamily Arctiinae. It was described by George Hampson in 1898. It is found in Angola, the Democratic Republic of the Congo and Gabon.
