= Carl Plötz =

German entomologist (1814–1886)

Carl Plötz (1814 – 12 August 1886, Greifswald) was a German entomologist who specialised in Lepidoptera and in particular Hesperiidae. He was a member of the Entomological Society of Stettin. He wrote (from 1879 onwards)

- Verzeichniss der vom verstorbenen Prof. Dr. R. Buchholz in West-Afrika – Meerbusen van Guinea – gesammelten Hesperien Stettiner Entomologische Zeitung various dates; (1879)
- Verzeichniss der vom Professor Dr. R. Buchholz in West-Afrika – vom 5.Gr. nordl. Bis. 3.Gr. sudl, Breite, auf dem Cameroons-Gebirge in unge fahrer hohe von 4000 Fuss und auf der Insel Fernando-Po, vom August 1872 bis November 1875 – gesammelten Schmetterlinge. Stettiner Entomologische Zeitung 41: Heterocera text Rhopalocera text (1880)
- Die Hesperiinen-Gattung Goniurus Hüb. und ihre Arten. Bull. Soc. Imp. Nat. Moscou 55(3):1-22, (1880)
- Die Hesperiinen-Gattung Erycides Hübn. und ihre Arten. Stettin Ent. Ztg.; 40 (7-9): 406-411 (1881)
- Die Hesperiinen-Gattung Eudamus und ihre Arten. Stettiner entomologische Zeitung, Stettin, 42 : 500-504; 43 (1882, but published in 1881)
- Einige Hesperiinen-Gattungen und deren Arten. Berl. ent. Ztschr. 26:71-82, 253-266 (1882)
- Die Hesperiinen Gattung Apaustus Hbn. und ihre Arten. Stett. ent. Ztg. 45 (4-6): 151-166 (1884)
- System der Schmetterlinge. Mittheilungen aus dem naturwissentschaflichen Verein für Neu-Vorpommern und Rügen, Greifswald, 17: 485-528 (1886).
