= Abel Dufrane =

Belgian entomologist (1880–1960)

Abel Dufrane (8 May 1880, in Frameries – 29 December 1960, in Mons) was a Belgian entomologist who specialised in Lepidoptera.

Dufrane studied the butterfly fauna of the Lake Kivu area of Central Africa. He was a member of the Royal Belgian Entomological Society.

== Works ==
- Dufrane, A. (1929). Variation chez Papilio (S.S.) antimachus Drury. Lambillionea 29:138-139.
- ————— (1933). Quelques Rhopaloceres. Lambillionea 33:164-166.
- ————— (1936). Sur quelques espèces du genre Papilio. Lambillionea 36:40-42.
- ————— (1939). Lepidopteres du Kivu. Bulletin et Annales de la Société Royale Entomologique de Belgique 79:405-408.
- ————— (1940). Lepidopteres du Kivu (2e note) (1). Bulletin et Annales de la Société Royale Entomologique de Belgique 80:129-134.
- ————— (1945). Lepidopteres du Kivu (3e note) (1). Bulletin et Annales de la Société Royale Entomologique de Belgique 81:90-143.
- ————— (1946). Papilionidae. Bulletin et Annales de la Société Royale Entomologique de Belgique 82:101-122.
- ————— (1947). Pieridae. Bulletin et Annales de la Société Royale Entomologique de Belgique 83:46-73.
- ————— (1948). Lepidopteres du Kivu. Quatrieme Note (1). Bulletin et Annales de la Société Royale Entomologique de Belgique 84:160-168.
- ————— (1948). A propos de Danaus (Limnas Hbn) chrysippus L. (Lep. Danaidae). Miscellania Entomologica 45:49-51.
- ————— (1948). Note sur les Danaidae. Bulletin Mensuel de la Société Linneenne de Lyon 17:192-194.
- ————— (1948). Lepidopteres du Kivu (4e note). Bulletin et Annales de la Société Royale Entomologique de Belgique 84:160-168.
- ————— (1953). Lepidopteres du Kivu (5e note). Bulletin et Annales de la Société Royale Entomologique de Belgique 89:41-57.
- ————— (1954). A propos de Syntarucus pulchra Murray (Lep. Lyc.). Bulletin et Annales de la Société Royale Entomologique de Belgique 90:66-68.
- ————— (1954). Sur quelques Lycaenidae d’Afrique. Bulletin et Annales de la Société Royale Entomologique de Belgique 90:282-286.
