= List of moths of Mali =

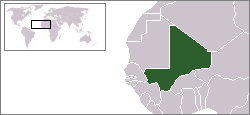
Location of Mali

Moths of Mali There are more than 400 species of moths known to occur in Mali. The moths (mostly nocturnal) and butterflies (mostly diurnal) together make up the taxonomic order Lepidoptera.

This is a partial list of moth species which have been recorded in Mali.

== Crambidae ==
- Analyta calligrammalis Mabille, 1879
- Ancylolomia simplella de Joannis, 1913
- Autocharis marginata Guillermet, 1996
- Botyodes asialis Guenée, 1854
- Botyodes diniasalis (Walker, 1859)
- Diaphania indica (Saunders, 1851)
- Euclasta warreni Distant, 1892
- Ghesquierellana hirtusalis (Walker, 1859)
- Glyphodes bitriangulalis Gaede, 1917
- Glyphodes negatalis (Walker, 1859)
- Haritalodes derogata (Fabricius, 1775)
- Herpetogramma basalis (Walker, 1866)
- Maruca vitrata (Fabricius, 1787)
- Palpita vitrealis (Rossi, 1794)
- Parapoynx fluctuosalis (Zeller, 1852)
- Pardomima callixantha Martin, 1955
- Parotis impia (Meyrick, 1934)
- Patania balteata (Fabricius, 1798)
- Pioneabathra olesialis (Walker, 1859)
- Pyrausta phoenicealis (Hübner, 1818)
- Sameodes cancellalis (Zeller, 1852)
- Spoladea recurvalis (Fabricius, 1775)
- Syllepte ovialis (Walker, 1859)
- Synclera traducalis (Zeller, 1852)
- Terastia africana Sourakov, 2015
- Ulopeza conigeralis Zeller, 1852
- Ulopeza flavicepsalis Hampson, 1912

== Erebidae ==
- Alpenus maculosa (Stoll, 1781)
- Amerila niveivitrea (Bartel, 1903)
- Hypena obacerralis Walker, [1859]
- Hypotacha isthmigera Wiltshire, 1968

== Geometridae ==
- Acidaliastis micra Hampson, 1896
- Lhommeia subapicata (Warren, 1899)
- Orbamia renimacula (Prout L. B., 1926)
- Pingasa rhadamaria (Guenée, 1858)
- Prasinocyma angolica Prout L. B., 1930
- Prasinocyma cisdahomica Hausmann, 2026
- Prasinocyma pedicata Fletcher D. S., 1956
- Scopula donovani (Distant, 1892)
- Traminda vividaria (Walker, 1861)
- Trimetopia ochsei Stadie & Fiebig, 2019
- Xenochroma palimpais Prout L. B., 1934
- Zamarada anacantha Fletcher D. S., 1974
- Zamarada nasuta Warren, 1897
- Zeuctoboarmia hyrax (Townsend, 1952)

== Lasiocampidae ==
- Beralade obliquata (Klug, 1830)
- Cleopatrina bilinea (Walker, 1855)
- Hapsimachogonia max Sulak et al., 2024
- Lasiocampa bilineata (Mabille, 1884)
- Leipoxais buttafuoco Müller et al., 2024
- Mimopacha rotundata Hering, 1941
- Pallastica lateritia (Hering, 1928)
- Streblote panda Hübner, 1822

== Lecithoceridae ==
- Torodora hybrista (Meyrick, 1922)

== Noctuidae ==
- Abrostola confusa Dufay, 1958
- Acontia buchanani (Rothschild, 1921)
- Acontia opalinoides Guenée, 1852
- Acontia semialba Hampson, 1910
- Emmelia basifera Walker, 1857
- Emmelia citrelinea Bethune-Baker, 1911
- Heliocheilus confertissima (Walker, 1865)
- Spodoptera exempta (Walker, 1857)

== Notodontidae ==
- Antheua atrata (Grünberg, 1907)
- Antheua cinerea Walker, 1855
- Antheua editae Schintlmeister & László, 2025
- Antheua extenuata Walker, 1869
- Antheua imitata hespera (Schintlmeister & László, 2025)
- Antheua interstincta Schintlmeister & László, 2025
- Antheua magnipuncta Schintlmeister & László, 2025
- Antheua tricolor anomala Berio, 1937
- Heinrichiana vuilleti (Joannis, 1907)
- Rigema amphiaraus Kiriakoff, 1955
- Rigema morettoi Schintlmeister & László, 2026
- Rigema orientalis strandi Schintlmeister & László, 2026
- Rigema vittata Walker, 1855

== Psychidae ==
- Acanthopsyche carbonarius Karsch, 1900

== Pterophoridae ==
- Hepalastis pumilio (Zeller, 1873)

== Pyralidae ==
- Biafra concinnella (Ragonot, 1888)
- Endotricha erythralis Mabille, 1900
- Epicrocis laticostella (Ragonot, 1888)
- Hypargyria metalliferella Ragonot, 1888
- Hypsopygia bamakoensis Leraut, 2006
- Hypsopygia mauritialis (Boisduval, 1833)
- Maliarpha separatella Ragonot, 1888
- Morosaphycita interniplagella (Ragonot, 1888)
- Pyralis farinalis Linnaeus, 1758
- Pyralis pictalis (Curtis, 1834)

== Scythrididae ==
- Scythris pelinaula Meyrick, 1916

== Thyrididae ==
- Rhodoneura sordidula (Plötz, 1880)

== Tineidae ==
- Cimitra fetialis (Meyrick, 1917)
- Criticonoma gypsocoma (Meyrick, 1931)
- Endromarmata lutipalpis (Meyrick, 1922)
- Hyperbola pastoralis (Meyrick, 1931)

== Tortricidae ==
- Cosmorrhyncha acrocosma (Meyrick, 1908)
- Cryptophlebia peltastica (Meyrick, 1921)
- Thaumatotibia leucotreta (Meyrick, 1913)

== See also ==
- List of butterflies of Mali
