= List of butterflies of Mali =

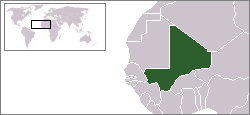
Location of Mali

This is a list of butterflies of Mali. About 59 species are known from Mali, none of which are endemic.

== Papilionidae ==
=== Papilioninae ===
==== Papilionini ====
- Papilio demodocus Esper, [1798]
- Papilio horribilis Butler, 1874

==== Leptocercini ====
- Graphium policenes (Cramer, 1775)
- Graphium angolanus baronis (Ungemach, 1932)
- Graphium leonidas (Fabricius, 1793)
- Graphium adamastor (Boisduval, 1836)

== Pieridae ==
=== Coliadinae ===
- Eurema brigitta (Stoll, [1780])
- Eurema hecabe solifera (Butler, 1875)
- Catopsilia florella (Fabricius, 1775)

=== Pierinae ===
- Colotis amata calais (Cramer, 1775)
- Colotis antevippe (Boisduval, 1836)
- Colotis aurora evarne (Klug, 1829)
- Colotis chrysonome (Klug, 1829)
- Colotis danae eupompe (Klug, 1829)
- Colotis evagore antigone (Boisduval, 1836)
- Colotis halimede (Klug, 1829)
- Colotis phisadia (Godart, 1819)
- Colotis vesta amelia (Lucas, 1852)
- Colotis eris (Klug, 1829)
- Pinacopterix eriphia tritogenia (Klug, 1829)

==== Pierini ====
- Mylothris chloris (Fabricius, 1775)
- Belenois aurota (Fabricius, 1793)

== Lycaenidae ==
=== Aphnaeinae ===
- Cigaritis buchanani (Rothschild, 1921)
- Cigaritis nilus (Hewitson, 1865)
- Axiocerses harpax harpax (Fabricius, 1775)
- Axiocerses harpax kadugli Talbot, 1935
- Axiocerses amanga borealis Aurivillius, 1905

=== Theclinae ===
- Hypolycaena philippus (Fabricius, 1793)
- Deudorix antalus (Hopffer, 1855)

=== Polyommatinae ===
==== Lycaenesthini ====
- Anthene lunulata (Trimen, 1894)

==== Polyommatini ====
- Lampides boeticus (Linnaeus, 1767)
- Tuxentius cretosus nodieri (Oberthür, 1883)
- Tarucus theophrastus (Fabricius, 1793)
- Zizeeria knysna (Trimen, 1862)
- Euchrysops malathana (Boisduval, 1833)
- Euchrysops sahelianus Libert, 2001
- Lepidochrysops polydialecta (Bethune-Baker, [1923])

== Nymphalidae ==
=== Danainae ===
==== Danaini ====
- Danaus chrysippus alcippus (Cramer, 1777)

=== Satyrinae ===
==== Melanitini ====
- Melanitis leda (Linnaeus, 1758)
- Melanitis libya Distant, 1882

==== Satyrini ====
- Bicyclus milyas (Hewitson, 1864)
- Bicyclus pavonis (Butler, 1876)
- Bicyclus vulgaris (Butler, 1868)
- Ypthima condamini nigeriae Kielland, 1982

=== Charaxinae ===
==== Charaxini ====
- Charaxes jasius Poulton, 1926
- Charaxes epijasius Reiche, 1850

=== Nymphalinae ===
==== Nymphalini ====
- Junonia chorimene (Guérin-Méneville, 1844)
- Junonia hierta cebrene Trimen, 1870
- Junonia oenone (Linnaeus, 1758)
- Junonia orithya madagascariensis Guenée, 1865
- Hypolimnas misippus (Linnaeus, 1764)

=== Limenitinae ===
==== Adoliadini ====
- Hamanumida daedalus (Fabricius, 1775)

=== Heliconiinae ===
==== Acraeini ====
- Acraea neobule Doubleday, 1847
- Acraea caecilia (Fabricius, 1781)
- Acraea serena (Fabricius, 1775)

== Hesperiidae ==
=== Coeliadinae ===
- Coeliades aeschylus (Plötz, 1884)
- Coeliades forestan (Stoll, [1782])

=== Pyrginae ===
==== Celaenorrhinini ====
- Sarangesa laelius (Mabille, 1877)

==== Carcharodini ====
- Spialia spio (Linnaeus, 1764)

=== Hesperiinae ===
==== Baorini ====
- Gegenes hottentota (Latreille, 1824)

== See also ==
- Geography of Mali
- Wildlife of Mali
- South Saharan steppe and woodlands
- West Saharan montane xeric woodlands
- List of moths of Mali
