= Cape laurel =

Cape laurel is a common name for several plants native to Southern Africa and may refer to:

- Cryptocarya woodii
- Ocotea bullata
