= Emperor swallowtail =

Emperor swallowtail is the common name of two species of butterflies in the genus Papilio:

- Papilio hesperus, endemic to tropical Africa
- Papilio ophidicephalus, endemic to tropical Africa, parts of the East African coast, and the Cape region
