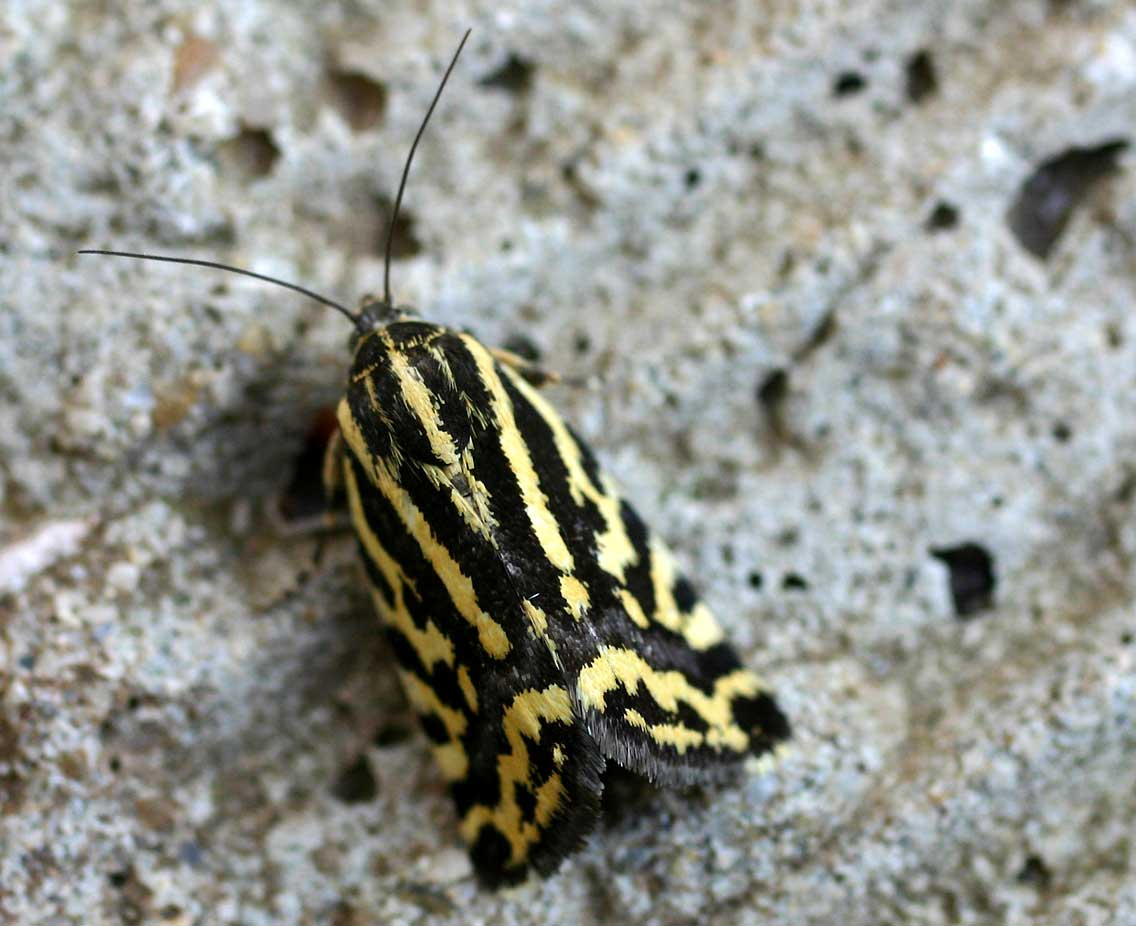

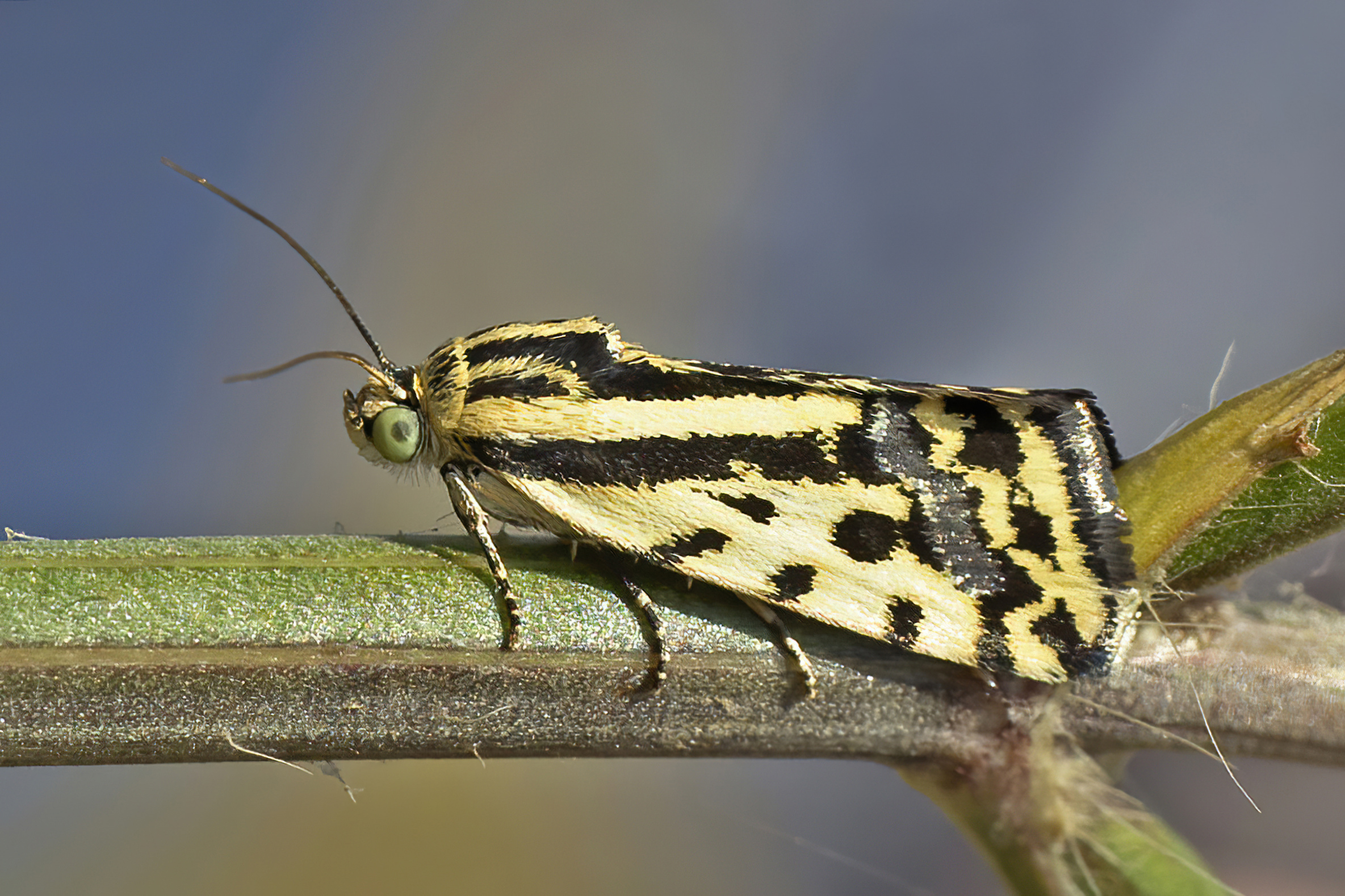

Scientific classification
- Domain: Eukaryota
- Kingdom: Animalia
- Phylum: Arthropoda
- Class: Insecta
- Order: Lepidoptera
- Superfamily: Noctuoidea
- Family: Noctuidae
- Genus: Emmelia
- Species: E. trabealis

Binomial name
- Emmelia trabealis (Scopoli, 1763)

Synonyms
- List: Phalaena trabealis Scopoli, 1763; Acontia trabealis Scopoli, 1763; Phalaena arabica Hufnagel, 1766; Phalaena Pyralis sulphuralis Linnaeus, 1767; Noctua sulphurea [Schiffermüller], 1775; Tinea arlequinetta Geoffroy, 1785; Phalaena Noctua trabeata Borkhausen, 1790; Bombyx lugubris Fabricius, 1793; Erastria pardalina Walker, 1865

= Emmelia trabealis =

Species of moth

Emmelia trabealis, the spotted sulphur, is a moth of the family Noctuidae. The species was first described by Giovanni Antonio Scopoli his 1763 Entomologia Carniolica.

== Taxonomy ==
The species is sometimes placed in the genus Acontia and Emmelia is considered as a subgenus of Acontia.

== Distribution ==
The spotted sulphur can be found in most of the Palearctic (Europe, North Africa, the Middle East and Russia to northern China and Japan). It was formerly resident in Great Britain, but has not been seen at any known breeding colonies since 25 June 1960 and is presumed extinct there.

== Habitat ==
This species prefers sandy soil, dry and warm areas, meadows and sunny slopes on which the bindweed occurs.

== Description ==
The wingspan of Emmelia trabealis can reach 18–24 mm. The forewings show a very variable black drawings on a yellowish or dirty white background. The rear wings are reddish brown.

Eggs are green, elongated and cone shaped, with a flattened base and distinct longitudinal ribs. Caterpillars are reddish to greenish brown, with dark dorsal lines and a yellow side band, the head is relatively small and brown. Cocoons are red brown or green.

== Technical description and variation ==
E. trabealis Scop. (= sulphuralis L., arabica Hufn., sulphurea Schiff., trabeata Scriba, lugubris F., pardalina Walk.) (52 g). Forewing pale yellow; the markings black, edged, when fresh, with lustrous scales;horizontal black streaks from base along median and submedian veins; the lines marked by black costal spots, the outer and subterminal more or less complete, sometimes interrupted; two black spots represent the stigmata; fringe yellow marked with black in middle and at each end; hindwing reddish fuscous; the fringe yellowish white. The insect varies according to the preponderance of the yellow or black scaling; as a rule, the yellow prevails in the female, the black in the male; — the ab. nigra Ersch. (52 g), from W. Turkestan, is almost wholly black. Larva green changing to brownish; dorsal and subdorsal lines darker, with faintly paler edges; spiracular line broadly pale yellow.

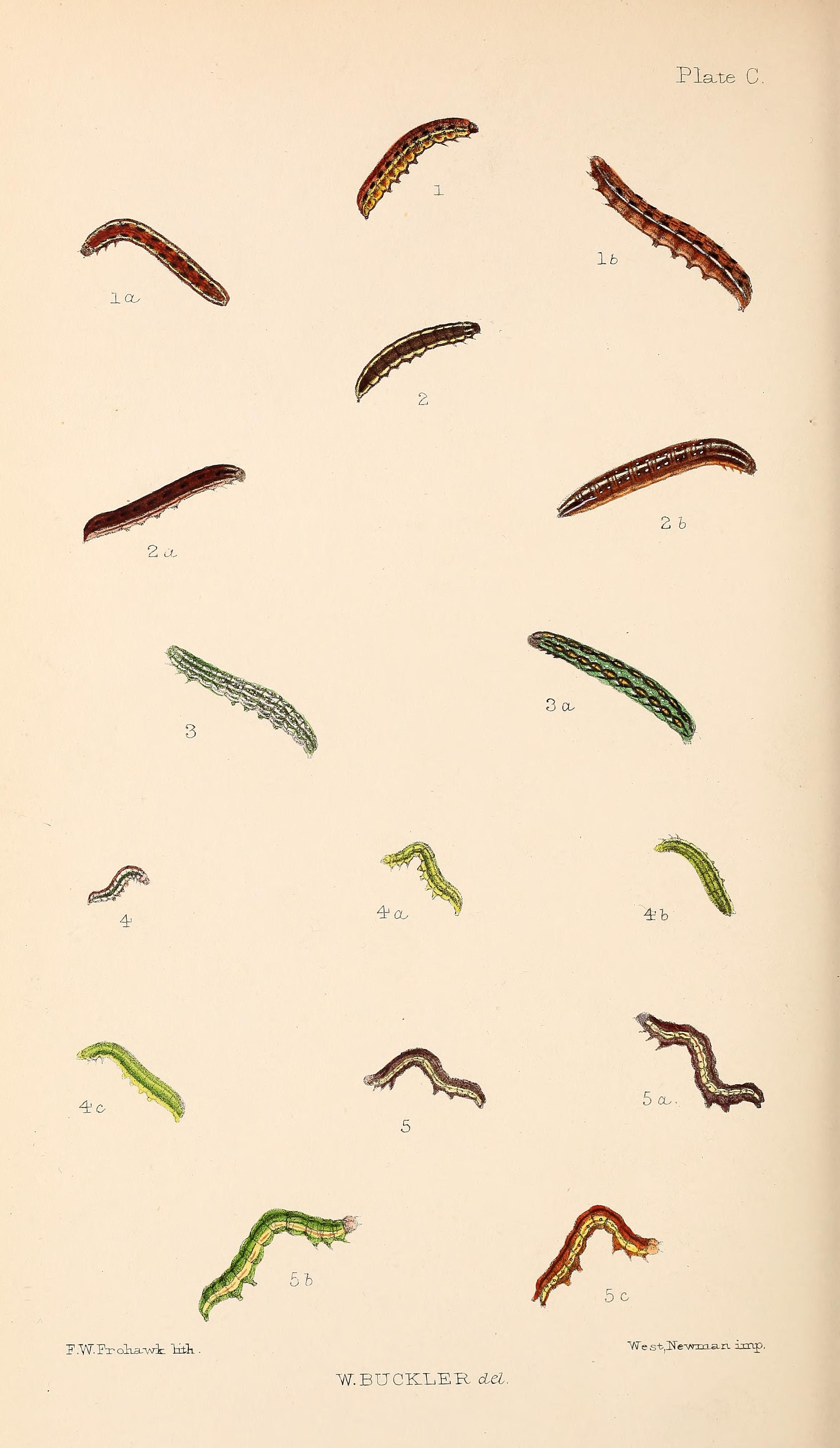
5, 5a, 5b, 5c larvae in various stages of growth

== Biology ==
This species presents two overlapping generations a year, the second generation is generally missing in cool years. The moth flies from May to August depending on the location and then again from August to early September. The pupa overwinters. The larvae feed on field bindweed (Convolvulus arvensis) and Polygonum species. The imago takes short jerky flights in the sunshine close to the ground and is difficult of observation; it frequents dry and sandy localities.

== Gallery ==
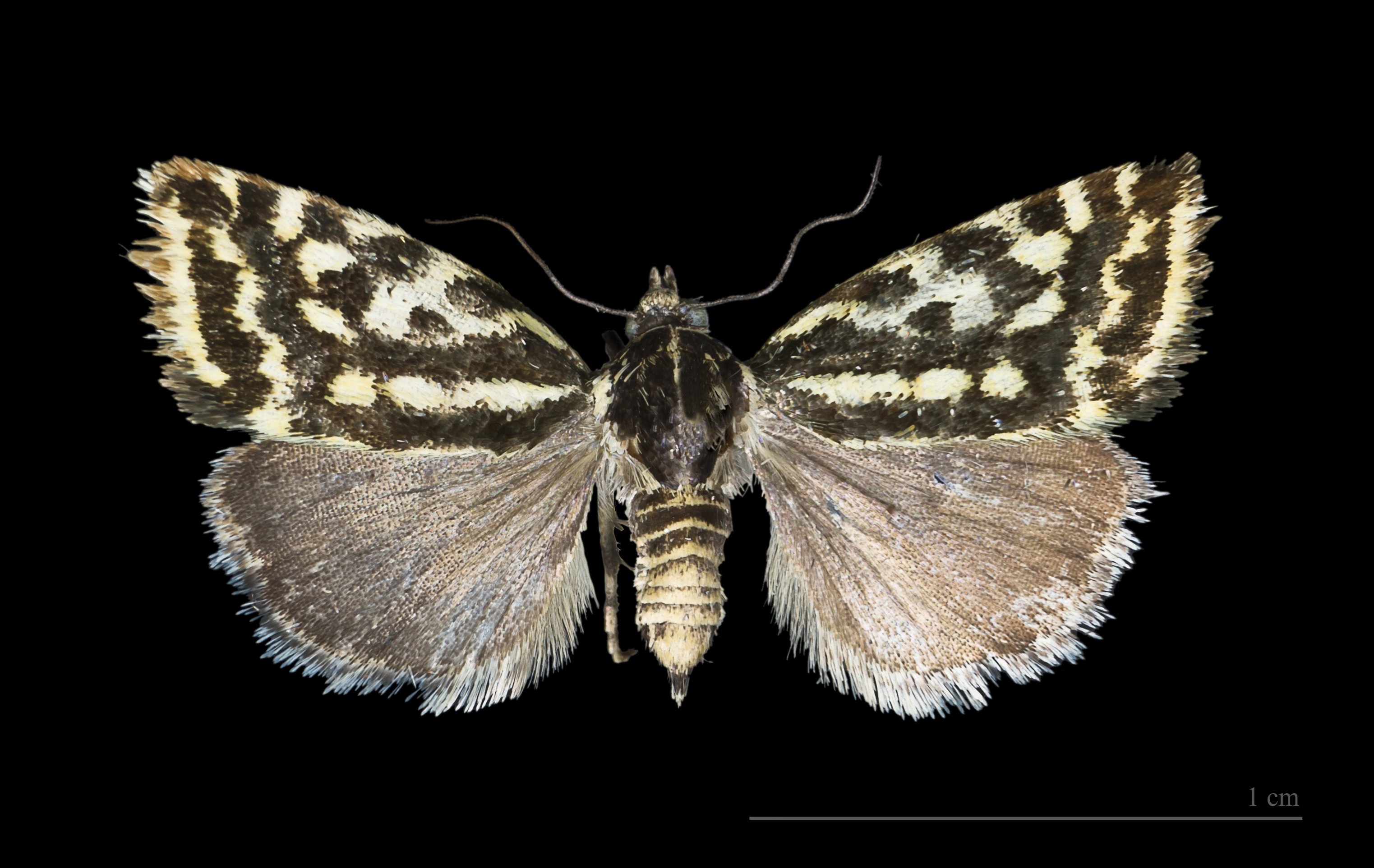
Male - dorsal side

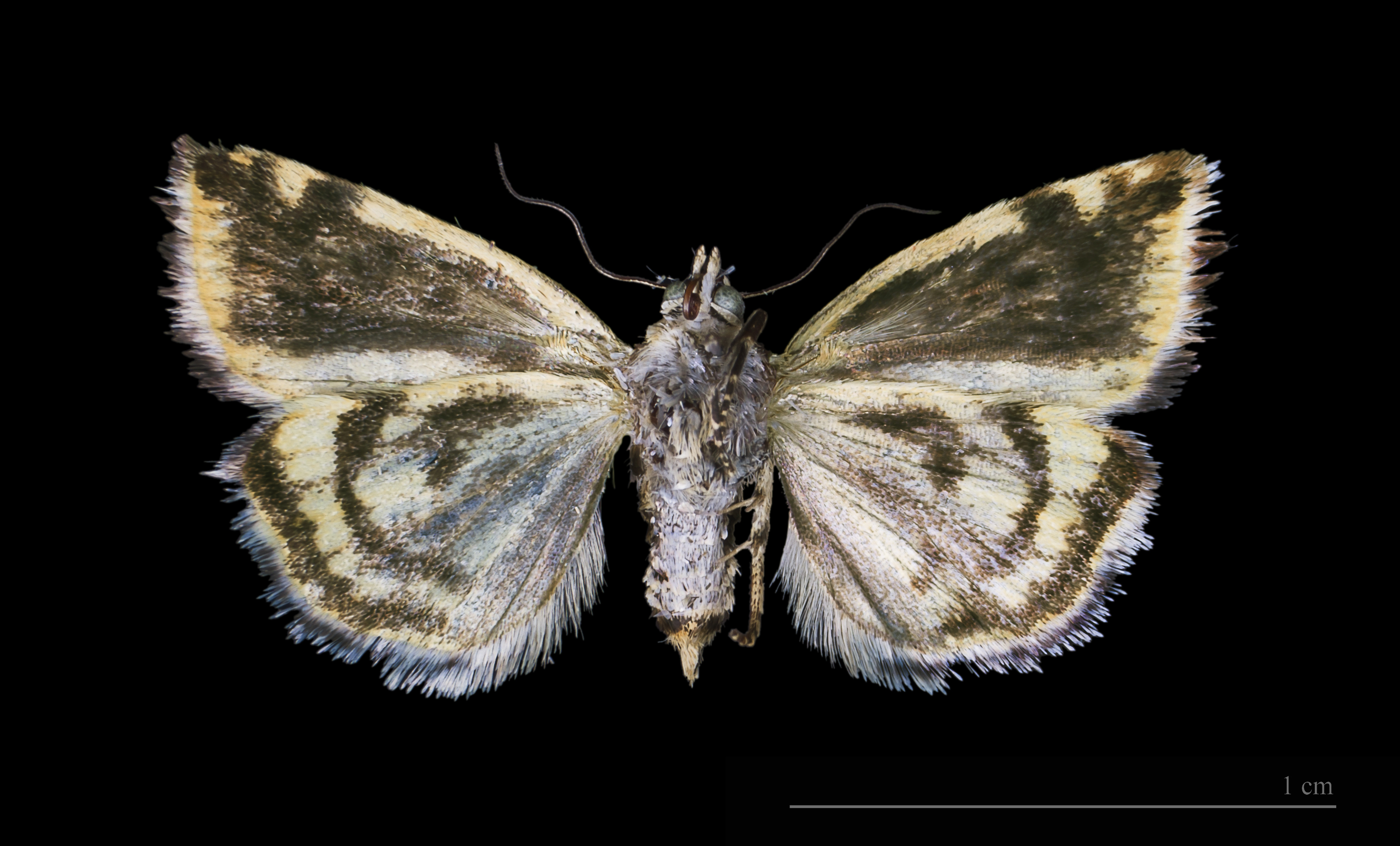
Male - ventral side

== Bibliography ==
- Arno Bergmann: Die Großschmetterlinge Mitteldeutschlands. Band 4/2, Eulen. Urania-Verlag, Jena 1954.
- Borkhausen, 1790, Naturgeschichte der Europäischen Schmetterlinge nach systematrischer Ordnung 3. Der Phalaenen erste Horden, die Spinner: pl. 10, fig. 8. TL: Europe.
- Denis & Schiffermüller, 1775, Ankündung eines systematischen Werkes von den Schmetterlingen der Wienergegend: 93. Unjustified emendation of Phalaena trabealis Scopoli, 1763.
- Fabricius, 1793, Entomologia Systematica, Emendata et Aucta 3 (1): 467. TL: Europe.
- Günter Ebert (Hrsg.): Die Schmetterlinge Baden-Württembergs. Band 5, Nachtfalter III (Sesiidae, Arctiidae, Noctuidae). Ulmer Verlag, Stuttgart 1997. ISBN 3-800-13481-0.
- Manfred Koch: Wir bestimmen Schmetterlinge: III Eulen Deutschlands. Neumann Verlag, Radebeul & Berlin 1958.
- Scopoli, 1763, Entomologica Carniolica Exhibens Insecta Carnioliae Indigena et Distributa in Ordines, Genera, Species, Varietas Methodo Linnaeana : 240
- Walker, 1865, List. Spec. Lep. Ins. Colln. Br. Mus. 33: 794. TL: Mauritius. HT: BMNH. male.

Walter Forster & Theodor A. Wohlfahrt: Die Schmetterlinge Mitteleuropas. Bd. IV, Eulen (Noctuidae). Franckh’sche Verlagsbuchhandlung, Stuttgart 1971, ISBN 3-440-03752-5.
