= Emmelia nephele =

Scientific classification
- Kingdom: Animalia
- Phylum: Arthropoda
- Clade: Pancrustacea
- Class: Insecta
- Order: Lepidoptera
- Superfamily: Noctuoidea
- Family: Noctuidae
- Genus: Emmelia
- Species: E. nephele

Binomial name
- Emmelia nephele Hampson, 1911

Species of moth

Emmelia nephele is a species of moth in the family Noctuidae. It was described by George Hampson in 1911. This species is found in central and southern Africa.
