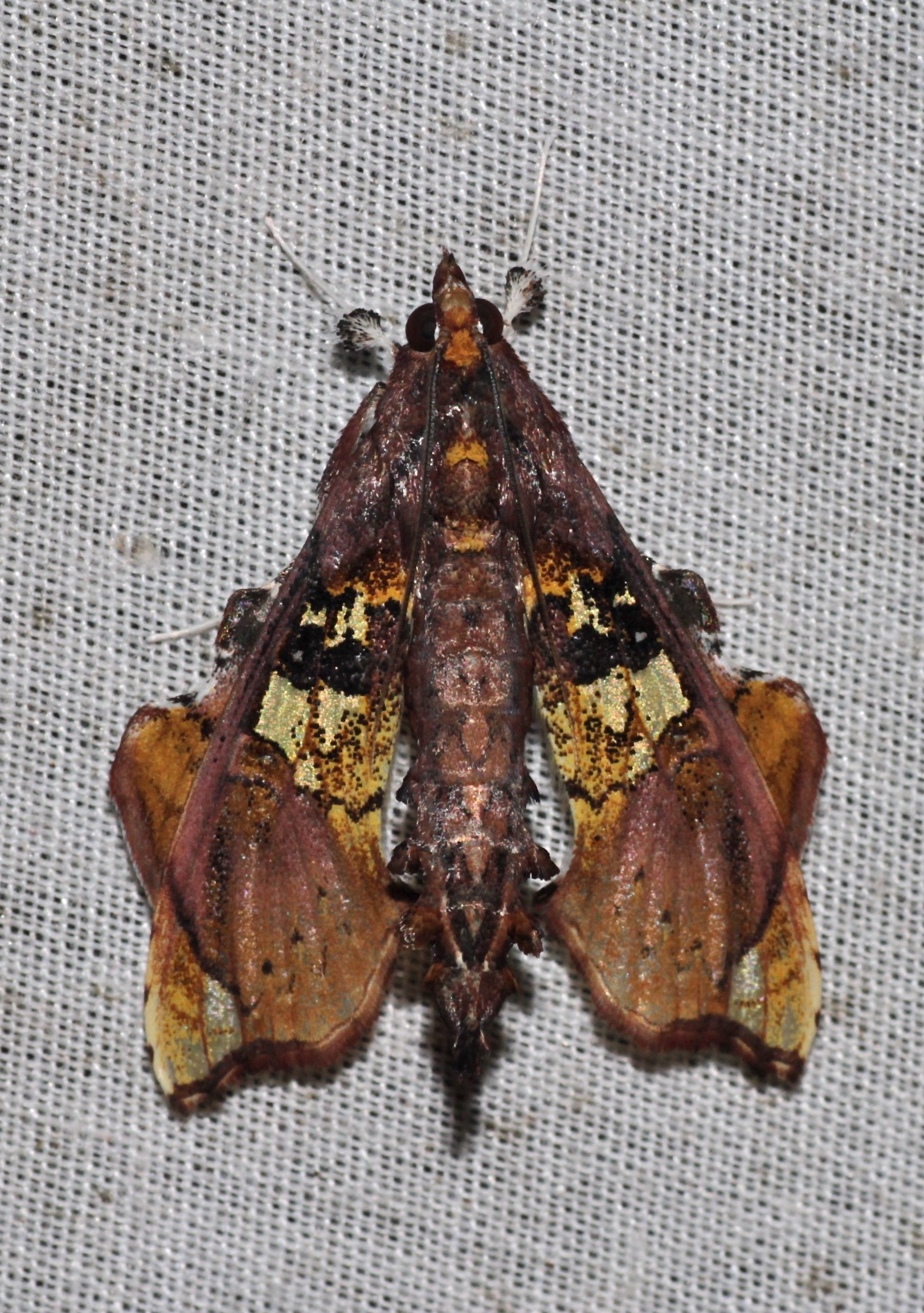
- Terastia egialealis adult

Scientific classification
- Kingdom: Animalia
- Phylum: Arthropoda
- Clade: Pancrustacea
- Class: Insecta
- Order: Lepidoptera
- Family: Crambidae
- Tribe: Margaroniini
- Genus: Terastia; Guenée, 1854

Synonyms
- Tersatia Lederer, 1863 (misspelling)

= Terastia =

Genus of moths

Terastia is a genus of snout moths in the subfamily Spilomelinae of the family Crambidae. It was described by Achille Guenée in 1854 with Terastia meticulosalis as type species. The genus is currently placed in the tribe Margaroniini, where it is closely related to the genera Agathodes and Liopasia.

Terastia with its eight species is distributed in the tropical regions of the Neotropical, Afrotropical and Oriental realm as well as Australasia.

Like the closely related genera Agathodes and Liopasia, the caterpillars of Terastia species feed on Erythrina species (Fabaceae).

== Species ==
- Terastia africana Sourakov in Sourakov, Plotkin, Kawahara, Xiao, Hallwachs & Janzen, 2015
- Terastia diversalis (Walker, 1866)
- Terastia egialealis (Walker, 1859)
- Terastia margaritis (C. Felder, R. Felder & Rogenhofer, 1875)
- Terastia meticulosalis Guenée, 1854
- Terastia minor Koningsberger & Zimmermann, 1901
- Terastia proceralis Lederer, 1863
- Terastia subjectalis Lederer, 1863
