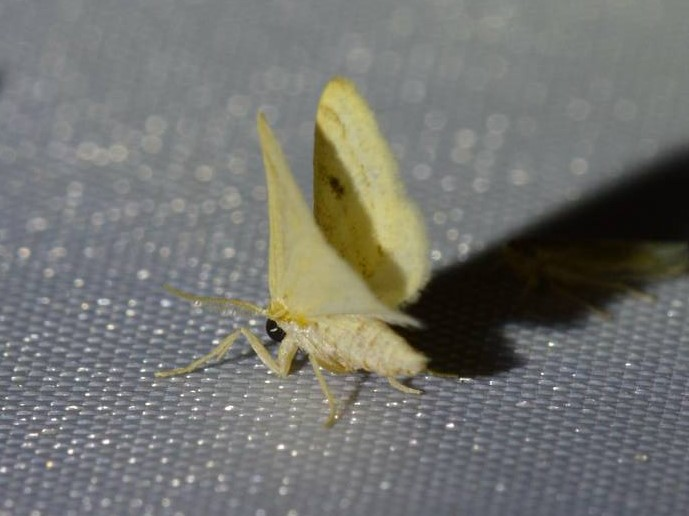
- Acidaliastis micra

Scientific classification
- Kingdom: Animalia
- Phylum: Arthropoda
- Class: Insecta
- Order: Lepidoptera
- Family: Geometridae
- Tribe: Microloxiini
- Genus: Acidaliastis; Hampson, 1896

Synonyms
- Mixeophanes Prout, 1912

= Acidaliastis =

Genus of geometer moths

Acidaliastis is a genus of moths in the family Geometridae erected by George Hampson in 1896.

== Species ==
- Acidaliastis bicurvifera Prout, 1916
- Acidaliastis curvilinea Prout, 1912
  - Acidaliastis curvilinea ssp. mixta Prout, 1930
- Acidaliastis micra Hampson, 1896
  - Acidaliastis micra ssp. galactea Rungs, 1942
- Acidaliastis porphyretica Prout, 1925
- Acidaliastis prophanes Prout, 1922
- Acidaliastis subbrunnescens Prout, 1916
- Acidaliastis systena Fletcher, 1978
