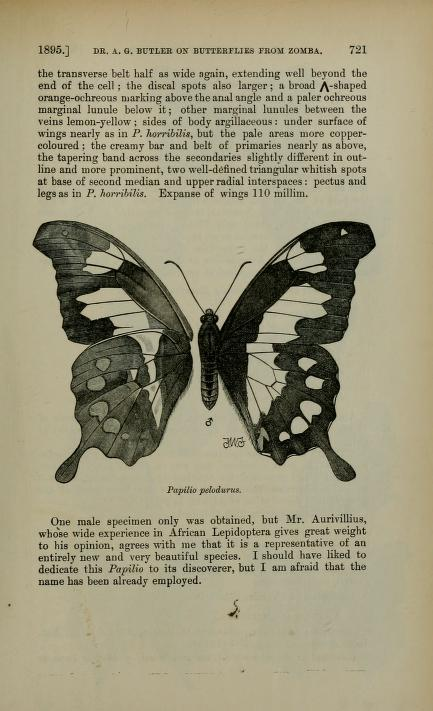
- Illustration in Butler's original description in Proceedings of the Zoological Society of London

Scientific classification
- Kingdom: Animalia
- Phylum: Arthropoda
- Clade: Pancrustacea
- Class: Insecta
- Order: Lepidoptera
- Family: Papilionidae
- Genus: Papilio
- Species: P. pelodurus

Binomial name
- Papilio pelodurus Butler, 1896

Synonyms
- Papilio pelodurus pelodurus f.indiv. lyrus Le Cerf, 1924; Papilio pelodurus pelodurus f.indiv. extensus Le Cerf, 1924; Papilio pelodurus ab. histricus Boullet & Le Cerf, 1912; Papilio pelodurus vesper f.indiv. excedens Le Cerf, 1924

= Papilio pelodurus =

Species of butterfly

Papilio pelodurus is a species of swallowtail butterfly from the genus Papilio that is found in Malawi, Tanzania and Zambia.

The larvae feed on Cryptocarya liebertiana and Ocotea usambarensis.

== Taxonomy ==
Papilio pelodurus is a member of the hesperus species-group. The members of the clade are

- Papilio hesperus Westwood, 1843
- Papilio euphranor Trimen, 1868
- Papilio horribilis Butler, 1874
- Papilio pelodurus Butler, 1896

== Subspecies ==
- Papilio pelodurus pelodurus (highland forest of Malawi)
- Papilio pelodurus vesper Le Cerf, 1924 (eastern and southern Tanzania, north-eastern Zambia, northern Malawi)
