= Emmelia conifrons =

Scientific classification
- Kingdom: Animalia
- Phylum: Arthropoda
- Clade: Pancrustacea
- Class: Insecta
- Order: Lepidoptera
- Superfamily: Noctuoidea
- Family: Noctuidae
- Genus: Emmelia
- Species: E. conifrons

Binomial name
- Emmelia conifrons Aurivillius, 1879

Species of moth

Emmelia conifrons is a species of moth in the family Noctuidae. It was described by Per Olof Christopher Aurivillius in 1879. This species can be found in southern Africa and Madagascar.
