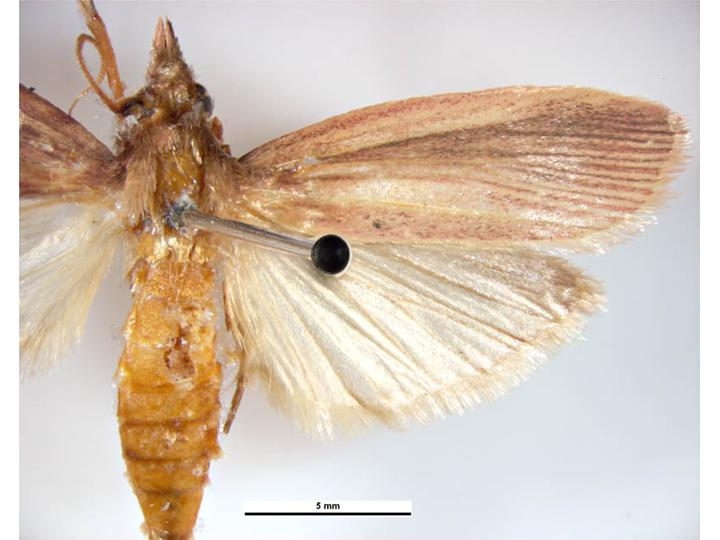
- Maliarpha separatella

Scientific classification
- Domain: Eukaryota
- Kingdom: Animalia
- Phylum: Arthropoda
- Class: Insecta
- Order: Lepidoptera
- Family: Pyralidae
- Tribe: Anerastiini
- Genus: Maliarpha; Ragonot, 1888

Synonyms
- Ampycodes Hampson in Ragonot, 1901; Biafra Ragonot, 1888; Ethiotropa Hampson, 1918

= Maliarpha (moth) =

Genus of moths

Maliarpha is a genus of moths of the family Pyralidae.

== Species ==
- Maliarpha brunnella Cook, 1997
- Maliarpha concinnella (Ragonot, 1888)
- Maliarpha fuscicostella Cook, 1997
- Maliarpha longisignumella Cook, 1997
- Maliarpha rosella Hampson, 1896
- Maliarpha separatella Ragonot, 1888
- Maliarpha validella Zerny in Rebel & Zerny, 1917
