= Terastia proceralis =

Scientific classification
- Kingdom: Animalia
- Phylum: Arthropoda
- Class: Insecta
- Order: Lepidoptera
- Family: Crambidae
- Genus: Terastia
- Species: T. proceralis

Binomial name
- Terastia proceralis Lederer, 1863

Species of moth

Terastia proceralis is a moth in the family Crambidae. It was described by Julius Lederer in 1863. It is found in India.
