= Zeuctoboarmia =

Scientific classification
- Kingdom: Animalia
- Phylum: Arthropoda
- Clade: Pancrustacea
- Class: Insecta
- Order: Lepidoptera
- Family: Geometridae
- Genus: Zeuctoboarmia; L. B. Prout, 1915

Genus of moths

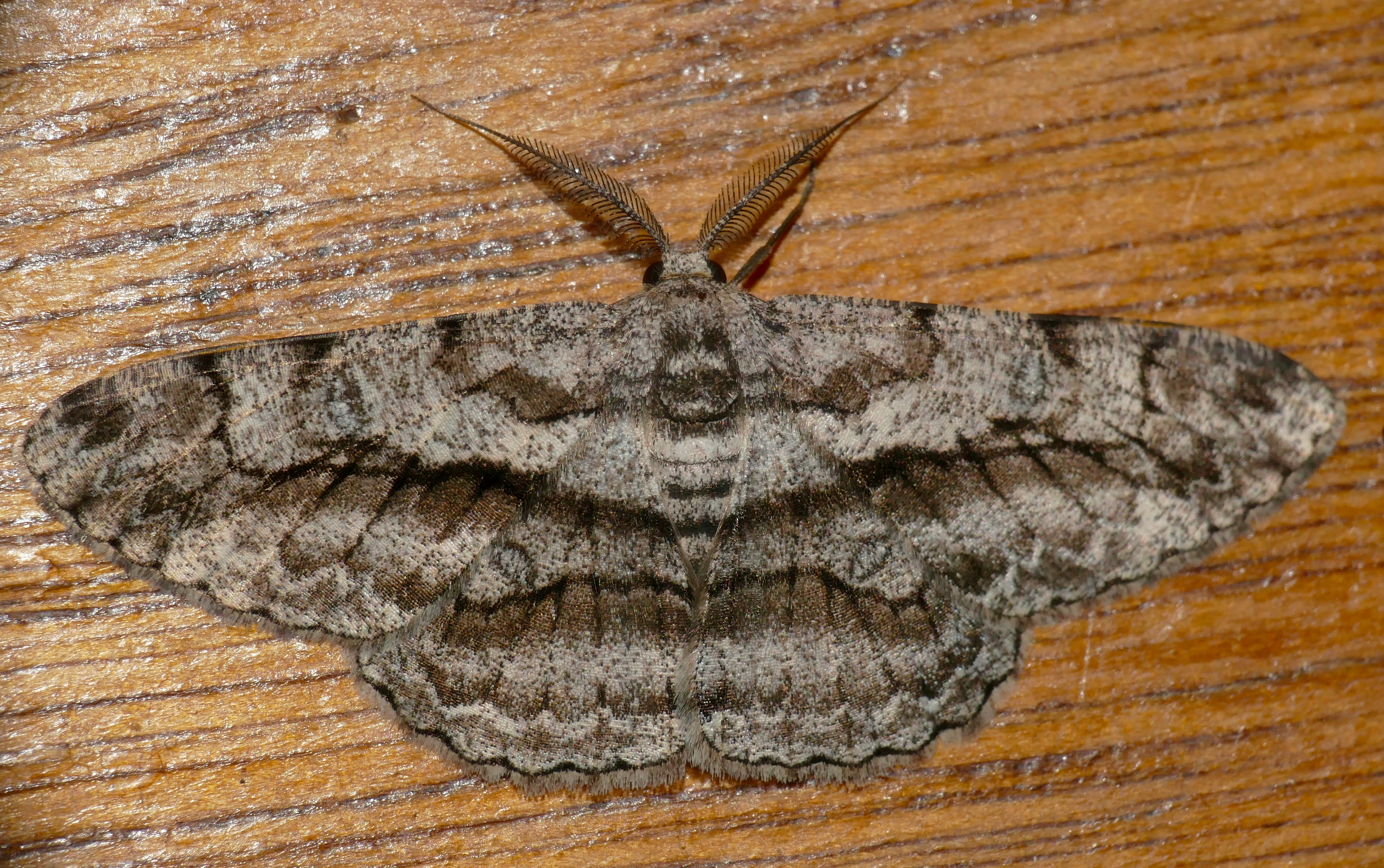
Zeuctoboarmia hyrax in Kruger National Park , South Africa

Zeuctoboarmia is a genus of moths in the family Geometridae erected by Louis Beethoven Prout in 1915.

== Species ==
- Zeuctoboarmia contortilinea (Warren, 1897) Congo
- Zeuctoboarmia hyrax (Townsend, 1952)
- Zeuctoboarmia pectinata (Warren, 1897)
- Zeuctoboarmia sabinei (Prout, 1915) Zimbabwe
- Zeuctoboarmia simplex (Warren, 1898)
- Zeuctoboarmia smithi (Warren, 1902) Congo
- Zeuctoboarmia translata Prout, 1915 Kenya
