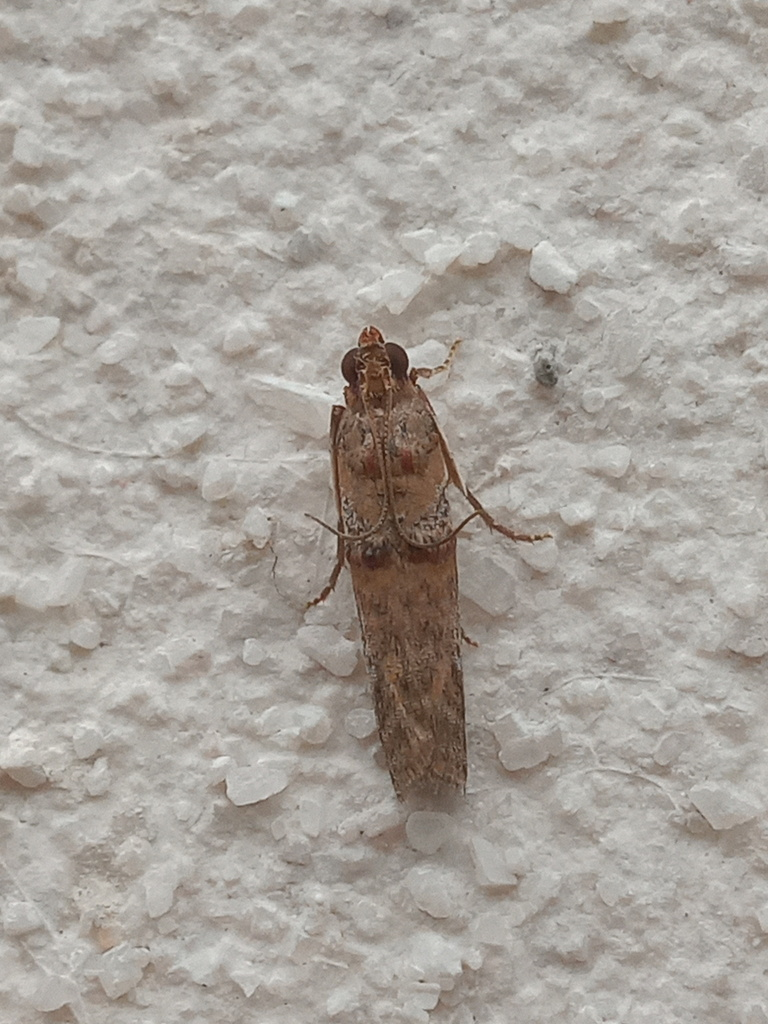

Scientific classification
- Domain: Eukaryota
- Kingdom: Animalia
- Phylum: Arthropoda
- Class: Insecta
- Order: Lepidoptera
- Family: Pyralidae
- Genus: Hypargyria
- Species: H. slossonella

Binomial name
- Hypargyria slossonella (Hulst, 1900)

Synonyms
- Salebria slossonella Hulst, 1900; Acrobasis tenuella Barnes & McDunnough, 1913

= Hypargyria slossonella =

Species of moth

Hypargyria slossonella is a species of snout moth in the genus Hypargyria. It was described by George Duryea Hulst in 1900, and is known from Florida and Mexico.

There are several generations per year.

The larvae feed on Hippocratea volubilis.
