= Maliarpha validella =

Scientific classification
- Domain: Eukaryota
- Kingdom: Animalia
- Phylum: Arthropoda
- Class: Insecta
- Order: Lepidoptera
- Family: Pyralidae
- Genus: Maliarpha
- Species: M. validella

Binomial name
- Maliarpha validella Zerny in Rebel & Zerny, 1917

Species of moth

Maliarpha validella is a species of snout moth in the genus Maliarpha. It was described by Zerny in 1917, and is known from Sudan (including Sennar, the type location).
