= Emmelia tanzaniae =

Scientific classification
- Kingdom: Animalia
- Phylum: Arthropoda
- Clade: Pancrustacea
- Class: Insecta
- Order: Lepidoptera
- Superfamily: Noctuoidea
- Family: Noctuidae
- Genus: Emmelia
- Species: E. tanzaniae

Binomial name
- Emmelia tanzaniae Hacker, Legrain & Fibiger, 2008

Species of moth

Emmelia tanzaniae is a species of moth in the family Noctuidae. It was described by Hacker, Legrain & Fibiger in 2008. This species can be found in eastern and southern Africa.
