= Hypargyria impecuniosa =

Scientific classification
- Kingdom: Animalia
- Phylum: Arthropoda
- Clade: Pancrustacea
- Class: Insecta
- Order: Lepidoptera
- Family: Pyralidae
- Genus: Hypargyria
- Species: H. impecuniosa

Binomial name
- Hypargyria impecuniosa de Joannis, 1927

Species of moth

Hypargyria impecuniosa is a species of snout moth in the genus Hypargyria. It was described by Joseph de Joannis in 1927 and is known from Mozambique.
