= Emmelia natalis =

Scientific classification
- Kingdom: Animalia
- Phylum: Arthropoda
- Clade: Pancrustacea
- Class: Insecta
- Order: Lepidoptera
- Superfamily: Noctuoidea
- Family: Noctuidae
- Genus: Emmelia
- Species: E. natalis

Binomial name
- Emmelia natalis Guenée, 1852

Species of moth

Emmelia natalis is a species of moth in the family Noctuidae. It was described by Achille Guenée in 1852. This species can be found in eastern and southern Africa.
