= Emmelia aureola =

Scientific classification
- Kingdom: Animalia
- Phylum: Arthropoda
- Clade: Pancrustacea
- Class: Insecta
- Order: Lepidoptera
- Superfamily: Noctuoidea
- Family: Noctuidae
- Genus: Emmelia
- Species: E. aureola

Binomial name
- Emmelia aureola Hacker, 2007

Species of moth

Emmelia aureola is a species of moth in the family Noctuidae. It was described by the European lepidopterist Hermann H. Hacker in 2007. This species is endemic to Namibia.
