= Maliarpha rosella =

Scientific classification
- Kingdom: Animalia
- Phylum: Arthropoda
- Class: Insecta
- Order: Lepidoptera
- Family: Pyralidae
- Genus: Maliarpha
- Species: M. rosella

Binomial name
- Maliarpha rosella (Hampson, 1896)

Synonyms
- Saluria rosella Hampson, 1896

Species of moth

Maliarpha rosella is a species of snout moth in the genus Maliarpha. It was described by George Hampson in 1896 and is known from India (including Nilgiris, the type location).
