= Emmelia antica =

Scientific classification
- Kingdom: Animalia
- Phylum: Arthropoda
- Clade: Pancrustacea
- Class: Insecta
- Order: Lepidoptera
- Superfamily: Noctuoidea
- Family: Noctuidae
- Genus: Emmelia
- Species: E. antica

Binomial name
- Emmelia antica Walker, 1862

Species of moth

Emmelia antica is a species of moth in the family Noctuidae. It was described by Francis Walker in 1862. This species can be found throughout much of the Afrotropical realm.
