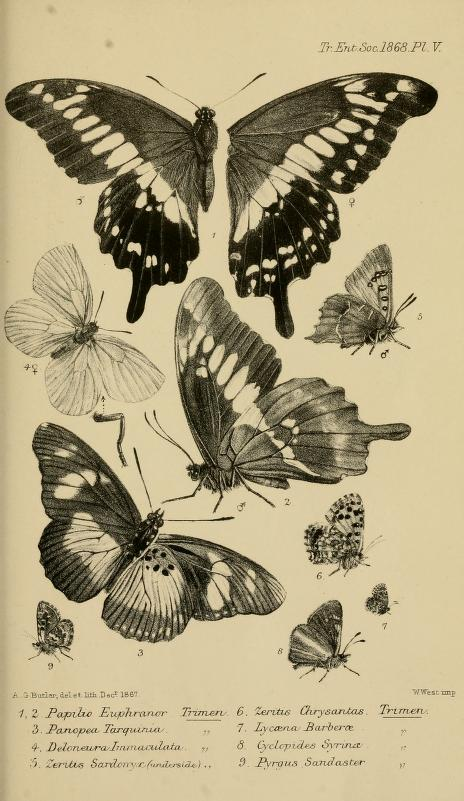
- Illustration accompanying Trimen's description in Transactions of the Entomological Society of London, 1868
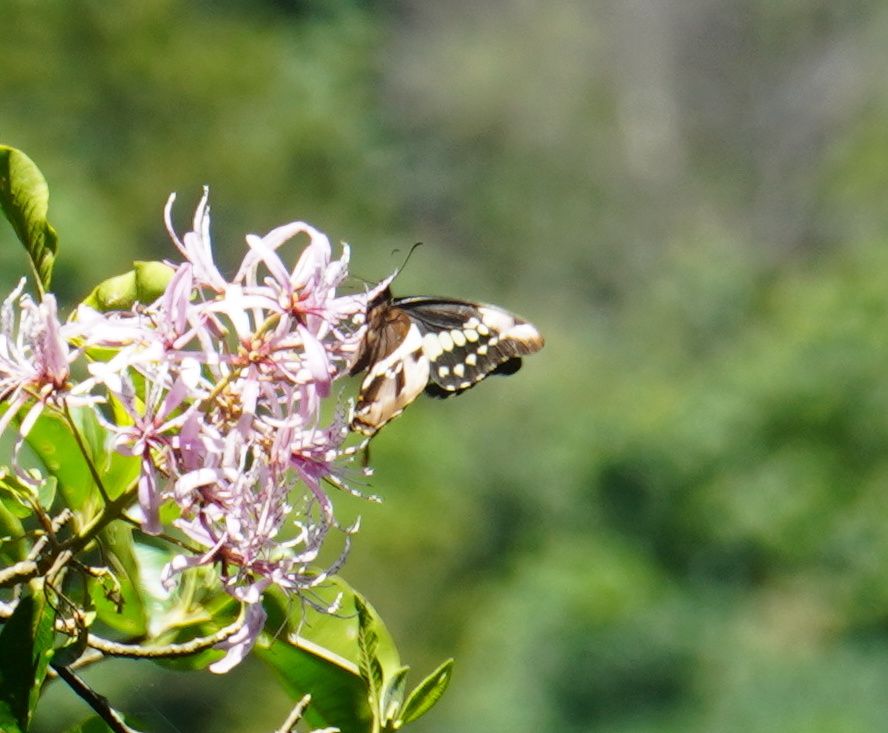

Scientific classification
- Kingdom: Animalia
- Phylum: Arthropoda
- Clade: Pancrustacea
- Class: Insecta
- Order: Lepidoptera
- Family: Papilionidae
- Genus: Papilio
- Species: P. euphranor

Binomial name
- Papilio euphranor Trimen, 1868.

Synonyms
- Papilio euphranor moratus Le Cerf, 1924

= Papilio euphranor =

Forest swallowtail

Species of butterfly

Papilio euphranor, the forest swallowtail or bush kite, is a butterfly of the family Papilionidae. It is found in southern Africa.

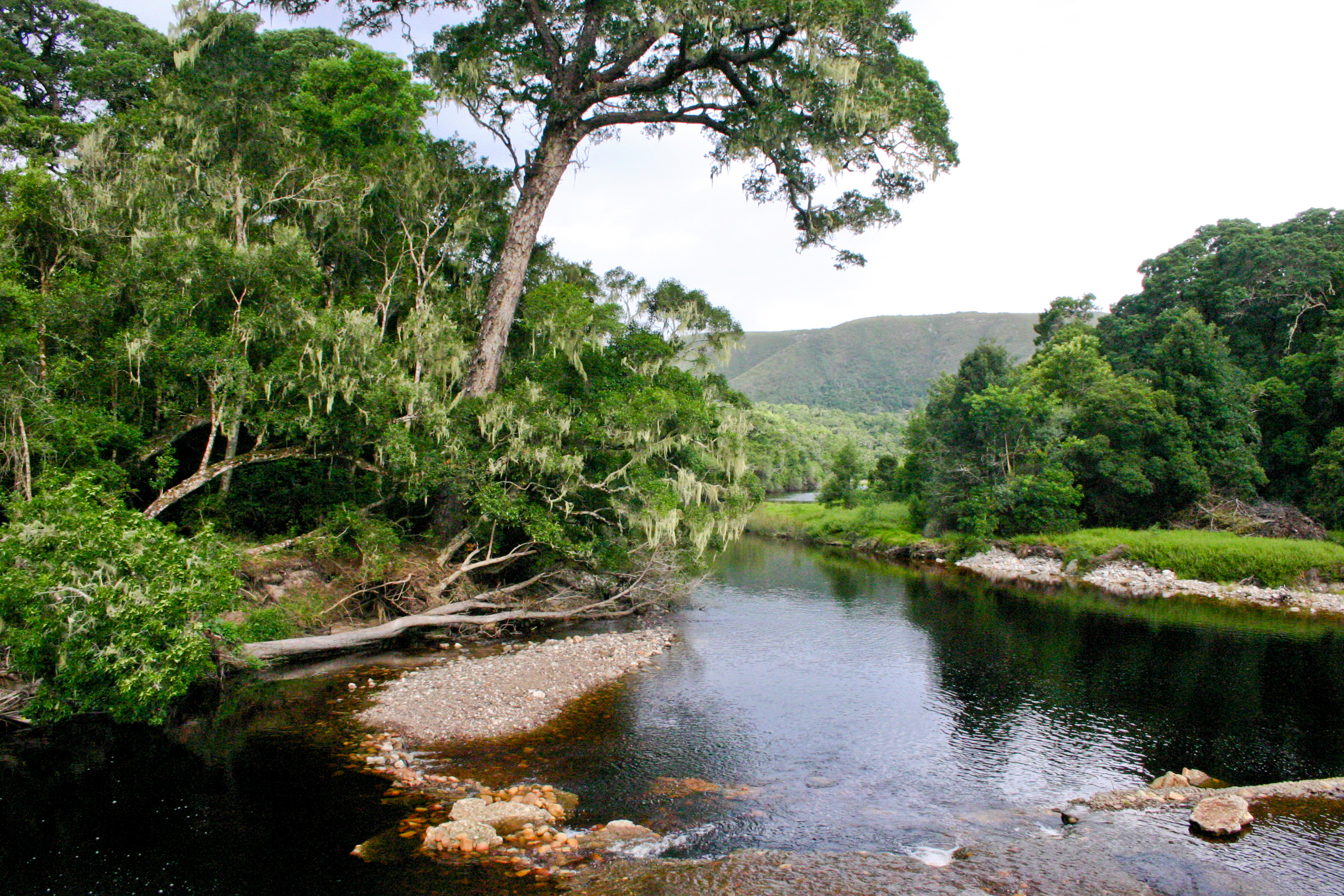
Habitat.Groot River, Western Cape

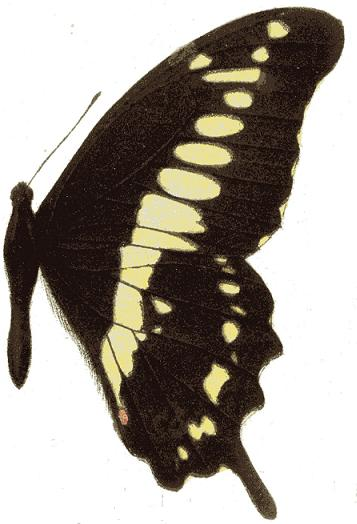
Papilio euphranor depicted in Seitz

== Description ==
The wingspan is 80–100 mm in males and 90–110 mm in females.

Male On the obverse, the wings are black. The forewings have a patchy cream band and a few marginal macules of the same color. The hindwings have slightly spatulate tails. The hindwings are a little paler in the basal area, they have a cream band and a series of irregular submarginal macules of the same color, as well as a small orange dot in the anal angle.

On the reverse side, the wings are brown. The forewing patterns are similar, but the wings are paler at the apex. The cream band on the hindwings is thinner, and there are a few additional cream macules in the discal area. However, the orange dot on the anal angle is absent, and the submarginal macules are almost obliterated.

Female The female is slightly lighter than the male. On the obverse, the forewing patterns are similar to those of the male, but with the addition of a series of cream-colored submarginal macules. The hindwings are quite similar to those of the male, but have two series of cream-colored submarginal macules. The orange dot on the anal angle is significantly larger.

On the reverse the wings are brown with lighter areas. The pattern is similar to that on the obverse, but the cream bands on the hindwings are thinner, there are some additional cream-coloured macules. The submarginal macules on the hindwings are almost obliterated and the orange dot becomes a lunule of the same colour.

== Biology ==
The species lives in temperate evergreen forests. It has two flight periods from January to April and September to December.

The larvae feed on Cryptocarya woodii. and Cryptocarya latifolia

The female lays her eggs on the host plant. The caterpillar goes through five instars before transforming into a chrysalis, and the chrysalis is held upside down by a silk belt, as in closely related species. The complete cycle, from caterpillar hatching to adult hatching, takes about 70 days.

Adults are present from August to May, with peak emergence in September and October and from April to February. Both sexes feed on flower nectar, with a preference for red flowers, such as Burchellia bubalinaAdults are generally attracted to anything red, such as a red hat or a red car.

Males are territorial and defend a territory often located in a clearing between tall trees. Females often fly at the edge of forests or along forest paths, where they forage on flowers

== Taxonomy ==
Papilio euphranor is a member of the hesperus species group. The members of the clade are:

- Papilio hesperus Westwood, 1843
- Papilio euphranor Trimen, 1868
- Papilio horribilis Butler, 1874
- Papilio pelodurus Butler, 1896
