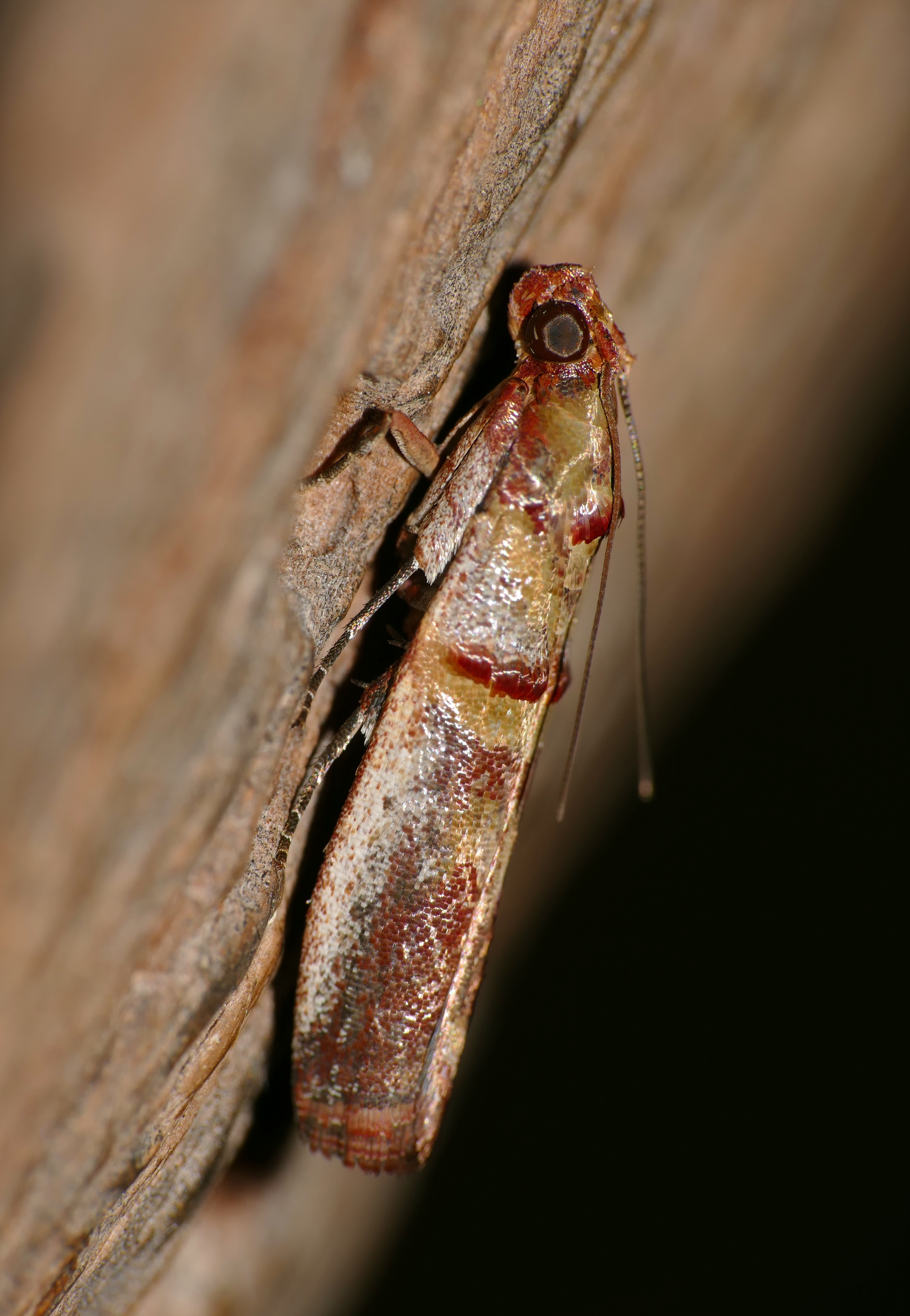
- Hypargyria metalliferella

Scientific classification
- Domain: Eukaryota
- Kingdom: Animalia
- Phylum: Arthropoda
- Class: Insecta
- Order: Lepidoptera
- Family: Pyralidae
- Tribe: Phycitini
- Genus: Hypargyria; Ragonot, 1888

= Hypargyria =

Genus of moths

Hypargyria is a genus of snout moths. It was described by Émile Louis Ragonot in 1888.

== Species ==
- Hypargyria definitella (Zeller, 1881) (from South America, Caribbean)
- Hypargyria impecuniosa de Joannis, 1927 (from Mozambique)
- Hypargyria metalliferella Ragonot, 1888 (Africa, southern Asia, Australia)
- Hypargyria slossonella (Hulst, 1900) (Florida & Mexico)
