= Maliarpha brunnella =

Scientific classification
- Domain: Eukaryota
- Kingdom: Animalia
- Phylum: Arthropoda
- Class: Insecta
- Order: Lepidoptera
- Family: Pyralidae
- Genus: Maliarpha
- Species: M. brunnella

Binomial name
- Maliarpha brunnella Cook, 1997

Species of moth

Maliarpha brunnella is a species of snout moth in the genus Maliarpha. It was described by Cook in 1997, and is known from Sudan (including Mongalla, the type location).
