= Terastia margaritis =

Scientific classification
- Kingdom: Animalia
- Phylum: Arthropoda
- Clade: Pancrustacea
- Class: Insecta
- Order: Lepidoptera
- Family: Crambidae
- Genus: Terastia
- Species: T. margaritis

Binomial name
- Terastia margaritis (C. Felder, R. Felder & Rogenhofer, 1875)

Synonyms
- Agathodes margaritis C. Felder, R. Felder & Rogenhofer, 1875

Species of moth

Terastia margaritis is a moth in the family Crambidae. It was described by Cajetan Felder, Rudolf Felder and Alois Friedrich Rogenhofer in 1875. It is found in the Democratic Republic of the Congo (Katanga), South Africa (KwaZulu-Natal, Gauteng) and Zambia.
