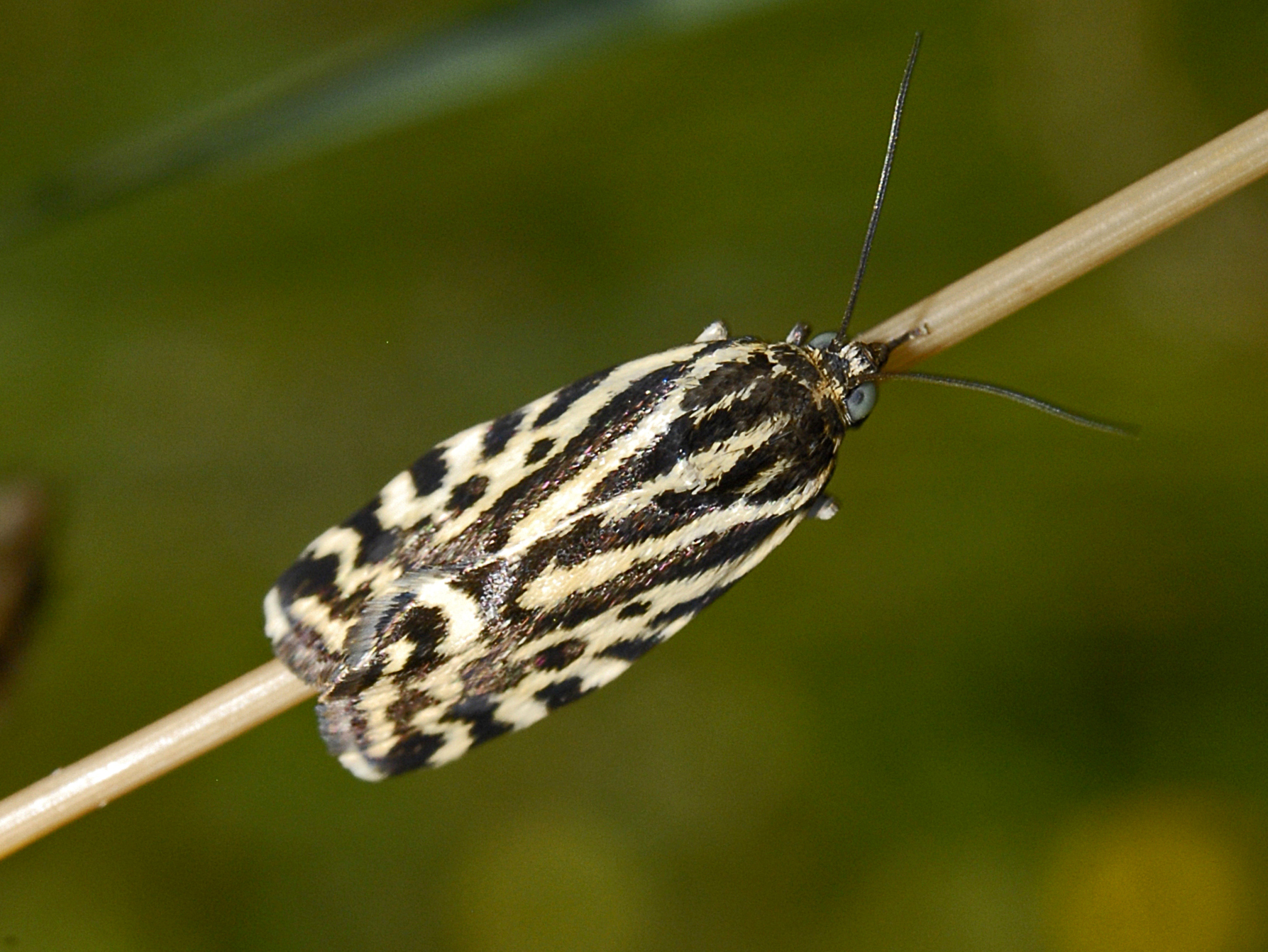
- Emmelia trabealis

Scientific classification
- Kingdom: Animalia
- Phylum: Arthropoda
- Clade: Pancrustacea
- Class: Insecta
- Order: Lepidoptera
- Superfamily: Noctuoidea
- Family: Noctuidae
- Subfamily: Acontiinae
- Genus: Emmelia; Hübner, [1821]

Synonyms
- Agrophila Boisduval, 1840; Erotyla Hübner, 1822

= Emmelia =

Genus of moths

Emmelia is a genus of bird dropping moths in the family Noctuidae, found primarily in Africa and the Palearctic.

Emmelia is a name available as a genus name for a group of butterflies of the subfamily Acontiinae (Noctuidae). However, its status is uncertain. The name Emmelia is also known as subgenus in the genus Acontia and it is sometimes considered a synonym of Acontia.

== Species ==
These species belong to the genus Emmelia:

- Emmelia albovittata Hacker, 2013 (Africa)
- Emmelia amarei Hacker, Legrain & Fibiger, 2010 (Africa)
- Emmelia antica, Walker, 1862 (africa)
- Emmelia atripars Hampson, 1914 (Africa)
- Emmelia aureola Hacker, 2007 (Africa)
- Emmelia basifera Walker, 1857 (Africa)
- Emmelia bellula (Hacker, 2010)
- Emmelia bethunebakeri Hacker, Legrain & Fibiger, 2010 (Africa)
- Emmelia binominata (Butler, 1892)
- Emmelia callima Bethune-Baker, 1911 (Africa)
- Emmelia citrelinea Bethune-Baker, 1911 (Africa)
- Emmelia conifrons Aurivillius, 1879
- Emmelia dichroa Hampson, 1914 (Africa and temperate Asia)
- Emmelia eburnea Hacker, 2010
- Emmelia esperiana Hacker, Legrain & Fibiger, 2010 (Africa)
- Emmelia fascialis (Hampson, 1894)
- Emmelia fastrei Hacker, Legrain & Fibiger, 2010 (Africa)
- Emmelia fuscoalba (Hacker, 2010)
- Emmelia homonyma Hacker, Legrain & Fibiger, 2010 (Africa)
- Emmelia karachiensis Swinhoe, 1889 (Africa and temperate Asia)
- Emmelia lanzai (Berio, 1985) (Africa)
- Emmelia manakhana Hacker, Legrain & Fibiger, 2010 (temperate Asia)
- Emmelia mascheriniae (Berio, 1985) (Africa)
- Emmelia mineti Hacker, 2011 (Africa)
- Emmelia natalis Guenée, 1852 (Africa)
- Emmelia nephele Hampson, 1911 (Africa)
- Emmelia notha Hacker, Legrain & Fibiger, 2010 (Africa)
- Emmelia nubila Hampson, 1910 (Africa and temperate Asia)
- Emmelia obliqua Hacker, Legrain & Fibiger, 2010 (Africa)
- Emmelia paraalba Hacker, Legrain & Fibiger, 2010 (Africa)
- Emmelia philbyi (Wiltshire, 1988) (temperate Asia)
- Emmelia praealba Hacker, Legrain & Fibiger, 2010 (Africa)
- Emmelia purpurata Hacker, Legrain & Fibiger, 2010 (Africa)
- Emmelia robertbecki Hacker, Legrain & Fibiger, 2010 (Africa)
- Emmelia saldaitis Hacker, Legrain & Fibiger, 2010
- Emmelia schreieri Hacker, Legrain & Fibiger, 2010 (Africa)
- Emmelia semialba Hampson, 1910 (Africa and temperate Asia)
- Emmelia stassarti (Hacker, 2010)
- Emmelia subnotha (Hacker, 2010)
- Emmelia szunyoghyi Hacker, Legrain & Fibiger, 2010 (Africa)
- Emmelia tanzaniae Hacker, Legrain & Fibiger, 2008 (Africa)
- Emmelia trabealis (Scopoli, 1763) (spotted sulphur) (temperate Asia and Europe)
- Emmelia veroxanthia Hacker, Legrain & Fibiger, 2010 (Africa)
- Emmelia viridisquama (Guenée, 1852) (Europe)
