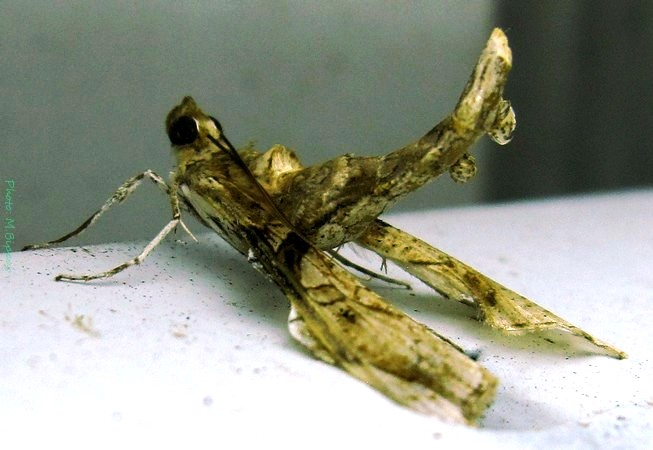

Scientific classification
- Kingdom: Animalia
- Phylum: Arthropoda
- Class: Insecta
- Order: Lepidoptera
- Family: Crambidae
- Genus: Terastia
- Species: T. subjectalis

Binomial name
- Terastia subjectalis Lederer, 1863

Synonyms
- Terastia sujectalis Zimmerman, 1958; Megaphysa quadratalis Walker, 1865

= Terastia subjectalis =

Species of moth

Terastia subjectalis is a moth of the family Crambidae. It occurs across the Indian and south Pacific oceans, including Fiji, Hawaii, Réunion, Okinawa, Samoa, the Society Islands, Sri Lanka and Australia (the Northern Territory, Queensland and Western Australia).
