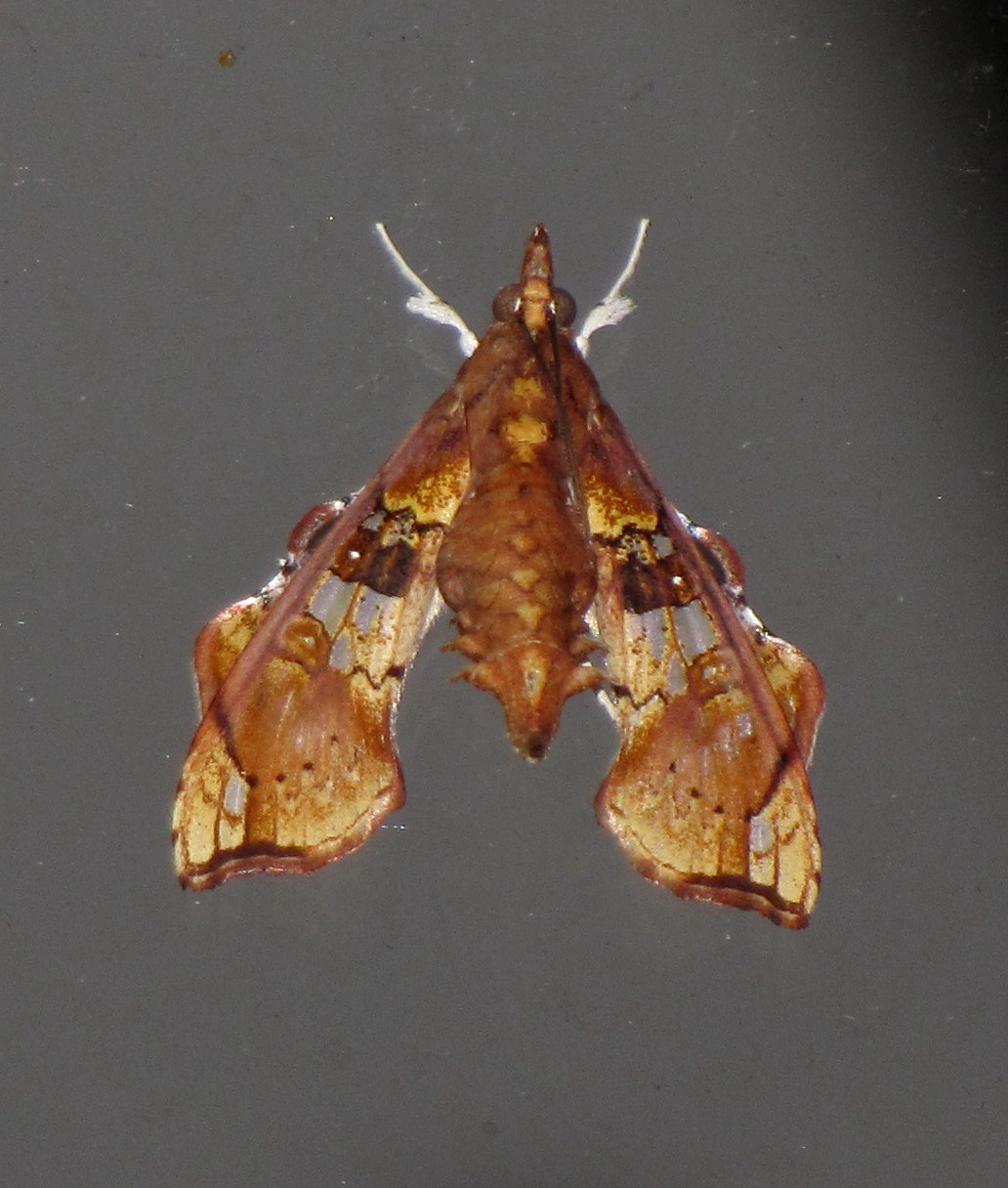

Scientific classification
- Kingdom: Animalia
- Phylum: Arthropoda
- Class: Insecta
- Order: Lepidoptera
- Family: Crambidae
- Genus: Terastia
- Species: T. egialealis

Binomial name
- Terastia egialealis (Walker, 1859)

Synonyms
- Megaphysa egialealis Walker, 1859; Agathodes diversalis Walker, 1866

= Terastia egialealis =

Species of moth

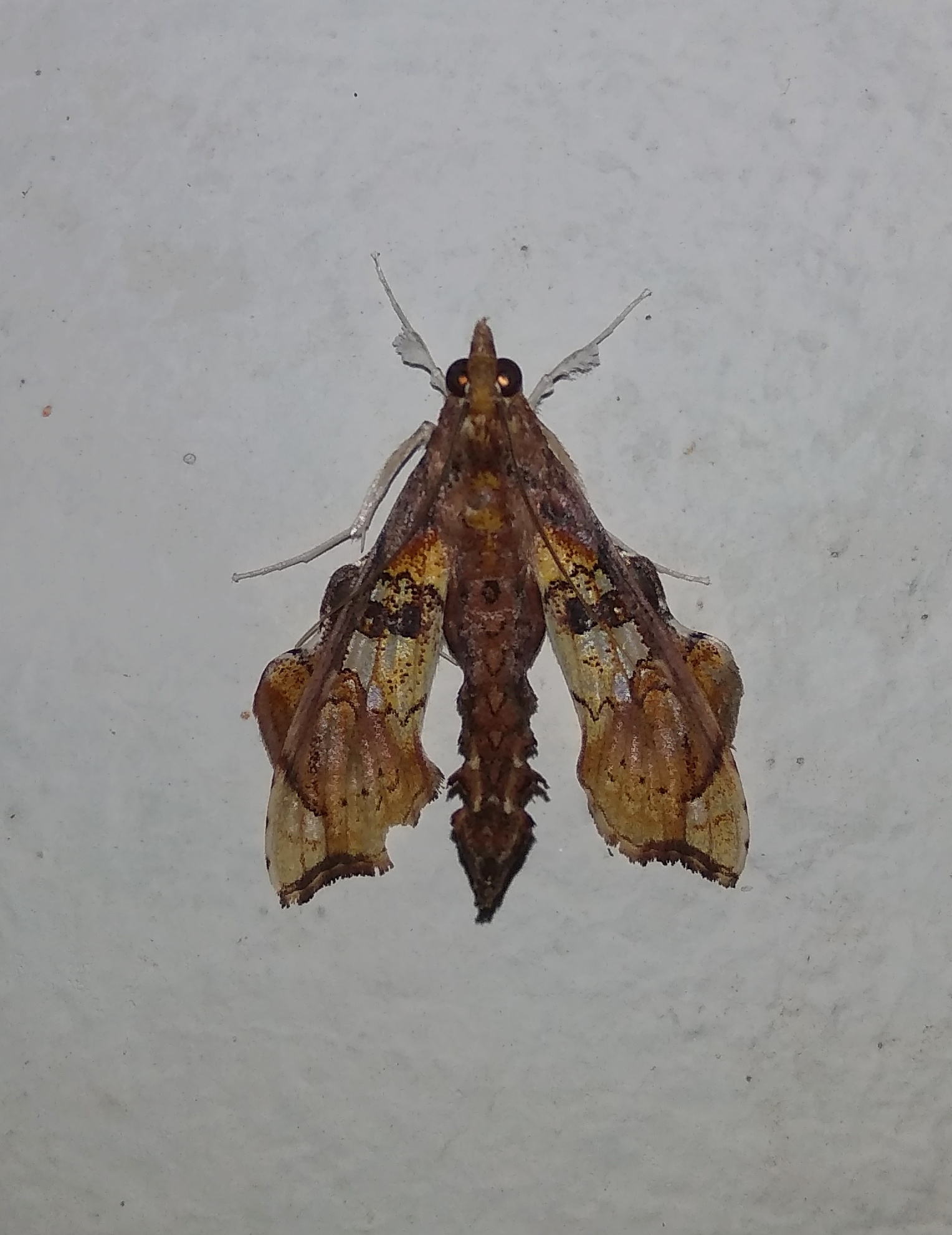
Terastia egialealis from koottanad, Palakkad, Kerala, India

Terastia egialealis is a moth in the family Crambidae and subfamily Spilomelinae. The species was first described by Francis Walker in 1859. It is found in India, China, Nepal, Thailand, West Malaysia, Sumatra, Java, Borneo, and Sulawesi.
