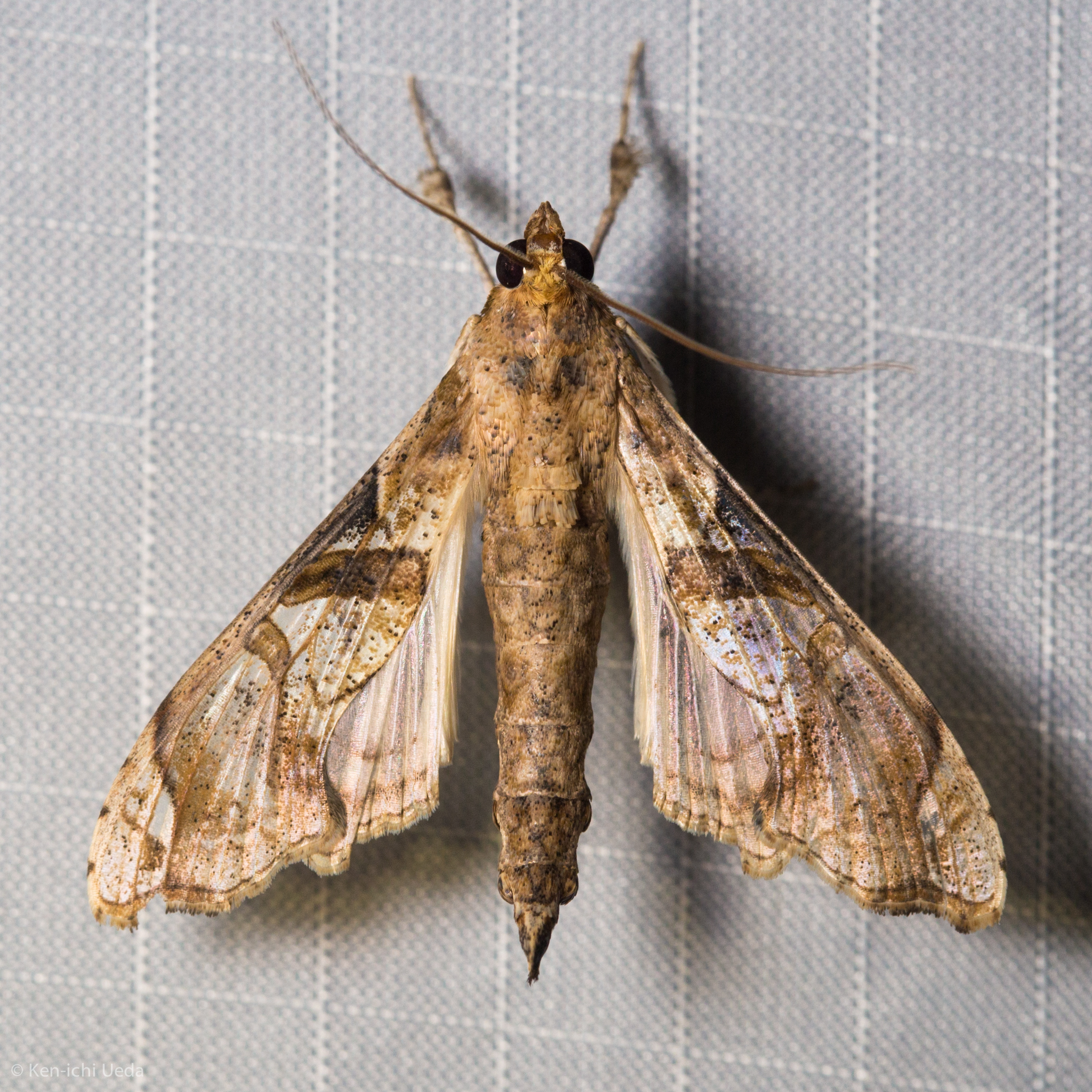

Scientific classification
- Kingdom: Animalia
- Phylum: Arthropoda
- Clade: Pancrustacea
- Class: Insecta
- Order: Lepidoptera
- Family: Crambidae
- Genus: Terastia
- Species: T. meticulosalis

Binomial name
- Terastia meticulosalis Guenee, 1854

Synonyms
- Megaphysa quadratalis Walker, 1866; Megastes coeligenalis Hulst, 1886

= Terastia meticulosalis =

Species of moth

Terastia meticulosalis, also known as the erythrina twigborer or erythrina borer, is a species of moth in the family Crambidae. It has a wide distribution. In North America, it has been recorded from south-eastern Arizona, southern Texas, Louisiana and Florida. It is also present in Jamaica.

The wingspan is about 39 mm.

The larvae feed on Erythrina species. It has been present in significant numbers in California since 2016, where it considered a pest of ornamental/introduced coral trees.
