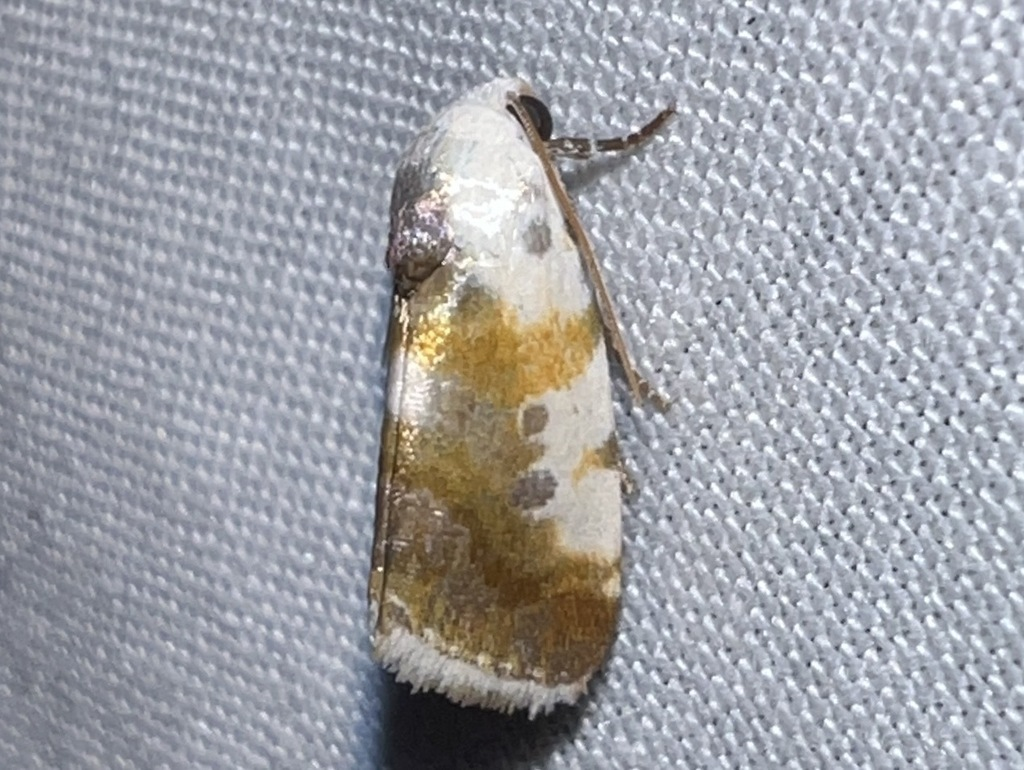
- Emmelia citrelinea

Scientific classification
- Kingdom: Animalia
- Phylum: Arthropoda
- Clade: Pancrustacea
- Class: Insecta
- Order: Lepidoptera
- Superfamily: Noctuoidea
- Family: Noctuidae
- Genus: Emmelia
- Species: E. citrelinea

Binomial name
- Emmelia citrelinea Bethune-Baker, 1911

= Emmelia citrelinea =

Species of moth

Emmelia citrelinea is a species of moth in the family Noctuidae. It was described by George Thomas Bethune-Baker in 1911. This species can be found in western and central Africa.
