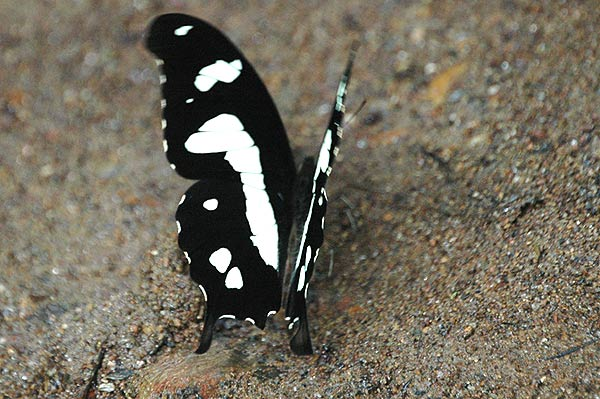

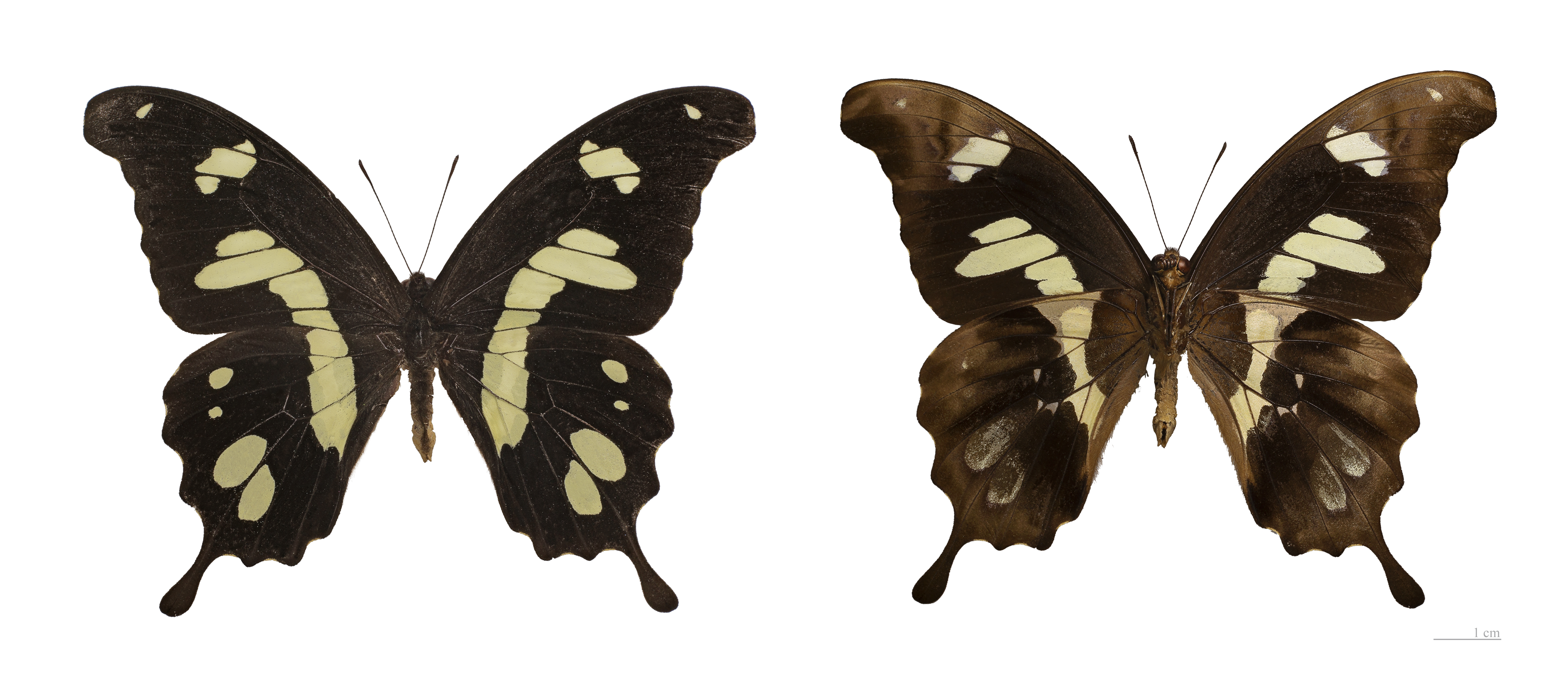
- Mounted

Scientific classification
- Kingdom: Animalia
- Phylum: Arthropoda
- Clade: Pancrustacea
- Class: Insecta
- Order: Lepidoptera
- Family: Papilionidae
- Genus: Papilio
- Species: P. hesperus

Binomial name
- Papilio hesperus Westwood, 1843

Synonyms
- Princeps hesperus; Papilio embodinus Ehrmann, 1921; Papilio horribilis var. calabaricus Distant, 1879; Papilio hesperus maculatissimus Suffert, 1904; Papilio hesperus f. additionis Strand, 1913; Papilio hesperus f. bukoba Richelmann, 1913; Papilio hesperus ab. dualana Strand, 1914; Papilio hesperus var. kassaiensis Moreau, 1917; Papilio hesperus f. insolitus Le Cerf, 1924; Papilio hesperus f. rufopuncta Stoneham, 1944; Papilio hesperus hesperus ab. lagai Dufrane, 1946; Papilio hesperus hesperus ab. blariauxi Dufrane, 1946; Papilio hesperus hesperus ab. cuvelieri Dufrane, 1946; Papilio hesperus hesperus f. mariae Dufrane, 1953; Papilio hesperus hesperus f. punctata Dufrane, 1953

= Papilio hesperus =

Species of butterfly

Papilio hesperus, the black and yellow swallowtail or Hesperus swallowtail, is a butterfly of the family Papilionidae. It is found in Africa. It is monomorphic, meaning there is only one phenotype in the population of this species. The dorsal and ventral sides of its wings are practically identical due to the wing's translucence.

== Description ==
Papilio hesperus is a very large butterfly with a wingspan of 110 to 130 mm , with a very concave outer edge of the forewings and scalloped hindwings with a club-shaped tail . The wings are brown to black decorated with pale yellow spots, part of which forms a band with brown veins from half of the forewings to their inner edge and then from the costal edge to the inner edge of the hindwings. Two spots are on the hindwings near the tail.

== Biology ==
The larvae feed on Beilschmiedia species, including Beilschmiedia ugandensis.

== Taxonomy ==
Papilio hesperus is the nominal member of the hesperus species group. The members of the clade are:

- Papilio hesperus Westwood, 1843
- Papilio euphranor Trimen, 1868
- Papilio horribilis Butler, 1874
- Papilio pelodurus Butler, 1896

== Subspecies ==
- Papilio hesperus hesperus (Nigeria, Cameroon, Equatorial Guinea, Congo, Congo Republic, Uganda, north-western Tanzania, northern Zambia)
- Papilio hesperus feae Storace, 1963 Equatorial Guinea)
- Papilio hesperus sudana Gabriel, 1945 (southern Sudan)

== Habitats ==
Congolian forests and surrounding ecoregions.

== Biogeographic realm ==
Afrotropical realm.
