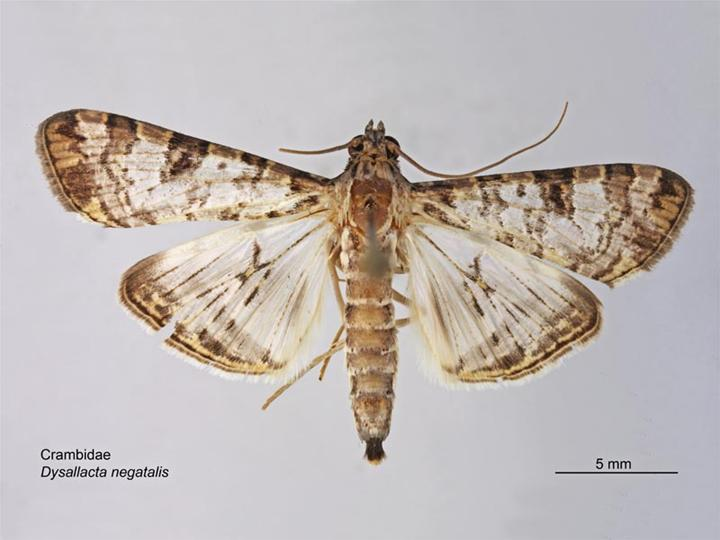
- Dorsal view
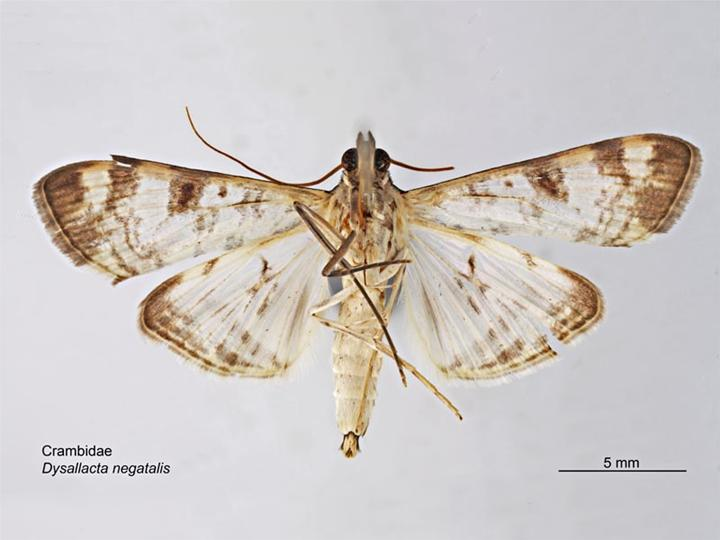
- Ventral view

Scientific classification
- Kingdom: Animalia
- Phylum: Arthropoda
- Clade: Pancrustacea
- Class: Insecta
- Order: Lepidoptera
- Family: Crambidae
- Genus: Glyphodes
- Species: G. negatalis

Binomial name
- Glyphodes negatalis (Walker, 1859)

Synonyms
- Phalangiodes negatalis Walker, 1859; Dysallacta negatalis (Walker, 1859); Botys monesusalis Walker, 1859; Botys phanasalis Walker, 1859

= Glyphodes negatalis =

Karanj defoliator

Species of moth

Glyphodes negatalis, the karanj defoliator, is a moth of the family Crambidae. The species was first described by Francis Walker in 1859. It has a wide range in the tropics, including South Africa, The Gambia, Mali, India, Sri Lanka, Hong Kong, Japan, and eastern Australia (including New South Wales and Queensland).

The wingspan is about 20 mm.

== Biology ==
The larvae feed on Dillenia indica, Ficus microcarpa and Ficus religiosa (Moraceae). In India, they had been found also as a main defoliator of Pongamia pinnata (karanj), and in Japan, the larvae had been found on Ficus superba var. japonica.
