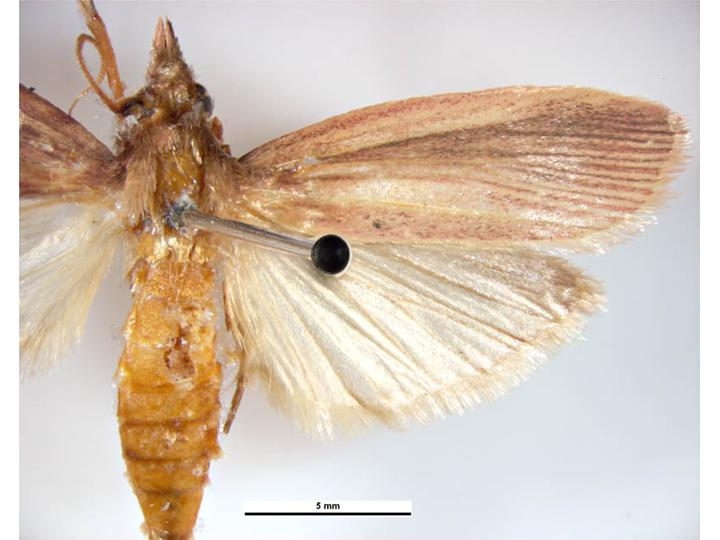

Scientific classification
- Kingdom: Animalia
- Phylum: Arthropoda
- Clade: Pancrustacea
- Class: Insecta
- Order: Lepidoptera
- Family: Pyralidae
- Genus: Maliarpha
- Species: M. separatella

Binomial name
- Maliarpha separatella Ragonot, 1888

Synonyms
- Biafra separatella; Anerastia pallidicosta Hampson, 1896; Enosima vectiferella Ragonot, 1901

= Maliarpha separatella =

African white stemborer

Species of moth

Maliarpha separatella, the African white stemborer, is a species of moth of the family Pyralidae. A worldwide paddy pest, it is found throughout African countries of Cameroon, Mali, Réunion, Madagascar, South Africa, and many Asian paddy cultivating countries such as Myanmar, India, and Sri Lanka. Though they are reported from China and Papua New Guinea, they are also known to attack sugarcane.

== Description ==
The wingspan is about 20–30 mm. Palpi of male with second joint hollowed out to receive the brush-like maxillary palpi. Antennae with a sinus at base of shaft containing a ridge of scales. Palpi porrect. Male has rufous head and thorax. Abdomen ochreous. Forewings suffused with rufous, darkest below the broad pale costal fascia, which does not reach apex. Hindwings yellowish white. Female moth is much reddish, with a costal fascia often deeply suffused with red.

== Ecology ==
The larvae feed on various grasses, including Zea mays, Andropogon tectorum, Oryza species, Saccharum sp., and Sorghum species.

== Attack and control ==
Caterpillars are the major attacking stage. They bore and tunnel in to the tillers and stem and feed on internal tissues and sap. The heavy attack shows small, circular cavities in the stem. This species rarely causes deadhearts or whiteheads.

Control can be easy by measures such as stubble rotting, adjusting planting dates and adjusting planting density. Trap crops are used in southwest Nigeria, and this has been effective.

Unlike other paddy pests, biological control of this species is not very effective. This is because the borers spend the larval stage within plant stems. But recent study listed five parasitoids that are effective to the borers; they are, Chelonus maudae, Rhacanotus carinafus, Prisfomerus bullis, Prisfomerus caris and Venturia jordanae.

Chemical control is effective.
