= Terastia africana =

Scientific classification
- Kingdom: Animalia
- Phylum: Arthropoda
- Clade: Pancrustacea
- Class: Insecta
- Order: Lepidoptera
- Family: Crambidae
- Genus: Terastia
- Species: T. africana

Binomial name
- Terastia africana Sourakov, 2015

Species of moth

Terastia africana is a species of moth in the family Crambidae. It was described by Andrei Sourakov in 2015, and is widespread throughout Africa.
