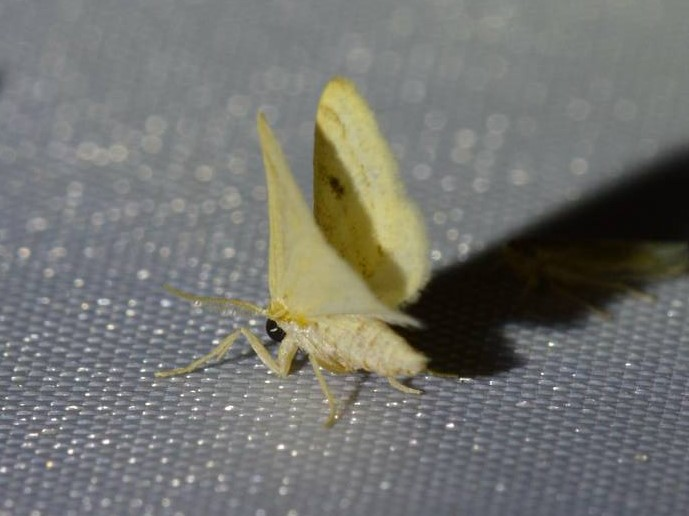

Scientific classification
- Kingdom: Animalia
- Phylum: Arthropoda
- Class: Insecta
- Order: Lepidoptera
- Family: Geometridae
- Genus: Acidaliastis
- Species: A. micra

Binomial name
- Acidaliastis micra Hampson, 1896

= Acidaliastis micra =

Species of moth

Acidaliastis micra is a species of moth in the family Geometridae first described by George Hampson in 1896. It is found in Sri Lanka. African countries of Chad, Algeria, Djibouti, Egypt, Ethiopia, Kenya, Niger, Sudan, Somalia towards Middle East countries of Saudi Arabia, Yemen and Oman.

Three subspecies recognized including the nominate race.

- Acidaliastis micra dissimilis Warren, 1905
- Acidaliastis micra galactea Rungs, 1943
- Acidaliastis micra micra Hampson, 1896
