= Scopula donovani =

Scientific classification
- Kingdom: Animalia
- Phylum: Arthropoda
- Clade: Pancrustacea
- Class: Insecta
- Order: Lepidoptera
- Family: Geometridae
- Genus: Scopula
- Species: S. donovani

Binomial name
- Scopula donovani (Distant, 1892)

Synonyms
- Lycauges donovani Distant, 1892; Longula extraordinaria Staudinger, 1892; Lycauges extremata Warren, 1897

Species of geometer moth in subfamily Sterrhinae

Scopula donovani is a moth of the family Geometridae. It is found in Morocco, Egypt, Kenya, Madagascar, Nigeria, South Africa and Uganda.
