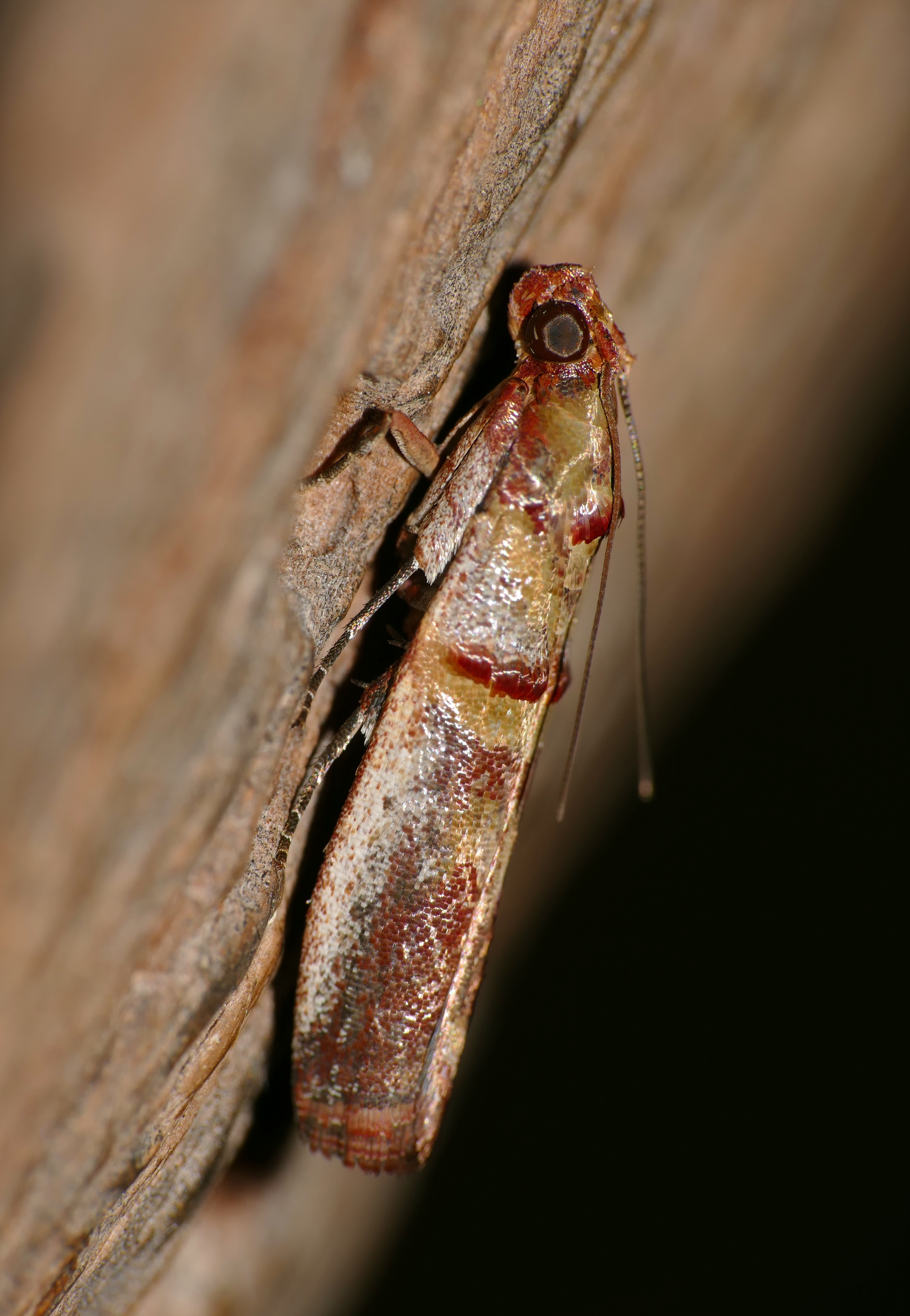

Scientific classification
- Kingdom: Animalia
- Phylum: Arthropoda
- Class: Insecta
- Order: Lepidoptera
- Family: Pyralidae
- Genus: Hypargyria
- Species: H. metalliferella

Binomial name
- Hypargyria metalliferella Ragonot, 1888

= Hypargyria metalliferella =

Species of moth

Hypargyria metalliferella, the silvered knothorn, is a species of snout moth in the genus Hypargyria. It was described by Émile Louis Ragonot in 1888. It is found in Namibia, South Africa, Australia (the Northern Territory, eastern Queensland and northern New South Wales), India and Sri Lanka.

The wingspan is 17–22 mm.

The larvae feed on the leaves of Siphonodon australe from within a slight web.
