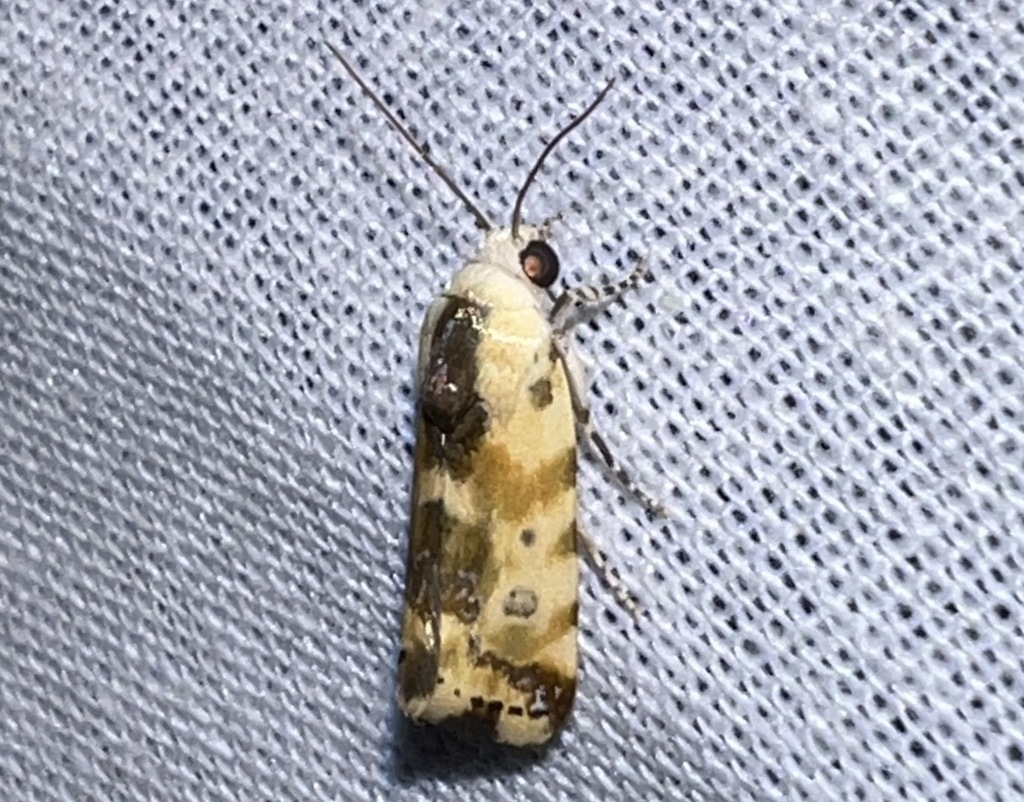
- Emmelia basifera

Scientific classification
- Kingdom: Animalia
- Phylum: Arthropoda
- Clade: Pancrustacea
- Class: Insecta
- Order: Lepidoptera
- Superfamily: Noctuoidea
- Family: Noctuidae
- Genus: Emmelia
- Species: E. basifera

Binomial name
- Emmelia basifera Walker, 1857

= Emmelia basifera =

Species of moth

Emmelia basifera is a species of moth in the family Noctuidae. It was described by Francis Walker in 1857. This species is found in many countries along the Sahel.
