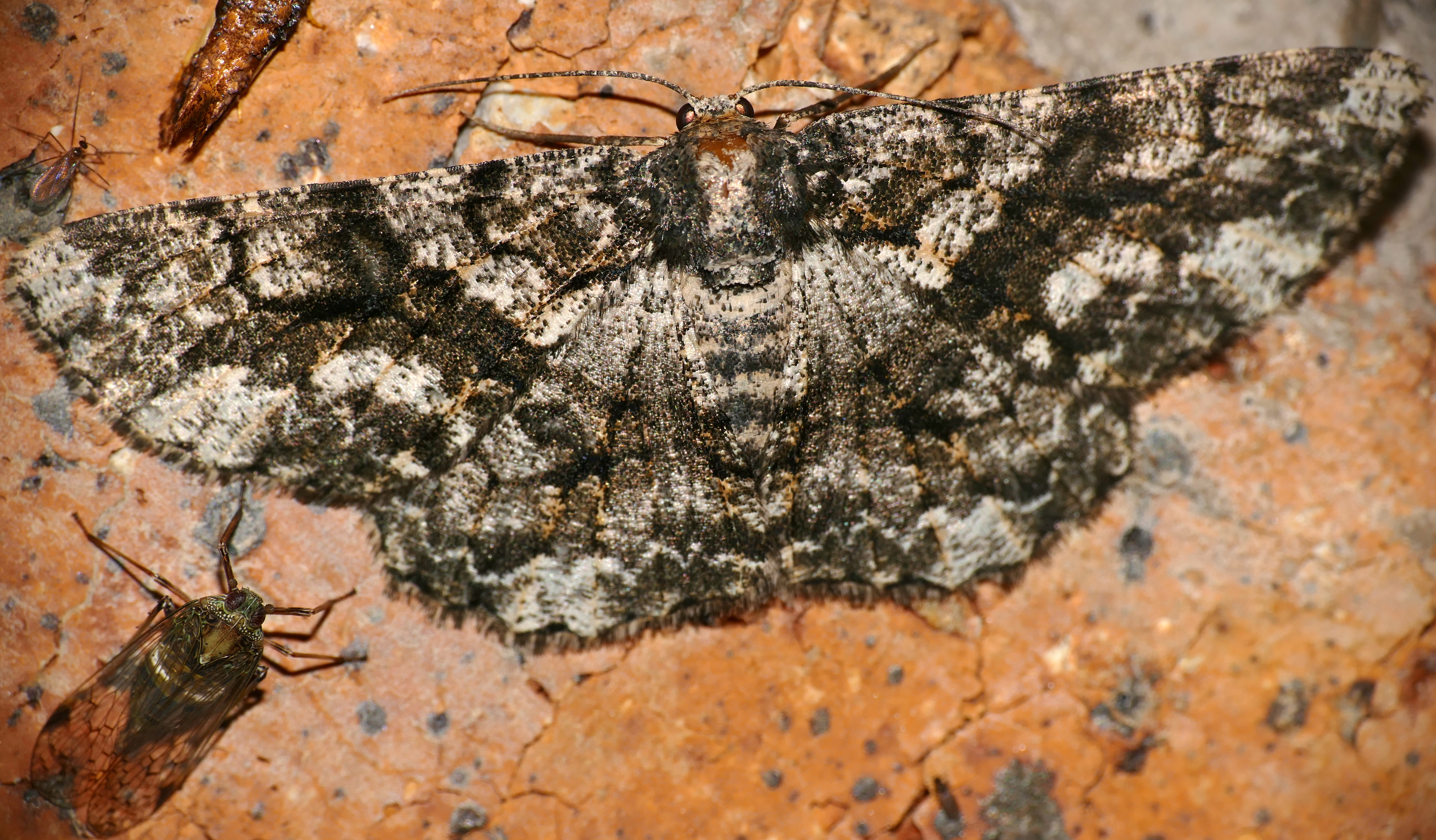

Scientific classification
- Kingdom: Animalia
- Phylum: Arthropoda
- Class: Insecta
- Order: Lepidoptera
- Family: Geometridae
- Genus: Zeuctoboarmia
- Species: Z. hyrax

Binomial name
- Zeuctoboarmia hyrax (Townsend, 1952)

Synonyms
- Paracotis hyrax Townsend, 1952

= Zeuctoboarmia hyrax =

Species of moth

Zeuctoboarmia hyrax, is a species of moth of the family Geometridae. It is found in the Afrotropical realm, where it has been recorded from Gambia, Ghana, Kenya, Malawi, Mali, Sierra Leone, South Africa, Sudan, Tanzania, Yemen and Zimbabwe. The larvae feed on the pepper-tree Schinus molle.
