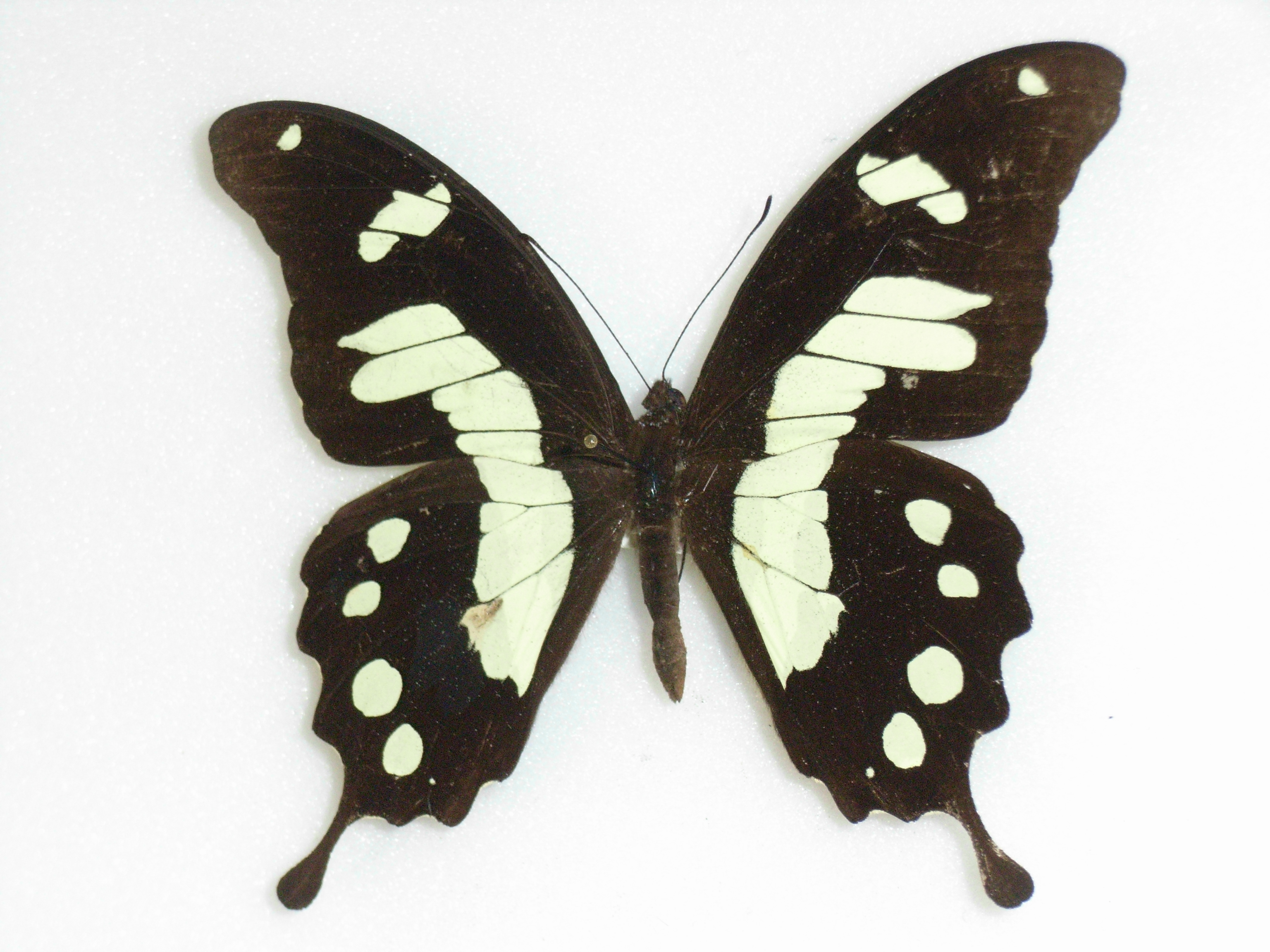

Scientific classification
- Kingdom: Animalia
- Phylum: Arthropoda
- Clade: Pancrustacea
- Class: Insecta
- Order: Lepidoptera
- Family: Papilionidae
- Genus: Papilio
- Species: P. horribilis

Binomial name
- Papilio horribilis Butler, 1874

Synonyms
- Papilio hermes Boullet & Le Cerf, 1912; Papilio hermes var. pellax Boullet & Le Cerf, 1912

= Papilio horribilis =

Species of butterfly

Papilio horribilis is a butterfly of the family Papilionidae. It is found in southern Guinea, Sierra Leone, Liberia, Ivory Coast, and Ghana.

== Description ==
Sexual dimorphism is weak. On the obverse, the wings are black. The forewings have a large white macula crossed by black veins, a smaller macula of the same colour above the cell and a small macula at the apex of the wing. The hindwings have slightly spatulate tails. They have a white band crossed by black veins, four rounded submarginal maculae of the same color (which distinguishes it from Papilio hesperus ), as well as a small orange dot in the anal angle.

On the reverse side the wings are dark brown. The pattern on the forewings is similar but the wings are paler at the apex. The cream band on the hindwings is partly covered with brown. The orange dot on the anal angle is absent and the submarginal macules are almost obliterated

Torben Larsen developed a species numbering system for his 2005 publication Butterflies of West Africa. This species is #7. The 'Larsen' numbers have since been used with permission in A Sharp Eye on Butterflies of Ghana.

== Biology ==
The larvae possibly feed on Beilschmiedia manni. The female lays her eggs on the host plant. . The caterpillar passes through five instars before transforming into a chrysalis, and the chrysalis is held upside down by a silk belt, as in closely related species.

Adults are not uncommon in suitable habitat. Flight is rapid, with males diving from the canopy and moving between the canopy and ground level, often visiting flowers such as those of Mussaenda . They are territorial and fly high in clearings, chasing away rival males, between 10am and 12pm

== Taxonomy ==
Papilio horribilis is a member of the hesperus species group. The members of the clade are:

- Papilio hesperus Westwood, 1843
- Papilio euphranor Trimen, 1868
- Papilio horribilis Butler, 1874
- Papilio pelodurus Butler, 1896

== Status ==
The butterfly is not uncommon and not threatened.

== See also ==
- Mount Nimba Strict Nature Reserve
