= Scythris pelinaula =

Scientific classification
- Kingdom: Animalia
- Phylum: Arthropoda
- Clade: Pancrustacea
- Class: Insecta
- Order: Lepidoptera
- Family: Scythrididae
- Genus: Scythris
- Species: S. pelinaula

Binomial name
- Scythris pelinaula Meyrick, 1916

Species of moth

Scythris pelinaula is a species of moth in the family Scythrididae. It was described by Edward Meyrick in 1916 and has a widespread distribution across the Afrotropical realm.
