= Maliarpha concinnella =

Scientific classification
- Domain: Eukaryota
- Kingdom: Animalia
- Phylum: Arthropoda
- Class: Insecta
- Order: Lepidoptera
- Family: Pyralidae
- Genus: Maliarpha
- Species: M. concinnella

Binomial name
- Maliarpha concinnella (Ragonot, 1888)

Synonyms
- Biafra concinnella Ragonot, 1888; Biafra rhodinella Ragonot, 1888; Biafra taxiarcha Meyrick, 1935; Ethiotropa pyromerella Hampson, 1918; Singhalia haemocharis Meyrick, 1937

Species of moth

Maliarpha concinnella, the pure veneer, is a species of snout moth in the genus Maliarpha. It was described by Ragonot in 1888, and is known from Mali, Ghana, Rwanda, the Democratic Republic of the Congo and South Africa.
