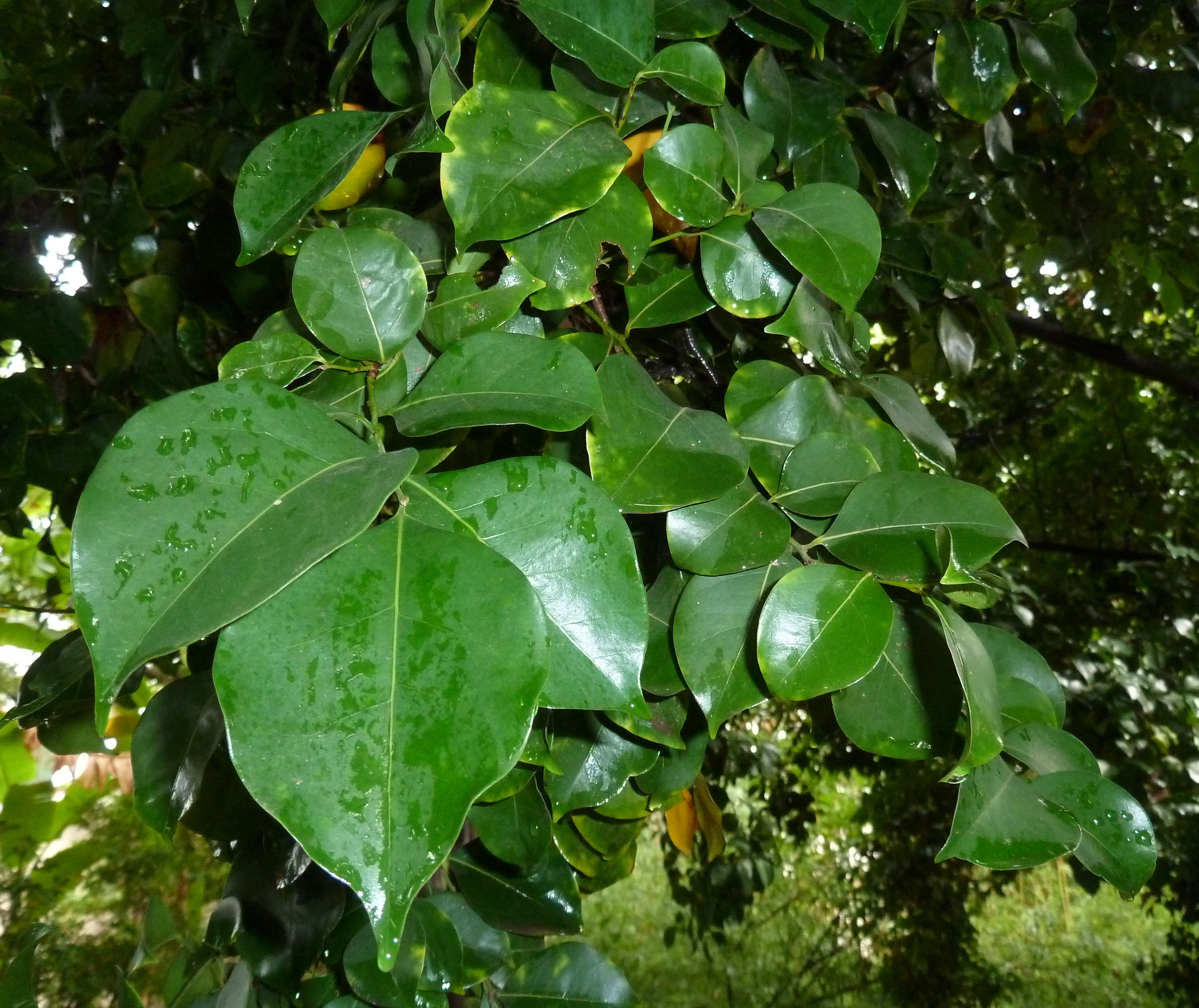

Conservation status
- Least Concern (IUCN 3.1)

Scientific classification
- Kingdom: Plantae
- Clade: Tracheophytes
- Clade: Angiosperms
- Clade: Magnoliids
- Order: Laurales
- Family: Lauraceae
- Genus: Cryptocarya
- Species: C. woodii

Binomial name
- Cryptocarya woodii Engl.

= Cryptocarya woodii =

Species of tree

Cryptocarya woodii, the Cape quince, is a shrub or small forest tree native to Mozambique, Eswatini, and the Cape Provinces, Northern Provinces, and KwaZulu-Natal in South Africa. From mid-summer, the tree bears small, inconspicuous flowers. The ripe fruit have a bumpy surface and a shiny, purple-black color. The leaf veins reveal minute secretory glands(areolae) when held against the light. The larvae of Papilio euphranor and Charaxes xiphares feeds on the tree foliage.

The species was described by Adolf Engler in 1889. Its Latin name honors John Medley Wood, a botanist in Natal.
