= List of moths of Nigeria =

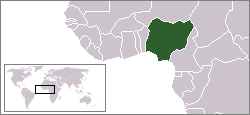
Location of Nigeria

There are about 1400 known moth species of Nigeria. The moths (mostly nocturnal) and butterflies (mostly diurnal) together make up the taxonomic order Lepidoptera.

This is a list of moth species which have been recorded from Nigeria.

== Anomoeotidae ==
- Staphylinochrous pygmaea Bethune-Baker, 1911
- Staphylinochrous whytei Butler, 1894

== Arctiidae ==
- Acantharctia metaleuca Hampson, 1901
- Acantharctia mundata (Walker, 1865)
- Acantharctia nivea Aurivillius, 1900
- Acanthofrontia anacantha Hampson, 1914
- Afraloa bifurca (Walker, 1855)
- Afrasura dubitabilis Durante, 2009
- Afrasura emma Durante, 2009
- Afrasura hieroglyphica (Bethune-Baker, 1911)
- Afrasura indecisa (Walker, 1869)
- Afrasura numida (Holland, 1893)
- Afrasura obliterata (Walker, 1864)
- Afrasura rivulosa (Walker, 1854)
- Afroarctia sjostedti (Aurivillius, 1900)
- Afrospilarctia flavida (Bartel, 1903)
- Afrowatsonius marginalis (Walker, 1855)
- Aloa moloneyi (Druce, 1887)
- Alpenus affiniola (Strand, 1919)
- Alpenus intacta (Hampson, 1916)
- Alpenus investigatorum (Karsch, 1898)
- Alpenus maculosa (Stoll, 1781)
- Alpenus microsticta (Hampson, 1920)
- Alpenus nigropunctata (Bethune-Baker, 1908)
- Alpenus thomasi Watson, 1988
- Amata borguensis (Hampson, 1901)
- Amata interniplaga (Mabille, 1890)
- Amata lagosensis (Hampson, 1907)
- Amata tritonia (Hampson, 1911)
- Amerila brunnea (Hampson, 1901)
- Amerila castanea (Hampson, 1911)
- Amerila fennia (Druce, 1887)
- Amerila luteibarba (Hampson, 1901)
- Amerila metasarca (Hampson, 1911)
- Amerila nigroapicalis (Aurivillius, 1900)
- Amerila niveivitrea (Bartel, 1903)
- Amerila pannosa (Grünberg, 1908)
- Amerila puella (Fabricius, 1793)
- Amerila roseomarginata (Rothschild, 1910)
- Amerila rothi (Rothschild, 1910)
- Amerila vidua (Cramer, 1780)
- Amerila vitrea Plötz, 1880
- Amphicallia pactolicus (Butler, 1888)
- Amsacta bicoloria (Gaede, 1916)
- Amsacta latimarginalis Rothschild, 1933
- Amsacta marginalis Walker, 1855
- Anapisa lamborni (Rothschild, 1913)
- Anapisa monotica (Holland, 1893)
- Archilema cinderella (Kiriakoff, 1958)
- Archilema subumbrata (Holland, 1893)
- Archilema uelleburgensis (Strand, 1912)
- Archilema vilis Birket-Smith, 1965
- Archithosia costimacula (Mabille, 1878)
- Archithosia duplicata Birket-Smith, 1965
- Archithosia flavifrontella (Strand, 1912)
- Archithosia makomensis (Strand, 1912)
- Argina amanda (Boisduval, 1847)
- Argina leonina (Walker, 1865)
- Balacra batesi Druce, 1910
- Balacra daphaena (Hampson, 1898)
- Balacra ehrmanni (Holland, 1893)
- Balacra flavimacula Walker, 1856
- Balacra herona (Druce, 1887)
- Balacra humphreyi Rothschild, 1912
- Balacra preussi (Aurivillius, 1904)
- Balacra pulchra Aurivillius, 1892
- Balacra rubricincta Holland, 1893
- Binna penicillata Walker, 1865
- Binna scita (Walker, 1865)
- Caripodia albescens (Hampson, 1907)
- Caryatis hersilia Druce, 1887
- Caryatis phileta (Drury, 1782)
- Caryatis syntomina Butler, 1878
- Cragia distigmata (Hampson, 1901)
- Creatonotos leucanioides Holland, 1893
- Creatonotos punctivitta (Walker, 1854)
- Crocosia phaeocraspis Hampson, 1914
- Cyana flammeostrigata Karisch, 2003
- Cyana rubritermina (Bethune-Baker, 1911)
- Disparctia vittata (Druce, 1898)
- Eilema albidula (Walker, 1864)
- Eilema leia (Hampson, 1901)
- Eilema mesosticta Hampson, 1911
- Eilema minutissima Bethune-Baker, 1911
- Epilacydes scita (Walker, 1865)
- Epitoxis borguensis Hampson, 1901
- Estigmene rothi Rothschild, 1910
- Estigmene unilinea Rothschild, 1910
- Euchromia guineensis (Fabricius, 1775)
- Euchromia lethe (Fabricius, 1775)
- Logunovium nigricosta (Holland, 1893)
- Logunovium scortillum Wallengren, 1875
- Meganaclia sippia (Plötz, 1880)
- Melisa diptera (Walker, 1854)
- Metarctia didyma Kiriakoff, 1957
- Metarctia flavivena Hampson, 1901
- Metarctia haematica Holland, 1893
- Metarctia johanna (Kiriakoff, 1979)
- Micralarctia punctulatum (Wallengren, 1860)
- Muxta xanthopa (Holland, 1893)
- Nanna ceratopygia Birket-Smith, 1965
- Nanna diplisticta (Bethune-Baker, 1911)
- Nanna eningae (Plötz, 1880)
- Neuroxena fulleri (Druce, 1883)
- Neuroxena funereus (Rothschild, 1933)
- Neuroxena medioflavus (Rothschild, 1935)
- Neuroxena obscurascens (Strand, 1909)
- Nyctemera acraeina Druce, 1882
- Nyctemera apicalis (Walker, 1854)
- Nyctemera itokina (Aurivillius, 1904)
- Nyctemera restrictum (Butler, 1894)
- Nyctemera xanthura (Plötz, 1880)
- Ovenna guineacola (Strand, 1912)
- Ovenna simplex Birket-Smith, 1965
- Ovenna subgriseola (Strand, 1912)
- Ovenna vicaria (Walker, 1854)
- Paralpenus flavizonata (Hampson, 1911)
- Phryganopsis asperatella (Walker, 1864)
- Phryganopsis cinerella (Wallengren, 1860)
- Poliosia nigrifrons Hampson, 1900
- Pseudothyretes perpusilla (Walker, 1856)
- Pusiola aureola Birket-Smith, 1965
- Pusiola celida (Bethune-Baker, 1911)
- Pusiola minutissima (Kiriakoff, 1958)
- Radiarctia lutescens (Walker, 1854)
- Rhipidarctia conradti (Oberthür, 1911)
- Rhipidarctia invaria (Walker, 1856)
- Rhipidarctia postrosea (Rothschild, 1913)
- Siccia conformis Hampson, 1914
- Spilosoma aurantiaca (Holland, 1893)
- Spilosoma batesi (Rothschild, 1910)
- Spilosoma buryi (Rothschild, 1910)
- Spilosoma castelli Rothschild, 1933
- Spilosoma crossi (Rothschild, 1910)
- Spilosoma curvilinea Walker, 1855
- Spilosoma holoxantha (Hampson, 1907)
- Spilosoma immaculata Bartel, 1903
- Spilosoma karschi Bartel, 1903
- Spilosoma metaleuca (Hampson, 1905)
- Spilosoma occidens (Rothschild, 1910)
- Spilosoma rava (Druce, 1898)
- Spilosoma sinefascia (Hampson, 1916)
- Spilosoma togoensis Bartel, 1903
- Stenarctia griseipennis Hampson, 1911
- Stenarctia rothi Rothschild, 1933
- Teracotona buryi Rothschild, 1910
- Tesma nigrapex (Strand, 1912)
- Trichaeta schultzei Aurivillius, 1905
- Utetheisa pulchella (Linnaeus, 1758)
- Yelva obscura Birket-Smith, 1965
- Zobida trinitas (Strand, 1912)

== Bombycidae ==
- Ocinara ficicola (Westwood & Ormerod, 1889)

== Brahmaeidae ==
- Dactyloceras swanzii (Butler, 1871)

== Choreutidae ==
- Brenthia octogemmifera Walsingham, 1897
- Choreutis inspirata Meyrick, 1916

== Cosmopterigidae ==
- Gisilia sclerodes (Meyrick, 1909)

== Cossidae ==
- Azygophleps albovittata Bethune-Baker, 1908
- Azygophleps inclusa (Walker, 1856)
- Azygophleps melanonephele Hampson, 1910
- Eulophonotus myrmeleon Felder, 1874
- Phragmataecia fuscifusa Hampson, 1910
- Phragmataecia sericeata Hampson, 1910
- Phragmataecia pelostema (Hering, 1923)
- Xyleutes biatra (Hampson, 1910)
- Xyleutes polioplaga (Hampson, 1910)

== Crambidae ==
- Adelpherupa flavescens Hampson, 1919
- Aethaloessa floridalis (Zeller, 1852)
- Ancylolomia chrysargyria Hampson, 1919
- Ancylolomia holochrea Hampson, 1919
- Ancylolomia irrorata Hampson, 1919
- Ancylolomia ophiralis Hampson, 1919
- Bissetia poliella (Hampson, 1919)
- Bocchoris labarinthalis Hampson, 1912
- Cadarena sinuata (Fabricius, 1781)
- Calamotropha diodonta (Hampson, 1919)
- Charltona actinialis Hampson, 1919
- Charltona albimixtalis Hampson, 1919
- Charltona interstitalis Hampson, 1919
- Chilo costifusalis (Hampson, 1919)
- Chilo mesoplagalis (Hampson, 1919)
- Chilo perfusalis (Hampson, 1919)
- Chilo psammathis (Hampson, 1919)
- Cirrhochrista grabczewskyi E. Hering, 1903
- Cnaphalocrocis poeyalis (Boisduval, 1833)
- Coniesta ignefusalis (Hampson, 1919)
- Conotalis aurantifascia (Hampson, 1895)
- Cotachena smaragdina (Butler, 1875)
- Crambus mesombrellus Hampson, 1919
- Desmia incomposita (Bethune-Baker, 1909)
- Dichocrocis xanthoplagalis Hampson, 1912
- Diploptalis metallescens Hampson, 1919
- Filodes normalis Hampson, 1912
- Haimbachia proalbivenalis (Błeszyński, 1961)
- Heliothela ophideresana (Walker, 1863)
- Hyalea africalis Hampson, 1912
- Lamprosema acyperalis (Hampson, 1912)
- Mesolia albimaculalis Hampson, 1919
- Mesolia microdontalis (Hampson, 1919)
- Metasia arida Hampson, 1913
- Metasia perirrorata Hampson, 1913
- Mimudea ignitalis (Hampson, 1913)
- Mimudea xanthographa (Hampson, 1913)
- Nosophora trogobasalis (Hampson, 1912)
- Obtusipalpis brunneata Hampson, 1919
- Omiodes indicata (Fabricius, 1775)
- Ostrinia erythrialis (Hampson, 1913)
- Paratraea plumbipicta Hampson, 1919
- Parerupa bipunctalis (Hampson, 1919)
- Parerupa distictalis (Hampson, 1919)
- Patissa fulvicepsalis Hampson, 1919
- Patissa monostidzalis Hampson, 1919
- Phostria tetrastictalis (Hampson, 1912)
- Pilocrocis cuprealis Hampson, 1912
- Prionapteryx rubricalis Hampson, 1919
- Prionotalis peracutella Hampson, 1919
- Prochoristis calamochroa (Hampson, 1919)
- Pseudocatharylla argenticilia (Hampson, 1919)
- Pseudocatharylla peralbellus (Hampson, 1919)
- Pseudonoorda distigmalis (Hampson, 1913)
- Pycnarmon sexpunctalis (Hampson, 1912)
- Pyrausta melanocera Hampson, 1913
- Spoladea recurvalis (Fabricius, 1775)
- Sufetula nigrescens Hampson, 1912
- Sufetula sufetuloides (Hampson, 1919)
- Ulopeza conigeralis Zeller, 1852
- Ulopeza nigricostata Hampson, 1912

== Drepanidae ==
- Callidrepana amaura (Warren, 1901)
- Callidrepana macnultyi Watson, 1965
- Callidrepana serena Watson, 1965
- Epicampoptera pallida (Tams, 1925)
- Epicampoptera strandi Bryk, 1913
- Gonoreta contracta (Warren, 1897)
- Gonoreta cymba Watson, 1965
- Gonoreta gonioptera (Hampson, 1914)
- Gonoreta opacifinis Watson, 1965
- Isospidia angustipennis (Warren, 1904)
- Negera confusa Walker, 1855
- Negera disspinosa Watson, 1965
- Negera natalensis (Felder, 1874)
- Spidia excentrica Strand, 1912
- Spidia fenestrata Butler, 1878
- Spidia inangulata Watson, 1965
- Spidia subviridis (Warren, 1899)
- Uranometra oculata (Holland, 1893)

== Eupterotidae ==
- Acrojana salmonea Rothschild, 1932
- Drepanojana fasciata Aurivillius, 1893
- Jana aurivilliusi Rothschild, 1917
- Phiala cunina Cramer, 1780
- Stenoglene bipartita (Rothschild, 1917)
- Stenoglene citrinus (Druce, 1886)
- Stenoglene roseus (Druce, 1886)
- Vianga magnifica (Rothschild, 1917)

== Gelechiidae ==
- Pectinophora gossypiella (Saunders, 1844)
- Ptilothyris purpurea Walsingham, 1897
- Theatrocopia roseoviridis Walsingham, 1897

== Geometridae ==
- Acrostatheusis apicitincta Prout, 1915
- Agathia elenaria Swinhoe, 1904
- Agathia multiscripta Warren, 1898
- Agathia pauper Warren, 1904
- Aletis helcita (Linnaeus, 1763)
- Aletis vicina Gaede, 1917
- Androzeugma tenuis (Warren, 1898)
- Anoectomychus pudens (Swinhoe, 1904)
- Antharmostes marginata (Warren, 1897)
- Antharmostes mesoleuca Warren, 1899
- Antitrygodes dysmorpha Prout, 1915
- Apatadelpha biocellaria (Walker, 1863)
- Aplochlora invisibilis Warren, 1897
- Archichlora devoluta (Walker, 1861)
- Archichlora marcescens Warren, 1904
- Archichlora marginata (Warren, 1902)
- Archichlora pulveriplaga (Warren, 1898)
- Archichlora viridimacula Warren, 1898
- Azyx consocia (Warren, 1899)
- Bathycolpodes acoelopa Prout, 1912
- Bathycolpodes excavata (Warren, 1898)
- Bathycolpodes subfuscata (Warren, 1902)
- Bathycolpodes vegeta Prout, 1912
- Biston abruptaria (Walker, 1869)
- Biston antecreta (Prout, 1938)
- Biston subocularia (Mabille, 1893)
- Cabera glabra (Warren, 1904)
- Cartaletis forbesi (Druce, 1884)
- Chiasmia albivia (Prout, 1915)
- Chiasmia conturbata (Warren, 1898)
- Chiasmia fulvisparsa (Warren, 1897)
- Chiasmia impar (Warren, 1897)
- Chiasmia majestica (Warren, 1901)
- Chiasmia nana (Warren, 1898)
- Chiasmia normata (Walker, 1861)
- Chiasmia ostentosaria (Möschler, 1887)
- Chiasmia streniata (Guenée, 1858)
- Chiasmia trirecurvata (Saalmüller, 1891)
- Chiasmia umbrata (Warren, 1897)
- Chloroclystis consobrina (Warren, 1901)
- Chloroctenis similis Warren, 1899
- Chlorodrepana rothi Warren, 1899
- Chorodnodes rothi Warren, 1897
- Chrysocraspeda hilaris (Warren, 1898)
- Chrysocraspeda rosina Warren, 1898
- Chrysocraspeda rubripennis (Warren, 1898)
- Cleora cnephaea Prout, 1915
- Cleora derogaria (Snellen, 1872)
- Cleora inelegans (Warren, 1905)
- Coenina aurivena Butler, 1898
- Colocleora divisaria (Walker, 1860)
- Colocleora expansa (Warren, 1899)
- Colocleora smithi (Warren, 1904)
- Colocleora spuria (Prout, 1915)
- Comibaena esmeralda (Warren, 1898)
- Comibaena flavitaenia (Warren, 1898)
- Comibaena longipennis (Warren, 1904)
- Comostolopsis rubristicta (Warren, 1899)
- Ctenoberta dubia (Warren, 1899)
- Cyclophora dewitzi (Prout, 1920)
- Cyclophora hirtifemur (Prout, 1932)
- Cyclophora leonaria (Walker, 1861)
- Cyclophora misella (Prout, 1932)
- Cyclophora poeciloptera (Prout, 1920)
- Dithecodes ornithospila (Prout, 1911)
- Ectropis nigripunctata Warren, 1897
- Ectropis subapicata (Warren, 1904)
- Eois grataria (Walker, 1861)
- Epigynopteryx nigricola (Warren, 1897)
- Epigynopteryx straminea (Warren, 1897)
- Eucrostes disparata Walker, 1861
- Euproutia aggravaria (Guenée, 1858)
- Euproutia vernicoma (Prout, 1913)
- Exeliopsis ansorgei (Warren, 1905)
- Gelasmodes fasciata (Warren, 1899)
- Geodena auridisca (Warren, 1904)
- Geodena marginalis Walker, 1856
- Geodena quadrigutta Walker, 1856
- Geodena suffusa Swinhoe, 1904
- Geodena surrendra Swinhoe, 1904
- Geodena venata Prout, 1915
- Gymnoscelis tenera Warren, 1901
- Heterocrita bidentata (Bethune-Baker, 1913)
- Heterorachis carpenteri Prout, 1915
- Heterostegane flavata (Warren, 1905)
- Hyalornis docta (Schaus & Clements, 1893)
- Hylemeridia majuscula Prout, 1915
- Hypocoela subfulva Warren, 1897
- Hypocoela turpisaria (Swinhoe, 1904)
- Hypomecis intrusilinea (Prout, 1915)
- Idaea pulveraria (Snellen, 1872)
- Idaea rufimixta (Warren, 1901)
- Idaea submaculata (Warren, 1898)
- Isturgia catalaunaria (Guenée, 1858)
- Isturgia disputaria (Guenée, 1858)
- Lathochlora inornata Warren, 1900
- Lophorrhachia palliata (Warren, 1898)
- Lophorrhachia rubricorpus (Warren, 1898)
- Luxiaria ansorgei (Warren, 1903)
- Luxiaria curvivena (Warren, 1899)
- Melinoessa amplissimata (Walker, 1863)
- Melinoessa aureola Prout, 1934
- Melinoessa palumbata (Warren, 1894)
- Melinoessa perlimbata (Guenée, 1857)
- Melinoessa stellata (Butler, 1878)
- Melinoessa stramineata (Walker, 1869)
- Mesocolpia marmorata (Warren, 1899)
- Miantochora incolorata Warren, 1899
- Miantochora rufaria (Swinhoe, 1904)
- Mixocera albimargo Warren, 1901
- Narthecusa tenuiorata Walker, 1862
- Neostega flaviguttata Warren, 1903
- Omphacodes minima Prout, 1913
- Omphalucha brunnea (Warren, 1899)
- Omphax rubriceps (Warren, 1904)
- Paraptychodes costimaculata Prout, 1913
- Perithalera oblongata (Warren, 1898)
- Phaiogramma faustinata (Millière, 1868)
- Pitthea continua Walker, 1854
- Pitthea famula Drury, 1773
- Plegapteryx anomalus Herrich-Schäffer, 1856
- Plegapteryx sphingata (Warren, 1895)
- Prasinocyma congrua (Walker, 1869)
- Prasinocyma gemmatimargo Prout, 1915
- Prasinocyma pulchraria Swinhoe, 1904
- Pycnostega fumosa (Warren, 1897)
- Pycnostega obscura Warren, 1905
- Racotis squalida (Butler, 1878)
- Racotis zebrina Warren, 1899
- Rhodometra sacraria (Linnaeus, 1767)
- Rhodophthitus myriostictus Prout, 1915
- Scopula aphercta Prout, 1932
- Scopula elegans (Prout, 1915)
- Scopula euphemia Prout, 1920
- Scopula flavissima (Warren, 1898)
- Scopula habilis (Warren, 1899)
- Scopula haemaleata (Warren, 1898)
- Scopula inscriptata (Walker, 1863)
- Scopula jejuna Prout, 1932
- Scopula lactaria (Walker, 1861)
- Scopula minorata (Boisduval, 1833)
- Scopula ossicolor (Warren, 1897)
- Scopula plionocentra Prout, 1920
- Scopula proterocelis Prout, 1920
- Scopula pyraliata (Warren, 1898)
- Scopula serena Prout, 1920
- Scopula subperlaria (Warren, 1897)
- Scopula supina Prout, 1920
- Scopula transsecta (Warren, 1898)
- Somatina irregularis (Warren, 1898)
- Somatina probleptica Prout, 1917
- Sphingomima heterodoxa Warren, 1899
- Terina charmione (Fabricius, 1793)
- Terina doleris (Plötz, 1880)
- Thalassodes opaca Warren, 1898
- Thalassodes quadraria Guenée, 1857
- Thalassodes unicolor Warren, 1902
- Traminda obversata (Walker, 1861)
- Unnamed Ennominae genus ansorgeata (Warren, 1903)
- Unnamed Ennominae genus rufigrisea (Warren, 1900)
- Vaena eacleoides Walker, 1869
- Victoria perornata Warren, 1898
- Xanthisthisa brunnea (Warren, 1899)
- Xanthorhoe euthytoma Prout, 1926
- Xenimpia conformis (Warren, 1898)
- Xenimpia informis (Swinhoe, 1904)
- Xenochroma palimpais Prout, 1934
- Xenostega tincta Warren, 1899
- Xenostega tyana Swinhoe, 1904
- Zamarada acosmeta Prout, 1921
- Zamarada acrochra Prout, 1928
- Zamarada adumbrata D. S. Fletcher, 1974
- Zamarada aerata D. S. Fletcher, 1974
- Zamarada aglae Oberthür, 1912
- Zamarada anacantha D. S. Fletcher, 1974
- Zamarada antimima D. S. Fletcher, 1974
- Zamarada auratisquama Warren, 1897
- Zamarada bastelbergeri Gaede, 1915
- Zamarada bicuspida D. S. Fletcher, 1974
- Zamarada catori Bethune-Baker, 1913
- Zamarada chrysothyra Hampson, 1909
- Zamarada corroborata Herbulot, 1954
- Zamarada crystallophana Mabille, 1900
- Zamarada cucharita D. S. Fletcher, 1974
- Zamarada dentigera Warren, 1909
- Zamarada dialitha D. S. Fletcher, 1974
- Zamarada dilucida Warren, 1909
- Zamarada dolorosa D. S. Fletcher, 1974
- Zamarada episema D. S. Fletcher, 1974
- Zamarada euerces Prout, 1928
- Zamarada euphrosyne Oberthür, 1912
- Zamarada excavata Bethune-Baker, 1913
- Zamarada flavicosta Warren, 1897
- Zamarada fumosa Gaede, 1915
- Zamarada griseola D. S. Fletcher, 1974
- Zamarada hero D. S. Fletcher, 1974
- Zamarada ignicosta Prout, 1912
- Zamarada ilaria Swinhoe, 1904
- Zamarada intacta Herbulot, 1979
- Zamarada ixiaria Swinhoe, 1904
- Zamarada labifera Prout, 1915
- Zamarada latimargo Warren, 1897
- Zamarada lepta D. S. Fletcher, 1974
- Zamarada longidens D. S. Fletcher, 1963
- Zamarada melanopyga Herbulot, 1954
- Zamarada melasma D. S. Fletcher, 1974
- Zamarada melpomene Oberthür, 1912
- Zamarada mimesis D. S. Fletcher, 1974
- Zamarada nasuta Warren, 1897
- Zamarada opala Carcasson, 1964
- Zamarada paxilla D. S. Fletcher, 1974
- Zamarada perlepidata (Walker, 1863)
- Zamarada phoenopasta D. S. Fletcher, 1974
- Zamarada phrontisaria Swinhoe, 1904
- Zamarada pinheyi D. S. Fletcher, 1956
- Zamarada polyctemon Prout, 1932
- Zamarada protrusa Warren, 1897
- Zamarada reflexaria (Walker, 1863)
- Zamarada regularis D. S. Fletcher, 1974
- Zamarada sagitta D. S. Fletcher, 1974
- Zamarada schalida D. S. Fletcher, 1974
- Zamarada sicula D. S. Fletcher, 1974
- Zamarada sinecalcarata D. S. Fletcher, 1974
- Zamarada subincolaris Gaede, 1915
- Zamarada subinterrupta Gaede, 1915
- Zamarada suda D. S. Fletcher, 1974
- Zamarada terpsichore Oberthür, 1912
- Zamarada tortura D. S. Fletcher, 1974
- Zamarada triangularis Gaede, 1915
- Zamarada undimarginata Warren, 1897
- Zamarada urania Oberthür, 1912
- Zamarada vulpina Warren, 1897
- Zamarada xyele D. S. Fletcher, 1974
- Zeuctoboarmia pectinata (Warren, 1897)
- Zeuctoboarmia sabinei (Prout, 1915)

== Gracillariidae ==
- Acrocercops bifasciata (Walsingham, 1891)
- Acrocercops fuscapica Bland, 1980
- Acrocercops pectinivalva Bland, 1980
- Acrocercops rhothiastis Meyrick, 1921
- Aristaea onychota (Meyrick, 1908)
- Caloptilia fera Triberti, 1989
- Caloptilia insolita Triberti, 1989
- Caloptilia isotoma (Meyrick, 1914)
- Caloptilia leptophanes (Meyrick, 1928)
- Caloptilia maynei Ghesquière, 1940
- Caloptilia pentaplaca (Meyrick, 1911)
- Caloptilia prosticta (Meyrick, 1909)
- Caloptilia pseudoaurita Triberti, 1989
- Corythoxestis aletreuta (Meyrick, 1936)
- Ectropina sclerochitoni Vári, 1961
- Ectropina suttoni (Bland, 1980)
- Lamprolectica apicistrigata (Walsingham, 1891)
- Phyllocnistis citrella Stainton, 1856
- Phyllonorycter caudasimplex Bland, 1980
- Spulerina quadrifasciata Bland, 1980
- Stomphastis adesa Triberti, 1988
- Stomphastis conflua (Meyrick, 1914)
- Stomphastis thraustica (Meyrick, 1908)

== Himantopteridae ==
- Pedoptila catori Bethune-Baker, 1911

== Lasiocampidae ==
- Cheligium lineatum (Aurivillius, 1893)
- Chrysopsyche albicilia Bethune-Baker, 1911
- Chrysopsyche imparilis Aurivillius, 1905
- Chrysopsyche mirifica (Butler, 1878)
- Cleopatrina bilinea (Walker, 1855)
- Euphorea ondulosa (Conte, 1909)
- Euwallengrenia reducta (Walker, 1855)
- Filiola occidentale (Strand, 1912)
- Gastroplakaeis idakum Bethune-Baker, 1913
- Gelo anastella Zolotuhin & Prozorov, 2010
- Gonometa christyi Sharpe, 1902
- Grellada imitans (Aurivillius, 1893)
- Hariola haigi (Tams, 1935)
- Hypotrabala castanea Holland, 1893
- Leipoxais dives Aurivillius, 1915
- Leipoxais humfreyi Aurivillius, 1915
- Leipoxais marginepunctata Holland, 1893
- Leipoxais peraffinis Holland, 1893
- Mallocampa audea (Druce, 1887)
- Mimopacha cinerascens (Holland, 1893)
- Mimopacha gerstaeckerii (Dewitz, 1881)
- Mimopacha tripunctata (Aurivillius, 1905)
- Morongea cruenta Zolotuhin & Prozorov, 2010
- Morongea mastodont Zolotuhin & Prozorov, 2010
- Odontocheilopteryx maculata Aurivillius, 1905
- Opisthodontia afroio Zolotuhin & Prozorov, 2010
- Opisthodontia axividia Zolotuhin & Prozorov, 2010
- Opisthodontia pygmy Zolotuhin & Prozorov, 2010
- Pachymeta contraria (Walker, 1855)
- Pachymetana lamborni (Aurivillius, 1915)
- Pachyna subfascia (Walker, 1855)
- Pachytrina elygara Zolotuhin & Gurkovich, 2009
- Pachytrina gliharta Zolotuhin & Gurkovich, 2009
- Pachytrina regeria Zolotuhin & Gurkovich, 2009
- Pallastica lateritia (Hering, 1928)
- Pallastica mesoleuca (Strand, 1911)
- Philotherma sordida Aurivillius, 1905
- Pseudometa choba (Druce, 1899)
- Pseudometa patagiata Aurivillius, 1905
- Pseudometa tenebra (Bethune-Baker, 1911)
- Sena punctulata (Aurivillius, 1914)
- Streblote splendens (Druce, 1887)
- Theophasida cardinalli (Tams, 1926)
- Trabala burchardii (Dewitz, 1881)
- Trabala lambourni Bethune-Baker, 1911

== Limacodidae ==
- Altha ansorgei Bethune-Baker, 1911
- Altha rubrifusalis Hampson, 1910
- Baria elsa (Druce, 1887)
- Casphalia citrimaculata Aurivillius, 1905
- Chrysopoloma citrina Druce, 1886
- Gavara lamborni (Bethune-Baker, 1915)
- Hadraphe aprica Karsch, 1899
- Latoia colini Mabille, 1881
- Latoia loxotoma (Bethune-Baker, 1911)
- Latoia urda (Druce, 1887)
- Macroplectra fuscifusa Hampson, 1910
- Macroplectra obliquilinea Hampson, 1910
- Micraphe lateritia Karsch, 1896
- Miresa strigivena Hampson, 1910
- Narosa albescens West, 1940
- Narosana agbaja Bethune-Baker, 1915
- Parasa carnapi Karsch, 1899
- Parasa catori Bethune-Baker, 1911
- Parasa dentina Hering, 1932
- Parasa prussi Karsch, 1896
- Parasa serratilinea Bethune-Baker, 1911
- Rhypteira sordida Holland, 1893
- Stroteroides albitibiata West, 1940
- Thosea catori Bethune-Baker, 1908
- Trachyptena agbaja (Bethune-Baker, 1915)
- Trachyptena rufa Bethune-Baker, 1911

== Lymantriidae ==
- Aclonophlebia flaveola Hering, 1926
- Batella acronictoides (Collenette, 1937)
- Batella muscosa (Holland, 1893)
- Bracharoa mixta (Snellen, 1872)
- Conigephyra flava (Bethune-Baker, 1911)
- Conigephyra unipunctata (Möschler, 1887)
- Cropera nigripes (Hampson, 1910)
- Crorema mentiens Walker, 1855
- Crorema setinoides (Holland, 1893)
- Dasychira catori Bethune-Baker, 1911
- Dasychira coeruleifascia (Holland, 1893)
- Dasychira cromptoni Swinhoe, 1903
- Dasychira euproctina (Aurivillius, 1904)
- Dasychira griseinubes Hampson, 1910
- Dasychira hodoepora Collenette, 1960
- Dasychira horrida Swinhoe, 1903
- Dasychira ilesha Collenette, 1931
- Dasychira magnifica Hampson, 1910
- Dasychira melochlora Hering, 1926
- Dasychira obliqua (Bethune-Baker, 1911)
- Dasychira postalba (Swinhoe, 1906)
- Dasychira pulchra Swinhoe, 1906
- Dasychira remota Druce, 1887
- Dasychira strigidentata Bethune-Baker, 1911
- Dasychira umbricolora Hampson, 1910
- Dasychirana crenulata Bethune-Baker, 1911
- Dasychirana unilineata Bethune-Baker, 1911
- Eudasychira anisozyga (Collenette, 1960)
- Eudasychira dina (Hering, 1926)
- Eudasychira georgiana (Fawcett, 1900)
- Eudasychira isozyga (Collenette, 1960)
- Eudasychira macnultyi (Collenette, 1957)
- Eudasychira quinquepunctata Möschler, 1887
- Euproctis aethiopica (Bethune-Baker, 1908)
- Euproctis alba Swinhoe, 1903
- Euproctis ceramozona Collenette, 1931
- Euproctis onii Bethune-Baker, 1911
- Euproctis pygmaea (Walker, 1855)
- Euproctis quadrifascia Bethune-Baker, 1911
- Euproctis tabida (Hering, 1926)
- Euproctis utilis Swinhoe, 1903
- Euproctoides acrisia Plötz, 1880
- Hemerophanes enos (Druce, 1896)
- Heteronygmia manicata (Aurivillius, 1892)
- Hyaloperina nudiuscula Aurivillius, 1904
- Knappetra fasciata (Walker, 1855)
- Lacipa argyroleuca Hampson, 1910
- Lacipa quadripunctata Dewitz, 1881
- Laelia aegra Hering, 1926
- Laelia aethiopica Bethune-Baker, 1908
- Laelia batoides Plötz, 1880
- Laelia fulvicosta Hampson, 1910
- Laelia pheosia (Hampson, 1910)
- Laelia rocana (Swinhoe, 1906)
- Laelia straminea Hampson, 1910
- Leucoma gracillima Holland, 1893
- Leucoma luteipes (Walker, 1855)
- Leucoma ogovensis (Holland, 1893)
- Leucoma parva (Plötz, 1880)
- Leucoma vata Swinhoe, 1903
- Lomadonta saturata Swinhoe, 1904
- Marbla affinis (Hering, 1926)
- Marbla divisa (Walker, 1855)
- Marblepsis flabellaria (Fabricius, 1787)
- Marblepsis nyses (Druce, 1887)
- Naroma signifera Walker, 1856
- Neomardara africana (Holland, 1893)
- Olapa tavetensis (Holland, 1892)
- Opoboa chrysoparala Collenette, 1932
- Opoboa schuetzei Tessmann, 1921
- Otroeda cafra (Drury, 1780)
- Otroeda nerina (Drury, 1780)
- Otroeda vesperina Walker, 1854
- Paraproctis osiris Bethune-Baker, 1911
- Pseudonotodonta virescens (Möschler, 1887)
- Rhypopteryx sordida Aurivillius, 1879
- Stracena flavipectus (Swinhoe, 1903)
- Stracena fuscivena Swinhoe, 1903
- Stracena tottea (Swinhoe, 1903)
- Terphothrix callima (Bethune-Baker, 1911)

== Metarbelidae ==
- Lebedodes bassa (Bethune-Baker, 1908)
- Lebedodes nigeriae Bethune-Baker, 1915
- Melisomimas metallica Hampson, 1914
- Metarbela bifasciata Gaede, 1929
- Metarbela funebris Gaede, 1929
- Moyencharia joeli Lehmann, 2013
- Moyencharia ochreicosta (Gaede, 1929)
- Stenagra multipunctata Hampson, 1920

== Micronoctuidae ==
- Micronola yemeni Fibiger, 2011

== Noctuidae ==
- Abrostola confusa Dufay, 1958
- Aburina phoenocrosmena Hampson, 1926
- Aburina tetragramma Hampson, 1926
- Acanthodelta janata (Linnaeus, 1758)
- Achaea albicilia (Walker, 1858)
- Achaea albifimbria (Walker, 1869)
- Achaea boris (Geyer, 1837)
- Achaea catella Guenée, 1852
- Achaea catocaloides Guenée, 1852
- Achaea echo (Walker, 1858)
- Achaea ezea (Cramer, 1779)
- Achaea faber Holland, 1894
- Achaea finita (Guenée, 1852)
- Achaea indicabilis Walker, 1858
- Achaea intercisa Walker, 1865
- Achaea lienardi (Boisduval, 1833)
- Achaea mormoides Walker, 1858
- Achaea obvia Hampson, 1913
- Achaea thermopera Hampson, 1913
- Achaea xanthodera (Holland, 1894)
- Acontia antica Walker, 1862
- Acontia citrelinea Bethune-Baker, 1911
- Acontia ectorrida (Hampson, 1916)
- Acontia fastrei Hacker, Legrain & Fibiger, 2010
- Acontia gratiosa Wallengren, 1856
- Acontia hemiselenias (Hampson, 1918)
- Acontia imitatrix Wallengren, 1856
- Acontia insocia (Walker, 1857)
- Acontia nigrimacula Hacker, Legrain & Fibiger, 2008
- Acontia sphaerophora (Hampson, 1914)
- Acontia transfigurata Wallengren, 1856
- Acontia vaualbum (Hampson, 1914)
- Acontia veroxanthia Hacker, Legrain & Fibiger, 2010
- Acontia wahlbergi Wallengren, 1856
- Acrapex aenigma (Felder & Rogenhofer, 1874)
- Adisura affinis Rothschild, 1921
- Aegocera anthina Jordan, 1926
- Aegocera humphreyi (Hampson, 1911)
- Aegocera obliqua Mabille, 1893
- Aegocera rectilinea Boisduval, 1836
- Aegocera tigrina (Druce, 1882)
- Aethodes angustipennis Hampson, 1918
- Agoma trimenii (Felder, 1874)
- Agrotis bisignoides Poole, 1989
- Agrotis melamesa Hampson, 1913
- Amazonides rufescens (Hampson, 1913)
- Amyna axis Guenée, 1852
- Androlymnia torsivena (Hampson, 1902)
- Anigraea siccata (Hampson, 1905)
- Anoba microphaea Hampson, 1926
- Anomis endochlora Hampson, 1926
- Anomis microdonta Hampson, 1926
- Anomis pyrocausta Hampson, 1926
- Apaegocera argyrogramma Hampson, 1905
- Araeopteron canescens (Walker, 1865)
- Aspidifrontia berioi Hacker & Hausmann, 2010
- Aspidifrontia hemileuca (Hampson, 1909)
- Aspidifrontia pulverea Hampson, 1913
- Aspidifrontia villiersi (Laporte, 1972)
- Athetis magniplagia (Hampson, 1918)
- Attatha metaleuca Hampson, 1913
- Audea endophaea Hampson, 1913
- Audea humeralis Hampson, 1902
- Audea kathrina Kühne, 2005
- Audea melaleuca Walker, 1865
- Audea paulumnodosa Kühne, 2005
- Autoba brachygonia (Hampson, 1910)
- Avatha ethiopica (Hampson, 1913)
- Avitta insignifica Hampson, 1926
- Avitta ionomesa Hampson, 1926
- Baniana disticta Hampson, 1926
- Bocula ichthyuropis Hampson, 1926
- Bocula sticticraspis Hampson, 1926
- Brevipecten confluens Hampson, 1926
- Brevipecten politzari Hacker & Fibiger, 2007
- Calesia fulviceps Hampson, 1926
- Caligatus angasii Wing, 1850
- Callophisma flavicornis Hampson, 1913
- Callopistria complicata (Holland, 1894)
- Callopistria cyanopera (Hampson, 1911)
- Callopistria maillardi (Guenée, 1862)
- Callopistria nana (Hampson, 1911)
- Callopistria nephrosticta (Hampson, 1908)
- Callopistria nigeriensis (Hampson, 1918)
- Callopistria occidens (Hampson, 1908)
- Callopistria thermochroa (Hampson, 1911)
- Callyna holophaea Hampson, 1911
- Capnodes albicostata Poole, 1989
- Caryonopera triangularis (Bethune-Baker, 1911)
- Catada rex Bethune-Baker, 1911
- Catephia cryptodisca Hampson, 1926
- Catephia holophaea Hampson, 1926
- Catephia microcelis Hampson, 1926
- Cerocala albicornis Berio, 1966
- Cerocala caelata Karsch, 1896
- Chalciope pusilla (Holland, 1894)
- Chasmina tibialis (Fabricius, 1775)
- Chasmina vestae (Guenée, 1852)
- Chrysodeixis acuta (Walker, [1858])
- Claterna gracillodina Hampson, 1926
- Colbusa euclidica Walker, 1865
- Colbusa restricta Hampson, 1918
- Corgatha porphyrea Hampson, 1910
- Crameria amabilis (Drury, 1773)
- Cretonia platyphaeella Walker, 1866
- Crypsotidia maculifera (Staudinger, 1898)
- Crypsotidia mesosema Hampson, 1913
- Crypsotidia parva Rothschild, 1921
- Ctenoplusia dorfmeisteri (Felder & Rogenhofer, 1874)
- Ctenusa pallida (Hampson, 1902)
- Cyligramma latona (Cramer, 1775)
- Cyligramma limacina (Guérin-Méneville, 1832)
- Cyligramma magus (Guérin-Méneville, [1844])
- Cyligramma simplex Grünberg, 1910
- Deinopa lilacina Hampson, 1926
- Diparopsis watersi (Rothschild, 1901)
- Drepanopses rufipicta Hampson, 1926
- Dysgonia angularis (Boisduval, 1833)
- Dysgonia humilis Holland, 1894
- Dysgonia palpalis (Walker, 1865)
- Dysgonia perexcurvata (Hampson, 1918)
- Dysgonia pudica (Möschler, 1887)
- Dysgonia torrida (Guenée, 1852)
- Dysgonia trogosema (Hampson, 1913)
- Egnasia microtype Hampson, 1926
- Egnasia scotopasta Hampson, 1926
- Egnasia trogocraspia Hampson, 1926
- Enispa albipuncta Hampson, 1910
- Enispa atriceps Hampson, 1910
- Enispa lycaugesia Hampson, 1910
- Enmonodiops ochrodiscata Hampson, 1926
- Entomogramma pardus Guenée, 1852
- Episparis fenestrifera Bryk, 1915
- Ercheia subsignata (Walker, 1865)
- Erebus walkeri (Butler, 1875)
- Ethiopica exolivia Hampson, 1911
- Ethiopica melanopa Bethune-Baker, 1911
- Ethiopica polyastra Hampson, 1909
- Euaethiops cyanopasta Hampson, 1926
- Eublemma anachoresis (Wallengren, 1863)
- Eublemma bifasciata (Moore, 1881)
- Eublemma cochylioides (Guenée, 1852)
- Eublemma flaviciliata Hampson, 1910
- Eublemma lacteicosta Hampson, 1910
- Eublemma phaeapera Hampson, 1910
- Eublemma proleuca Hampson, 1910
- Eublemma ragusana (Freyer, 1844)
- Eublemma robertsi Berio, 1969
- Eublemma scotopis Bethune-Baker, 1911
- Eublemma staudingeri (Wallengren, 1875)
- Eudocima divitiosa (Walker, 1869)
- Eudocima materna (Linnaeus, 1767)
- Eudrapa lepraota Hampson, 1926
- Eudrapa metathermeola Hampson, 1926
- Eudrapa mollis Walker, 1857
- Eudrapa olivaria Hampson, 1926
- Euippodes euprepes Hampson, 1926
- Euminucia conflua Hampson, 1913
- Euneophlebia acutissima Berio, 1972
- Eutelia albiluna Hampson, 1905
- Eutelia cautabasis Hampson, 1905
- Eutelia chlorobasis Hampson, 1905
- Eutelia discitriga Walker, 1865
- Eutelia ferridorsata Hampson, 1905
- Eutelia holocausta Hampson, 1905
- Eutelia leucodelta Hampson, 1905
- Eutelia menalcas (Holland, 1894)
- Eutelia metasarca Hampson, 1905
- Eutelia nigridentula Hampson, 1905
- Eutelia ochricostata Hampson, 1905
- Eutelia polychorda Hampson, 1902
- Eutelia porphyriota (Hampson, 1912)
- Eutelia quadriliturata Walker, 1869
- Eutelia snelleni Saalmüller, 1881
- Eutelia subrubens (Mabille, 1890)
- Eutelia violescens (Hampson, 1912)
- Facidia luteilinea Hampson, 1926
- Feliniopsis medleri (Laporte, 1973)
- Feliniopsis nigribarbata (Hampson, 1908)
- Feliniopsis wojtusiaki Hacker & Fibiger, 2007
- Focillopis eclipsia Hampson, 1926
- Fodina oxyprora (Bethune-Baker, 1911)
- Geniascota lacteata Hampson, 1926
- Geniascota trichoptycha Hampson, 1926
- Gesonia obeditalis Walker, 1859
- Gesonia stictigramma Hampson, 1926
- Gracilodes metopis Hampson, 1926
- Gracilodes opisthenops Hampson, 1926
- Grammodes congenita Walker, 1858
- Grammodes geometrica (Fabricius, 1775)
- Grammodes stolida (Fabricius, 1775)
- Helicoverpa assulta (Guenée, 1852)
- Heliophisma catocalina Holland, 1894
- Heliophisma klugii (Boisduval, 1833)
- Heraclia geryon (Fabricius, 1781)
- Heraclia hornimani (Druce, 1880)
- Heraclia longipennis (Walker, 1854)
- Heraclia medeba (Druce, 1880)
- Heraclia pallida (Walker, 1854)
- Heraclia poggei (Dewitz, 1879)
- Heraclia terminatis (Walker, 1856)
- Herpeperas lavendula Hampson, 1926
- Herpeperas phoenopasta Hampson, 1926
- Hollandia spurrelli Hampson, 1926
- Holocryptis melanosticta Hampson, 1910
- Homodina argentifera Hampson, 1926
- Hypena conscitalis Walker, 1866
- Hypena obacerralis Walker, [1859]
- Hypocala deflorata (Fabricius, 1794)
- Hypocala rostrata (Fabricius, 1794)
- Hypopyra capensis Herrich-Schäffer, 1854
- Hyposada melanosticta Hampson, 1910
- Hypotacha isthmigera Wiltshire, 1968
- Hypotuerta transiens (Hampson, 1901)
- Iambia jansei Berio, 1966
- Iambia thwaitesi (Moore, 1885)
- Isadelphina albistellata Hampson, 1926
- Isadelphina cheilosema Hampson, 1926
- Isadelphina rufaria Hampson, 1926
- Isadelphina xylochroa Hampson, 1926
- Leucania fissifascia (Hampson, 1907)
- Leucania insulicola Guenée, 1852
- Leucania miasticta (Hampson, 1918)
- Libystica crenata Hampson, 1926
- Lophoptera litigiosa (Boisduval, 1833)
- Loxioda ectherma Hampson, 1926
- Lycophotia viridis Hampson, 1911
- Macella euritiusalis Walker, 1859
- Macellopis ustata Hampson, 1926
- Marathyssa cuneata (Saalmüller, 1891)
- Marcipa apicalis Hampson, 1926
- Marcipa dimera Hampson, 1926
- Marcipa eucrines (Bethune-Baker, 1911)
- Marcipa molybdea Hampson, 1926
- Marcipa monosema Hampson, 1926
- Marcipa ruptisigna Hampson, 1926
- Masalia albiseriata (Druce, 1903)
- Masalia bimaculata (Moore, 1888)
- Masalia flaviceps (Hampson, 1903)
- Masalia flavistrigata (Hampson, 1903)
- Masalia galatheae (Wallengren, 1856)
- Masalia nubila (Hampson, 1903)
- Masalia rubristria (Hampson, 1903)
- Masalia transvaalica (Distant, 1902)
- Massaga angustifascia Rothschild, 1896
- Massaga hesparia (Cramer, 1775)
- Massaga maritona Butler, 1868
- Massaga virescens Butler, 1874
- Matopo selecta (Walker, 1865)
- Maxera euryptera Hampson, 1926
- Mazuca dulcis Jordan, 1933
- Mazuca strigicincta Walker, 1866
- Mecodina ochrigrapta Hampson, 1926
- Mecodopsis conisema Hampson, 1926
- Medlerana nigeriensis Laporte, 1979
- Melanephia nigrescens (Wallengren, 1856)
- Mesogenea excavata Hampson, 1926
- Mesosciera picta Hampson, 1926
- Mesosciera rubrinotata Hampson, 1926
- Metagarista maenas (Herrich-Schäffer, 1853)
- Metagarista triphaenoides Walker, 1854
- Mimasura clara (Holland, 1893)
- Miniodes discolor Guenée, 1852
- Miniodes phaeosoma Hampson, 1913
- Misa memnonia Karsch, 1895
- Mitrophrys latreillii (Herrich-Schäffer, 1853)
- Mitrophrys menete (Cramer, 1775)
- Mocis frugalis (Fabricius, 1775)
- Mocis mayeri (Boisduval, 1833)
- Mocis mutuaria (Walker, 1858)
- Mocis proverai Zilli, 2000
- Mocis undata (Fabricius, 1775)
- Mythimna atritorna (Hampson, 1911)
- Mythimna natalensis (Butler, 1875)
- Naarda unipunctata Bethune-Baker, 1911
- Nagia evanescens Hampson, 1926
- Nagia microsema Hampson, 1926
- Nephelemorpha semaphora Hampson, 1926
- Niphosticta stigmagrapta Hampson, 1926
- Nyodes brevicornis (Walker, 1857)
- Odontestra goniosema Hampson, 1913
- Oglasa atristipata Hampson, 1926
- Oglasa aulota Hampson, 1926
- Oglasa confluens Hampson, 1926
- Oglasa diagonalis Hampson, 1926
- Oglasa holophaea Hampson, 1926
- Oglasa phaeonephele Hampson, 1926
- Oglasa rufimedia Hampson, 1926
- Oglasa tessellata Hampson, 1926
- Oligia ambigua (Walker, 1858)
- Oligia melanodonta Hampson, 1908
- Ophisma teterrima Hampson, 1913
- Ophiusa conspicienda (Walker, 1858)
- Ophiusa david (Holland, 1894)
- Ophiusa despecta (Holland, 1894)
- Ophiusa dilecta Walker, 1865
- Ophiusa selenaris (Guenée, 1852)
- Oraesia emarginata (Fabricius, 1794)
- Oraesia politzari Behounek, Hacker & Speidel, 2010
- Oraesia provocans Walker, [1858]
- Oruza divisa (Walker, 1862)
- Oruza dolichognatha Hampson, 1918
- Oruza latifera (Walker, 1869)
- Ozarba domina (Holland, 1894)
- Ozarba epimochla Bethune-Baker, 1911
- Ozarba rubrivena Hampson, 1910
- Pangrapta seriopuncta Hampson, 1926
- Panilla xylonea Hampson, 1926
- Parachalciope benitensis (Holland, 1894)
- Parachalciope binaria (Holland, 1894)
- Parachalciope deltifera (Felder & Rogenhofer, 1874)
- Parachalciope euclidicola (Walker, 1858)
- Parafodina ectrogia (Hampson, 1926)
- Paralephana camptocera Hampson, 1926
- Paralephana incurvata Hampson, 1926
- Paralephana leucopis Hampson, 1926
- Paralephana metaphaea Hampson, 1926
- Paralephana nigripalpis Hampson, 1926
- Paralephana patagiata Hampson, 1926
- Parallelura palumbiodes (Hampson, 1902)
- Pericyma mendax (Walker, 1858)
- Pericyma polygramma Hampson, 1913
- Phaegorista similis Walker, 1869
- Phaeoscia canipars Hampson, 1926
- Phalerodes cauta (Hampson, 1902)
- Phlogochroa albiguttula Hampson, 1926
- Phlogochroa haemorrhanta (Bethune-Baker, 1911)
- Phlogochroa melanomesa Hampson, 1926
- Phytometra nyctichroa (Hampson, 1926)
- Plecoptera androconiata Hampson, 1926
- Plecoptera costisignata Hampson, 1926
- Plecoptera geminilinea Hampson, 1926
- Plecoptera mesostriga Hampson, 1926
- Plecoptera resistens (Walker, 1858)
- Plecopterodes melliflua (Holland, 1897)
- Plecopterodes moderata (Wallengren, 1860)
- Plusia hemichalcea (Hampson, 1913)
- Plusiodonta ionochrota Hampson, 1926
- Polydesma umbricola Boisduval, 1833
- Polytela cliens (Felder & Rogenhofer, 1874)
- Polytelodes florifera (Walker, 1858)
- Prionofrontia ochrosia Hampson, 1926
- Prolymnia atrifera Hampson, 1911
- Pseudoarcte melanis (Mabille, 1890)
- Pseudogiria hypographa (Hampson, 1926)
- Pseudozarba bipartita (Herrich-Schäffer, 1950)
- Remigiodes remigina (Mabille, 1884)
- Rhabdophera clathrum (Guenée, 1852)
- Rhesalides nigeriensis Hampson, 1926
- Rhynchina leucodonta Hampson, 1910
- Rhynchina paliscia Bethune-Baker, 1911
- Rhynchina tinctalis (Zeller, 1852)
- Rougeotiana xanthoperas (Hampson, 1926)
- Saroba isocyma Hampson, 1926
- Sarothroceras banaka (Plötz, 1880)
- Schausia leona (Schaus, 1893)
- Soloella guttivaga (Walker, 1854)
- Sphingomorpha chlorea (Cramer, 1777)
- Spodoptera cilium Guenée, 1852
- Spodoptera exempta (Walker, 1857)
- Spodoptera exigua (Hübner, 1808)
- Spodoptera littoralis (Boisduval, 1833)
- Spodoptera mauritia (Boisduval, 1833)
- Stictoptera confluens (Walker, 1858)
- Syngrapha circumflexa (Linnaeus, 1767)
- Sypnoides equatorialis (Holland, 1894)
- Tachosa acronyctoides Walker, 1869
- Tathodelta furvitincta Hampson, 1926
- Tatorinia pallidipennis Hampson, 1926
- Tatorinia rufipennis Hampson, 1926
- Tavia nana Hampson, 1926
- Taviodes congenita Hampson, 1926
- Taviodes discomma Hampson, 1926
- Taviodes excisa Hampson, 1926
- Thalatha occidens Hampson, 1911
- Thiacidas dukei (Pinhey, 1968)
- Thiacidas juvenis Hacker & Zilli, 2007
- Thiacidas kanoensis Hacker & Zilli, 2007
- Thiacidas meii Hacker & Zilli, 2007
- Thiacidas mukim (Berio, 1977)
- Thiacidas stassarti Hacker & Zilli, 2007
- Thyas metaphaea (Hampson, 1913)
- Thyas parallelipipeda (Guenée, 1852)
- Thysanoplusia cupreomicans (Hampson, 1909)
- Timora umbrifascia Hampson, 1913
- Timora unifascia Bethune-Baker, 1911
- Tolna sinifera Hampson, 1913
- Tolna sypnoides (Butler, 1878)
- Tolna versicolor Walker, 1869
- Trichopalpina zethesia Hampson, 1926
- Trigonodes hyppasia (Cramer, 1779)
- Ugia duplicilinea Hampson, 1926
- Ugia stigmaphora Hampson, 1926
- Ugia straminilinea Hampson, 1926
- Ulotrichopus tinctipennis (Hampson, 1902)
- Zethesides pusilla Hampson, 1926

== Nolidae ==
- Aiteta costiplaga Hampson, 1905
- Aiteta escalerai Kheil, 1909
- Aiteta gamma (Hampson, 1905)
- Aiteta meterythra Hampson, 1905
- Aiteta veluta Hampson, 1912
- Arcyophora patricula (Hampson, 1902)
- Blenina chloromelana (Mabille, 1890)
- Blenina chrysochlora (Walker, 1865)
- Blenina diagona Hampson, 1912
- Bryophilopsis anomoiota (Bethune-Baker, 1911)
- Bryophilopsis lunifera Hampson, 1912
- Bryophilopsis tarachoides Mabille, 1900
- Bryothripa miophaea Hampson, 1912
- Earias biplaga Walker, 1866
- Earias cupreoviridis (Walker, 1862)
- Earias glaucescens (Hampson, 1905)
- Earias insulana (Boisduval, 1833)
- Earias ogovana Holland, 1893
- Eligma hypsoides (Walker, 1869)
- Garella nephelota Hampson, 1912
- Gigantoceras rectilinea Hampson, 1912
- Hypodeva barbata Holland, 1894
- Hypodeva nocturna (Hampson, 1905)
- Iscadia glaucograpta (Hampson, 1912)
- Leocyma camilla (Druce, 1887)
- Lophocrama auritincta (Hampson, 1905)
- Lophocrama phoenicochlora Hampson, 1912
- Maurilia albirivula Hampson, 1905
- Maurilia arcuata (Walker, [1858])
- Maurilia atrirena Hampson, 1918
- Maurilia heterochroa Hampson, 1905
- Maurilia phaea Hampson, 1905
- Maurilia rufirena Hampson, 1918
- Meganola cretacea (Hampson, 1914)
- Metaleptina albibasis Holland, 1893
- Metaleptina albilinea Hampson, 1912
- Metaleptina digramma (Hampson, 1905)
- Metaleptina dileuca Hampson, 1912
- Metaleptina geminastra (Hampson, 1905)
- Metaleptina microcyma (Hampson, 1905)
- Metaleptina nigribasis Holland, 1893
- Neaxestis piperita (Hampson, 1905)
- Negeta approximans Hampson, 1912
- Negeta luminosa (Walker, 1858)
- Negeta mesoleuca (Holland, 1894)
- Negeta phaeopepla (Hampson, 1905)
- Negeta stalactitis (Hampson, 1905)
- Neonegeta purpurea Hampson, 1912
- Neonegeta trigonica (Hampson, 1905)
- Neonegeta xanthobasis (Hampson, 1905)
- Nola apicalis (Hampson, 1903)
- Nola atripuncta (Hampson, 1909)
- Nola chionea Hampson, 1911
- Nola melanoscelis (Hampson, 1914)
- Nola omphalota (Hampson, 1903)
- Nola perfusca Hampson, 1911
- Nola phaeocraspis (Hampson, 1909)
- Odontestis prosticta (Holland, 1894)
- Pardoxia graellsii (Feisthamel, 1837)
- Periplusia cinerascens Holland, 1894
- Periplusia nubilicosta Holland, 1894
- Plusiocalpe pallida Holland, 1894
- Risoba lunata (Möschler, 1887)
- Selepa cumasia Hampson, 1912
- Selepa docilis Butler, 1881
- Selepa leucograpta Hampson, 1912
- Westermannia anchorita Holland, 1893
- Westermannia goodi Hampson, 1912

== Notodontidae ==
- Acroctena pallida (Butler, 1882)
- Afroplitis dierli (Kiriakoff, 1979)
- Afroplitis politzaria (Kiriakoff, 1979)
- Amphiphalera leuconephra Hampson, 1910
- Anaphe subsordida Butler, 1893
- Anaphe venata Butler, 1878
- Antheua bidentata (Hampson, 1910)
- Antheua delicata Bethune-Baker, 1911
- Antheua rufovittata (Aurivillius, 1901)
- Aprosdocetos inexpectata (Rothschild, 1917)
- Arciera lanuginosa (Rothschild, 1917)
- Baliopteryx baccata (Hampson, 1910)
- Boscawenia polioplaga (Hampson, 1910)
- Bostrychogyna bella (Bethune-Baker, 1913)
- Brachychira ferruginea Aurivillius, 1905
- Catarctia subrosea Bethune-Baker, 1911
- Chlorocalliope rivata (Hampson, 1910)
- Chlorochadisra pinheyi Kiriakoff, 1975
- Crestonica incisus (Rothschild, 1917)
- Desmeocraera ardalio Kiriakoff, 1958
- Desmeocraera dicax Kiriakoff, 1958
- Desmeocraera formosa Kiriakoff, 1958
- Desmeocraera glauca Gaede, 1928
- Desmeocraera imploratrix Kiriakoff, 1958
- Desmeocraera latex (Druce, 1901)
- Desmeocraera latifasciata Gaede, 1928
- Desmeocraera leucosticta (Hampson, 1910)
- Desmeocraera mawa Kiriakoff, 1979
- Desmeocraera mkabi Kiriakoff, 1979
- Desmeocraera olivina Kiriakoff, 1958
- Desmeocraera sincera Kiriakoff, 1958
- Desmeocraera vicaria Kiriakoff, 1979
- Desmeocraerula pallida Kiriakoff, 1963
- Enomotarcha chloana (Holland, 1893)
- Enomotarcha metaphaea Kiriakoff, 1979
- Epicerura catori (Bethune-Baker, 1911)
- Epicerura tamsi Kiriakoff, 1963
- Janthinisca badia Kiriakoff, 1979
- Janthinisca gerda Kiriakoff, 1979
- Janthinisca linda Kiriakoff, 1979
- Janthinisca politzari Kiriakoff, 1979
- Mainiella subterminalis Kiriakoff, 1962
- Odontoperas obliqualinea (Bethune-Baker, 1911)
- Odontoperas rosacea Kiriakoff, 1959
- Paradiastema monotonia Kiriakoff, 1979
- Paradiastema nitens Bethune-Baker, 1911
- Paradiastema pulverea Hampson, 1910
- Phalera atrata (Grünberg, 1907)
- Psalisodes bistriata (Kiriakoff, 1962)
- Quista citrina Kiriakoff, 1979
- Quista niveiplaga (Hampson, 1910)
- Roppa rhabdophora (Hampson, 1910)
- Scalmicauda ectoleuca Hampson, 1910
- Scalmicauda macrosema Kiriakoff, 1959
- Scalmicauda rubrolineata Kiriakoff, 1959
- Scalmicauda vinacea Kiriakoff, 1959
- Scalmicauda xanthogyna Hampson, 1910
- Scrancia astur Kiriakoff, 1962
- Scrancia cupreitincta Kiriakoff, 1962
- Scrancia expleta Kiriakoff, 1962
- Scrancia leucopera Hampson, 1910
- Scrancia rothschildi Kiriakoff, 1965
- Scrancia tephraea (Bethune-Baker, 1911)
- Scranciola rufula (Hampson, 1910)
- Stauropussa chloe (Holland, 1893)
- Stenostaura vittata Kiriakoff, 1965
- Synete parallelis Kiriakoff, 1979
- Synete subcaeca Kiriakoff, 1959
- Tmetopteryx bisecta (Rothschild, 1917)
- Tricholoba minuta Kiriakoff, 1979
- Tricholoba unicolor Kiriakoff, 1979
- Xanthodonta argyllacea Kiriakoff, 1961
- Xanthodonta minima (Hampson, 1910)

== Oecophoridae ==
- Stathmopoda ficivora Kasy, 1973

== Pantheidae ==
- Raphia buchanani Rothschild, 1921

== Psychidae ==
- Eumeta cervina Druce, 1887
- Eumeta rotunda Bourgogne, 1965
- Eumeta rougeoti Bourgogne, 1955
- Melasina immanis Meyrick, 1908
- Melasina trichodyta Meyrick, 1924

== Pterophoridae ==
- Crocydoscelus ferrugineum Walsingham, 1897
- Exelastis vuattouxi Bigot, 1970
- Hellinsia aethiopicus (Amsel, 1963)
- Hepalastis pumilio (Zeller, 1873)
- Lantanophaga pusillidactylus (Walker, 1864)
- Megalorhipida leucodactylus (Fabricius, 1794)
- Platyptilia molopias Meyrick, 1906
- Pterophorus albidus (Zeller, 1852)
- Pterophorus spissa (Bigot, 1969)
- Sphenarches anisodactylus (Walker, 1864)
- Stenoptilodes taprobanes (Felder & Rogenhofer, 1875)

== Pyralidae ==
- Acracona remipedalis (Karsch, 1900)
- Lamoria imbella (Walker, 1864)
- Palmia adustalis (Hampson, 1917)

== Saturniidae ==
- Bunaeopsis hersilia (Westwood, 1849)
- Decachorda fletcheri Rougeot, 1970
- Epiphora perspicuus (Butler, 1878)
- Epiphora rectifascia Rothschild, 1907
- Goodia hierax Jordan, 1922
- Gynanisa maja (Klug, 1836)
- Holocerina angulata (Aurivillius, 1893)
- Holocerina smilax (Westwood, 1849)
- Imbrasia obscura (Butler, 1878)
- Lobobunaea acetes (Westwood, 1849)
- Lobobunaea phaedusa (Drury, 1782)
- Ludia hansali Felder, 1874
- Ludia obscura Aurivillius, 1893
- Nudaurelia alopia Westwood, 1849
- Orthogonioptilum adiegetum Karsch, 1892
- Orthogonioptilum prox Karsch, 1892
- Pseudantheraea discrepans (Butler, 1878)
- Pseudantheraea imperator Rougeot, 1962
- Rohaniella pygmaea (Maassen & Weymer, 1885)

== Sesiidae ==
- Melittia chalconota Hampson, 1910
- Pseudomelittia cingulata Gaede, 1929
- Sura rufitibia Hampson, 1919
- Tipulamima sexualis (Hampson, 1910)
- Trichocerata lambornella (Durrant, 1913)

== Sphingidae ==
- Acherontia atropos (Linnaeus, 1758)
- Andriasa contraria Walker, 1856
- Antinephele anomala (Butler, 1882)
- Cephonodes hylas (Linnaeus, 1771)
- Falcatula cymatodes (Rothschild & Jordan, 1912)
- Hippotion irregularis (Walker, 1856)
- Leucophlebia afra Karsch, 1891
- Lophostethus dumolinii (Angas, 1849)
- Neopolyptychus ancylus (Rothschild & Jordan, 1916)
- Neopolyptychus consimilis (Rothschild & Jordan, 1903)
- Neopolyptychus prionites (Rothschild & Jordan, 1916)
- Neopolyptychus pygarga (Karsch, 1891)
- Nephele bipartita Butler, 1878
- Nephele maculosa Rothschild & Jordan, 1903
- Nephele peneus (Cramer, 1776)
- Phylloxiphia bicolor (Rothschild, 1894)
- Phylloxiphia vicina (Rothschild & Jordan, 1915)
- Platysphinx constrigilis (Walker, 1869)
- Platysphinx phyllis Rothschild & Jordan, 1903
- Platysphinx stigmatica (Mabille, 1878)
- Platysphinx vicaria Jordan, 1920
- Polyptychoides digitatus (Karsch, 1891)
- Polyptychus andosa Walker, 1856
- Polyptychus anochus Rothschild & Jordan, 1906
- Polyptychus carteri (Butler, 1882)
- Polyptychus coryndoni Rothschild & Jordan, 1903
- Polyptychus hollandi Rothschild & Jordan, 1903
- Polyptychus orthographus Rothschild & Jordan, 1903
- Polyptychus wojtusiaki Pierre, 2001
- Pseudenyo benitensis Holland, 1889
- Pseudoclanis molitor (Rothschild & Jordan, 1912)
- Pseudoclanis rhadamistus (Fabricius, 1781)
- Pseudopolyptychus foliaceus (Rothschild & Jordan, 1903)
- Sphingonaepiopsis nana (Walker, 1856)
- Temnora angulosa Rothschild & Jordan, 1906
- Temnora avinoffi Clark, 1919
- Temnora camerounensis Clark, 1923
- Temnora griseata Rothschild & Jordan, 1903
- Temnora hollandi Clark, 1920
- Temnora reutlingeri (Holland, 1889)
- Temnora stevensi Rothschild & Jordan, 1903
- Theretra orpheus (Herrich-Schäffer, 1854)
- Theretra perkeo Rothschild & Jordan, 1903
- Theretra tessmanni Gehlen, 1927

== Thyrididae ==
- Amalthocera tiphys Boisduval, 1836
- Byblisia albaproxima Bethune-Baker, 1911
- Byblisia latipes Walker, 1865
- Byblisia ochracea Jordan, 1907
- Collinsa subscripta (Warren, 1899)
- Cornuterus palairanta (Bethune-Baker, 1911)
- Dysodia collinsi Whalley, 1968
- Dysodia intermedia (Walker, 1865)
- Dysodia vitrina (Boisduval, 1829)
- Dysodia zelleri (Dewitz, 1881)
- Epaena trijuncta (Warren, 1898)
- Hapana verticalis (Warren, 1899)
- Heteroschista nigranalis Warren, 1903
- Hypolamprus curviflua (Warren, 1898)
- Kalenga ansorgei (Warren, 1899)
- Kuja fractifascia (Warren, 1908)
- Kuja gemmata (Hampson, 1906)
- Marmax hyparchus (Cramer, 1779)
- Marmax semiaurata (Walker, 1854)
- Nemea eugrapha (Hampson, 1906)
- Ninia plumipes (Drury, 1782)
- Opula spilotata (Warren, 1898)
- Rhodoneura serraticornis (Warren, 1899)
- Sijua latizonalis (Hampson, 1897)
- Sijua sigillata (Warren, 1898)
- Striglina rothi Warren, 1898
- Symphleps suffusa Warren, 1898
- Trichobaptes auristrigata (Plötz, 1880)

== Tineidae ==
- Acridotarsa melipecta (Meyrick, 1915)
- Ceratophaga vastellus (Zeller, 1852)
- Dasyses nigerica Gozmány, 1968
- Edosa nigralba (Gozmány, 1968)
- Edosa phlegethon (Gozmány, 1968)
- Erechthias travestita (Gozmány, 1968)
- Hyperbola pastoralis (Meyrick, 1931)
- Monopis jacobsi Gozmány, 1967
- Monopis megalodelta Meyrick, 1908
- Perissomastix nigerica Gozmány, 1967
- Perissomastix sericea Gozmány, 1966
- Perissomastix similatrix Gozmány, 1968
- Perissomastix stibarodes (Meyrick, 1908)
- Phalloscardia semiumbrata (Meyrick, 1920)
- Phereoeca praecox Gozmány & Vári, 1973
- Phereoeca proletaria (Meyrick, 1921)
- Phthoropoea oenochares (Meyrick, 1920)
- Pitharcha chalinaea Meyrick, 1908
- Sphallestasis cristata (Gozmány, 1967)
- Syncalipsis optania (Meyrick, 1908)
- Syncalipsis typhodes (Meyrick, 1917)
- Tinemelitta ceriaula (Meyrick, 1914)
- Tiquadra cultrifera Meyrick, 1914
- Wegneria speciosa (Meyrick, 1914)

== Tortricidae ==
- Accra rubrothicta Razowski, 1986
- Accra viridis (Walsingham, 1891)
- Apotoforma fustigera Razowski, 1986
- Basigonia anisoscia Diakonoff, 1983
- Brachiolia wojtusiaki Razowski, 1986
- Cornesia ormoperla Razowski, 1981
- Ebodina lagoana Razowski & Tuck, 2000
- Eccopsis incultana (Walker, 1863)
- Eccopsis praecedens Walsingham, 1897
- Eccopsis wahlbergiana Zeller, 1852
- Nephograptis necropina Razowski, 1981
- Panegyra sectatrix (Razowski, 1981)
- Paraeccopsis insellata (Meyrick, 1920)
- Plinthograptis clostos Razowski, 1990
- Plinthograptis clyster Razowski, 1990
- Plinthograptis pleroma Razowski, 1981
- Plinthograptis rhytisma Razowski, 1981
- Plinthograptis seladonia (Razowski, 1981)
- Plinthograptis sipalia Razowski, 1981
- Rubidograptis regulus Razowski, 1981
- Rubrograptis recrudescentia Razowski, 1981
- Russograptis callopista (Durrant, 1913)
- Russograptis medleri Razowski, 1981
- Russograptis solaris Razowski, 1981
- Rutilograptis cornesi Razowski, 1981
- Sanguinograptis obtrecator Razowski, 1981
- Sanguinograptis ochrolegnia Razowski, 1986

== Uraniidae ==
- Acropteris nigrisquama Warren, 1897
- Epiplema inelegans Warren, 1898

== Zygaenidae ==
- Astyloneura esmeralda (Hampson, 1920)
- Tasema unxia (Druce, 1896)
