= Rubrograptis =

Scientific classification
- Kingdom: Animalia
- Phylum: Arthropoda
- Clade: Pancrustacea
- Class: Insecta
- Order: Lepidoptera
- Family: Tortricidae
- Tribe: Tortricini
- Genus: Rubrograptis; Razowski, 1981

Genus of tortrix moths

Rubrograptis is a genus of moths belonging to the family Tortricidae.

== Species ==
- Rubrograptis recrudescentia Razowski, 1981

== Former species ==
- Rubrograptis praeconia (Meyrick, 1937)

== See also ==
- List of Tortricidae genera
