= Parerupa undilinealis =

Scientific classification
- Kingdom: Animalia
- Phylum: Arthropoda
- Class: Insecta
- Order: Lepidoptera
- Family: Crambidae
- Subfamily: Crambinae
- Tribe: incertae sedis
- Genus: Parerupa
- Species: P. undilinealis

Binomial name
- Parerupa undilinealis (Hampson, 1919)

Synonyms
- Coniesta undilinealis Hampson, 1919

Species of moth

Parerupa undilinealis is a moth in the family Crambidae. It was described by George Hampson in 1919. It is found in Malawi.
