= Acanthofrontia =

Scientific classification
- Kingdom: Animalia
- Phylum: Arthropoda
- Class: Insecta
- Order: Lepidoptera
- Superfamily: Noctuoidea
- Family: Erebidae
- Subfamily: Arctiinae
- Tribe: Lithosiini
- Genus: Acanthofrontia; Hampson, 1910

Genus of tiger moths

Acanthofrontia is a genus of erebid moths in the subfamily Arctiinae with Afrotropical distribution. It was described by George Hampson in 1910.

== Species ==
As of November 2019, AfroMoths lists the following species:

- Acanthofrontia anacantha Hampson, 1914
- Acanthofrontia atricosta Hampson, 1918
- Acanthofrontia bianulata (Wichgraf, 1922)
- Acanthofrontia dicycla Hampson, 1918
- Acanthofrontia frontalis (Strand, 1909)
- Acanthofrontia lithosiana Hampson, 1910 - type species
