= Conopsia bicolor =

Scientific classification
- Kingdom: Animalia
- Phylum: Arthropoda
- Class: Insecta
- Order: Lepidoptera
- Family: Sesiidae
- Genus: Conopsia
- Species: C. bicolor

Binomial name
- Conopsia bicolor (Le Cerf, 1917)

Synonyms
- Zenodoxus bicolor Le Cerf, 1917; Trichocerata bicolor

Species of moth

Conopsia bicolor is a moth of the family Sesiidae. It is known from Benin.
