= Panegyra sokokana =

Scientific classification
- Domain: Eukaryota
- Kingdom: Animalia
- Phylum: Arthropoda
- Class: Insecta
- Order: Lepidoptera
- Family: Tortricidae
- Genus: Panegyra
- Species: P. sokokana

Binomial name
- Panegyra sokokana Razowski, 2012

Species of moth

Panegyra sokokana is a species of moth of the family Tortricidae. It is found in Kenya.

The wingspan is about 11 mm (0.43 in).
