= Pseudomelittia andraenipennis =

Scientific classification
- Kingdom: Animalia
- Phylum: Arthropoda
- Class: Insecta
- Order: Lepidoptera
- Family: Sesiidae
- Genus: Pseudomelittia
- Species: P. andraenipennis

Binomial name
- Pseudomelittia andraenipennis (Walker, 1856)

Synonyms
- Melittia andraenipennis Walker, 1856

Species of moth

Pseudomelittia andraenipennis is a moth of the family Sesiidae. It is known from South Africa.
