= Ebodina simplex =

Scientific classification
- Kingdom: Animalia
- Phylum: Arthropoda
- Clade: Pancrustacea
- Class: Insecta
- Order: Lepidoptera
- Family: Tortricidae
- Genus: Ebodina
- Species: E. simplex

Binomial name
- Ebodina simplex Diakonoff, 1968

Species of moth

Ebodina simplex is a species of moth of the family Tortricidae. It is found in the Philippines (Luzon), Vietnam and Papua New Guinea.
