= Hyalea succinalis =

Scientific classification
- Kingdom: Animalia
- Phylum: Arthropoda
- Class: Insecta
- Order: Lepidoptera
- Family: Crambidae
- Genus: Hyalea
- Species: H. succinalis

Binomial name
- Hyalea succinalis Guenée, 1854

Species of moth

Hyalea succinalis is a moth in the family Crambidae. It was described by Achille Guenée in 1854. It is found in Brazil.
