= Panegyra cerussochlaena =

Scientific classification
- Domain: Eukaryota
- Kingdom: Animalia
- Phylum: Arthropoda
- Class: Insecta
- Order: Lepidoptera
- Family: Tortricidae
- Genus: Panegyra
- Species: P. cerussochlaena

Binomial name
- Panegyra cerussochlaena Razowski, 2005

Synonyms
- Panegyra cerussochlaeena

Species of moth

Panegyra cerussochlaena is a species of moth of the family Tortricidae. It is found in Ghana.

The wingspan is about 11 mm.
