= Archithosia =

Scientific classification
- Domain: Eukaryota
- Kingdom: Animalia
- Phylum: Arthropoda
- Class: Insecta
- Order: Lepidoptera
- Superfamily: Noctuoidea
- Family: Erebidae
- Subfamily: Arctiinae
- Tribe: Lithosiini
- Genus: Archithosia; Birket-Smith, 1965

Synonyms
- Architosia Durante & Panzera, 2002

Genus of moths

Archithosia is a genus of moths in the subfamily Arctiinae. The genus was erected by Sven Jorgen R. Birket-Smith in 1965.

== Species ==
- Archithosia chrysargyrea (Kiriakoff, 1963)
- Archithosia costimacula Mabille, 1878
- Archithosia discors Kiriakoff, 1958
- Archithosia duplicata Birket-Smith, 1965
- Archithosia flavifrontella Strand, 1912
- Archithosia gilvafrons Durante & Panzera, 2002
- Archithosia makomensis Strand, 1912
- Archithosia rhyparodactyla (Kiriakoff, 1963)
- Archithosia similis Birket-Smith, 1965
- Archithosia sordida Birket-Smith, 1965
- Archithosia tryphosa Kiriakoff, 1958
