= Panegyra metria =

Scientific classification
- Domain: Eukaryota
- Kingdom: Animalia
- Phylum: Arthropoda
- Class: Insecta
- Order: Lepidoptera
- Family: Tortricidae
- Genus: Panegyra
- Species: P. metria

Binomial name
- Panegyra metria Razowski, 2005

Species of moth

Panegyra metria is a species of moth of the family Tortricidae. It is found in Ghana.

The wingspan is about 10.5 mm.
