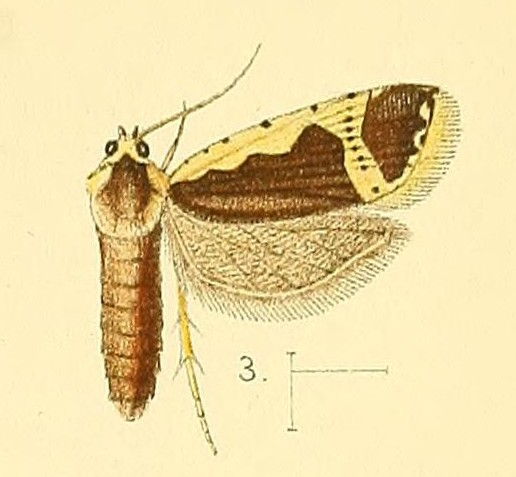
- Panegyra flavicostana

Scientific classification
- Domain: Eukaryota
- Kingdom: Animalia
- Phylum: Arthropoda
- Class: Insecta
- Order: Lepidoptera
- Family: Tortricidae
- Tribe: Tortricini
- Genus: Panegyra; Diakonoff, 1960

Synonyms
- Heterograptis Razowski, 1981

= Panegyra =

Genus of tortrix moths

Panegyra is a genus of moths belonging to the subfamily Tortricinae of the family Tortricidae. The genus was erected by Alexey Diakonoff in 1960.

== Species ==
- Panegyra cerussochlaena Razowski, 2005
- Panegyra cosmophora Diakonoff, 1960
- Panegyra flavicostana (Walsingham, 1891)
- Panegyra metria Razowski, 2005
- Panegyra micans Razowski, 2005
- Panegyra praetexta Razowski & Wojtusiak, 2012
- Panegyra sectatrix (Razowski, 1981)
- Panegyra sokokana Razowski, 2012
- Panegyra stenovalva Razowski, 2005

== See also ==
- List of Tortricidae genera
