= Parerupa =

Scientific classification
- Domain: Eukaryota
- Kingdom: Animalia
- Phylum: Arthropoda
- Class: Insecta
- Order: Lepidoptera
- Family: Crambidae
- Subfamily: Crambinae
- Tribe: incertae sedis
- Genus: Parerupa; Hampson, 1919

Synonyms
- Coenotalis Hampson, 1919

Genus of moths

Parerupa is a genus of moths of the family Crambidae.

== Species ==
- Parerupa africana (Aurivillius, 1910)
- Parerupa bipunctalis (Hampson, 1919)
- Parerupa distictalis (Hampson, 1919)
- Parerupa undilinealis (Hampson, 1919)
