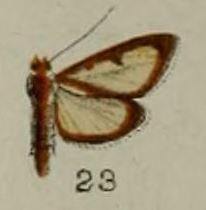

Scientific classification
- Kingdom: Animalia
- Phylum: Arthropoda
- Class: Insecta
- Order: Lepidoptera
- Family: Crambidae
- Genus: Hyalea
- Species: H. pallidalis

Binomial name
- Hyalea pallidalis Hampson, 1898

= Hyalea pallidalis =

Species of moth

Hyalea pallidalis is a moth in the family Crambidae. It was described by George Hampson in 1898. It is found in Peru and São Paulo, Brazil.
