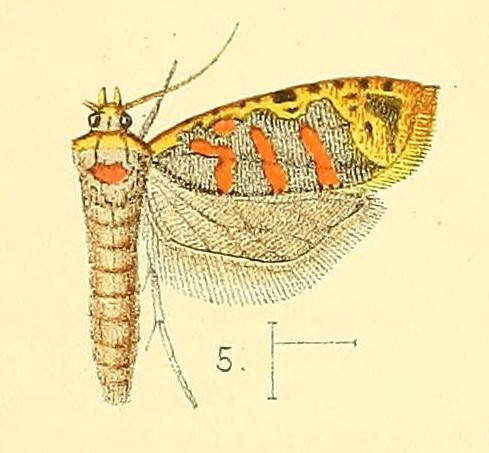
- Sanguinograptis albardana

Scientific classification
- Kingdom: Animalia
- Phylum: Arthropoda
- Class: Insecta
- Order: Lepidoptera
- Family: Tortricidae
- Tribe: Tortricini
- Genus: Sanguinograptis; Razowski, 1981

Type species
- Sanguinograptis obtrecator Razowski, 1981

= Sanguinograptis =

Genus of tortrix moths

Sanguinograptis is a genus of moths belonging to the subfamily Tortricinae of the family Tortricidae. All species in this genus are found in Africa.

== Species ==
- Sanguinograptis albardana (Snellen, 1872)
- Sanguinograptis obtrecator Razowski, 1981
- Sanguinograptis ochrolegnia Razowski, 1986
- Sanguinograptis prosphora Razowski & Wojtusiak, 2012

== See also ==
- List of Tortricidae genera
