= Russograptis albulata =

Scientific classification
- Kingdom: Animalia
- Phylum: Arthropoda
- Class: Insecta
- Order: Lepidoptera
- Family: Tortricidae
- Genus: Russograptis
- Species: R. albulata

Binomial name
- Russograptis albulata Razowski & Trematerra, 2010

Species of moth

Russograptis albulata is a species of moth of the family Tortricidae. It is found in Ethiopia, where it is only known from the Harenna Forest in the Bale Mountains. The wingspan is about 20 mm. Its head and thorax are dark brown. The forewings are whitish with faint greyish diagonal bands. The cilia are brownish-white. The hindwings are pale brown, with white cilia that have a slight brownish tint.

== Taxonomy ==
Russograptis albulata was described by the entomologists J. Razowski and P. Trematerra in 2010 on the basis of an adult female specimen collected from the Bale Mountains in Ethiopia. The specific epithet refers to the colour of the forewings and is derived from the albulata, meaning 'whitish'.

Based on the morphology of the female genitalia, it is closest to R. medleri.

== Description ==
Russograptis albulata has a wingspan of about 20 mm. Its head and thorax are dark brown. The forewings do not widen at the tips and are widest around the middle. The leading edge (costa) is curved, especially near the base, and the wingtip (apex) is rounded. The outer edge (termen) is fairly slanted and almost straight. The base color of the forewings is whitish with faint greyish diagonal bands. There are several dull brown markings, including a small spot near the base, brown areas along the middle, near the edge, and near the tip of the wing, as well as a shaded area near the tornus (inner angle of the wing). The cilia are brownish-white. The hindwings are pale brown, with white cilia that have a slight brownish tint.

In the female genitalia, the papilla analis is small and slender. The apophyses are moderately long and fairly robust. The sterigma is somewhat membranous and has a rough texture (scobinate), with a more hardened (sclerotized) edge near the base. The sclerite of the antrum is large; broad in the middle and narrower toward the base. The ductus seminalis is located just past the middle. The signum is a slightly curved plate that features a thorn-like projection.

The appearance of the male is unknown.

== Distribution ==
The species is endemic to Ethiopia, where it is known only from the Harenna Forest in the Bale Mountains.
