= Paratraea =

Scientific classification
- Domain: Eukaryota
- Kingdom: Animalia
- Phylum: Arthropoda
- Class: Insecta
- Order: Lepidoptera
- Family: Crambidae
- Subfamily: Crambinae
- Tribe: incertae sedis
- Genus: Paratraea; Hampson, 1919

Genus of moths

Paratraea is a genus of moths of the family Crambidae.

== Species ==
- Paratraea obliquivialis (Hampson, 1918)
- Paratraea plumbipicta Hampson, 1919
