= Conopsia =

Scientific classification
- Kingdom: Animalia
- Phylum: Arthropoda
- Class: Insecta
- Order: Lepidoptera
- Family: Sesiidae
- Tribe: Tinthiini
- Genus: Conopsia; Strand, [1913]

Species
- See text

Genus of moths

Conopsia is a genus of moths in the family Sesiidae.

== Species ==
- Conopsia bicolor (Le Cerf, 1917)
- Conopsia flavimacula Kallies, 2000
- Conopsia lambornella (Durrant, 1914)
- Conopsia phoenosoma (Meyrick, 1930)
- Conopsia terminiflava Strand, [1913]
