= Archithosia discors =

Scientific classification
- Kingdom: Animalia
- Phylum: Arthropoda
- Class: Insecta
- Order: Lepidoptera
- Superfamily: Noctuoidea
- Family: Erebidae
- Subfamily: Arctiinae
- Genus: Archithosia
- Species: A. discors

Binomial name
- Archithosia discors Kiriakoff, 1958

Species of moth

Archithosia discors is a moth of the subfamily Arctiinae. It was described by Sergius G. Kiriakoff in 1958. It is found in the Democratic Republic of the Congo and Uganda.
