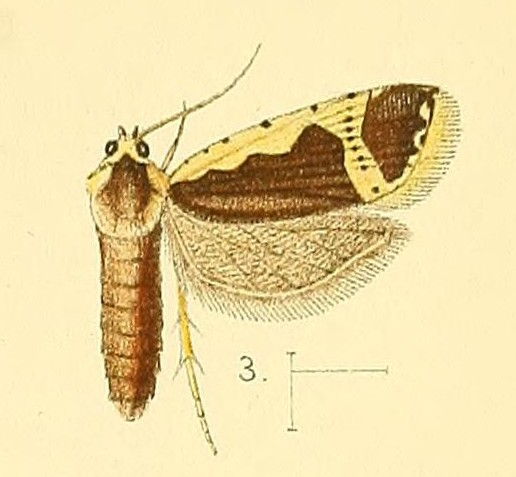

Scientific classification
- Domain: Eukaryota
- Kingdom: Animalia
- Phylum: Arthropoda
- Class: Insecta
- Order: Lepidoptera
- Family: Tortricidae
- Genus: Panegyra
- Species: P. flavicostana

Binomial name
- Panegyra flavicostana (Walsingham, 1891)

Synonyms
- Argyrotoxa flavicostana Walsingham, 1891; Heterograptis flavicostana

= Panegyra flavicostana =

Species of moth

Panegyra flavicostana is a species of moth of the family Tortricidae. It is found in Cameroon, Nigeria and Gambia.

The wingspan is about 13 mm. The forewings are greyish fuscous, the costal margin pale straw-colour to beyond the apical third. The lower edge of the clearly defined pale costal band is somewhat sinuous and narrowly margined with whitish. At one-third from the apex is a pale straw-coloured transverse streak, or narrow fascia, which reaches to the dorsal margin immediately before the anal angle, where it is somewhat dilated. This fascia is much attenuated (almost interrupted) below the costal band, with which it becomes blended, it is narrowly margined on both sides by a whitish line. There is a pale whitish narrow sinuous line which runs from the anal angle around the apical margin and there are four or five small greyish fuscous costal spots in the pale costal band, and a series of spots of the same colour running down the centre of the transverse fascia. The hindwings are greyish brown and rather pointed, with the outer margin very oblique.
