= Paratraea obliquivialis =

Scientific classification
- Kingdom: Animalia
- Phylum: Arthropoda
- Class: Insecta
- Order: Lepidoptera
- Family: Crambidae
- Subfamily: Crambinae
- Tribe: incertae sedis
- Genus: Paratraea
- Species: P. obliquivialis

Binomial name
- Paratraea obliquivialis (Hampson, 1918)

Synonyms
- Loxostege obliquivialis Hampson, 1918; Paratraea griseifasciata Hampson, 1919; Paratraea griseifascia Błeszyński, 1962

Species of moth

Paratraea obliquivialis is a moth in the family Crambidae. It was described by George Hampson in 1918. It is found in South Africa.
