= Panegyra praetexta =

Scientific classification
- Domain: Eukaryota
- Kingdom: Animalia
- Phylum: Arthropoda
- Class: Insecta
- Order: Lepidoptera
- Family: Tortricidae
- Genus: Panegyra
- Species: P. praetexta

Binomial name
- Panegyra praetexta Razowski & Wojtusiak, 2012

Species of moth

Panegyra praetexta is a species of moth of the family Tortricidae. It is found in Nigeria.

The wingspan is about 18.5 mm.

== Etymology ==
The species name refers to the forewing markings and is derived from Latin praetexta (meaning adorned at the edge).
