= Pseudomelittia berlandi =

Scientific classification
- Kingdom: Animalia
- Phylum: Arthropoda
- Class: Insecta
- Order: Lepidoptera
- Family: Sesiidae
- Genus: Pseudomelittia
- Species: P. berlandi

Binomial name
- Pseudomelittia berlandi Le Cerf, 1917

Species of moth

Pseudomelittia berlandi is a moth of the family Sesiidae. It is known from Malawi and Tanzania.
