= Panegyra stenovalva =

Scientific classification
- Kingdom: Animalia
- Phylum: Arthropoda
- Clade: Pancrustacea
- Class: Insecta
- Order: Lepidoptera
- Family: Tortricidae
- Genus: Panegyra
- Species: P. stenovalva

Binomial name
- Panegyra stenovalva Razowski, 2005

Species of moth

Panegyra stenovalva is a species of moth of the family Tortricidae. It is found in Madagascar.

The wingspan is about 8 mm.
