= Sanguinograptis prosphora =

Scientific classification
- Domain: Eukaryota
- Kingdom: Animalia
- Phylum: Arthropoda
- Class: Insecta
- Order: Lepidoptera
- Family: Tortricidae
- Genus: Sanguinograptis
- Species: S. prosphora

Binomial name
- Sanguinograptis prosphora Razowski & Wojtusiak, 2012

Species of moth

Sanguinograptis prosphora is a species of moth of the family Tortricidae. It is found in Nigeria.

The wingspan is about 10 mm.
