= Parerupa africana =

Scientific classification
- Domain: Eukaryota
- Kingdom: Animalia
- Phylum: Arthropoda
- Class: Insecta
- Order: Lepidoptera
- Family: Crambidae
- Subfamily: Crambinae
- Tribe: incertae sedis
- Genus: Parerupa
- Species: P. africana

Binomial name
- Parerupa africana (Aurivillius, 1910)

Synonyms
- Diatraea africana Aurivillius, 1910; Parerupa diagonalis Hampson, 1919

Species of moth

Parerupa africana is a moth in the family Crambidae. It was described by Per Olof Christopher Aurivillius in 1910. It is found in Kenya, South Africa and Tanzania.
