= Ebodina lithoptila =

Scientific classification
- Kingdom: Animalia
- Phylum: Arthropoda
- Class: Insecta
- Order: Lepidoptera
- Family: Tortricidae
- Genus: Ebodina
- Species: E. lithoptila

Binomial name
- Ebodina lithoptila (Diakonoff, 1960)

Synonyms
- Croesia lithoptila Diakonoff, 1960

Species of moth

Ebodina lithoptila is a species of moth of the family Tortricidae. It is found in Madagascar.

== Habitat ==
Ebodina lithoptila thrives in Madagascar's subtropical climate.
