= Ebodina =

Scientific classification
- Domain: Eukaryota
- Kingdom: Animalia
- Phylum: Arthropoda
- Class: Insecta
- Order: Lepidoptera
- Family: Tortricidae
- Tribe: Polyorthini
- Genus: Ebodina; Diakonoff, 1968

Species
- See text

Genus of tortrix moths

Ebodina is a genus of moths belonging to the family Tortricidae.

== Species ==
- Ebodina circensis Meyrick, 1928
- Ebodina elephantodes Meyrick, 1938
- Ebodina lagoana Razowski & Tuck, 2000
- Ebodina lithoptila Diakonoff, 1960
- Ebodina simplex Diakonoff, 1968
- Ebodina sinica Liu & Bai, 1986
