= Hyalea boliviensis =

Scientific classification
- Domain: Eukaryota
- Kingdom: Animalia
- Phylum: Arthropoda
- Class: Insecta
- Order: Lepidoptera
- Family: Crambidae
- Genus: Hyalea
- Species: H. boliviensis

Binomial name
- Hyalea boliviensis Dognin, 1905

Synonyms
- Phostria carusalis Schaus, 1920

Species of moth

Hyalea boliviensis is a moth in the family Crambidae. It was described by Paul Dognin in 1905. It is found in Bolivia.
