= Ebodina sinica =

Scientific classification
- Domain: Eukaryota
- Kingdom: Animalia
- Phylum: Arthropoda
- Class: Insecta
- Order: Lepidoptera
- Family: Tortricidae
- Genus: Ebodina
- Species: E. sinica

Binomial name
- Ebodina sinica Liu & Bai, 1986

Species of moth

Ebodina sinica is a species of moth of the family Tortricidae. It is found in China (Yunnan), northern Thailand and Vietnam.
