= Pseudomelittia =

Scientific classification
- Kingdom: Animalia
- Phylum: Arthropoda
- Class: Insecta
- Order: Lepidoptera
- Family: Sesiidae
- Subfamily: Sesiinae
- Genus: Pseudomelittia; Le Cerf, 1917

Species
- See text

Genus of moths

Pseudomelittia is a genus of moths in the family Sesiidae.

== Species ==
- Pseudomelittia andraenipennis (Walker, 1856)
- Pseudomelittia berlandi Le Cerf, 1917
- Pseudomelittia cingulata Gaede, 1929
