= Plinthograptis =

Scientific classification
- Domain: Eukaryota
- Kingdom: Animalia
- Phylum: Arthropoda
- Class: Insecta
- Order: Lepidoptera
- Family: Tortricidae
- Tribe: Tortricini
- Genus: Plinthograptis; Razowski, 1981

Genus of tortrix moths

Plinthograptis is a genus of moths belonging to the family Tortricidae.

== Species ==
- Plinthograptis clostos Razowksi, 1990
- Plinthograptis clyster Razowski, 1990
- Plinthograptis ebogana Razowski, 2005
- Plinthograptis iitae Razowski, 2013
- Plinthograptis pleroma Razowski, 1981
- Plinthograptis rhytisma Razowski, 1981
- Plinthograptis seladonia (Razowski, 1981)
- Plinthograptis sipalia Razowski, 1981

== See also ==
- List of Tortricidae genera
