= Russograptis =

Scientific classification
- Domain: Eukaryota
- Kingdom: Animalia
- Phylum: Arthropoda
- Class: Insecta
- Order: Lepidoptera
- Family: Tortricidae
- Tribe: Tortricini
- Genus: Russograptis; Razowski, 1981

Genus of tortrix moths

Russograptis is a genus of moths belonging to the family Tortricidae.

== Species ==
- Russograptis albulata Razowski & Trematerra, 2010
- Russograptis callopista (Durrant, 1913)
- Russograptis medleri Razowski, 1981
- Russograptis solaris Razowski, 1981

== Former species ==
- Russograptis canthararcha (Meyrick, 1937)

== See also ==
- List of Tortricidae genera
