= Rutilograptis couteauxi =

Scientific classification
- Domain: Eukaryota
- Kingdom: Animalia
- Phylum: Arthropoda
- Class: Insecta
- Order: Lepidoptera
- Family: Tortricidae
- Genus: Rutilograptis
- Species: R. couteauxi

Binomial name
- Rutilograptis couteauxi (Ghesquière, 1940)

Synonyms
- Argyrotoxa couteauxi Ghesquière, 1940; Polemograptis couteauxi

Species of moth

Rutilograptis couteauxi is a species of moth of the family Tortricidae. It is found in the Democratic Republic of the Congo and Nigeria.

The larvae probably feed on Coccidae species, a family of scale insects.
