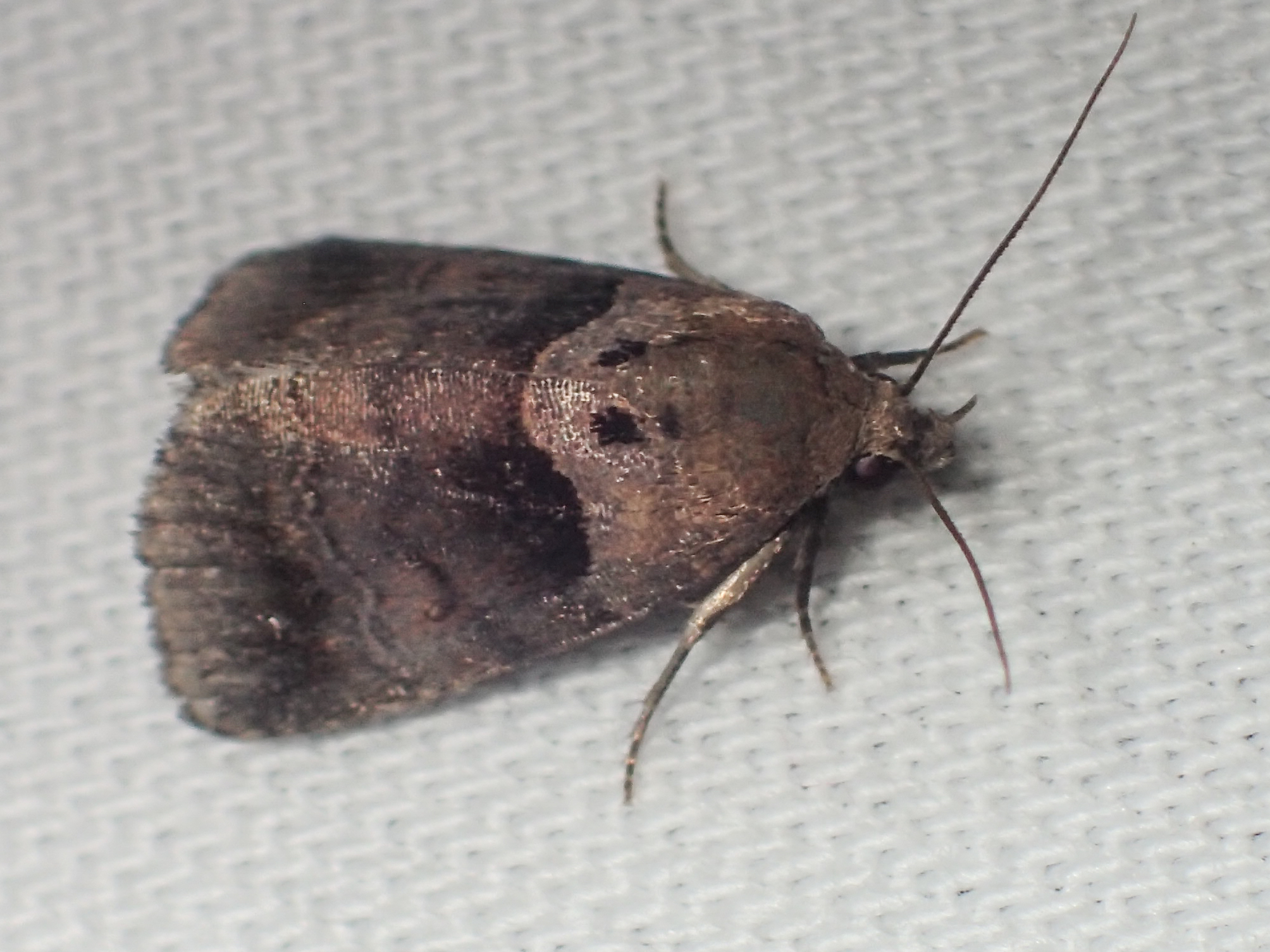
- Cretonia forficula

Scientific classification
- Kingdom: Animalia
- Phylum: Arthropoda
- Class: Insecta
- Order: Lepidoptera
- Superfamily: Noctuoidea
- Family: Noctuidae
- Genus: Cretonia; Walker, 1866

Synonyms
- Swinhoea Hampson, 1894; Svinhoea Hampson, 1902

= Cretonia =

Genus of moths

Cretonia is a genus of moths in the family Noctuidae. The genus was erected by Francis Walker in 1866.

== Species ==
- Cretonia acuticosta Holloway, 2009 India, Taiwan, Sumatra, Borneo, Java, Bali, Halmahera
- Cretonia brevioripalpus Hulstaert, 1924 Tenimber, Timor, Dammer, New Guinea, Solomons
- Cretonia ethiopica Hampson, 1910 Gambia, Zimbabwe, Mozambique, Kenya, Ethiopia
- Cretonia floccifera (Hampson, 1896) Bhutan
- Cretonia forficula Holloway, 2009 Peninsular Malaysia, Hainan, Borneo, Bali, Sulawesi
- Cretonia lanka (Holloway, 2009) Sri Lanka
- Cretonia platyphaeella Walker, 1866 Gambia, Sierra Leone, Nigeria
- Cretonia triloba Holloway, 2009 Philippines
- Cretonia vegetus (Swinhoe, 1885) India (Maharashtra), Myanmar, South Africa
