= Hyalea dividalis =

Scientific classification
- Domain: Eukaryota
- Kingdom: Animalia
- Phylum: Arthropoda
- Class: Insecta
- Order: Lepidoptera
- Family: Crambidae
- Genus: Hyalea
- Species: H. dividalis

Binomial name
- Hyalea dividalis (Geyer in Hübner, 1832)

Synonyms
- Anania dividalis Geyer in Hübner, 1832

Species of moth

Hyalea dividalis is a moth in the family Crambidae. It was described by Carl Geyer in 1832. It is found in Brazil.
