= Scopula inscriptata =

Scientific classification
- Kingdom: Animalia
- Phylum: Arthropoda
- Class: Insecta
- Order: Lepidoptera
- Family: Geometridae
- Genus: Scopula
- Species: S. inscriptata

Binomial name
- Scopula inscriptata (Walker, [1863])

Synonyms
- Acidalia inscriptata Walker, 1862; Cinglis acentra Warren, 1911 (preocc. Craspedia acentra Warren, 1897)

Species of geometer moth in subfamily Sterrhinae

Scopula inscriptata is a moth of the family Geometridae. It is found in Nigeria, Sierra Leone and South Africa.
