= Archithosia chrysargyrea =

Scientific classification
- Domain: Eukaryota
- Kingdom: Animalia
- Phylum: Arthropoda
- Class: Insecta
- Order: Lepidoptera
- Superfamily: Noctuoidea
- Family: Erebidae
- Subfamily: Arctiinae
- Genus: Archithosia
- Species: A. chrysargyrea

Binomial name
- Archithosia chrysargyrea (Kiriakoff, 1963)

Synonyms
- Lithosia chrysargyrea Kiriakoff, 1963; Lophilema chrysargyrea (Kiriakoff, 1963)

Species of moth

Archithosia chrysargyrea is a moth of the subfamily Arctiinae. It was described by Sergius G. Kiriakoff in 1963. It is found in the Democratic Republic of the Congo.
