= Conopsia terminiflava =

Scientific classification
- Kingdom: Animalia
- Phylum: Arthropoda
- Class: Insecta
- Order: Lepidoptera
- Family: Sesiidae
- Genus: Conopsia
- Species: C. terminiflava

Binomial name
- Conopsia terminiflava Strand, [1913]

Species of moth

Conopsia terminiflava is a moth of the family Sesiidae. It is found in Cameroon.
