= Plinthograptis iitae =

Scientific classification
- Domain: Eukaryota
- Kingdom: Animalia
- Phylum: Arthropoda
- Class: Insecta
- Order: Lepidoptera
- Family: Tortricidae
- Genus: Plinthograptis
- Species: P. iitae

Binomial name
- Plinthograptis iitae Razowski, 2013

Species of moth

Plinthograptis iitae is a species of moth of the family Tortricidae. It is found in Nigeria.

The wingspan is about 14 mm.

== Etymology ==
The species name refers to Iita, the type locality.
