= Macella =

Scientific classification
- Kingdom: Animalia
- Phylum: Arthropoda
- Class: Insecta
- Order: Lepidoptera
- Superfamily: Noctuoidea
- Family: Erebidae
- Subfamily: Calpinae
- Genus: Macella; Walker, 1859

Synonyms
- Eucapnodes Holland, 1894

Genus of moths

Macella is a genus of moths of the family Erebidae. The genus was erected by Francis Walker in 1859.

Macella is the plural of macellum, a market of ancient Rome.

== Species ==
- Macella euritiusalis Walker, 1858
- Macella flavithorax Gaede, 1940
- Macella sexmaculata Holland, 1894
- Macella sideris Holland, 1894
