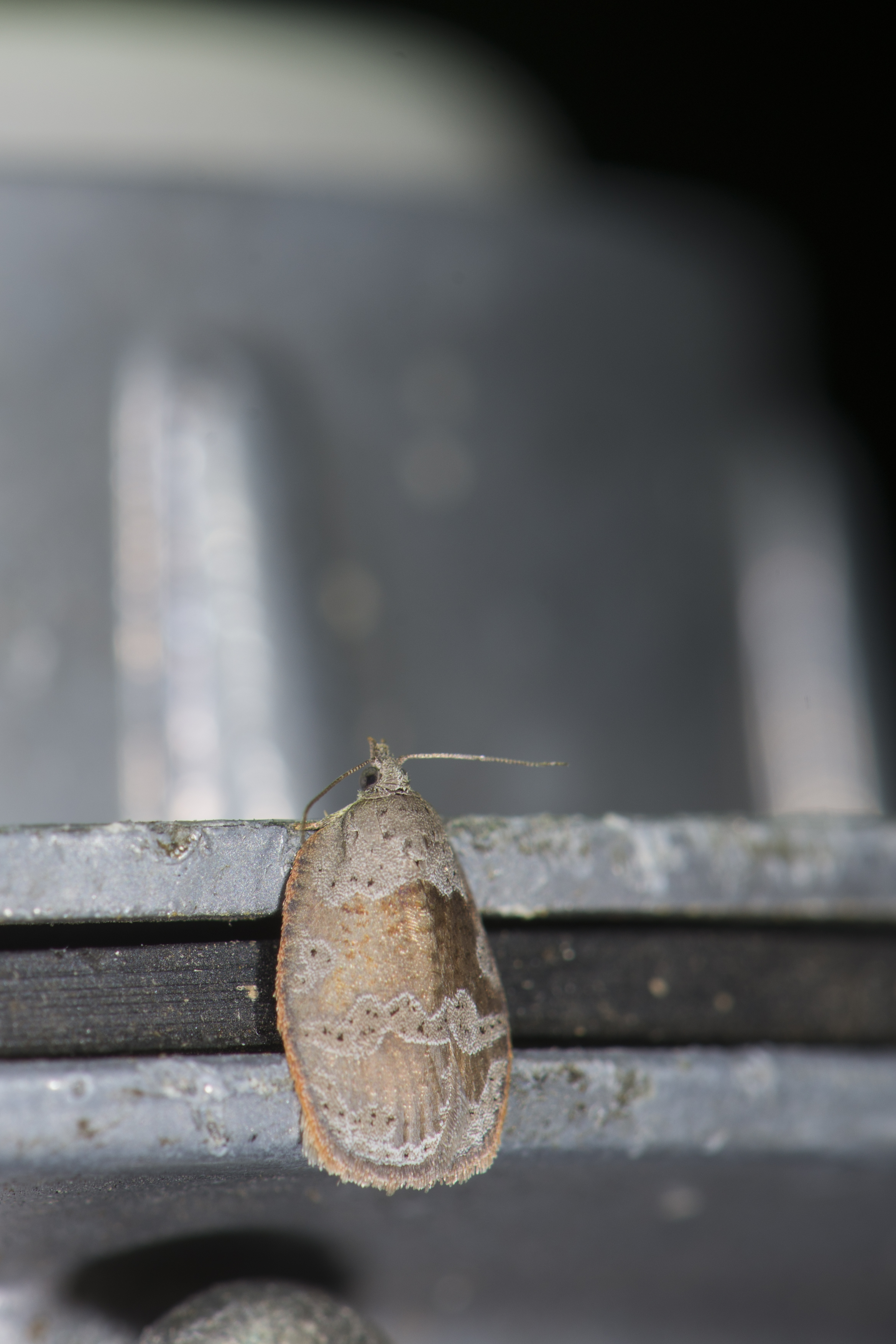

Scientific classification
- Kingdom: Animalia
- Phylum: Arthropoda
- Class: Insecta
- Order: Lepidoptera
- Family: Tortricidae
- Genus: Ebodina
- Species: E. elephantodes

Binomial name
- Ebodina elephantodes (Meyrick, 1938)

Synonyms
- Schoenotenes discreta Diakonoff, 1941

= Ebodina elephantodes =

Species of moth

Ebodina elephantodes is a moth of the family Tortricidae. It is found in Java and Taiwan.
