= Acanthofrontia lithosiana =

Scientific classification
- Kingdom: Animalia
- Phylum: Arthropoda
- Class: Insecta
- Order: Lepidoptera
- Superfamily: Noctuoidea
- Family: Erebidae
- Subfamily: Arctiinae
- Genus: Acanthofrontia
- Species: A. lithosiana

Binomial name
- Acanthofrontia lithosiana Hampson, 1910

Species of moth

Acanthofrontia lithosiana is a moth of the subfamily Arctiinae. It was described by George Hampson in 1910. It is found in Kenya.
