= Ebodina circensis =

Scientific classification
- Kingdom: Animalia
- Phylum: Arthropoda
- Class: Insecta
- Order: Lepidoptera
- Family: Tortricidae
- Genus: Ebodina
- Species: E. circensis

Binomial name
- Ebodina circensis (Meyrick, 1928)

Synonyms
- Schoenotenes circensis Meyrick, 1928

Species of moth

Ebodina circensis is a species of moth of the family Tortricidae. It is found in Papua New Guinea.
