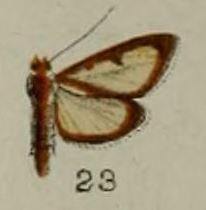
- Hyalea pallidalis

Scientific classification
- Domain: Eukaryota
- Kingdom: Animalia
- Phylum: Arthropoda
- Class: Insecta
- Order: Lepidoptera
- Family: Crambidae
- Subfamily: Pyraustinae
- Genus: Hyalea; Guenée, 1854

= Hyalea =

Genus of moths

Hyalea is a genus of large moths of the family Crambidae. It was described by Achille Guenée in 1854.

== Species ==
- Hyalea africalis Hampson, 1912
- Hyalea boliviensis Dognin, 1905
- Hyalea dividalis Geyer in Hübner, 1832 (Brazil)
- Hyalea glaucopidalis Guenée, 1854
- Hyalea pallidalis Hampson, 1898 (Brazil/Peru)
- Hyalea succinalis Guenée, 1854 (Brazil)
