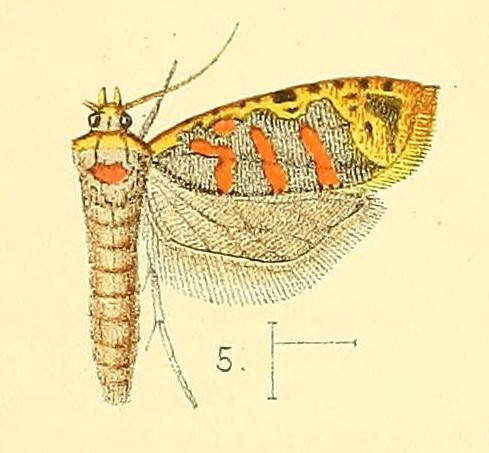

Scientific classification
- Kingdom: Animalia
- Phylum: Arthropoda
- Class: Insecta
- Order: Lepidoptera
- Family: Tortricidae
- Genus: Sanguinograptis
- Species: S. albardana

Binomial name
- Sanguinograptis albardana (Snellen, 1872)

Synonyms
- Tortrix albardana Snellen, 1872; Cochylis tricolor Walsingham, 1891

= Sanguinograptis albardana =

Species of moth

Sanguinograptis albardana is a species of moth of the family Tortricidae. It is found in the Republic of Congo, the Democratic Republic of Congo, Equatorial Guinea, Guinea and Gambia.

The wingspan is about 10 mm. The costal and apical portions of the forewings are orange, the extreme costal margin dotted irregularly throughout with leaden grey. There is a large reniform leaden grey spot before the apex, not reaching the costa, but attenuated downwards to the apical margin above the anal angle, as well as a large leaden grey patch extending from the base nearly to the anal angle, occupying three-fourths of the width of the wing, and approaching the costa at its upper and outer angle at two-thirds from the base, its upper and outer edges irregularly sinuous and clearly defined, the outer edge somewhat transverse and oblique. This leaden patch contains three transverse bright vermilion bars, not reaching to its upper edge, and a spot of the same colour. The first bar near the base touching the dorsal margin is angulated outwards on the fold, the second bar tends a little obliquely inwards from the middle of the dorsal margin and is attenuated at a point a little above the fold. The third bar starts erect from the dorsal margin and is dilated and bent a little inwards at half its length. Between the first and second bar, and almost touching the orange costal border, lies a nearly circular spot containing a few black scales before its upper edge, which is narrowly margined with orange. The hindwings are brownish fuscous.
