= Hyalea glaucopidalis =

Scientific classification
- Kingdom: Animalia
- Phylum: Arthropoda
- Class: Insecta
- Order: Lepidoptera
- Family: Crambidae
- Genus: Hyalea
- Species: H. glaucopidalis

Binomial name
- Hyalea glaucopidalis Guenée, 1854

Synonyms
- Syllepte glaucopidalis

Species of moth

Hyalea glaucopidalis is a moth in the family Crambidae. It was described by Achille Guenée in 1854.
