= Scopula vicina (Gaede, 1917) =

Scientific classification
- Kingdom: Animalia
- Phylum: Arthropoda
- Class: Insecta
- Order: Lepidoptera
- Family: Geometridae
- Genus: Scopula
- Species: S. vicina

Binomial name
- Scopula vicina (Gaede, 1917)

Synonyms
- Aletis vicina Gaede, 1917

Species of geometer moth in subfamily Sterrhinae

Scopula vicina is a moth of the family Geometridae found in Nigeria.

== Taxonomy ==
Scopula vicina is a junior secondary homonym of Trygodes vicina described by Paul Thierry-Mieg in 1907 and requires a replacement name.
