= Acanthofrontia bianulata =

Scientific classification
- Kingdom: Animalia
- Phylum: Arthropoda
- Class: Insecta
- Order: Lepidoptera
- Superfamily: Noctuoidea
- Family: Erebidae
- Subfamily: Arctiinae
- Genus: Acanthofrontia
- Species: A. bianulata

Binomial name
- Acanthofrontia bianulata (Wichgraf, 1922)

Synonyms
- Aglossosia bianulata Wichgraf, 1922

Species of moth

Acanthofrontia bianulata is a moth of the subfamily Arctiinae. It is found in Tanzania.
