= Rubidograptis =

Scientific classification
- Kingdom: Animalia
- Phylum: Arthropoda
- Class: Insecta
- Order: Lepidoptera
- Family: Tortricidae
- Tribe: Tortricini
- Genus: Rubidograptis; Razowski, 1981

Genus of tortrix moths

Rubidograptis is a genus of moths belonging to the family Tortricidae.

== Species ==
- Rubidograptis praeconia (Meyrick, 1937)
- Rubidograptis regulus Razowski, 1981

== See also ==
- List of Tortricidae genera
