= Plinthograptis ebogana =

Scientific classification
- Domain: Eukaryota
- Kingdom: Animalia
- Phylum: Arthropoda
- Class: Insecta
- Order: Lepidoptera
- Family: Tortricidae
- Genus: Plinthograptis
- Species: P. ebogana

Binomial name
- Plinthograptis ebogana Razowski, 2005

Species of moth

Plinthograptis ebogana is a species of moth of the family Tortricidae. It is found in Cameroon and Ghana.

Its wingspan is about 15 mm. There are red markings. The hindwings are brown.

The larvae feed on Theobroma cacao.
