= Rutilograptis =

Scientific classification
- Kingdom: Animalia
- Phylum: Arthropoda
- Class: Insecta
- Order: Lepidoptera
- Family: Tortricidae
- Tribe: Tortricini
- Genus: Rutilograptis; Razowski, 1981

Genus of tortrix moths

Rutilograptis is a genus of moths belonging to the family Tortricidae.

== Species ==
- Rutilograptis cornesi Razowski, 1981
- Rutilograptis couteauxi (Ghesquire, 1940)

== See also ==
- List of Tortricidae genera
