= Panegyra cosmophora =

Scientific classification
- Domain: Eukaryota
- Kingdom: Animalia
- Phylum: Arthropoda
- Class: Insecta
- Order: Lepidoptera
- Family: Tortricidae
- Genus: Panegyra
- Species: P. cosmophora

Binomial name
- Panegyra cosmophora Diakonoff, 1960

Species of moth

Panegyra cosmophora is a species of moth of the family Tortricidae. It is found in Madagascar.
