= Eilema mesosticta =

Scientific classification
- Kingdom: Animalia
- Phylum: Arthropoda
- Class: Insecta
- Order: Lepidoptera
- Superfamily: Noctuoidea
- Family: Erebidae
- Subfamily: Arctiinae
- Genus: Eilema
- Species: E. mesosticta

Binomial name
- Eilema mesosticta (Hampson, 1911)

Synonyms
- Ilema mesosticta Hampson, 1911; Ilema divisa Gaede, 1924; Crocosia phaeocraspis Hampson, 1914; Crocosia mesosticta (Hampson, 1911)

Species of moth

Eilema mesosticta is a moth of the subfamily Arctiinae. It was described by George Hampson in 1911. It is found in Cameroon, the Democratic Republic of the Congo, Ghana, Nigeria and Uganda.
