= Hyalea africalis =

Scientific classification
- Kingdom: Animalia
- Phylum: Arthropoda
- Class: Insecta
- Order: Lepidoptera
- Family: Crambidae
- Genus: Hyalea
- Species: H. africalis

Binomial name
- Hyalea africalis Hampson, 1912

Species of moth

Hyalea africalis is a moth in the family Crambidae. It was described by George Hampson in 1912. It is found in Nigeria.
