= Rubidograptis praeconia =

Scientific classification
- Kingdom: Animalia
- Phylum: Arthropoda
- Class: Insecta
- Order: Lepidoptera
- Family: Tortricidae
- Genus: Rubidograptis
- Species: R. praeconia

Binomial name
- Rubidograptis praeconia (Meyrick, 1937)

Synonyms
- Argyrotoxa praeconia Meyrick, 1937; Polemograptis praeconia; Russograptis praeconia; Plinthograptis praeconia

Species of moth

Rubidograptis praeconia is a species of moth of the family Tortricidae. It is found in the Democratic Republic of the Congo.

The larvae have been recorded feeding on Stictococcus species.
