= Archithosia flavifrontella =

Scientific classification
- Domain: Eukaryota
- Kingdom: Animalia
- Phylum: Arthropoda
- Class: Insecta
- Order: Lepidoptera
- Superfamily: Noctuoidea
- Family: Erebidae
- Subfamily: Arctiinae
- Genus: Archithosia
- Species: A. flavifrontella

Binomial name
- Archithosia flavifrontella (Strand, 1912)

Synonyms
- Phryganopsis flavifrontella Strand, 1912

Species of moth

Archithosia flavifrontella is a moth of the subfamily Arctiinae. It was described by Embrik Strand in 1912. It is found in Equatorial Guinea, Nigeria and Uganda.
