= Plinthograptis rhytisma =

Scientific classification
- Domain: Eukaryota
- Kingdom: Animalia
- Phylum: Arthropoda
- Class: Insecta
- Order: Lepidoptera
- Family: Tortricidae
- Genus: Plinthograptis
- Species: P. rhytisma

Binomial name
- Plinthograptis rhytisma Razowski, 1981

Species of moth

Plinthograptis rhytisma is a species of moth of the family Tortricidae. It is found in Nigeria.

The length of the forewings is about 4 mm.
