= Scopula haemaleata =

Scientific classification
- Kingdom: Animalia
- Phylum: Arthropoda
- Class: Insecta
- Order: Lepidoptera
- Family: Geometridae
- Genus: Scopula
- Species: S. haemaleata

Binomial name
- Scopula haemaleata (Warren, 1898)

Synonyms
- Craspedia haemaleata Warren, 1898

Species of geometer moth in subfamily Sterrhinae

Scopula haemaleata is a moth of the family Geometridae found in Nigeria.
