= Paratraea plumbipicta =

Scientific classification
- Kingdom: Animalia
- Phylum: Arthropoda
- Class: Insecta
- Order: Lepidoptera
- Family: Crambidae
- Subfamily: Crambinae
- Tribe: incertae sedis
- Genus: Paratraea
- Species: P. plumbipicta

Binomial name
- Paratraea plumbipicta Hampson, 1919

Species of moth

Paratraea plumbipicta is a moth in the family Crambidae. It was described by George Hampson in 1919. It is found in Nigeria.
