= Scopula aphercta =

Scientific classification
- Kingdom: Animalia
- Phylum: Arthropoda
- Class: Insecta
- Order: Lepidoptera
- Family: Geometridae
- Genus: Scopula
- Species: S. aphercta

Binomial name
- Scopula aphercta Prout, 1932

Species of geometer moth in subfamily Sterrhinae

Scopula aphercta is a moth of the family Geometridae. It was described by Prout in 1932. It is found in Nigeria, Democratic Republic of Congo and Uganda.
