= Rubrograptis recrudescentia =

Scientific classification
- Kingdom: Animalia
- Phylum: Arthropoda
- Class: Insecta
- Order: Lepidoptera
- Family: Tortricidae
- Genus: Rubrograptis
- Species: R. recrudescentia

Binomial name
- Rubrograptis recrudescentia Razowski, 1981

Species of moth

Rubrograptis recrudescentia is a species of moth of the family Tortricidae. It is found in Nigeria and Benin.

The length of the forewings is 4–5 mm.
