= Sanguinograptis ochrolegnia =

Scientific classification
- Kingdom: Animalia
- Phylum: Arthropoda
- Class: Insecta
- Order: Lepidoptera
- Family: Tortricidae
- Genus: Sanguinograptis
- Species: S. ochrolegnia

Binomial name
- Sanguinograptis ochrolegnia Razowski, 1986

Species of moth

Sanguinograptis ochrolegnia is a species of moth of the family Tortricidae. It is found in Cameroon and Nigeria.

The wingspan is about 12 mm.
