= Scopula flavissima =

Scientific classification
- Kingdom: Animalia
- Phylum: Arthropoda
- Class: Insecta
- Order: Lepidoptera
- Family: Geometridae
- Genus: Scopula
- Species: S. flavissima

Binomial name
- Scopula flavissima (Warren, 1898)

Synonyms
- Craspedia flavissima Warren, 1898

Species of geometer moth in subfamily Sterrhinae

Scopula flavissima is a moth of the family Geometridae. It was described by Warren in 1898. It is endemic to Nigeria.
