= Russograptis callopista =

Scientific classification
- Domain: Eukaryota
- Kingdom: Animalia
- Phylum: Arthropoda
- Class: Insecta
- Order: Lepidoptera
- Family: Tortricidae
- Genus: Russograptis
- Species: R. callopista

Binomial name
- Russograptis callopista (Durrant, 1913)

Synonyms
- Tortrix callopista Durrant, 1913

Species of moth

Russograptis callopista is a species of moth of the family Tortricidae. It is found in the Democratic Republic of Congo (Equateur) and Nigeria.

The larvae feed from Stictococcus sjoestedti.
