= Scopula vicina =

Scientific classification
- Kingdom: Animalia
- Phylum: Arthropoda
- Class: Insecta
- Order: Lepidoptera
- Family: Geometridae
- Genus: Scopula
- Species: S. vicina

Binomial name
- Scopula vicina (Thierry Mieg, 1907)

Synonyms
- Trygodes vicina Thierry-Mieg, 1907; Antitrygodes vicina; Antitrygodes agrata vicina

Species of geometer moth in subfamily Sterrhinae

Scopula vicina is a moth of the family Geometridae. It is found in the north-eastern Himalaya, China, the Moluccas and Malaysia.
