= Scopula elegans =

Scientific classification
- Kingdom: Animalia
- Phylum: Arthropoda
- Clade: Pancrustacea
- Class: Insecta
- Order: Lepidoptera
- Family: Geometridae
- Genus: Scopula
- Species: S. elegans

Binomial name
- Scopula elegans (Prout, 1915)

Synonyms
- Acidalia elegans Prout, 1915

Species of geometer moth in subfamily Sterrhinae

Scopula elegans is a moth of the family Geometridae.

== Distribution ==
It is found in Malawi, Nigeria and Uganda.
