= Scopula habilis =

Scientific classification
- Kingdom: Animalia
- Phylum: Arthropoda
- Class: Insecta
- Order: Lepidoptera
- Family: Geometridae
- Genus: Scopula
- Species: S. habilis

Binomial name
- Scopula habilis (Warren, 1899)

Synonyms
- Craspedia habilis Warren, 1899

Species of geometer moth in subfamily Sterrhinae

Scopula habilis is a moth of the family Geometridae. It is found in Nigeria.
