= Caloptilia prosticta =

Scientific classification
- Kingdom: Animalia
- Phylum: Arthropoda
- Clade: Pancrustacea
- Class: Insecta
- Order: Lepidoptera
- Family: Gracillariidae
- Genus: Caloptilia
- Species: C. prosticta

Binomial name
- Caloptilia prosticta (Meyrick, 1909)

Synonyms
- Gracilaria prosticta Meyrick, 1909

Species of moth

Caloptilia prosticta is a moth of the family Gracillariidae. It is known from Madagascar, Nigeria, the Seychelles, South Africa and Sri Lanka.

== Host plants ==
Host plants of this species are : Cajanus cajani, Vigna unguiculata and Rhynchosia caribaea (Fabaceae)
