= Plinthograptis clyster =

Scientific classification
- Kingdom: Animalia
- Phylum: Arthropoda
- Clade: Pancrustacea
- Class: Insecta
- Order: Lepidoptera
- Family: Tortricidae
- Genus: Plinthograptis
- Species: P. clyster

Binomial name
- Plinthograptis clyster Razowski, 1990

Species of moth

Plinthograptis clyster is a species of moth of the family Tortricidae. It is found in Nigeria.

The wingspan is about 9 mm.
