= Pseudomelittia cingulata =

Scientific classification
- Kingdom: Animalia
- Phylum: Arthropoda
- Class: Insecta
- Order: Lepidoptera
- Family: Sesiidae
- Genus: Pseudomelittia
- Species: P. cingulata

Binomial name
- Pseudomelittia cingulata Gaede, 1929

Species of moth

Pseudomelittia cingulata is a moth of the family Sesiidae. It is known from Nigeria.
