= Rutilograptis cornesi =

Scientific classification
- Kingdom: Animalia
- Phylum: Arthropoda
- Class: Insecta
- Order: Lepidoptera
- Family: Tortricidae
- Genus: Rutilograptis
- Species: R. cornesi

Binomial name
- Rutilograptis cornesi Razowski, 1981

Species of moth

Rutilograptis cornesi is a species of moth in the family Tortricidae. It is found in Nigeria.

The length of the forewings is approximately 6 mm (0.24 in).
