= Ebodina lagoana =

Scientific classification
- Kingdom: Animalia
- Phylum: Arthropoda
- Class: Insecta
- Order: Lepidoptera
- Family: Tortricidae
- Genus: Ebodina
- Species: E. lagoana

Binomial name
- Ebodina lagoana Razowski & Tuck, 2000

Species of moth

Ebodina lagoana is a species of moth of the family Tortricidae. It is found in Nigeria.
