= Panegyra sectatrix =

Scientific classification
- Kingdom: Animalia
- Phylum: Arthropoda
- Class: Insecta
- Order: Lepidoptera
- Family: Tortricidae
- Genus: Panegyra
- Species: P. sectatrix

Binomial name
- Panegyra sectatrix (Razowski, 1981)

Synonyms
- Heterograptis sectatrix Razowski, 1981

Species of moth

Panegyra sectatrix is a species of moth of the family Tortricidae. It is found in Nigeria.
