= Phyllonorycter caudasimplex =

Scientific classification
- Kingdom: Animalia
- Phylum: Arthropoda
- Class: Insecta
- Order: Lepidoptera
- Family: Gracillariidae
- Genus: Phyllonorycter
- Species: P. caudasimplex

Binomial name
- Phyllonorycter caudasimplex Bland, 1980

Species of moth

Phyllonorycter caudasimplex is a moth from the family Gracillariidae. It is known from Nigeria.

The wingspan is 7 mm (0.28 in) (holotype, female). The length of the forewings is 3.2 mm.

The larvae recorded on Dombeya acutangula and Ruizia cordata are based on a misidentification of Phyllonorycter ruizivorus.
