= Scopula ossicolor =

Scientific classification
- Kingdom: Animalia
- Phylum: Arthropoda
- Class: Insecta
- Order: Lepidoptera
- Family: Geometridae
- Genus: Scopula
- Species: S. ossicolor

Binomial name
- Scopula ossicolor (Warren, 1897)

Synonyms
- Craspedia ossicolor Warren, 1897; Craspedia submarginata Warren, 1898

Species of geometer moth in subfamily Sterrhinae

Scopula ossicolor is a moth of the family Geometridae. It is found in Kenya, Nigeria and Sierra Leone.
