= Rubidograptis regulus =

Scientific classification
- Domain: Eukaryota
- Kingdom: Animalia
- Phylum: Arthropoda
- Class: Insecta
- Order: Lepidoptera
- Family: Tortricidae
- Genus: Rubidograptis
- Species: R. regulus

Binomial name
- Rubidograptis regulus Razowski, 1981

Species of moth

Rubidograptis regulus is a species of moth of the family Tortricidae. It is found in Nigeria.

The length of the forewings is about 6 mm.
