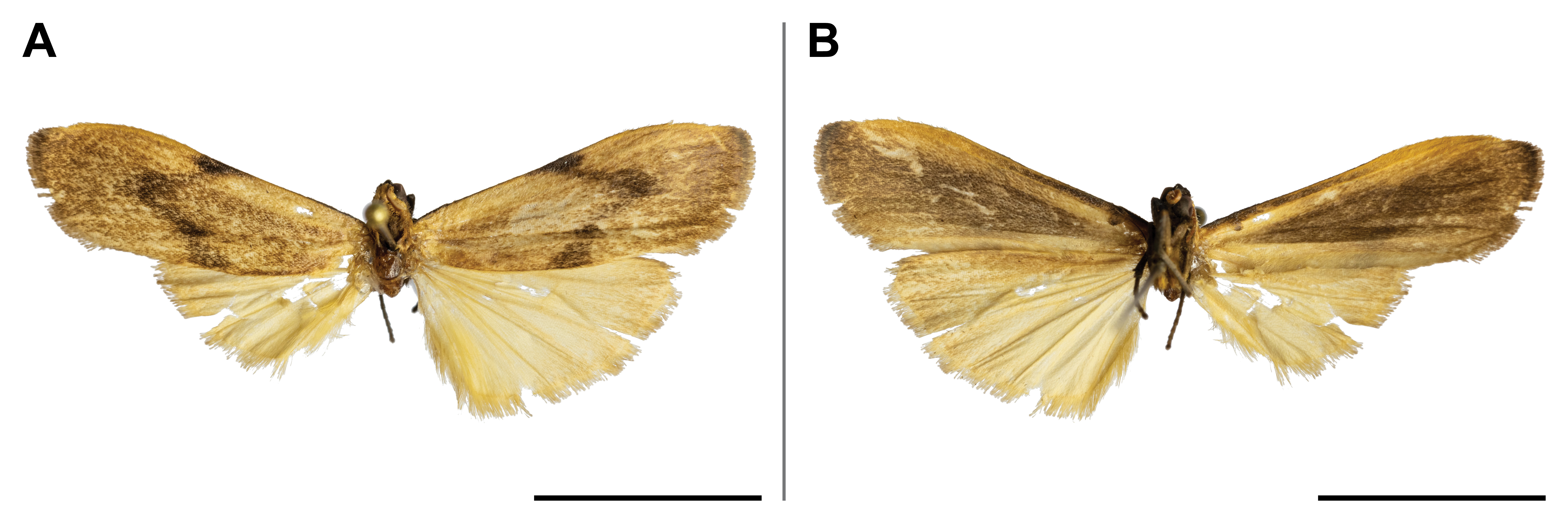

Scientific classification
- Domain: Eukaryota
- Kingdom: Animalia
- Phylum: Arthropoda
- Class: Insecta
- Order: Lepidoptera
- Superfamily: Noctuoidea
- Family: Erebidae
- Subfamily: Arctiinae
- Genus: Archithosia
- Species: A. makomensis

Binomial name
- Archithosia makomensis (Strand, 1912)

Synonyms
- Eilema makomensis Strand, 1912; Ilema fuscicorpus Hampson, 1914; Phryganopsis jaundeana Strand, 1912

= Archithosia makomensis =

Species of moth

Archithosia makomensis is a moth of the subfamily Arctiinae. It was described by Strand in 1912. It is found in Cameroon, Equatorial Guinea, Ghana and Nigeria.
