= Plinthograptis clostos =

Scientific classification
- Domain: Eukaryota
- Kingdom: Animalia
- Phylum: Arthropoda
- Class: Insecta
- Order: Lepidoptera
- Family: Tortricidae
- Genus: Plinthograptis
- Species: P. clostos

Binomial name
- Plinthograptis clostos Razowski, 1990

Species of moth

Plinthograptis clostos is a species of moth of the family Tortricidae. It is found in Nigeria.

The wingspan is about 10 mm.
