= Scopula transsecta =

Scientific classification
- Kingdom: Animalia
- Phylum: Arthropoda
- Class: Insecta
- Order: Lepidoptera
- Family: Geometridae
- Genus: Scopula
- Species: S. transsecta

Binomial name
- Scopula transsecta (Warren, 1898)

Synonyms
- Craspedia transsecta Warren, 1898; Craspedia dissimulans Warren, 1899

Species of geometer moth in subfamily Sterrhinae

Scopula transsecta is a moth of the family Geometridae. It is found in Nigeria.

== Subspecies ==
- Scopula transsecta transsecta
- Scopula transsecta dissimulans (Warren, 1899)
