= Macella euritiusalis =

Scientific classification
- Kingdom: Animalia
- Phylum: Arthropoda
- Class: Insecta
- Order: Lepidoptera
- Superfamily: Noctuoidea
- Family: Erebidae
- Genus: Macella
- Species: M. euritiusalis

Binomial name
- Macella euritiusalis (Walker, 1859)

Synonyms
- Capnodes euritiusalis; Capnodes consocia (Walker, 1865); Capnodes disticha (Saalmüller, 1891); Capnodes excentrica (Karsch, 1896); Eucapnodes megalosara (Bethune-Baker, 1911); Capnodes sexmaculata (Walker, 1865); Capnodes trinotata (Walker, 1869); Capnodes margineguttata (Heyden, 1891)

Species of moth

Macella euritiusalis is a moth of the family Erebidae first described by Francis Walker in 1859. It is known from the Cameroon, Democratic Republic of the Congo, Nigeria, Sierra Leone, Togo and from Madagascar.

The wingspan of this species is around 32–34 mm.
