= Phaeoscia =

Scientific classification
- Kingdom: Animalia
- Phylum: Arthropoda
- Class: Insecta
- Order: Lepidoptera
- Superfamily: Noctuoidea
- Family: Erebidae
- Subfamily: Calpinae
- Genus: Phaeoscia; Hampson, 1926
- Species: P. canipars

Binomial name
- Phaeoscia canipars Hampson, 1926

Genus of moths

Phaeoscia is a monotypic moth genus of the family Erebidae. Its only species, Phaeoscia canipars, is found in Nigeria and Uganda. Both the genus and species were first described by George Hampson in 1926.
