= Plinthograptis pleroma =

Scientific classification
- Domain: Eukaryota
- Kingdom: Animalia
- Phylum: Arthropoda
- Class: Insecta
- Order: Lepidoptera
- Family: Tortricidae
- Genus: Plinthograptis
- Species: P. pleroma

Binomial name
- Plinthograptis pleroma Razowski, 1981

Species of moth

Plinthograptis pleroma is a species of moth of the family Tortricidae. It is found in Nigeria.

The length of the forewings is about 5 mm.
