= Parerupa distictalis =

Scientific classification
- Kingdom: Animalia
- Phylum: Arthropoda
- Clade: Pancrustacea
- Class: Insecta
- Order: Lepidoptera
- Family: Crambidae
- Subfamily: Crambinae
- Tribe: incertae sedis
- Genus: Parerupa
- Species: P. distictalis

Binomial name
- Parerupa distictalis (Hampson, 1919)

Synonyms
- Coenotalis distictalis Hampson, 1919

Species of moth

Parerupa distictalis is a moth in the family Crambidae. It was described by George Hampson in 1919. It is found in Nigeria.
