= Eilema albidula =

Scientific classification
- Kingdom: Animalia
- Phylum: Arthropoda
- Class: Insecta
- Order: Lepidoptera
- Superfamily: Noctuoidea
- Family: Erebidae
- Subfamily: Arctiinae
- Genus: Eilema
- Species: E. albidula

Binomial name
- Eilema albidula (Walker, 1864)

Synonyms
- Lithosia albidula Walker, 1864

Species of moth

Eilema albidula is a moth of the subfamily Arctiinae first described by Francis Walker in 1864. It is found in the Democratic Republic of the Congo, Nigeria and Sierra Leone.
