= Conopsia lambornella =

Scientific classification
- Kingdom: Animalia
- Phylum: Arthropoda
- Class: Insecta
- Order: Lepidoptera
- Family: Sesiidae
- Genus: Conopsia
- Species: C. lambornella

Binomial name
- Conopsia lambornella (Durrant, 1914)

Synonyms
- Tinthia lambornella Durrant, 1914; Trichocerata lambornella

Species of moth

Conopsia lambornella is a moth of the family Sesiidae. It is known from Nigeria.
