= Sanguinograptis obtrecator =

Scientific classification
- Kingdom: Animalia
- Phylum: Arthropoda
- Class: Insecta
- Order: Lepidoptera
- Family: Tortricidae
- Genus: Sanguinograptis
- Species: S. obtrecator

Binomial name
- Sanguinograptis obtrecator Razowski, 1981

Species of moth

Sanguinograptis obtrecator is a species of moth of the family Tortricidae. It is found in Nigeria.

The length of the forewings is about 4 mm.
