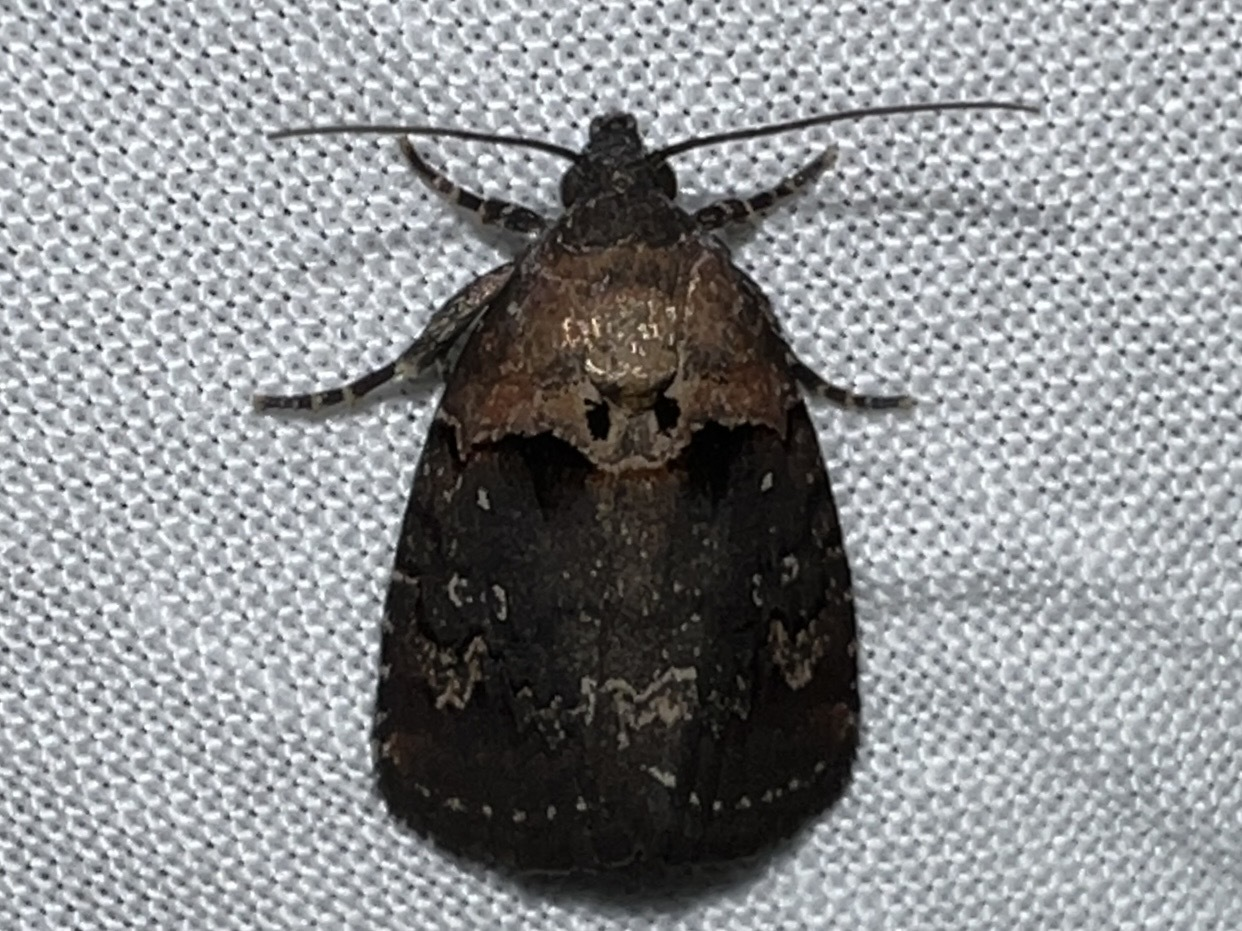

Scientific classification
- Kingdom: Animalia
- Phylum: Arthropoda
- Clade: Pancrustacea
- Class: Insecta
- Order: Lepidoptera
- Superfamily: Noctuoidea
- Family: Noctuidae
- Genus: Cretonia
- Species: C. platyphaeella

Binomial name
- Cretonia platyphaeella Walker, 1866

= Cretonia platyphaeella =

Species of African moth

Cretonia platyphaeella is a moth in the family Noctuidae, it was described by Francis Walker in 1866.

== Range ==
This species is found in Gambia, Nigeria, and Sierra Leone.
