= Gambiae (disambiguation) =

gambiae is most commonly is used as a short name for:

- Anopheles gambiae

It is a Latin word meaning "of The Gambia". It is also the specific epithet of other insects:

- Euriphene gambiae
- Pseudeboda gambiae
