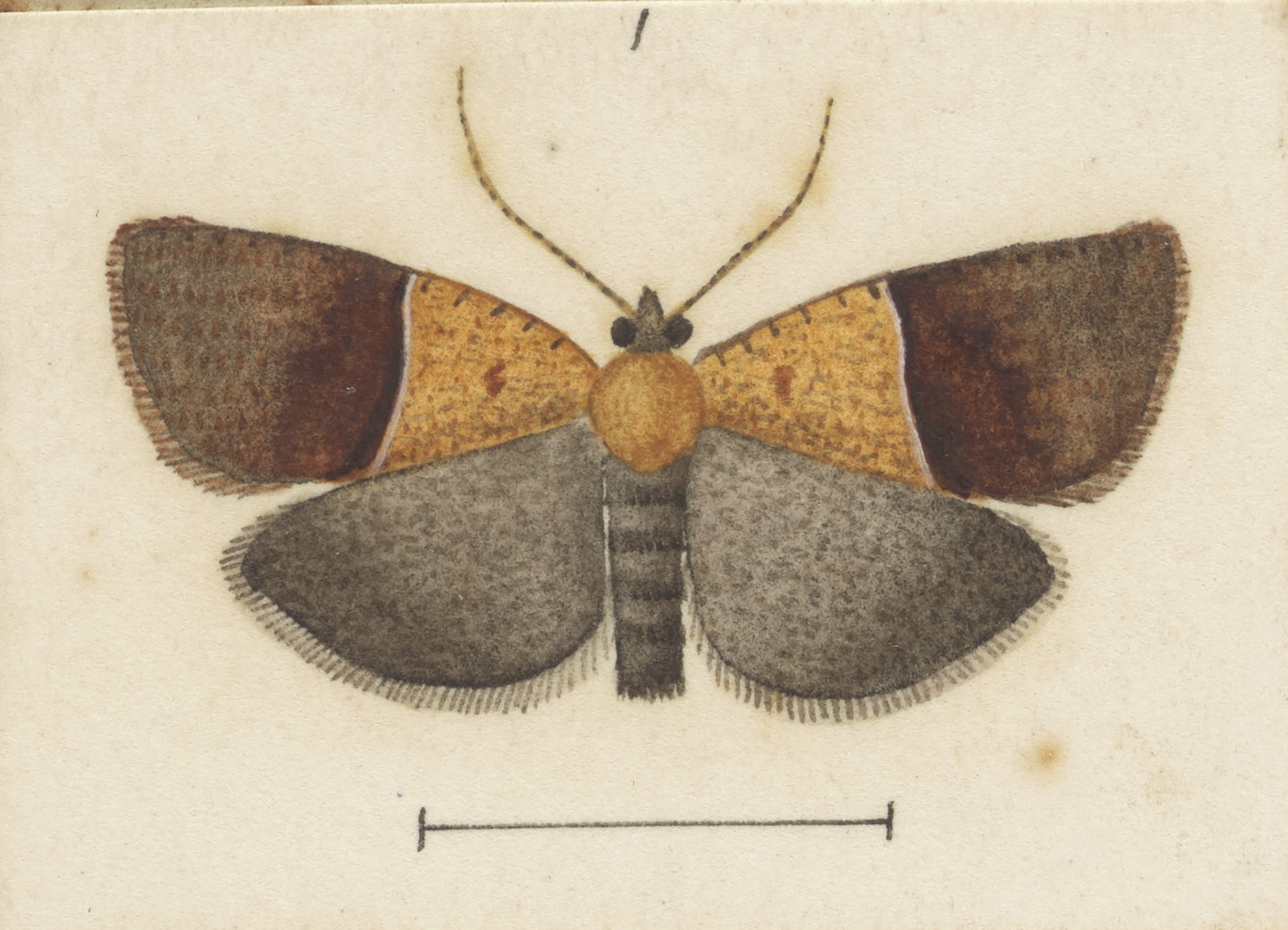

Scientific classification
- Kingdom: Animalia
- Phylum: Arthropoda
- Class: Insecta
- Order: Lepidoptera
- Family: Tortricidae
- Genus: Tortrix
- Species: T. antichroa

Binomial name
- Tortrix antichroa Meyrick, 1919

= Tortrix antichroa =

Species of moth, endemic to New Zealand

Tortrix antichroa is a species of moth of the family Tortricidae. It is endemic to New Zealand. It is likely that this species probably belongs to another genus and as such this species is also known as Tortrix (s.l.) antichroa.
