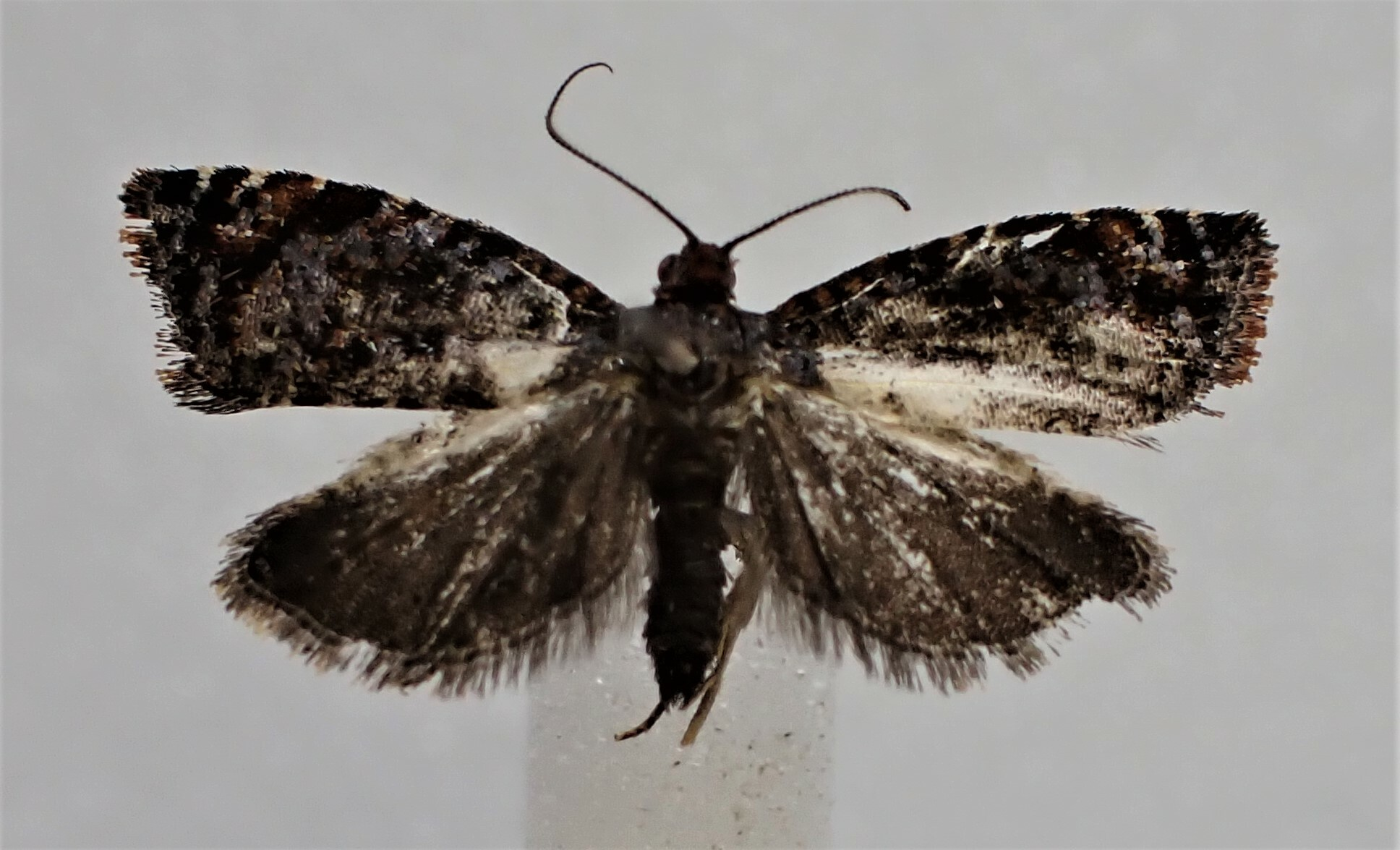

Scientific classification
- Kingdom: Animalia
- Phylum: Arthropoda
- Class: Insecta
- Order: Lepidoptera
- Family: Tortricidae
- Genus: Tortrix
- Species: T. incendiaria

Binomial name
- Tortrix incendiaria Meyrick, 1923

= Tortrix incendiaria =

Species of moth, endemic to New Zealand

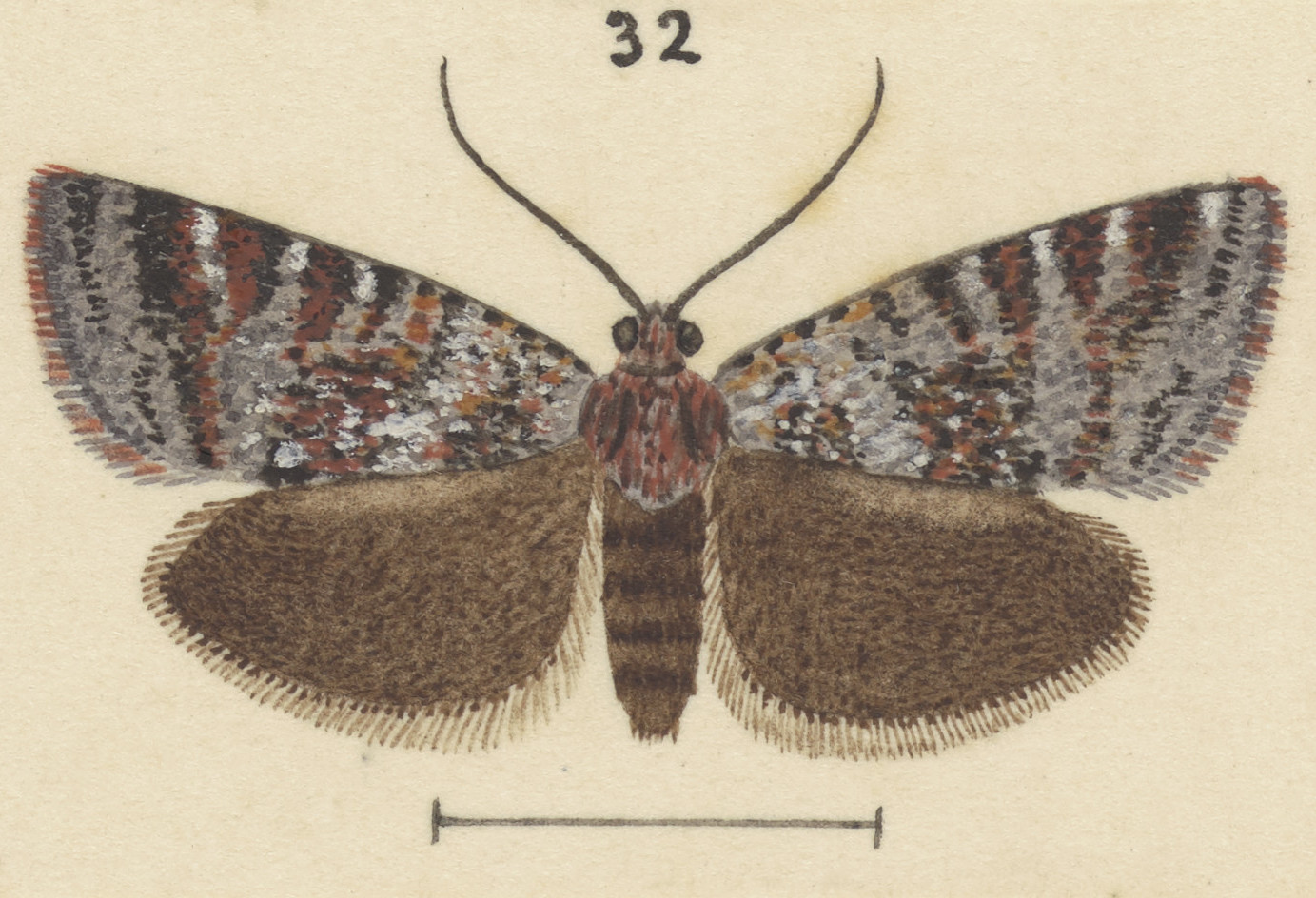
Illustration of female

Tortrix incendiaria is a species of moth of the family Tortricidae. It is endemic to New Zealand. It is likely that this species probably belongs to another genus and as such this species is also known as Tortrix (s.l.) incendiaria.
