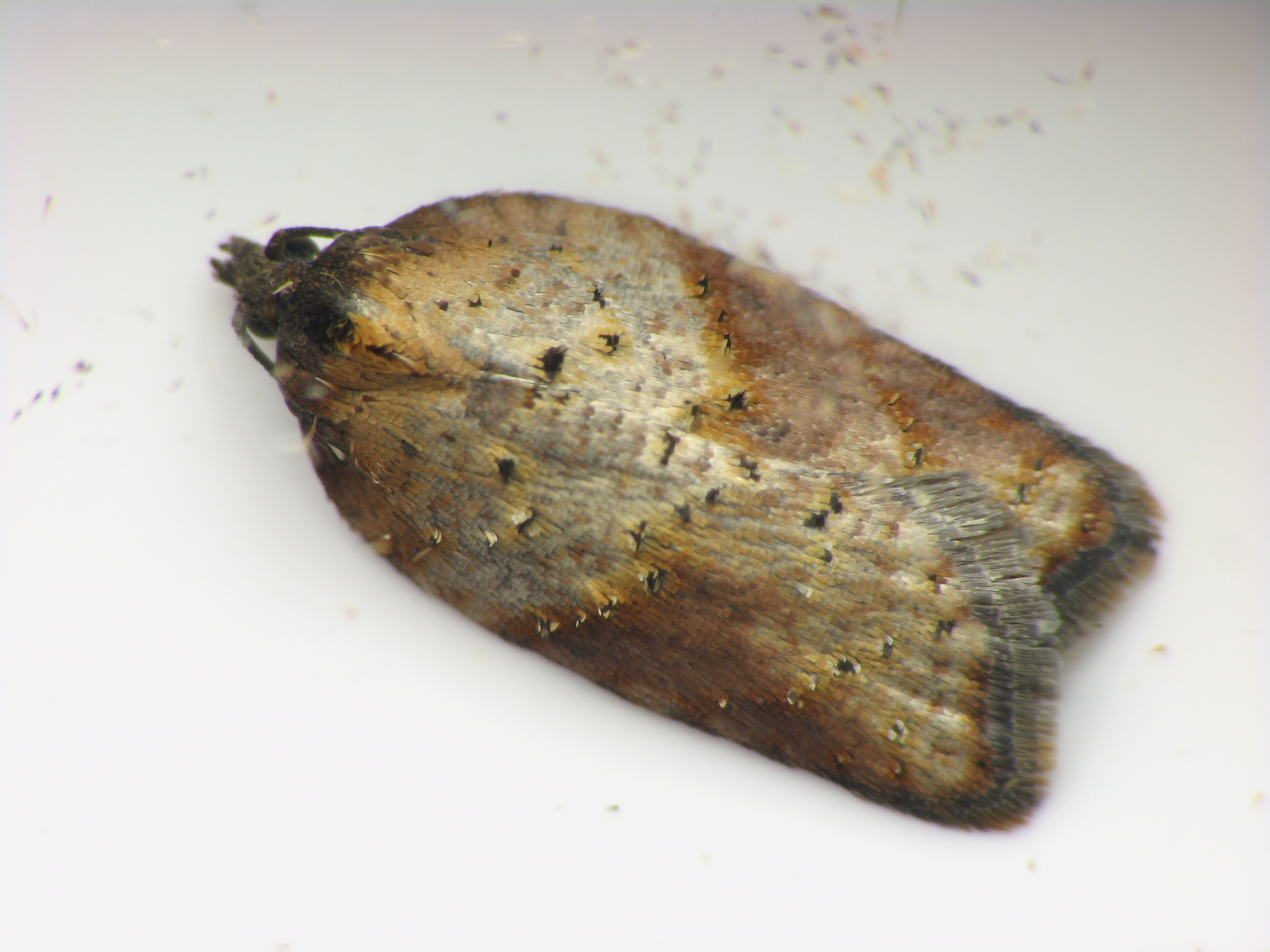
- Acleris schalleriana

Scientific classification
- Kingdom: Animalia
- Phylum: Arthropoda
- Clade: Pancrustacea
- Class: Insecta
- Order: Lepidoptera
- Family: Tortricidae
- Subfamily: Tortricinae
- Tribe: Tortricini; Latreille, 1803

Genera
- See text

Synonyms
- Peroneidae Stainton, [1858]; Chimatophilidae Kirby, 1897

= Tortricini =

Tribe of moths

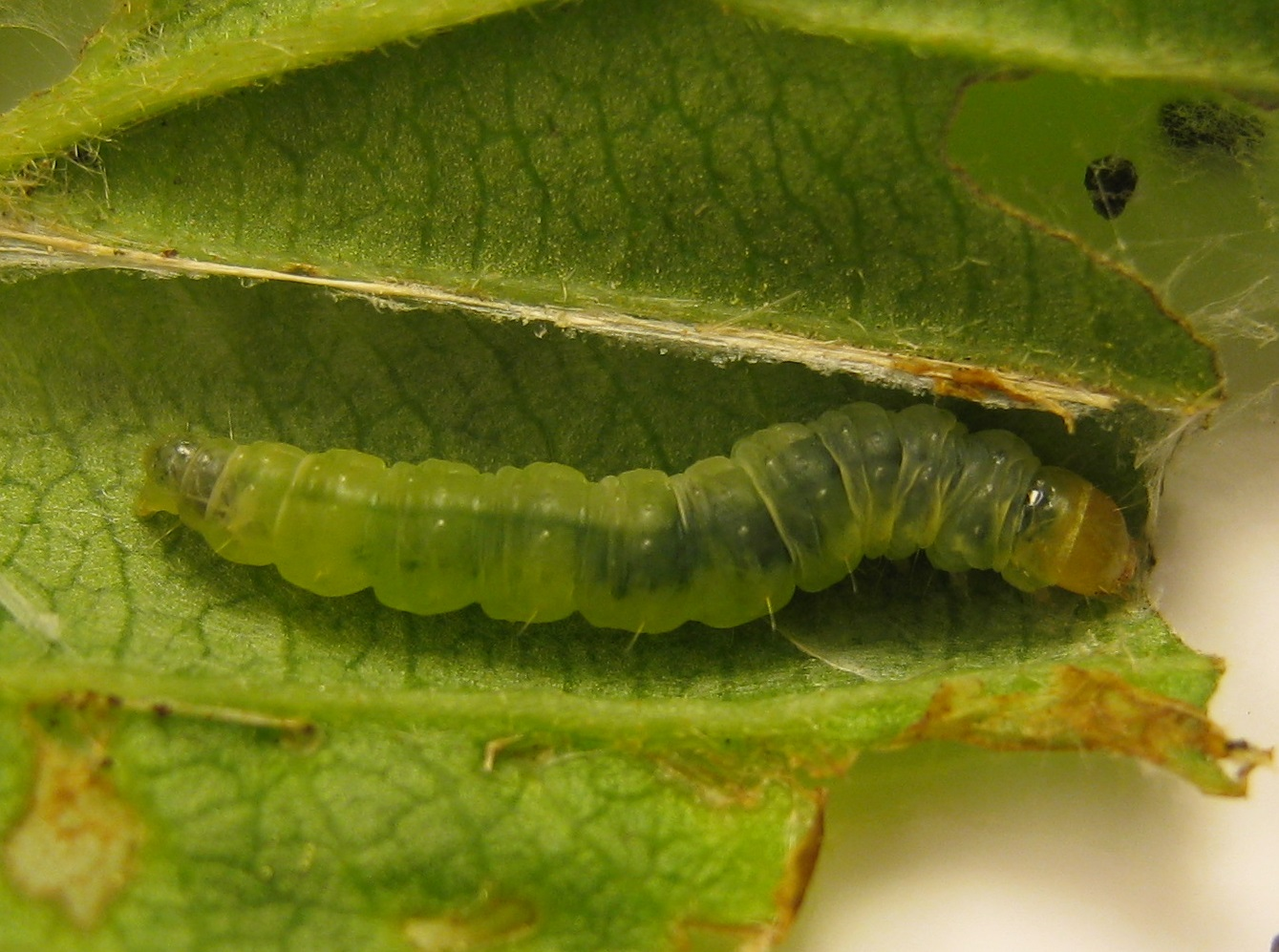
Caterpillar of Acleris schalleriana on Viburnum dentatum

The Tortricini are a tribe of tortrix moths.

== Genera ==
Accra
Acleris
Aleimma
Algoforma
Amboyna
Anaccra
Anameristes
Apotoforma
Archigraptis
Asterolepis
Beryllophantis
Brachiolia
Cnesteboda
Congoprinsia
Cordatijuxta
Cornesia
Curioseboda
Eboda
Elaeodina
Exeristeboda
Herotyda
Latibulocrinis
Merguinia
Nephograptis
Panegyra
Paraccra
Paracroesia
Paratorna
Pareboda
Plinthograptis
Polemograptis
Pseudeboda
Pseudocroesia
Reptilisocia
Rubidograptis
Rubrograptis
Russograptis
Rutilograptis
Sabahtortrix
Sanguinograptis
Sclerodisca
Shafferograptis
Spatalistis
Spinacleris
Stenotenes
Tortrix
Transita
Trophocosta
Tymbarcha
Vellonifer

== Former genera ==
Sociosa
