= Polemograptis =

Scientific classification
- Kingdom: Animalia
- Phylum: Arthropoda
- Class: Insecta
- Order: Lepidoptera
- Family: Tortricidae
- Tribe: Tortricini
- Genus: Polemograptis; Meyrick, 1910

Genus of tortrix moths

Polemograptis is a genus of moths belonging to the subfamily Tortricinae of the family Tortricidae.

== Species ==
- Polemograptis miltocosma Meyrick, 1910
- Polemograptis rubristria Razowski, 1966

== Former species ==
- Polemograptis chrysodesma Diakonoff, 1952

== See also ==
- List of Tortricidae genera
