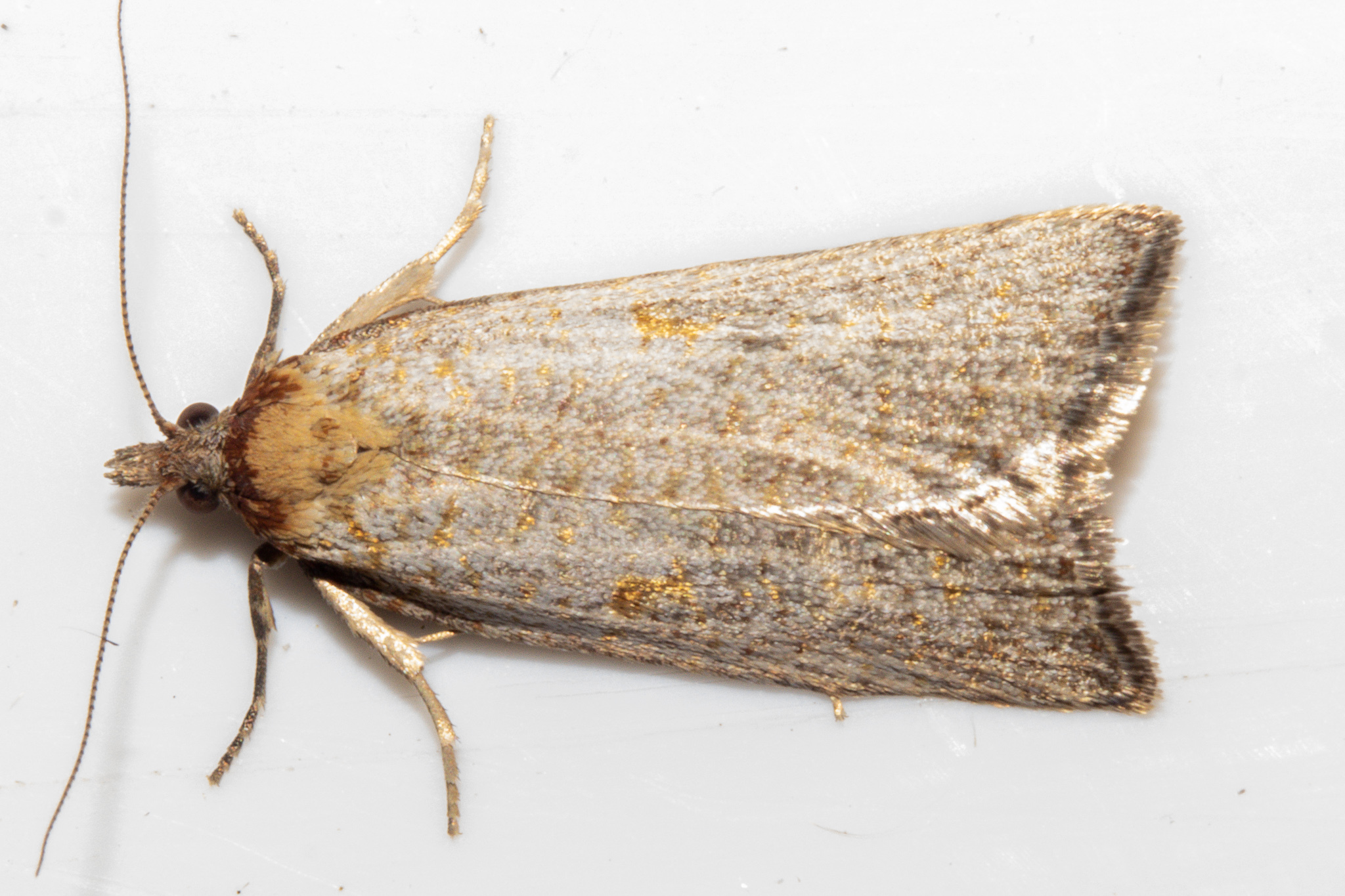

Conservation status
- Data Deficit (NZ TCS)

Scientific classification
- Kingdom: Animalia
- Phylum: Arthropoda
- Clade: Pancrustacea
- Class: Insecta
- Order: Lepidoptera
- Family: Tortricidae
- Genus: Tortrix
- Species: T. demiana

Binomial name
- Tortrix demiana Meyrick, 1882

= Tortrix demiana =

Species of moth, endemic to New Zealand

Tortrix demiana is a species of moth of the family Tortricidae. This species was first described by Edward Meyrick in 1882. It has been hypothesised that this species belongs to another genus. It is endemic to New Zealand and has been observed in the eastern parts of the southern half of the South Island. It has been observed in open ground, native scrub and "rough herbage". In 2025 this species was classified as "data deficient" under the New Zealand Threat Classification System.

== Taxonomy ==
This species was first described by Edward Meyrick in 1882. Meyrick gave a fuller describing in 1883. George Hudson discussed and illustrated this species in his 1928 book The butterflies and moths of New Zealand.

It is likely that this species belongs to another genus and as such this species is also known as Tortrix (s.l.) demiana. The male holotype, collected at South Rakaia by Dr William Henry Gaze, is held at the Natural History Museum, London.

== Description ==
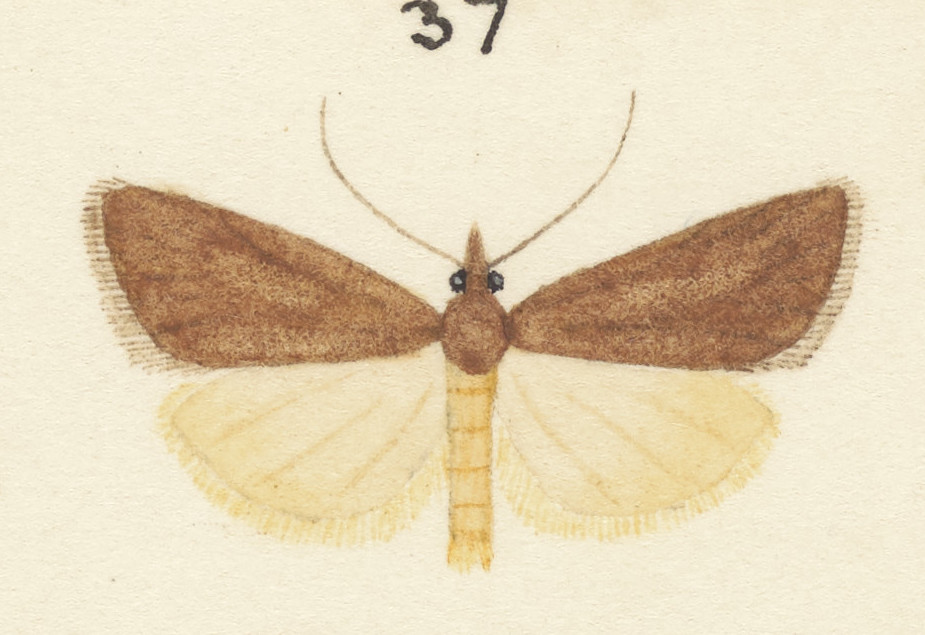
Illustration of male

Meyrick described the adults of this species as follows:

Male.—17 1/2 mm. Head, palpi, and thorax dark fuscous-grey, mixed with whitish-ochreous ; palpi rather elongate, internally whitish-ochreous. Antennae dark fuscous. Abdomen ochreous-grey, anal tuft pale greyish-ochreous. Legs ochreous-whitish, anterior and middle pair suffused with dark fuscous except at apex of joints. Forewings moderate, hardly dilated, costa moderately arched towards base, posteriorly nearly straight, hindmargin slightly sinuate, somewhat oblique; dark fuscous, densely mixed with whitish scales, and very obsoletely ochreous-tinged on small spots: cilia whitish mixed with dark fuscous. Hindwings fuscous-grey ; cilia grey- whitish, with two very suffused fuscous-grey lines.

== Distribution ==
Living moth

This species is endemic to New Zealand. T. demiana has been observed in the eastern parts of the southern half of the South Island. Hudson regarded this species as "very rare and local".

== Habitat ==
This moth inhabits open ground, native scrub and "rough herbage".

== Conservation status ==
In 2025 this species was classified by the New Zealand Department of Conservation as "data deficient" under the New Zealand Threat Classification System. This moth is data poor as a result of the difficulty in identifying the species.
