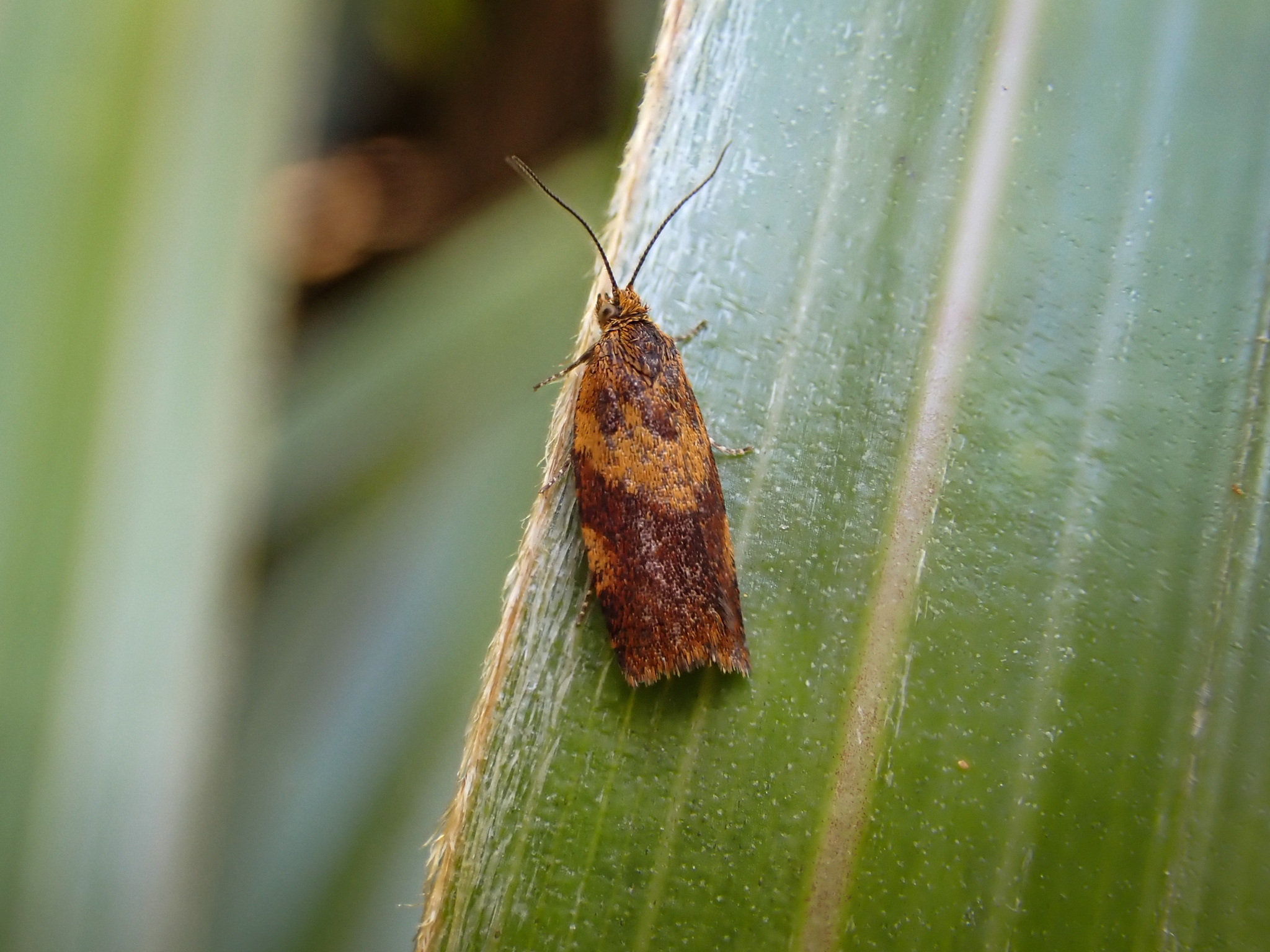

Scientific classification
- Kingdom: Animalia
- Phylum: Arthropoda
- Class: Insecta
- Order: Lepidoptera
- Family: Tortricidae
- Genus: Tortrix
- Species: T. zestodes

Binomial name
- Tortrix zestodes Meyrick, 1924

= Tortrix zestodes =

Species of moth, endemic to New Zealand

Tortrix zestodes is a species of moth of the family Tortricidae. It is endemic to New Zealand. It is likely that this species probably belongs to another genus and as such this species is also known as Tortrix (s.l.) zestodes.
