= Asterolepis =

Asterolepis may refer to:

- Asterolepis (fish), a genus of extinct armored fishes in the family Asterolepididae.
- Asterolepis (moth), a genus of moths in the family Tortricidae.
