= Asterolepis engis =

Scientific classification
- Domain: Eukaryota
- Kingdom: Animalia
- Phylum: Arthropoda
- Class: Insecta
- Order: Lepidoptera
- Family: Tortricidae
- Genus: Asterolepis
- Species: A. engis

Binomial name
- Asterolepis engis Razowski, 2012

Species of moth

Asterolepis engis is a species of moth of the family Tortricidae. It is found in Sabah.

The wingspan is about 14 mm. Adults have been recorded on wing in May.

== Etymology ==
The species name the very close relation with Asterolepis cypta and is derived from Greek engis (meaning a very close relative).
