= Curioseboda =

Scientific classification
- Kingdom: Animalia
- Phylum: Arthropoda
- Class: Insecta
- Order: Lepidoptera
- Family: Tortricidae
- Tribe: Tortricini
- Genus: Curioseboda; Razowski, 2012
- Species: C. probola

Binomial name
- Curioseboda probola Razowski, 2012

Genus of moths

Curioseboda is a genus of moths belonging to the family Tortricidae. It contains only one species, Curioseboda probola, which is found in Thailand.

The wingspan is 12.5 mm.

== Etymology ==
The genus name is derived from Latin curiosus (meaning interesting or curious) and the name of the similar genus Eboda. The species name refers to the costal scales of the forewings and is derived from Greek probolos (meaning extending forwards).

== See also ==
- List of Tortricidae genera
