= Trophocosta maculifera =

Scientific classification
- Domain: Eukaryota
- Kingdom: Animalia
- Phylum: Arthropoda
- Class: Insecta
- Order: Lepidoptera
- Family: Tortricidae
- Genus: Trophocosta
- Species: T. maculifera

Binomial name
- Trophocosta maculifera Kuznetzov, 1992

Species of moth

Trophocosta maculifera is a species of moth of the family Tortricidae. It is found in Vietnam.

Adults are similar to Trophocosta tucki, and may even be its junior synonym.
