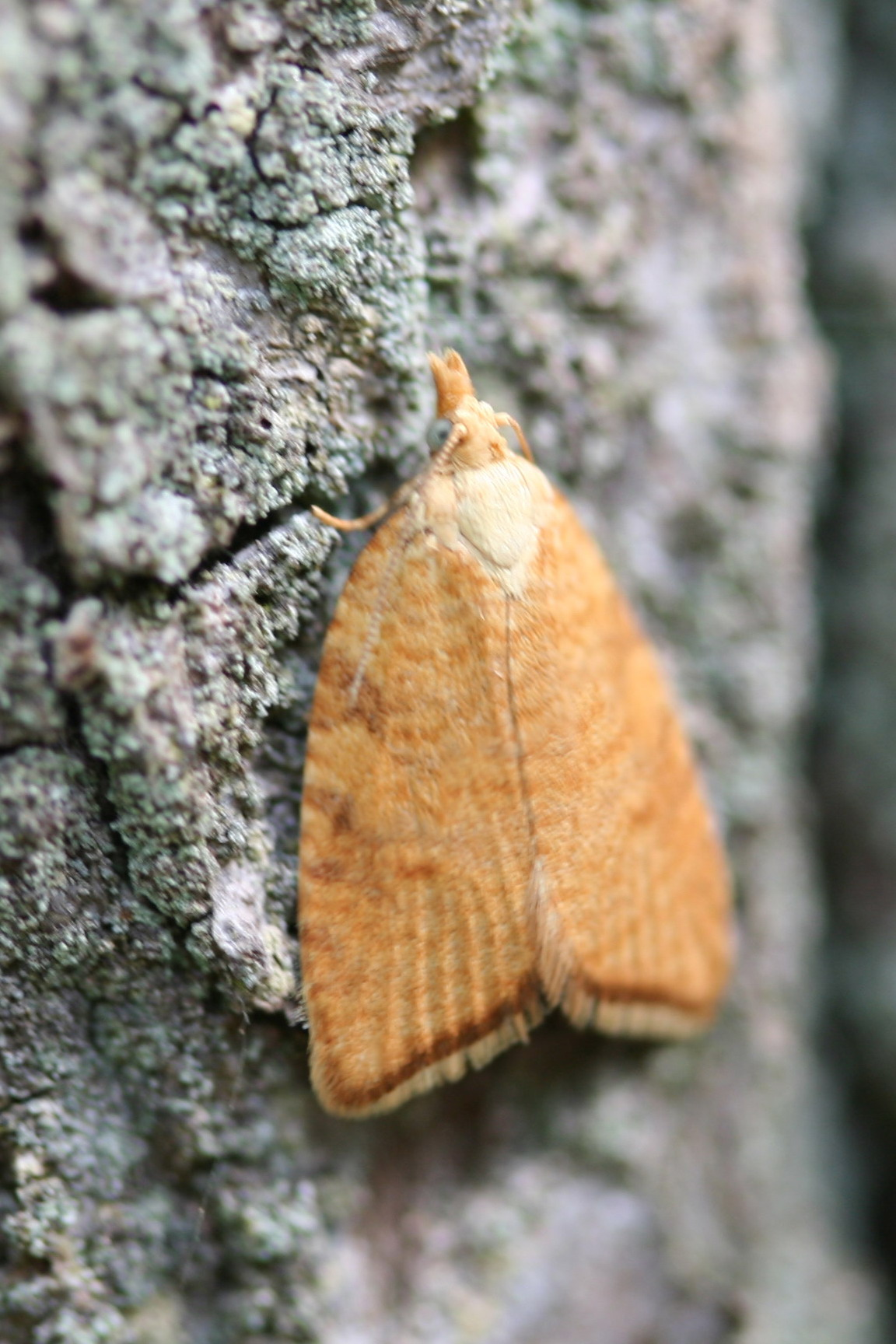

Scientific classification
- Kingdom: Animalia
- Phylum: Arthropoda
- Class: Insecta
- Order: Lepidoptera
- Family: Tortricidae
- Genus: Aleimma
- Species: A. loeflingiana

Binomial name
- Aleimma loeflingiana (Linnaeus, 1758)

Synonyms
- Phalaena (Tortrix) loeflingiana Linnaeus, 1758; Tortrix ectypana Hubner, [1799-1800]; Tortrix loefflingana Amsel, 1936; Tortrix loefflingiana Walker, 1863; Tortrix lofflingiana Petersen, 1924; Pyralis mixtana Fabricius, 1794; Tortrix plumbana Hubner, [1796-1799]; Tortrix plumbeolana Haworth, 1811

= Aleimma loeflingiana =

Species of moth

Aleimma loeflingiana is a moth of the family Tortricidae. It is found in Europe and the Near East.

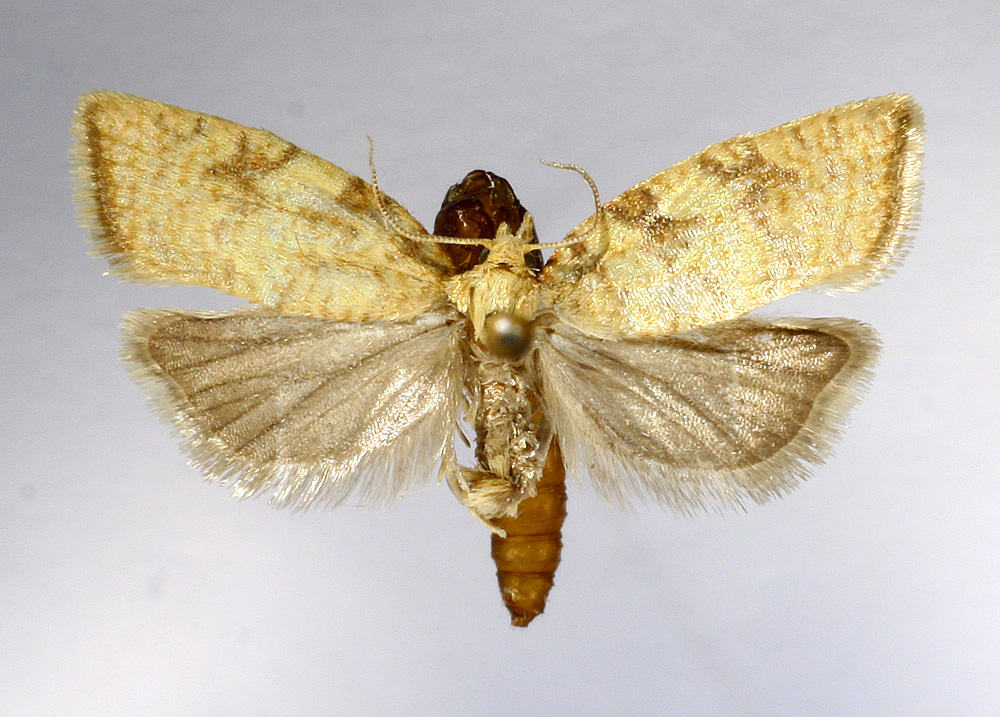

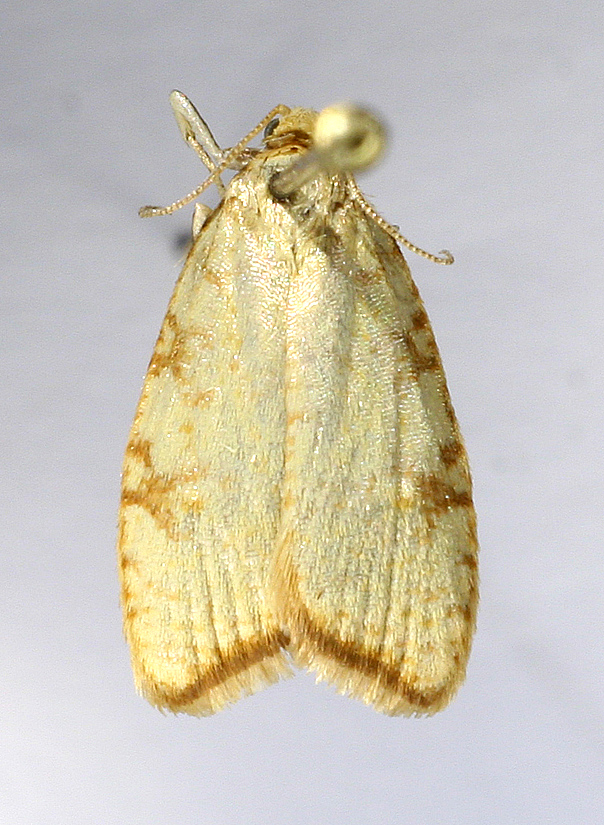

The wingspan is 14–19 mm (0.55–0.75 in).The forewings are narrowed anteriorly, whitish-ochreous or pale ochreous, more or less darker-strigulated, sometimes partially suffused with brown. The antemedian and central fasciae are outlined with fuscous or dark fuscous towards the costa and sometimes throughout, sometimes partly or wholly brown. The cilia are whitish-ochreous, the base dark fuscous. The hindwings are grey. The larva is pale green; spots, head, and plate of 2 black. Julius von Kennel provides a full description.

The moth flies from June to August from dusk.

The larvae feed on Carpinus betulus, oak and maple.
