= Archigraptis rosei =

Scientific classification
- Domain: Eukaryota
- Kingdom: Animalia
- Phylum: Arthropoda
- Class: Insecta
- Order: Lepidoptera
- Family: Tortricidae
- Genus: Archigraptis
- Species: A. rosei

Binomial name
- Archigraptis rosei Tuck, 1988

Species of moth

Archigraptis rosei is a species of moth of the family Tortricidae. It is found in Brunei.
