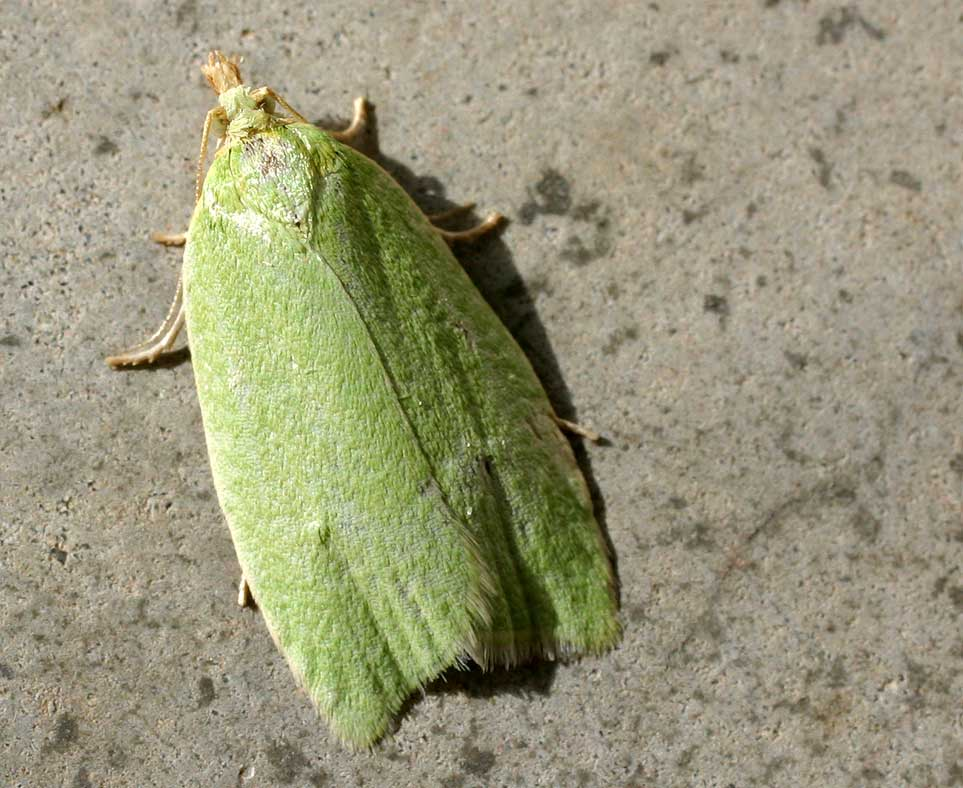

Scientific classification
- Kingdom: Animalia
- Phylum: Arthropoda
- Clade: Pancrustacea
- Class: Insecta
- Order: Lepidoptera
- Family: Tortricidae
- Genus: Tortrix
- Species: T. viridana

Binomial name
- Tortrix viridana Linnaeus, 1758

Synonyms
- Phalaena (Tortrix) viridana Linnaeus, 1758; Tortrix coeruleana Sorhagen, 1881; Tortrix viridana f. flavana Zincken, in Charpentier, 1821; Tortrix viridana f. pflegeriana Vlach, 1942; Tortrix suttneriana [Denis & Schiffermüller], 1775

= Tortrix viridana =

Species of moth

The green oak tortrix, Tortrix viridana, also known as the European oak leafroller and the green oak moth, is a distinctive green moth whose larvae feed on tree leaves, especially oak. The head, forebody and front wings are green, the hind wings lightly greyish. The wingspan is 18-24 millimetres.

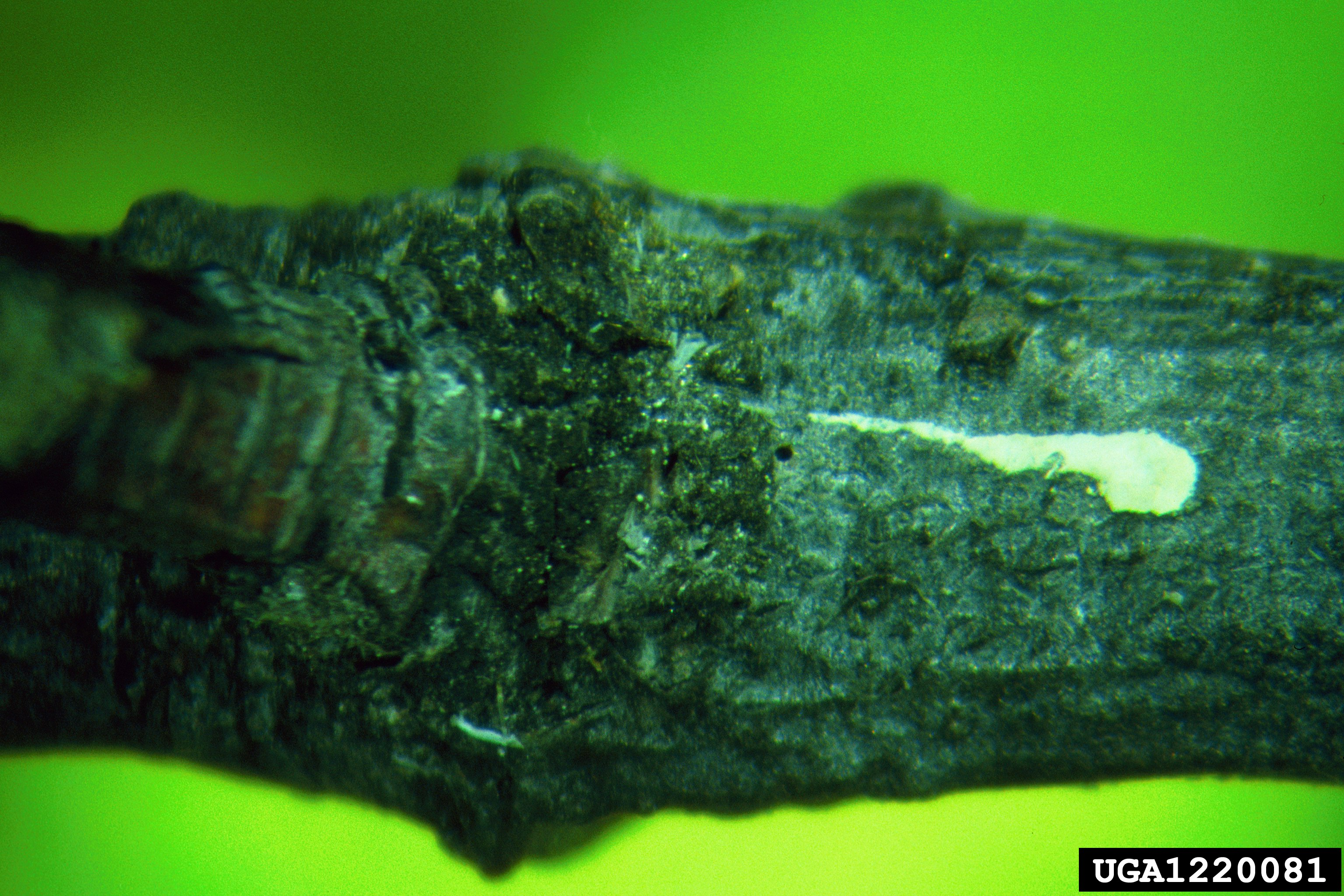
Eggs

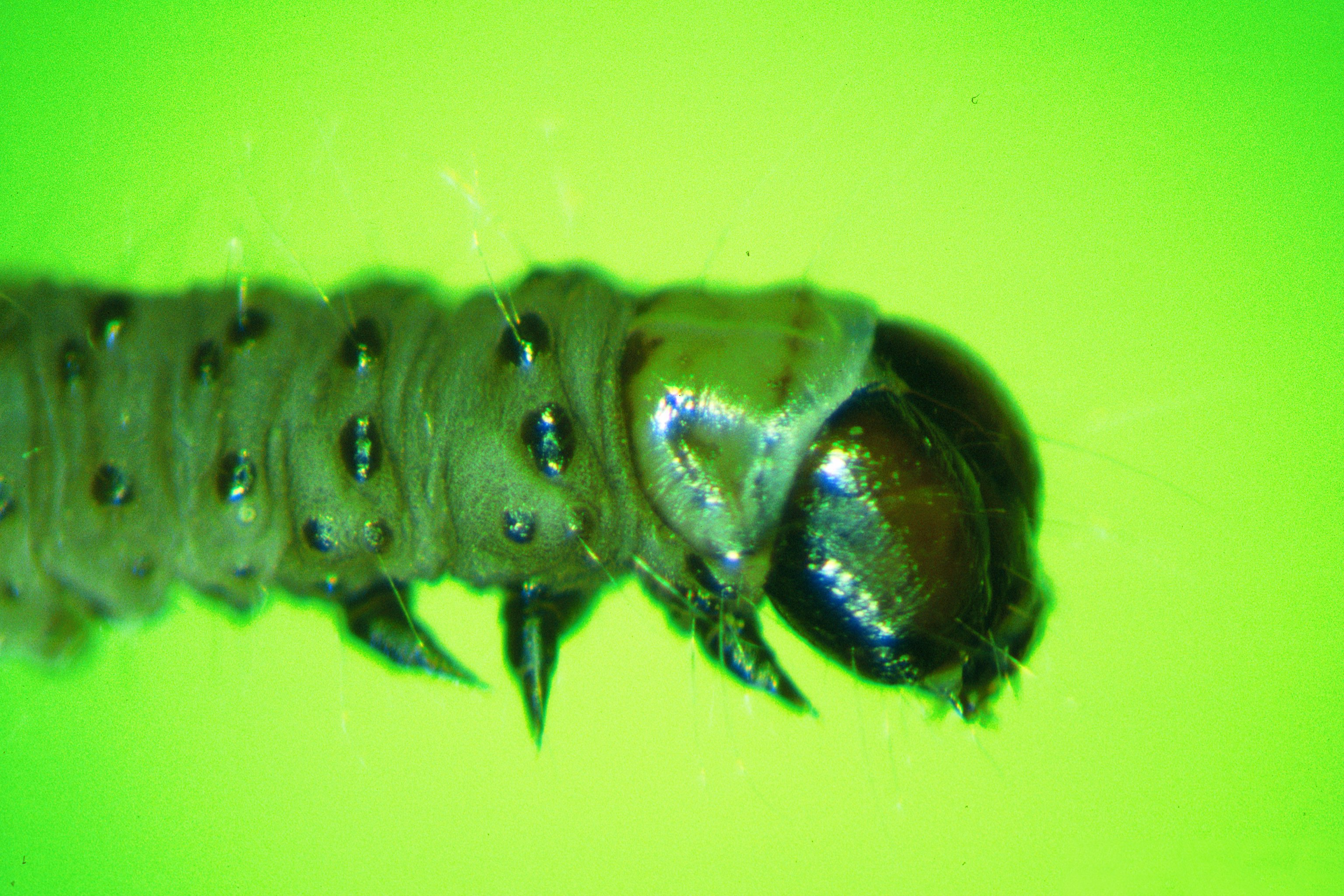
Larva

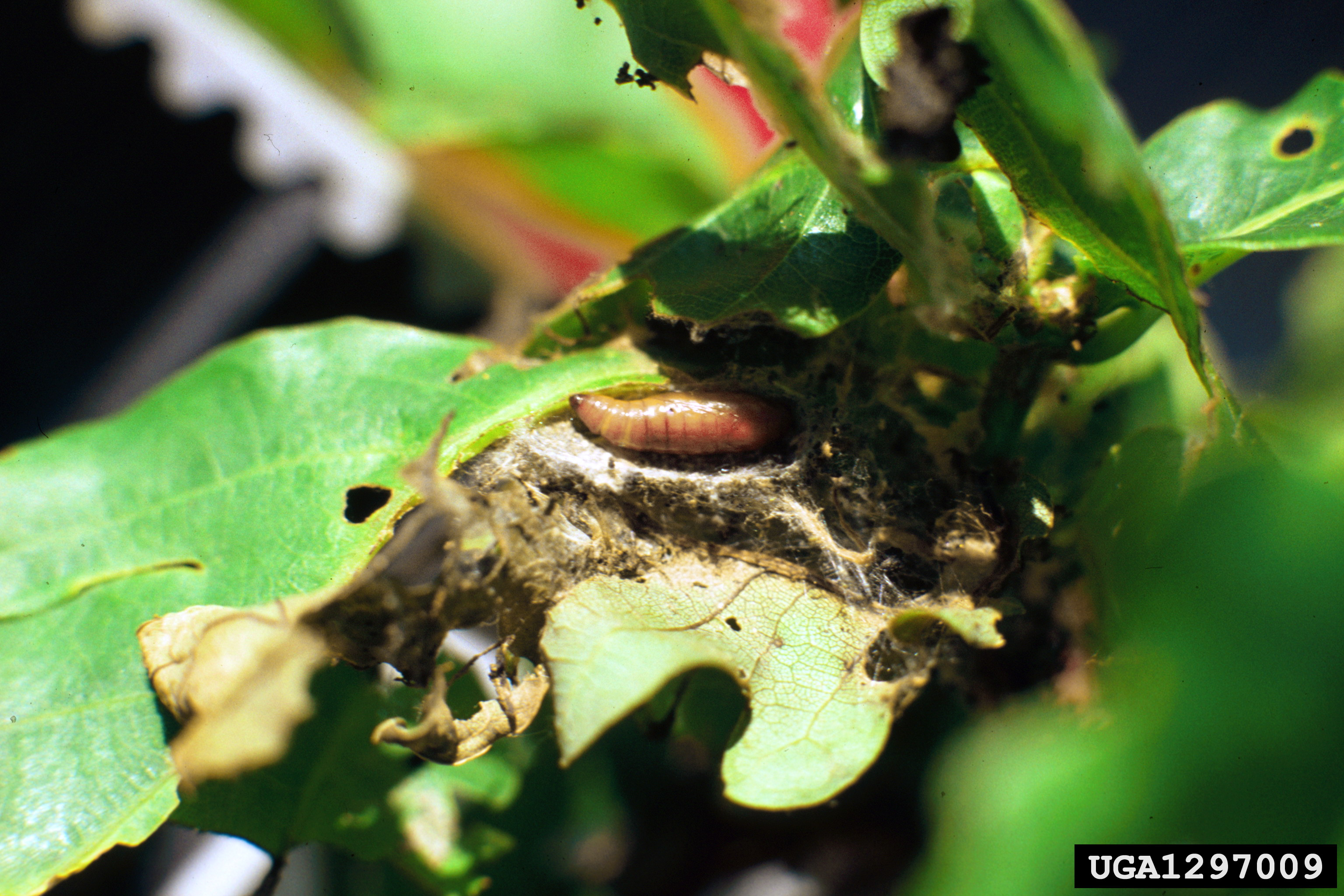
Pupa

An infestation of the larvae can defoliate an oak tree. The adult female lays its eggs next to leaf buds, which the larvae consume when they emerge. As the larvae grow bigger they eat larger leaves, and then roll themselves up in a full-sized leaf to pupate.

Larvae occur from April to June; adults are on wing in June and July.

The Ichneumon wasp Dirophanes invisor is a parasitoid which specializes on T. viridana.

They are commonly found in many parts of Britain. In the Butterfly Conservation’s Microlepidoptera Report 2011 this species was classified as common.
