= Trophocosta conchodes =

Scientific classification
- Domain: Eukaryota
- Kingdom: Animalia
- Phylum: Arthropoda
- Class: Insecta
- Order: Lepidoptera
- Family: Tortricidae
- Genus: Trophocosta
- Species: T. conchodes

Binomial name
- Trophocosta conchodes (Meyrick, 1910)

Synonyms
- Spatalistis conchodes Meyrick, 1910

Species of moth

Trophocosta conchodes is a species of moth of the family Tortricidae. It is found in New Guinea.

The wingspan is about 9 mm. The forewings are light ochreous-yellowish, with violet-silvery iridescence. The basal patch has a rather oblique edge and a moderately broad rather oblique central fascia. There is also a moderate fascia from three-fourths of the costa to the tornus and a narrow terminal fascia formed by yellow-ochreous suffusion. It is indistinct and marked with small tufts of scales, some of which are sprinkled with blackish. The hindwings are light grey.
