= Polemograptis miltocosma =

Scientific classification
- Kingdom: Animalia
- Phylum: Arthropoda
- Class: Insecta
- Order: Lepidoptera
- Family: Tortricidae
- Genus: Polemograptis
- Species: P. miltocosma

Binomial name
- Polemograptis miltocosma Meyrick, 1910

Species of moth

Polemograptis miltocosma is a species of moth of the family Tortricidae. It is found on Borneo, Pulo Laut, Peninsular Malaysia, and in Indonesia and the Philippines (Luzon).
