= Stenotenes =

Scientific classification
- Kingdom: Animalia
- Phylum: Arthropoda
- Class: Insecta
- Order: Lepidoptera
- Family: Tortricidae
- Tribe: Tortricini
- Genus: Stenotenes; Diakonoff, 1954

Genus of moths

Stenotenes is a genus of moths belonging to the subfamily Tortricinae of the family Tortricidae.

== Species ==
- Stenotenes acroptycha Diakonoff, 1954
- Stenotenes aspasia Diakonoff, 1972
- Stenotenes incudis Diakonoff, 1954

== Taxonomy ==
The genus is sometimes assigned to the Schoenotenini.

== See also ==
- List of Tortricidae genera
