= Asterolepis dipterocarpi =

Scientific classification
- Kingdom: Animalia
- Phylum: Arthropoda
- Class: Insecta
- Order: Lepidoptera
- Family: Tortricidae
- Genus: Asterolepis
- Species: A. dipterocarpi

Binomial name
- Asterolepis dipterocarpi Razowski, 2012

Species of moth

Asterolepis dipterocarpi is a species of moth of the family Tortricidae. It is found in Brunei. The habitat consists of dipterocarp forests.

The wingspan is about 12 mm.

== Etymology ==
The species name refers to the type of forest at the type locality.
