= Sabahtortrix =

Scientific classification
- Kingdom: Animalia
- Phylum: Arthropoda
- Class: Insecta
- Order: Lepidoptera
- Family: Tortricidae
- Tribe: Tortricini
- Genus: Sabahtortrix; Razowski, 2012
- Species: S. montana

Binomial name
- Sabahtortrix montana Razowski, 2012

Genus of moths

Sabahtortrix is a genus of moths belonging to the family Tortricidae. It contains only one species, Sabahtortrix montana, which is found on Sabah in Malaysia. The habitat consists of primary montane forests.

The wingspan is 16–18 mm.

== See also ==
- List of Tortricidae genera
