= Trophocosta aurea =

Scientific classification
- Domain: Eukaryota
- Kingdom: Animalia
- Phylum: Arthropoda
- Class: Insecta
- Order: Lepidoptera
- Family: Tortricidae
- Genus: Trophocosta
- Species: T. aurea

Binomial name
- Trophocosta aurea Razowski, 1966

Species of moth

Trophocosta aurea is a species of moth of the family Tortricidae. It is found on Borneo.
