= Herotyda =

Scientific classification
- Kingdom: Animalia
- Phylum: Arthropoda
- Class: Insecta
- Order: Lepidoptera
- Family: Tortricidae
- Tribe: Tortricini
- Genus: Herotyda; Razowski, 1971
- Species: H. minuta

Binomial name
- Herotyda minuta (Razowski, 1966)

Synonyms
- Dohertya Razowski, 1966 (preocc. Hampson, 1894); Dohertya minuta Razowski, 1966

Monotypic genus of tortrix moths

Herotyda is a genus of moths belonging to the subfamily Tortricinae of the family Tortricidae. It contains only one species, Herotyda minuta, which is found on Borneo (Pulo Laut).

== See also ==
- List of Tortricidae genera
