= Eboda discobola =

Scientific classification
- Domain: Eukaryota
- Kingdom: Animalia
- Phylum: Arthropoda
- Class: Insecta
- Order: Lepidoptera
- Family: Tortricidae
- Genus: Eboda
- Species: E. discobola

Binomial name
- Eboda discobola Diakonoff, 1948

Species of moth

Eboda discobola is a species of moth of the family Tortricidae. It is found in Indonesia (Java).
