= Eboda dissimilis =

Scientific classification
- Domain: Eukaryota
- Kingdom: Animalia
- Phylum: Arthropoda
- Class: Insecta
- Order: Lepidoptera
- Family: Tortricidae
- Genus: Eboda
- Species: E. dissimilis

Binomial name
- Eboda dissimilis Liu & Bai, 1986

Species of moth

Eboda dissimilis is a species of moth of the family Tortricidae. It is found in China (Yunnan).
