= Anaccra camerunica =

Scientific classification
- Kingdom: Animalia
- Phylum: Arthropoda
- Class: Insecta
- Order: Lepidoptera
- Family: Tortricidae
- Genus: Anaccra
- Species: A. camerunica

Binomial name
- Anaccra camerunica (Razowski, 1966)

Synonyms
- Accra camerunica Razowski, 1966

Species of moth

Anaccra camerunica is a species of moth of the family Tortricidae. It is found in Cameroon.
