= Asterolepis chlorissa =

Scientific classification
- Domain: Eukaryota
- Kingdom: Animalia
- Phylum: Arthropoda
- Class: Insecta
- Order: Lepidoptera
- Family: Tortricidae
- Genus: Asterolepis
- Species: A. chlorissa

Binomial name
- Asterolepis chlorissa (Razowski, 1966)

Synonyms
- Tymbarcha chlorissa Razowski, 1966

Species of moth

Asterolepis chlorissa is a species of moth of the family Tortricidae. It is found in Indonesia (Moluccas).
