= Paracroesia abievora =

Scientific classification
- Kingdom: Animalia
- Phylum: Arthropoda
- Class: Insecta
- Order: Lepidoptera
- Family: Tortricidae
- Genus: Paracroesia
- Species: P. abievora

Binomial name
- Paracroesia abievora (Issiki, 1961)

Synonyms
- Epagoge abievora Issiki, in Issiki & Mutuura, 1961; Danilevskiana pusilla Kuznetzov, 1973

Species of moth

Paracroesia abievora is a moth of the family Tortricidae. It is found in Japan and the Russian Far East.

The larva is generally 9 millimetres (0.35 in) long. The species has only one generation yearly, the moths flying only from late April through late May.

The larvae feed on Abies firma.
