= Sclerodisca hemiprasina =

Scientific classification
- Domain: Eukaryota
- Kingdom: Animalia
- Phylum: Arthropoda
- Class: Insecta
- Order: Lepidoptera
- Family: Tortricidae
- Genus: Sclerodisca
- Species: S. hemiprasina

Binomial name
- Sclerodisca hemiprasina (Diakonoff, 1952)

Synonyms
- Tymbarcha hemiprasina Diakonoff, 1952

Species of moth

Sclerodisca hemiprasina is a species of moth of the family Tortricidae. It is found in New Guinea.
