= Tymbarcha =

Scientific classification
- Kingdom: Animalia
- Phylum: Arthropoda
- Class: Insecta
- Order: Lepidoptera
- Family: Tortricidae
- Tribe: Tortricini
- Genus: Tymbarcha; Meyrick, 1908

Genus of tortrix moths

Tymbarcha is a genus of moths belonging to the subfamily Tortricinae of the family Tortricidae. It consists of two species.

== Species ==
- Tymbarcha cerinopa Meyrick, 1908
- Tymbarcha translucida Diakonoff, 1941

== See also ==
- List of Tortricidae genera
