= Eboda bryochlora =

Scientific classification
- Domain: Eukaryota
- Kingdom: Animalia
- Phylum: Arthropoda
- Class: Insecta
- Order: Lepidoptera
- Family: Tortricidae
- Genus: Eboda
- Species: E. bryochlora

Binomial name
- Eboda bryochlora Diakonoff, 1960

Species of moth

Eboda bryochlora is a species of moth of the family Tortricidae. It is found in Madagascar.
