= Pareboda =

Scientific classification
- Kingdom: Animalia
- Phylum: Arthropoda
- Class: Insecta
- Order: Lepidoptera
- Family: Tortricidae
- Tribe: Tortricini
- Genus: Pareboda; Razowski, 1966
- Species: P. prosecta

Binomial name
- Pareboda prosecta Razowski, 1966

Monotypic genus of tortrix moths

Pareboda is a genus of moths belonging to the subfamily Tortricinae of the family Tortricidae. It contains only one species, Pareboda prosecta, which is found in New Guinea.

== See also ==
- List of Tortricidae genera
