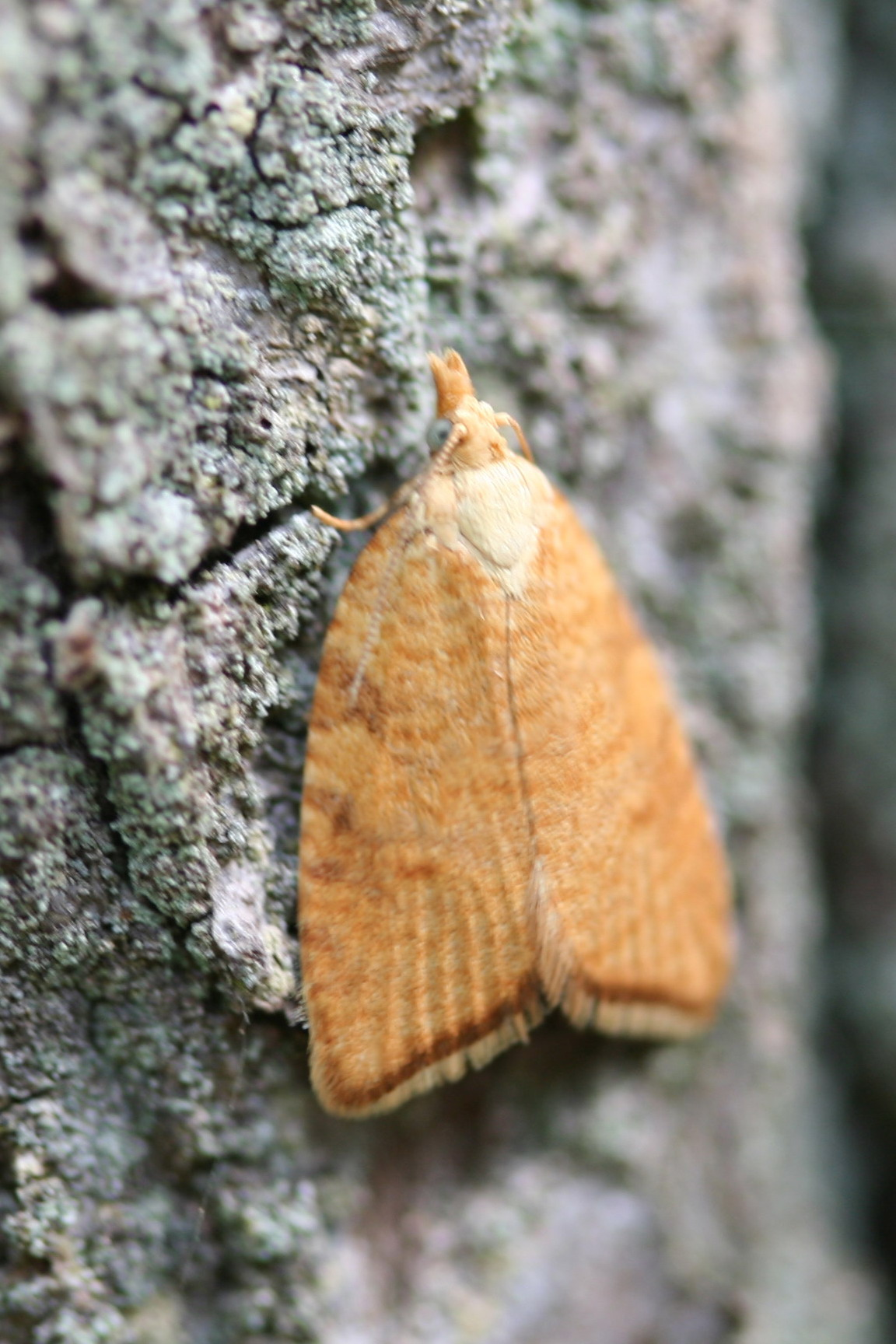
- Aleimma loeflingiana

Scientific classification
- Domain: Eukaryota
- Kingdom: Animalia
- Phylum: Arthropoda
- Class: Insecta
- Order: Lepidoptera
- Family: Tortricidae
- Tribe: Tortricini
- Genus: Aleimma; Hubner, [1825]

Synonyms
- Alimma Agassiz, 1848; Dictyopteryx Stephens, 1829

= Aleimma =

Genus of tortrix moths

Aleimma is a genus of moths belonging to the subfamily Tortricinae of the family Tortricidae.

== Species ==
- Aleimma loeflingiana (Linnaeus, 1758)

== See also ==
- List of Tortricidae genera
