= Reptilisocia tarica =

Scientific classification
- Domain: Eukaryota
- Kingdom: Animalia
- Phylum: Arthropoda
- Class: Insecta
- Order: Lepidoptera
- Family: Tortricidae
- Genus: Reptilisocia
- Species: R. tarica

Binomial name
- Reptilisocia tarica Razowski, 2012

Species of moth

Reptilisocia tarica is a species of moth of the family Tortricidae. It is found in Papua New Guinea.

The wingspan is about 13 mm.
