= Reptilisocia =

Scientific classification
- Domain: Eukaryota
- Kingdom: Animalia
- Phylum: Arthropoda
- Class: Insecta
- Order: Lepidoptera
- Family: Tortricidae
- Tribe: Tortricini
- Genus: Reptilisocia; Diakonoff, 1983

Genus of tortrix moths

Reptilisocia is a genus of moths belonging to the family Tortricidae.

== Species ==
- Reptilisocia gunungana Razowski, 2013
- Reptilisocia impetigo Razowski, 2012
- Reptilisocia paraxena Diakonoff, 1983
- Reptilisocia paryphaea (Meyrick, 1907)
- Reptilisocia solomonensis Razowski, 2012
- Reptilisocia tarica Razowski, 2012

== See also ==
- List of Tortricidae genera
