= Polemograptis rubristria =

Scientific classification
- Domain: Eukaryota
- Kingdom: Animalia
- Phylum: Arthropoda
- Class: Insecta
- Order: Lepidoptera
- Family: Tortricidae
- Genus: Polemograptis
- Species: P. rubristria

Binomial name
- Polemograptis rubristria Razowski, 1966

Species of moth

Polemograptis rubristria is a species of moth of the family Tortricidae and arthropoda phylum. It is found on Peninsular Malaysia and Borneo.
