= Trophocosta =

Scientific classification
- Kingdom: Animalia
- Phylum: Arthropoda
- Class: Insecta
- Order: Lepidoptera
- Family: Tortricidae
- Tribe: Tortricini
- Genus: Trophocosta; Razowski, 1964

Synonyms
- Tropocosta Diakonoff, 1976

Genus of tortrix moths

Trophocosta is a genus of moths belonging to the subfamily Tortricinae of the family Tortricidae.

== Species ==
- Trophocosta argyrosperma (Diakonoff, 1953)
- Trophocosta aurea Razowski, 1966
- Trophocosta conchodes (Meyrick, 1910)
- Trophocosta cyanoxantha (Meyrick, 1907)
- Trophocosta hilarochroma (Diakonoff, 1951)
- Trophocosta maculifera Kuznetzov, 1992
- Trophocosta nitens Razowski, 1964
- Trophocosta nummifera (Meyrick, 1910)
- Trophocosta tucki Razowski, 1986

== See also ==
- List of Tortricidae genera
