= Trophocosta hilarochroma =

Scientific classification
- Domain: Eukaryota
- Kingdom: Animalia
- Phylum: Arthropoda
- Class: Insecta
- Order: Lepidoptera
- Family: Tortricidae
- Genus: Trophocosta
- Species: T. hilarochroma

Binomial name
- Trophocosta hilarochroma (Diakonoff, 1951)

Synonyms
- Spatalistis hilarochroma Diakonoff, 1951; Spatalistis hylarochroma Diakonoff, 1951

Species of moth

Trophocosta hilarochroma is a species of moth of the family Tortricidae. It is found on Java.
