= Sclerodisca =

Scientific classification
- Kingdom: Animalia
- Phylum: Arthropoda
- Class: Insecta
- Order: Lepidoptera
- Family: Tortricidae
- Tribe: Tortricini
- Genus: Sclerodisca; Razowski, 1964

Genus of tortrix moths

Sclerodisca is a genus of moths belonging to the subfamily Tortricinae of the family Tortricidae.

== Species ==
- Sclerodisca hemiprasina (Diakonoff, 1952)
- Sclerodisca papuana Razowski, 1964

== See also ==
- List of Tortricidae genera
