= Reptilisocia paraxena =

Scientific classification
- Domain: Eukaryota
- Kingdom: Animalia
- Phylum: Arthropoda
- Class: Insecta
- Order: Lepidoptera
- Family: Tortricidae
- Genus: Reptilisocia
- Species: R. paraxena

Binomial name
- Reptilisocia paraxena Diakonoff, 1983

Species of moth

Reptilisocia paraxena is a species of moth of the family Tortricidae. It is found in Indonesia (Sumatra).
