= Eboda virescens =

Scientific classification
- Kingdom: Animalia
- Phylum: Arthropoda
- Class: Insecta
- Order: Lepidoptera
- Family: Tortricidae
- Genus: Eboda
- Species: E. virescens

Binomial name
- Eboda virescens Razowski, 1964

Species of moth

Eboda virescens is a species of moth of the family Tortricidae. It is found in India (Assam), Sri Lanka and Indonesia (Borneo, Java).
