= Trophocosta cyanoxantha =

Scientific classification
- Domain: Eukaryota
- Kingdom: Animalia
- Phylum: Arthropoda
- Class: Insecta
- Order: Lepidoptera
- Family: Tortricidae
- Genus: Trophocosta
- Species: T. cyanoxantha

Binomial name
- Trophocosta cyanoxantha (Meyrick, 1907)

Synonyms
- Spatalistis cyanoxantha Meyrick, 1907

Species of moth

Trophocosta cyanoxantha is a species of moth of the family Tortricidae. It was described by Edward Meyrick in 1907. It is endemic to Sri Lanka.

The wingspan is 8–10 millimetres (0.31–0.39 in). The forewings are orange, strigulated with darker and suffused with fuscous except towards the costa and termen. There are two spots at the base and four angulated transverse series of about four rounded leaden-blue-metallic spots each, alternating with some small blackish tufts. There are also some pale golden metallic dots on the posterior half of the costa and termen. The hindwings are rather dark grey.
