= Transita =

Scientific classification
- Kingdom: Animalia
- Phylum: Arthropoda
- Clade: Pancrustacea
- Class: Insecta
- Order: Lepidoptera
- Family: Tortricidae
- Tribe: Tortricini
- Genus: Transita; Diakonoff, 1976
- Species: T. exaesia

Binomial name
- Transita exaesia Diakonoff, 1976

Monotypic genus of tortrix moths

Transita is a genus of moths belonging to the subfamily Tortricinae of the family Tortricidae. It contains only one species, Transita exaesia, which is found in Nepal.

== See also ==
- List of Tortricidae genera
