= Cornesia ormoperla =

Scientific classification
- Kingdom: Animalia
- Phylum: Arthropoda
- Class: Insecta
- Order: Lepidoptera
- Family: Tortricidae
- Genus: Cornesia
- Species: C. ormoperla

Binomial name
- Cornesia ormoperla Razowski, 1981

Species of moth

Cornesia ormoperla is a species of moth of the family Tortricidae. It is found in Zambia, Zimbabwe, Nigeria, South Africa and the Democratic Republic of the Congo.

The length of the forewings is 7–8 mm.
