= Spinacleris =

Scientific classification
- Kingdom: Animalia
- Phylum: Arthropoda
- Class: Insecta
- Order: Lepidoptera
- Family: Tortricidae
- Tribe: Tortricini
- Genus: Spinacleris; Razowski, 2012
- Species: S. inthanoni

Binomial name
- Spinacleris inthanoni Razowski, 2012

Genus of moths

Spinacleris is a genus of moths belonging to the family Tortricidae. It contains only one species, Spinacleris inthanoni, which is found in Thailand.

The wingspan is 18 millimetres (0.71 in).

== Etymology ==
The genus name is a combination of the name of the genus Acleris and Latin spina (meaning a spine). The species name refers to the type locality.

== See also ==
- List of Tortricidae genera
