= Pseudeboda africana =

Scientific classification
- Domain: Eukaryota
- Kingdom: Animalia
- Phylum: Arthropoda
- Class: Insecta
- Order: Lepidoptera
- Family: Tortricidae
- Genus: Pseudeboda
- Species: P. africana

Binomial name
- Pseudeboda africana Razowski, 1964

Species of moth

Pseudeboda africana is a species of moth of the family Tortricidae. It is found in South Africa.
