= Cornesia arabuco =

Scientific classification
- Domain: Eukaryota
- Kingdom: Animalia
- Phylum: Arthropoda
- Class: Insecta
- Order: Lepidoptera
- Family: Tortricidae
- Genus: Cornesia
- Species: C. arabuco

Binomial name
- Cornesia arabuco Razowski, 2012

Species of moth

Cornesia arabuco is a species of moth of the family Tortricidae. It was described by Józef Razowski in 2012 and is endemic to Kenya.

The wingspan is about 15 millimetres (0.59 in).

== Etymology ==
The species name refers to the type locality.
