= Eboda diakonoffi =

Scientific classification
- Kingdom: Animalia
- Phylum: Arthropoda
- Class: Insecta
- Order: Lepidoptera
- Family: Tortricidae
- Genus: Eboda
- Species: E. diakonoffi

Binomial name
- Eboda diakonoffi Razowski, 1964

Species of moth

Eboda diakonoffi is a species of moth of the family Tortricidae.

It is native to Indonesia and Papua New Guinea,

It has been recorded from Fergusson Island of the D'Entrecasteaux Islands archipelago, and the Admiralty Islands, of Papua New Guinea; and from Sulawesi of Indonesia .
