= Tymbarcha translucida =

Scientific classification
- Domain: Eukaryota
- Kingdom: Animalia
- Phylum: Arthropoda
- Class: Insecta
- Order: Lepidoptera
- Family: Tortricidae
- Genus: Tymbarcha
- Species: T. translucida

Binomial name
- Tymbarcha translucida Diakonoff, 1941

Species of moth

Tymbarcha translucida is a species of moth of the genus Tymbarcha and the family Tortricidae. It is found in Western Indonesia (Java).
