= Eboda smaragdinana =

Scientific classification
- Kingdom: Animalia
- Phylum: Arthropoda
- Class: Insecta
- Order: Lepidoptera
- Family: Tortricidae
- Genus: Eboda
- Species: E. smaragdinana

Binomial name
- Eboda smaragdinana Walker, 1866

Synonyms
- Eboda smaragdina Razowski, 1963

Species of moth

Eboda smaragdinana is a species of moth of the family Tortricidae. It is found in Sri Lanka, New Guinea, the Admiralty Islands and the Solomon Islands.

It has a wingspan of 14–18 mm, head and thorax are green, palpi white spotted with olive green, forewings deep emerald green.
