= Trophocosta argyrosperma =

Scientific classification
- Domain: Eukaryota
- Kingdom: Animalia
- Phylum: Arthropoda
- Class: Insecta
- Order: Lepidoptera
- Family: Tortricidae
- Genus: Trophocosta
- Species: T. argyrosperma

Binomial name
- Trophocosta argyrosperma (Diakonoff, 1953)

Synonyms
- Spatalistis argyrosperma Diakonoff, 1953

Species of moth

Trophocosta argyrosperma is a species of moth of the family Tortricidae. It is found in New Guinea.
