= Tortrix sinapina =

Scientific classification
- Domain: Eukaryota
- Kingdom: Animalia
- Phylum: Arthropoda
- Class: Insecta
- Order: Lepidoptera
- Family: Tortricidae
- Genus: Tortrix
- Species: T. sinapina

Binomial name
- Tortrix sinapina (Butler, 1879)

Synonyms
- Pandemis sinapina Butler, 1879; Tortrix kawabei Razowski, 1966

Species of moth

Tortrix sinapina, the Japanese oak leafroller, is a species of moth of the family Tortricidae. It is found in the Russian Far East (Ussuri), China (Zhejiang) and Japan (Honshu, Hokkaido).

The wingspan is 18–25 mm.

The larvae feed on Quercus mongolica, Quercus dentata, Lespedeza bicolor, Tilia japonica and Sorbus alnifolia.
