= Sclerodisca papuana =

Scientific classification
- Kingdom: Animalia
- Phylum: Arthropoda
- Class: Insecta
- Order: Lepidoptera
- Family: Tortricidae
- Genus: Sclerodisca
- Species: S. papuana

Binomial name
- Sclerodisca papuana Razowski, 1964

Species of moth

Sclerodisca papuana is a species of moth from the family Tortricidae. It is mostly found in Papua New Guinea, where it has been recorded from the D'Entrecasteaux Islands, specifically (Goodenough Island).
