= Pseudeboda =

Scientific classification
- Domain: Eukaryota
- Kingdom: Animalia
- Phylum: Arthropoda
- Class: Insecta
- Order: Lepidoptera
- Family: Tortricidae
- Tribe: Tortricini
- Genus: Pseudeboda; Razowski, 1964

Genus of tortrix moths

Pseudeboda is a genus of moths belonging to the subfamily Tortricinae of the family Tortricidae.

== Species ==
- Pseudeboda africana Razowski, 1964
- Pseudeboda gambiae Razowski, 1964

== See also ==
- List of Tortricidae genera
