= Stenotenes aspasia =

Scientific classification
- Domain: Eukaryota
- Kingdom: Animalia
- Phylum: Arthropoda
- Class: Insecta
- Order: Lepidoptera
- Family: Tortricidae
- Genus: Stenotenes
- Species: S. aspasia

Binomial name
- Stenotenes aspasia Diakonoff, 1972

Species of moth

Stenotenes aspasia is a species of moth of the family Tortricidae. It is found in New Guinea.
