= Elaeodina =

Scientific classification
- Kingdom: Animalia
- Phylum: Arthropoda
- Class: Insecta
- Order: Lepidoptera
- Family: Tortricidae
- Tribe: Tortricini
- Genus: Elaeodina; Meyrick, 1926
- Species: E. refrangens

Binomial name
- Elaeodina refrangens Meyrick, 1926

Genus of tortrix moths

Elaeodina is a genus of moths belonging to the subfamily Tortricinae of the family Tortricidae. It contains only one species, Elaeodina refrangens, which is found on Borneo.

== See also ==
- List of Tortricidae genera
