= Merguinia =

Scientific classification
- Kingdom: Animalia
- Phylum: Arthropoda
- Class: Insecta
- Order: Lepidoptera
- Family: Tortricidae
- Tribe: Tortricini
- Genus: Merguinia; Razowski, 2012
- Species: M. merguinia

Binomial name
- Merguinia merguinia Razowski, 2012

Genus of moths

Merguinia is a genus of moths belonging to the family Tortricidae. It contains only one species, Merguinia merguinia, which is found in Myanmar.

The wingspan is 9.5 mm.

== Etymology ==
The genus name refers the type locality of the type species and the species name refers to Mergui (now Myeik) in Tenasserim, the type locality.

== See also ==
- List of Tortricidae genera
