= Archigraptis stauroma =

Scientific classification
- Kingdom: Animalia
- Phylum: Arthropoda
- Class: Insecta
- Order: Lepidoptera
- Family: Tortricidae
- Genus: Archigraptis
- Species: A. stauroma

Binomial name
- Archigraptis stauroma (Diakonoff, 1968)

Synonyms
- Polemograptis stauroma Diakonoff, 1968

Species of moth

Archigraptis stauroma is a species of moth of the family Tortricidae. It is found in the Philippines (Negros).

The length of the forewings is about 14 mm. The forewings are light bluish green, partially suffused with light emerald green. There is a pale ochreous-pinkish streak along the costa with five ferruginous-black dots along its anterior fourth, and with two triangular larger dots alternating with several small ferruginous points and transverse streaks towards the apex. The hindwings are rather thinly scaled, dark grey, turning black towards the apex.
