= Amboyna (moth) =

Scientific classification
- Domain: Eukaryota
- Kingdom: Animalia
- Phylum: Arthropoda
- Class: Insecta
- Order: Lepidoptera
- Family: Tortricidae
- Tribe: Tortricini
- Genus: Amboyna; Razowski, 1964

Genus of tortrix moths

Amboyna is a genus of moths belonging to the subfamily Tortricinae of the family Tortricidae.

== Species ==
- Amboyna diapella Common, 1965
- Amboyna furcifera Razowski, 1964

== See also ==
- List of Tortricidae genera
