= Shafferograptis =

Scientific classification
- Kingdom: Animalia
- Phylum: Arthropoda
- Class: Insecta
- Order: Lepidoptera
- Family: Tortricidae
- Tribe: Tortricini
- Genus: Shafferograptis; Tuck & Razowski, 2012
- Species: S. michaeli

Binomial name
- Shafferograptis michaeli Tuck & Razowski, 2012

Genus of moths

Shafferograptis is a genus of moths within the Tortricidae family. It contains only one species, Shafferograptis michaeli, which is found in western Malaysia and Brunei. The habitat consists of lowland dipterocarp forests.

The wingspan is about 11 mm.

== Etymology ==
The genus name and species name honour Michael Shaffer, former curator at the Natural History Museum, London.

== See also ==
- List of Tortricidae genera
