= Paracroesia picevora =

Scientific classification
- Kingdom: Animalia
- Phylum: Arthropoda
- Clade: Pancrustacea
- Class: Insecta
- Order: Lepidoptera
- Family: Tortricidae
- Genus: Paracroesia
- Species: P. picevora

Binomial name
- Paracroesia picevora Y.-Q. Liu, 1990

Species of moth

Paracroesia picevora is a moth of the family Tortricidae. It was described by You-Qiao Liu in 1990. It is found in Gansu, China.

The length of the forewings is about 6.5 mm.

The larvae feed on Picea crassifolia.
