= Archigraptis =

Scientific classification
- Kingdom: Animalia
- Phylum: Arthropoda
- Class: Insecta
- Order: Lepidoptera
- Family: Tortricidae
- Tribe: Tortricini
- Genus: Archigraptis; Razowski, 1964

Genus of tortrix moths

Archigraptis is a genus of moths belonging to the subfamily Tortricinae of the family Tortricidae.

== Species ==
- Archigraptis chrysodesma (Diakonoff, 1952)
- Archigraptis haemorrhaga Tuck, 1988
- Archigraptis limacina Razowski, 1964
- Archigraptis limacinoides Kuznetzov, 1992
- Archigraptis rosei Tuck, 1988
- Archigraptis stauroma (Diakonoff, 1968)
- Archigraptis strigifera Tuck, 1988

== See also ==
- List of Tortricidae genera
