= Asterolepis brandti =

Scientific classification
- Domain: Eukaryota
- Kingdom: Animalia
- Phylum: Arthropoda
- Class: Insecta
- Order: Lepidoptera
- Family: Tortricidae
- Genus: Asterolepis
- Species: A. brandti

Binomial name
- Asterolepis brandti Common, 1965

Species of moth

Asterolepis brandti is a species of moth of the family Tortricidae. It is found in Papua New Guinea.
