= Amboyna diapella =

Scientific classification
- Domain: Eukaryota
- Kingdom: Animalia
- Phylum: Arthropoda
- Class: Insecta
- Order: Lepidoptera
- Family: Tortricidae
- Genus: Amboyna
- Species: A. diapella

Binomial name
- Amboyna diapella Common, 1965

Species of moth

Amboyna diapella is a species of moth of the family Tortricidae. It is found in Australia, where it has been recorded from Queensland.

The wingspan is about 11.5 mm.
