= Paracroesia =

Scientific classification
- Kingdom: Animalia
- Phylum: Arthropoda
- Clade: Pancrustacea
- Class: Insecta
- Order: Lepidoptera
- Family: Tortricidae
- Tribe: Tortricini
- Genus: Paracroesia; Yasuda, 1972

Synonyms
- Danilevskiana Kuznetzov, 1973

Genus of tortrix moths

Paracroesia is a genus of moths belonging to the subfamily Tortricinae of the family Tortricidae. They are found mainly in Russia, Japan, and Korea.

== Species ==
- Paracroesia abievora Issiki, 1961 - The holotype (male) is at National Museum of Natural History, Washington, DC, USA. The type locality is Osaka Prefecture, Honshu, Japan.
- Paracroesia picevora Liu, 1990 The holotype (male) is at Institute of Zoology, Academia Sinica, Beijing, China. The type locality is Tianzhu, Gansu province, China.

== See also ==
- List of Tortricidae genera
