= Anaccra =

Scientific classification
- Domain: Eukaryota
- Kingdom: Animalia
- Phylum: Arthropoda
- Class: Insecta
- Order: Lepidoptera
- Family: Tortricidae
- Tribe: Tortricini
- Genus: Anaccra; Razowski, 1990

Genus of tortrix moths

Anaccra is a genus of moths belonging to the subfamily Tortricinae of the family Tortricidae.

== Species ==
- Anaccra camerunica (Razowski, 1966)
- Anaccra limitana (Razowski, 1966)

== See also ==
- List of Tortricidae genera
