= Cornesia molytes =

Scientific classification
- Domain: Eukaryota
- Kingdom: Animalia
- Phylum: Arthropoda
- Class: Insecta
- Order: Lepidoptera
- Family: Tortricidae
- Genus: Cornesia
- Species: C. molytes

Binomial name
- Cornesia molytes Razowski, 1993

Species of moth

Cornesia molytes is a species of moth of the family Tortricidae. It is found in Kenya.

The wingspan is about 12 mm.
