= Vellonifer =

Scientific classification
- Kingdom: Animalia
- Phylum: Arthropoda
- Class: Insecta
- Order: Lepidoptera
- Family: Tortricidae
- Tribe: Tortricini
- Genus: Vellonifer; Razowski, 1964
- Species: V. doncasteri

Binomial name
- Vellonifer doncasteri Razowski, 1964

Synonyms
- Vellomifer Razowski, 1964

Monotypic genus of tortrix moths

Vellonifer is a genus of moths belonging to the subfamily Tortricinae of the family Tortricidae. It contains only one species, Vellonifer doncasteri, which is found in the Indian state of Assam and in China.

== See also ==
- List of Tortricidae genera
