= Reptilisocia solomonensis =

Scientific classification
- Kingdom: Animalia
- Phylum: Arthropoda
- Class: Insecta
- Order: Lepidoptera
- Family: Tortricidae
- Genus: Reptilisocia
- Species: R. solomonensis

Binomial name
- Reptilisocia solomonensis Razowski, 2012

Species of moth

Reptilisocia solomonensis is a species of moth of the family Tortricidae. It is found on the Solomon Islands.

The wingspan is about 20 mm.

== Etymology ==
The species name refers to the country of origin, the Solomon Islands.
