= Trophocosta nitens =

Scientific classification
- Kingdom: Animalia
- Phylum: Arthropoda
- Class: Insecta
- Order: Lepidoptera
- Family: Tortricidae
- Genus: Trophocosta
- Species: T. nitens

Binomial name
- Trophocosta nitens Razowski, 1964

Synonyms
- Trophocosta nites Razowski, 1964

Species of moth

Trophocosta nitens is a species of moth of the family Tortricidae. It is found in New Guinea.
