= Latibulocrinis =

Scientific classification
- Kingdom: Animalia
- Phylum: Arthropoda
- Class: Insecta
- Order: Lepidoptera
- Family: Tortricidae
- Tribe: Tortricini
- Genus: Latibulocrinis; Tuck, 1986
- Species: L. curiosa

Binomial name
- Latibulocrinis curiosa Tuck, 1986

Monotypic genus of tortrix moths

Latibulocrinis is a genus of moths belonging to the subfamily Tortricinae of the family Tortricidae. It contains only one species, Latibulocrinis curiosa, which is found in Brunei and Indonesia (Buru).

== See also ==
- List of Tortricidae genera
