= Eboda ethnia =

Scientific classification
- Kingdom: Animalia
- Phylum: Arthropoda
- Class: Insecta
- Order: Lepidoptera
- Family: Tortricidae
- Genus: Eboda
- Species: E. ethnia

Binomial name
- Eboda ethnia Razowski, 1991

Species of moth

Eboda ethnia is a species of moth of the family Tortricidae. It is found in India (Sikkim).
