= Congoprinsia =

Cnesteboda

Scientific classification
- Kingdom: Animalia
- Phylum: Arthropoda
- Class: Insecta
- Order: Lepidoptera
- Family: Tortricidae
- Tribe: Tortricini
- Genus: Congoprinsia; Razowski, 2012
- Species: C. juratae

Binomial name
- Congoprinsia juratae Razowski, 2012

Genus of moths

Congoprinsia is a genus of moths belonging to the family Tortricidae. It contains only one species, Congoprinsia juratae, which is found in the Democratic Republic of the Congo.

The wingspan is 12–14.5 mm.

== See also ==
- List of Tortricidae genera
