= Amboyna furcifera =

Scientific classification
- Kingdom: Animalia
- Phylum: Arthropoda
- Class: Insecta
- Order: Lepidoptera
- Family: Tortricidae
- Genus: Amboyna
- Species: A. furcifera

Binomial name
- Amboyna furcifera Razowski, 1964

Species of moth

Amboyna furcifera is a species of moth of the family Tortricidae. It is found in Indonesia, where it has been recorded from Ambon Island.
