= Cordatijuxta =

Scientific classification
- Kingdom: Animalia
- Phylum: Arthropoda
- Class: Insecta
- Order: Lepidoptera
- Family: Tortricidae
- Tribe: Tortricini
- Genus: Cordatijuxta; Razowski, 2012
- Species: C. thailandiae

Binomial name
- Cordatijuxta thailandiae Razowski, 2012

Genus of moths

Cordatijuxta is a genus of moths belonging to the family Tortricidae. It contains only one species, Cordatijuxta thailandiae, which is found in Thailand.

The wingspan is 16 mm.

== Etymology ==
The genus name refers to the shape of the juxta and is derived from Latin cordatus (meaning heart-shaped). The species is named after the country of origin.

== See also ==
- List of Tortricidae genera
