= Eboda chrisitis =

Scientific classification
- Domain: Eukaryota
- Kingdom: Animalia
- Phylum: Arthropoda
- Class: Insecta
- Order: Lepidoptera
- Family: Tortricidae
- Genus: Eboda
- Species: E. chrisitis

Binomial name
- Eboda chrisitis Razowski, 1964

Species of moth

Eboda chrisitis is a species of moth of the family Tortricidae. It is found on Borneo.
