= Reptilisocia paryphaea =

Scientific classification
- Kingdom: Animalia
- Phylum: Arthropoda
- Class: Insecta
- Order: Lepidoptera
- Family: Tortricidae
- Genus: Reptilisocia
- Species: R. paryphaea

Binomial name
- Reptilisocia paryphaea (Meyrick, 1907)

Synonyms
- Spatalistis paryphaea Meyrick, 1907

Species of moth

Reptilisocia paryphaea is a species of moth of the family Tortricidae. It is found in India (Assam).

The wingspan is 14–17 mm. The forewings are ferruginous-reddish somewhat mixed with pale yellowish towards the dorsal half posteriorly, suffused with fuscous on the basal half and along the costa posteriorly and at the termen. There are oblique striae of purplish-leaden suffusion. The hindwings are pale greyish-ochreous, the apex suffused with fuscous.
