= Stenotenes incudis =

Scientific classification
- Domain: Eukaryota
- Kingdom: Animalia
- Phylum: Arthropoda
- Class: Insecta
- Order: Lepidoptera
- Family: Tortricidae
- Genus: Stenotenes
- Species: S. incudis

Binomial name
- Stenotenes incudis Diakonoff, 1954

Species of moth

Stenotenes incudis is a species of moth of the family Tortricidae. It is found in New Guinea.
