= Cornesia =

Scientific classification
- Kingdom: Animalia
- Phylum: Arthropoda
- Class: Insecta
- Order: Lepidoptera
- Family: Tortricidae
- Tribe: Tortricini
- Genus: Cornesia; Razowski, 1981

Genus of tortrix moths

Cornesia is a genus of moths belonging to the family Tortricidae.

== Species ==
- Cornesia arabuco Razowski, 2012
- Cornesia molytes Razowski, 1993
- Cornesia ormoperla Razowski, 1981

== See also ==
- List of Tortricidae genera
