= Archigraptis limacinoides =

Scientific classification
- Domain: Eukaryota
- Kingdom: Animalia
- Phylum: Arthropoda
- Class: Insecta
- Order: Lepidoptera
- Family: Tortricidae
- Genus: Archigraptis
- Species: A. limacinoides

Binomial name
- Archigraptis limacinoides Kuznetzov, 1992

Species of moth

Archigraptis limacinoides is a species of moth of the family Tortricidae. It is found in southern Vietnam.
