= Trophocosta nummifera =

Scientific classification
- Domain: Eukaryota
- Kingdom: Animalia
- Phylum: Arthropoda
- Class: Insecta
- Order: Lepidoptera
- Family: Tortricidae
- Genus: Trophocosta
- Species: T. nummifera

Binomial name
- Trophocosta nummifera (Meyrick, 1910)

Synonyms
- Spatalistis nummifera Meyrick, 1910; Trophocosta multiastra Razowski, 1964; Spatalistis perusta Diakonoff, 1953

Species of moth

Trophocosta nummifera is a species of moth of the family Tortricidae. It is found in New Guinea.

The wingspan is about 11 mm. The forewings are clear yellow, with scattered ferruginous-orange dots and strigula. There are three small patches on the costa at the base, at one-third and beyond the middle, mixed with fuscous and spotted with bright leaden-metallic. There is also a patch on the middle of the dorsum and a large irregular patch on the tornus and lower part of the termen reaching half across the wing. This patch is ferruginous-orange, somewhat mixed with fuscous and spotted with bright leaden-metallic. There are several small pale metallic spots towards the apex. The hindwings are grey, but rather darker posteriorly.
