= Reptilisocia impetigo =

Scientific classification
- Domain: Eukaryota
- Kingdom: Animalia
- Phylum: Arthropoda
- Class: Insecta
- Order: Lepidoptera
- Family: Tortricidae
- Genus: Reptilisocia
- Species: R. impetigo

Binomial name
- Reptilisocia impetigo Razowski, 2012

Species of moth

Reptilisocia impetigo is a species of moth of the family Tortricidae. It is found in Papua New Guinea.

The wingspan is about 18 mm.

== Etymology ==
The species name refers to coloration of the forewings and is derived from Latin impedigo (meaning a lichen).
