= Archigraptis limacina =

Scientific classification
- Kingdom: Animalia
- Phylum: Arthropoda
- Class: Insecta
- Order: Lepidoptera
- Family: Tortricidae
- Genus: Archigraptis
- Species: A. limacina

Binomial name
- Archigraptis limacina Razowski, 1964

Species of moth

Archigraptis limacina is a species of moth of the family Tortricidae. It is found in Burma and Thailand.
