= Tymbarcha cerinopa =

Scientific classification
- Domain: Eukaryota
- Kingdom: Animalia
- Phylum: Arthropoda
- Class: Insecta
- Order: Lepidoptera
- Family: Tortricidae
- Genus: Tymbarcha
- Species: T. cerinopa

Binomial name
- Tymbarcha cerinopa Meyrick, 1908

Species of moth

Tymbarcha cerinopa is a species of moth of the family Tortricidae. It is commonly found in Eastern India (Assam).

The wingspan of this moth is about 13 mm. The forewings are whitish-ochreous, the veins more ochreous, strewn with small tufts of scales finely sprinkled with blackish, tending to be arranged in transverse series. The basal patch, a narrow central fascia starting from a small whitish spot on the costa, and a streak along the posterior part of the costa and termen are suffusedly glistening silvery-whitish. The hindwings are pale whitish-grey-ochreous.
