= Reptilisocia gunungana =

Scientific classification
- Domain: Eukaryota
- Kingdom: Animalia
- Phylum: Arthropoda
- Class: Insecta
- Order: Lepidoptera
- Family: Tortricidae
- Genus: Reptilisocia
- Species: R. gunungana

Binomial name
- Reptilisocia gunungana Razowski, 2013

Species of moth

Reptilisocia gunungana is a species of moth of the family Tortricidae first described by Józef Razowski in 2013. It is found on Seram Island in Indonesia.

The wingspan is about 16 mm.
