= Nephograptis =

Scientific classification
- Kingdom: Animalia
- Phylum: Arthropoda
- Class: Insecta
- Order: Lepidoptera
- Family: Tortricidae
- Tribe: Tortricini
- Genus: Nephograptis; Razowski, 1981
- Species: N. necropina

Binomial name
- Nephograptis necropina Razowski, 1981

Monotypic genus of tortrix moths

Nephograptis is a genus of moths belonging to the family Tortricidae. It contains only one species, Nephograptis necropina, which is found in Nigeria.

== See also ==
- List of Tortricidae genera
