= Asterolepis glycera =

Scientific classification
- Domain: Eukaryota
- Kingdom: Animalia
- Phylum: Arthropoda
- Class: Insecta
- Order: Lepidoptera
- Family: Tortricidae
- Genus: Asterolepis
- Species: A. glycera

Binomial name
- Asterolepis glycera (Meyrick, 1910)

Synonyms
- Tymbarcha glycera Meyrick, 1910

Species of insect

Asterolepis glycera is a species of moth of the family Tortricidae. It is found in Australia, where it has been recorded from Queensland.

The wingspan is about 13 mm (0.51 in). The forewings are whitish-ochreous with ochreous markings, infuscated on the costa and with numerous tufts of raised scales, as well as a few scattered black specks. The central fascia is distinct on the costal half, moderate and terminated beneath by a black scale tuft in the middle of the disc. There are four or five small spots on the costa posteriorly, and indications of striae proceeding from these. The hindwings are grey-whitish.
