= Eboda =

Scientific classification
- Kingdom: Animalia
- Phylum: Arthropoda
- Class: Insecta
- Order: Lepidoptera
- Family: Tortricidae
- Tribe: Tortricini
- Genus: Eboda; Walker, 1866

Genus of tortrix moths

Eboda is a genus of moths belonging to the family Tortricidae.

== Species ==
- Eboda bryochlora Diakonoff, 1960
- Eboda chloroclistis Razowski, 1964
- Eboda chrisitis Razowski, 1964
- Eboda diakonoffi Razowski, 1964
- Eboda discobola Diakonoff, 1948
- Eboda dissimilis Liu & Bai, 1986
- Eboda ethnia Razowski, 1991
- Eboda smaragdinana Walker, 1866
- Eboda virescens Razowski, 1964

== See also ==
- List of Tortricidae genera
