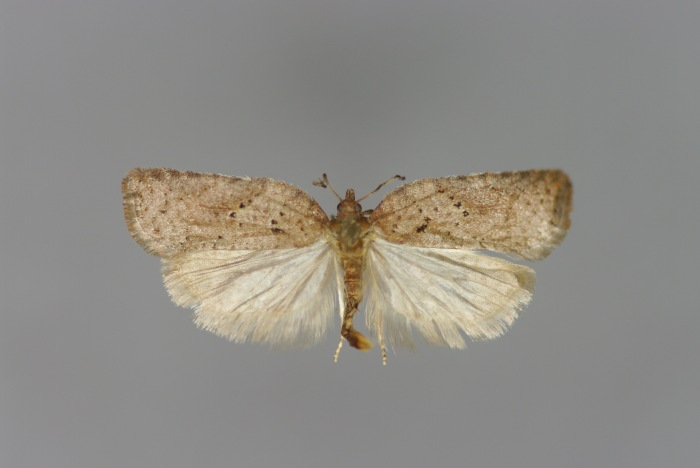
- Acleris schalleriana, Schaller's acleris moth, size: 7.7 mm

Scientific classification
- Kingdom: Animalia
- Phylum: Arthropoda
- Clade: Pancrustacea
- Class: Insecta
- Order: Lepidoptera
- Family: Tortricidae
- Genus: Acleris
- Species: A. schalleriana

Binomial name
- Acleris schalleriana (Linnaeus, [1761)])

Synonyms
- Phalaena (Tortrix) schalleriana Linnaeus, 1761; Tortrix castaneana Haworth, [1811]; Tortrix erutana Herrich-Schaffer, 1847; Tortrix (Teras) erutana Herrich-Schaffer, 1851; Lopas falsana Hubner, [1825] 1816; Teras tristana famula Zeller, 1875; Tortrix germarana Frolich, 1828; Tortrix hirundana Thunberg & Becklin, 1791; Tortrix plumbosana Haworth, [1811]; Peronea semirhombana Curtis, 1834; Peronea (Lopas) trigonana Stephens, 1834; Peronea viburnana Clemens, 1860; Teras violaceana Guenee, 1845

= Acleris schalleriana =

Species of moth

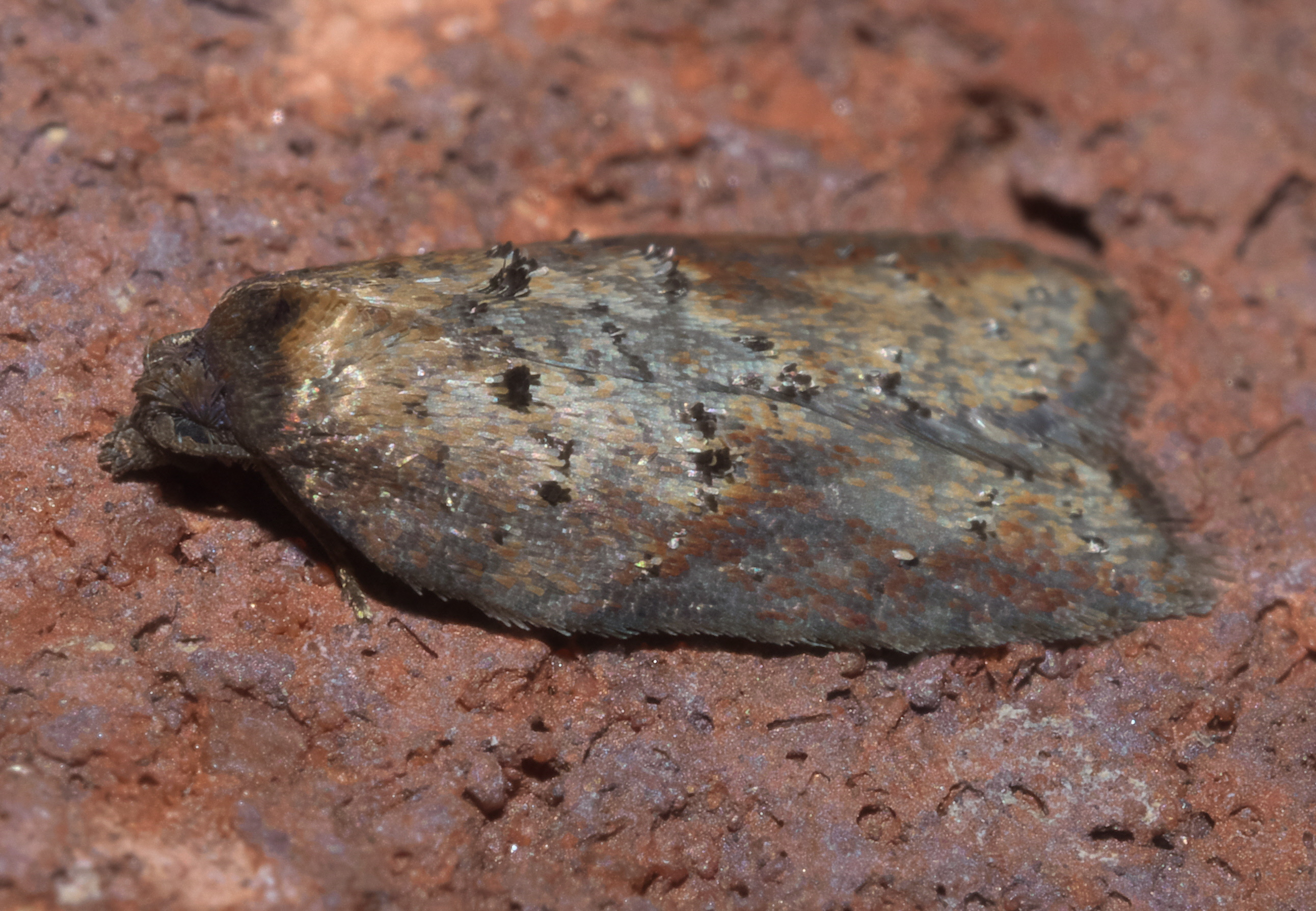
Acleris schalleriana, Schaller's acleris moth

Acleris schalleriana, the viburnum button or Schaller's acleris moth, is a moth of the family Tortricidae. It was described by Carl Linnaeus in 1761. It is found in most of Europe. It is also found in North America. Acleris viburnana is a possible synonym that refers to the North American populations.

The wingspan is 15–20 mm. The forewings are oblong, ochreous-grey to ochreous-brown, sometimes darker-strigulated. There is a moderately large tuft on the submedian fold before the middle, one in middle of disc, and scattered smaller tufts, often black. The edge of the basal patch is sometimes darker dorsally and there is a large triangular red -brown or dark fuscous blotch on the costa, sometimes whitish-edged anteriorly. The hindwings are grey. The larva is green; head brownish Julius von Kennel provides a full description.

Adults are on wing from August to October, they overwinter and reappear the following spring.

The larvae feed on Viburnum species, including Viburnum lantana and Viburnum opulus. They twist a leaf to form a pocket and feed from within.

== Life cycle ==
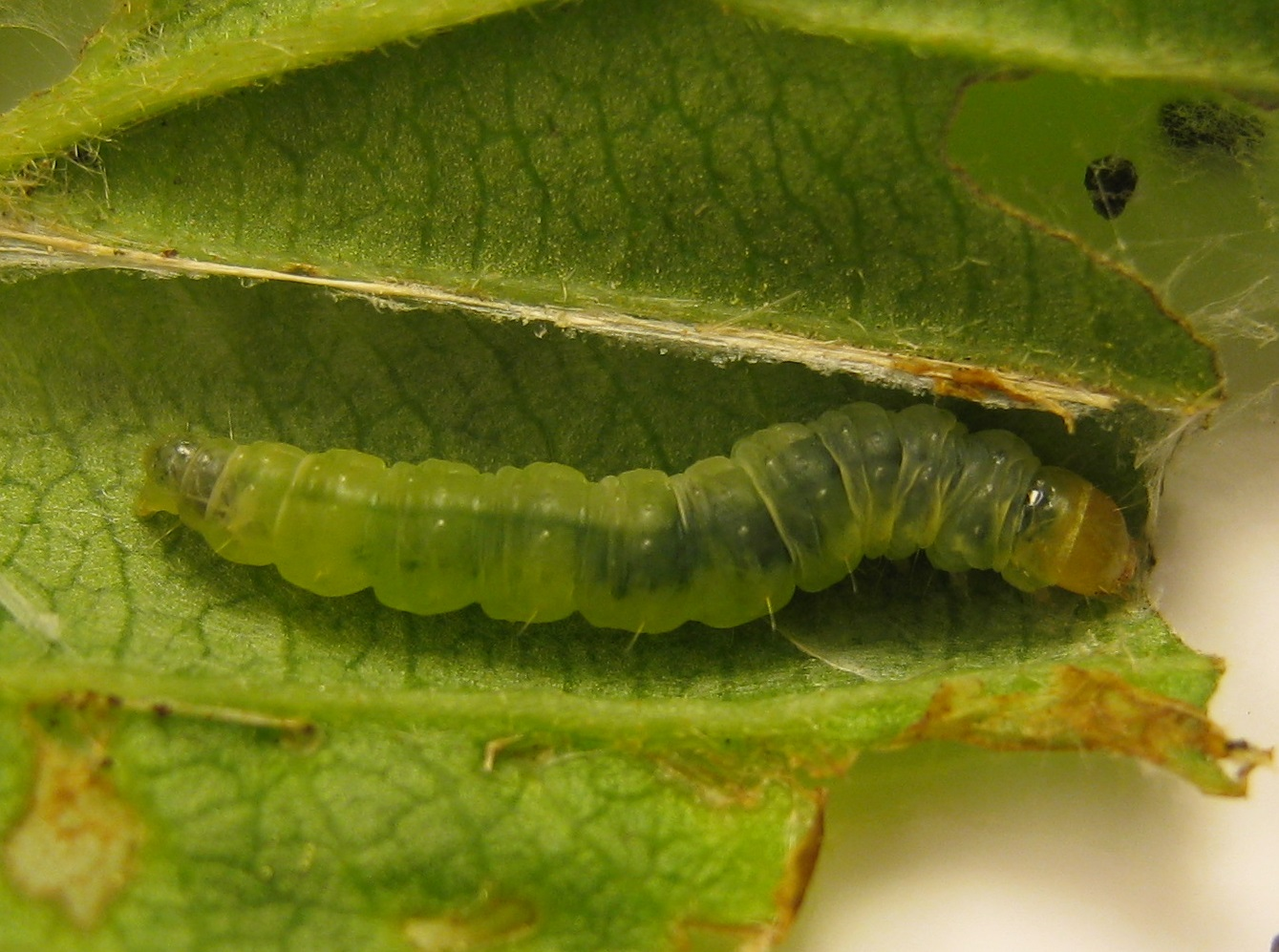
Caterpillar inside rolled leaf of Viburnum dentatum

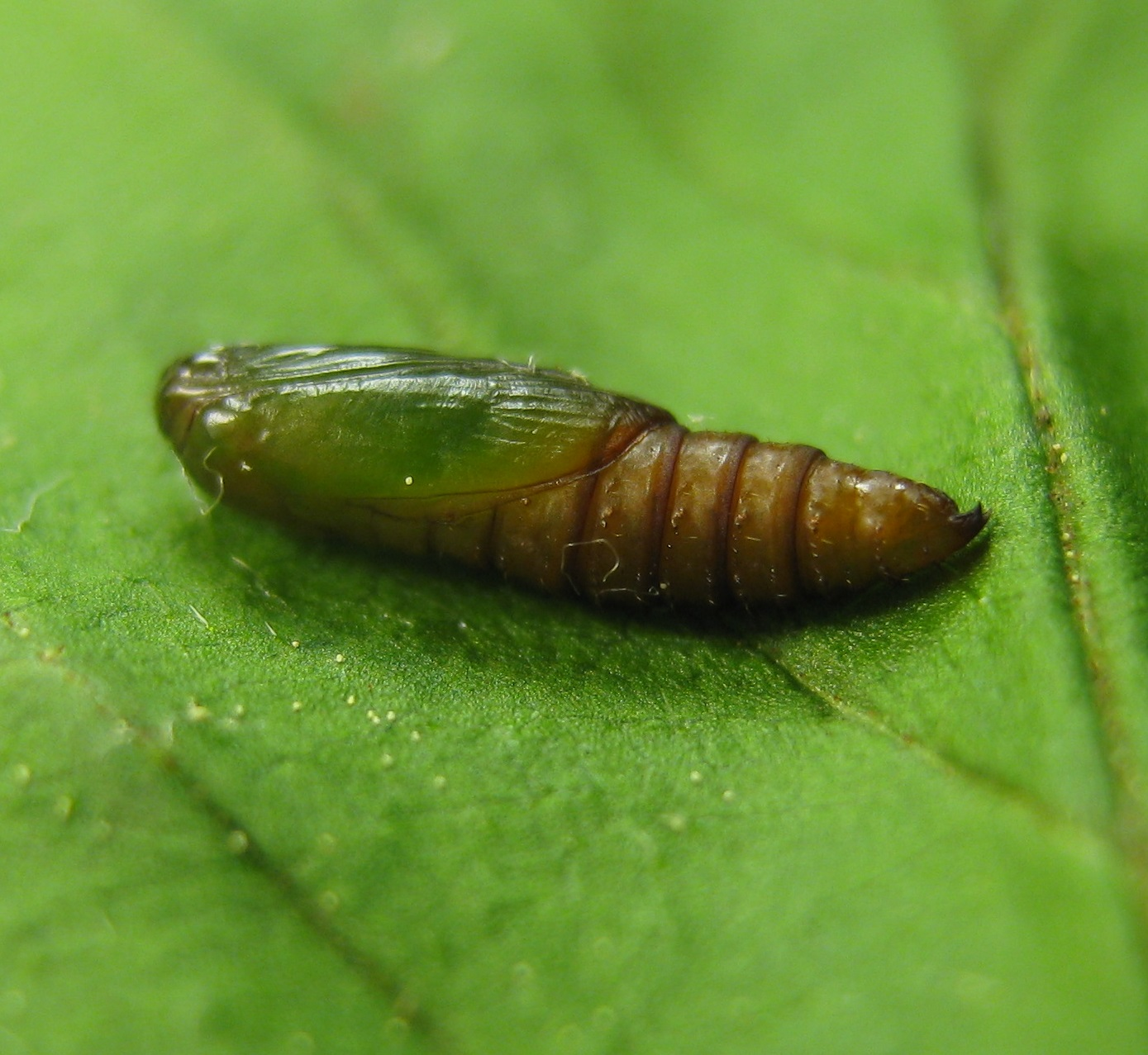
Pupa

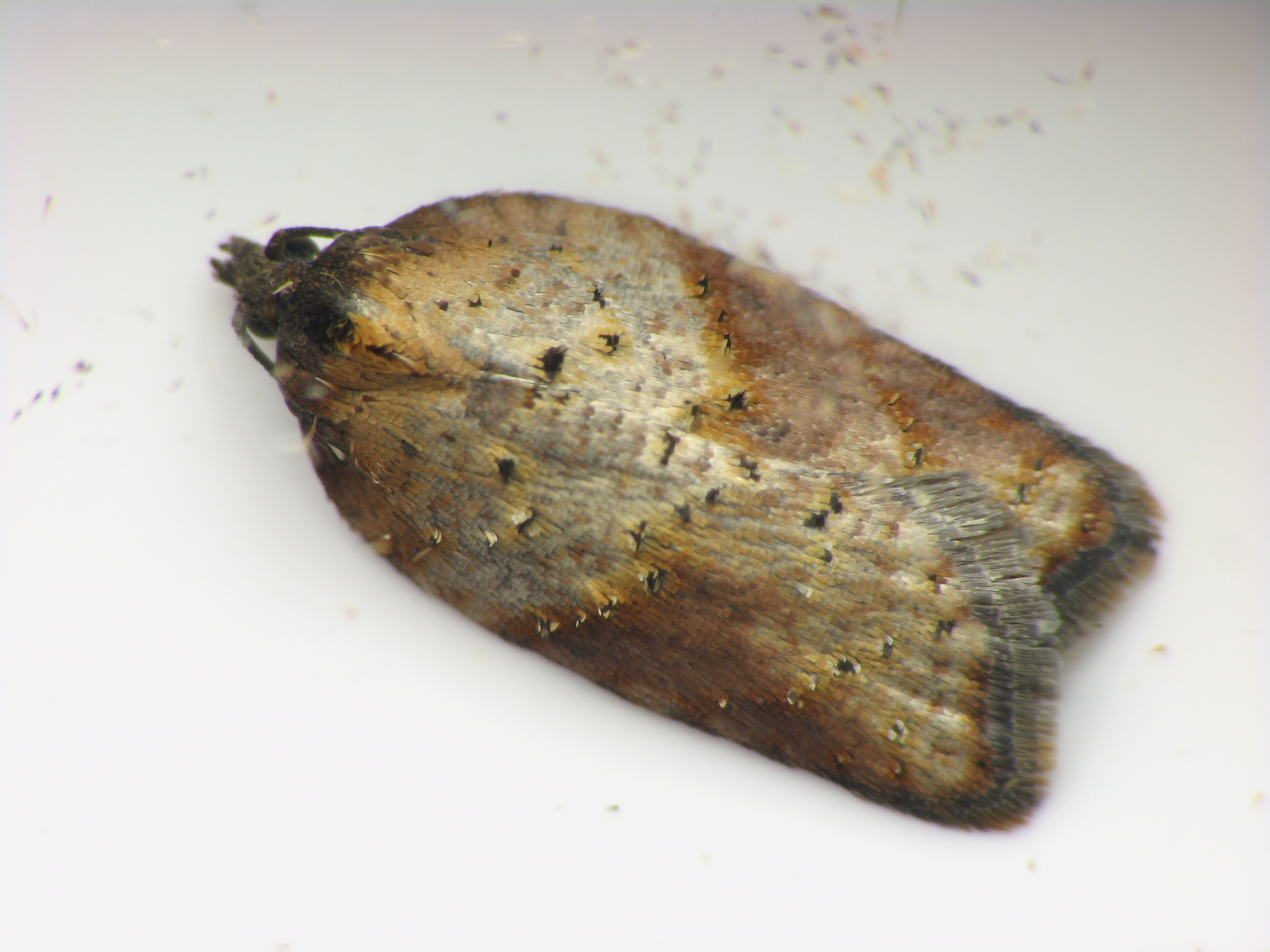
Adult
