= Pseudeboda gambiae =

Scientific classification
- Domain: Eukaryota
- Kingdom: Animalia
- Phylum: Arthropoda
- Class: Insecta
- Order: Lepidoptera
- Family: Tortricidae
- Genus: Pseudeboda
- Species: P. gambiae

Binomial name
- Pseudeboda gambiae Razowski, 1964

Species of moth

Pseudeboda gambiae is a species of moth of the family Tortricidae. It is found in Gambia.
