= Asterolepis (moth) =

Scientific classification
- Domain: Eukaryota
- Kingdom: Animalia
- Phylum: Arthropoda
- Class: Insecta
- Order: Lepidoptera
- Family: Tortricidae
- Tribe: Tortricini
- Genus: Asterolepis; Razowski, 1964

Genus of tortrix moths

Asterolepis is a genus of moths belonging to the subfamily Tortricinae of the family Tortricidae.

== Species ==
- Asterolepis brandti Common, 1965
- Asterolepis chlorissa (Razowski, 1966)
- Asterolepis cypta Razowski, 2012
- Asterolepis dipterocarpi Razowski, 2012
- Asterolepis earina Common, 1965
- Asterolepis engis Razowski, 2012
- Asterolepis glycera (Meyrick, 1910)

== See also ==
- List of Tortricidae genera
