= Asterolepis cypta =

Scientific classification
- Kingdom: Animalia
- Phylum: Arthropoda
- Class: Insecta
- Order: Lepidoptera
- Family: Tortricidae
- Genus: Asterolepis
- Species: A. cypta

Binomial name
- Asterolepis cypta Razowski, 2012

Species of moth

Asterolepis cypta is a species of moth of the family Tortricidae. It is found in Brunei. The habitat consists of dipterocarp forests.

The wingspan is 13–14 mm.
