= Archigraptis chrysodesma =

Scientific classification
- Domain: Eukaryota
- Kingdom: Animalia
- Phylum: Arthropoda
- Class: Insecta
- Order: Lepidoptera
- Family: Tortricidae
- Genus: Archigraptis
- Species: A. chrysodesma

Binomial name
- Archigraptis chrysodesma (Diakonoff, 1952)

Synonyms
- Polemograptis chrysodesma Diakonoff, 1952

Species of moth

Archigraptis chrysodesma is a species of moth of the family Tortricidae. It is found in Papua New Guinea, Malaysia and Indonesia (Obi Major, West Irian, Moluccas).
