= Trophocosta tucki =

Scientific classification
- Kingdom: Animalia
- Phylum: Arthropoda
- Class: Insecta
- Order: Lepidoptera
- Family: Tortricidae
- Genus: Trophocosta
- Species: T. tucki

Binomial name
- Trophocosta tucki Razowski, 1986

Species of moth

Trophocosta tucki is a species of moth of the family Tortricidae. It is found in Nepal.
