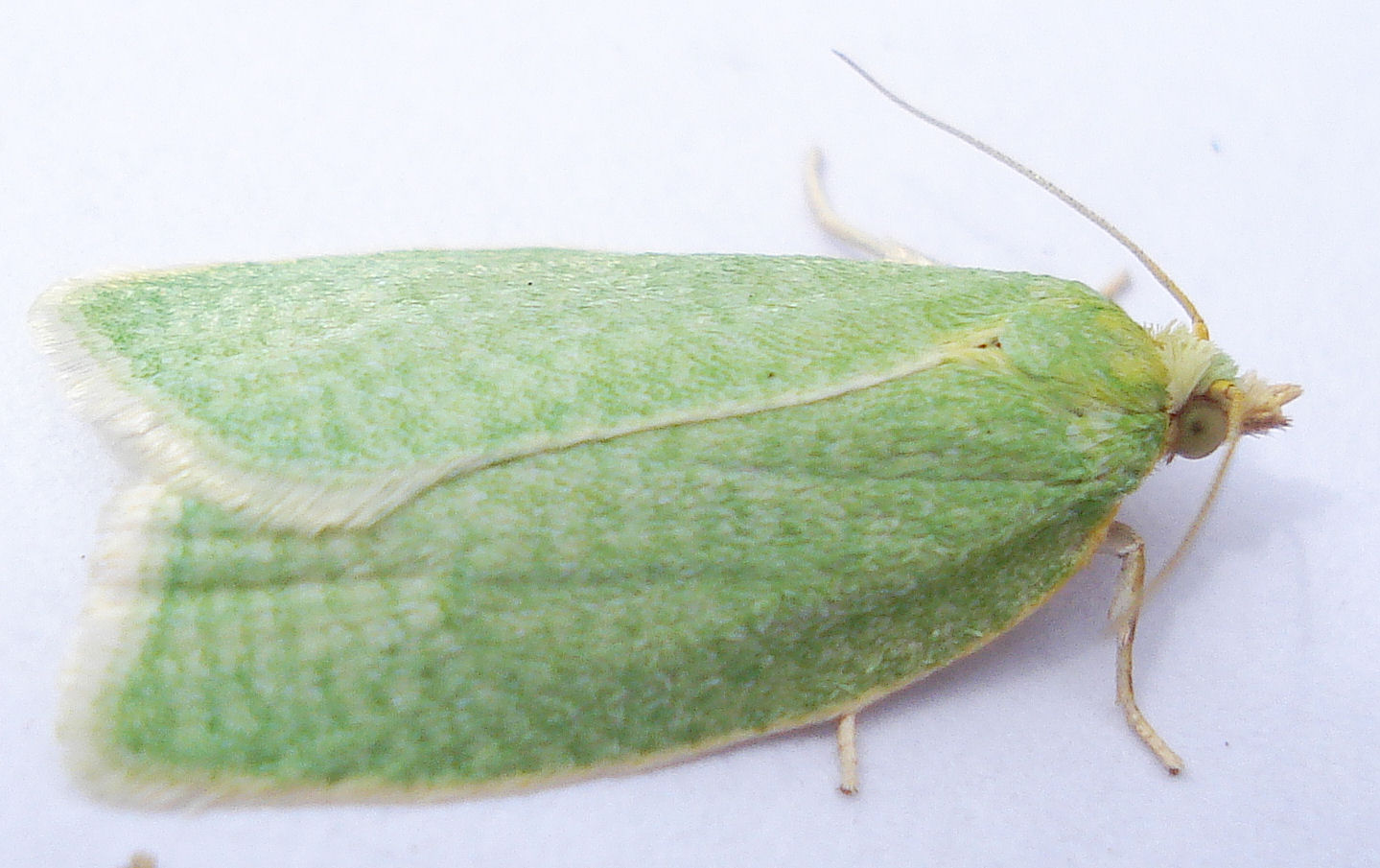
- Tortrix viridana

Scientific classification
- Kingdom: Animalia
- Phylum: Arthropoda
- Class: Insecta
- Order: Lepidoptera
- Family: Tortricidae
- Tribe: Tortricini
- Genus: Tortrix; Linnaeus, 1758

Synonyms
- Heterognomon Lederer, 1859

= Tortrix =

Genus of moths

Tortrix is a genus of moths belonging to the family Tortricidae.

== Species ==
- Tortrix sinapina (Butler, 1879)
- Tortrix viridana Linnaeus, 1758

=== Species formally assigned to Tortrix ===
Several fossil species were formerly assigned to the genus, but have subsequently been transferred to other genera.

- †Tortrix? destructus (now Paleolepidopterites destructus)
- †Tortrix? florissantana (now Paleolepidopterites florissantana)

== See also ==
- List of Tortricidae genera
