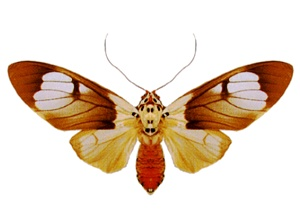
- Amerila crokeri

Scientific classification
- Kingdom: Animalia
- Phylum: Arthropoda
- Clade: Pancrustacea
- Class: Insecta
- Order: Lepidoptera
- Superfamily: Noctuoidea
- Family: Erebidae
- Subfamily: Arctiinae
- Tribe: Amerilini; Dubatolov, 2010
- Genus: Amerila; Walker, 1855

Synonyms
- Euthoracia Hulstaert, 1923; Canopus Walker, 1855; Phryganeomorpha Wallengren, 1858; Amblythyris Mabille, 1879; Gastrochrysia Kiriakoff, 1954

= Amerila =

Genus of moths

Amerila is a genus of moths in the subfamily Arctiinae.

The genus is placed in a monotypic tribe Amerilini, described by Vladimir Viktorovitch Dubatolov in 2010. They are sometimes (e.g. in the "Erebidae" scheme) incorrectly merged into the Phaegopterini, but morphologically the tribe is related to Callimorphini. The elder name Rhodogastriini Kiriakoff, 1950 was based on incorrectly determined genus Rhodogastria (=Amerila in modern sense).

== Species ==
- Amerila abdominalis (Rothschild, 1933)
- Amerila accra (Strand, 1919)
- Amerila affinis (Rothschild, 1910)
- Amerila alberti (Rothschild, 1910)
- Amerila albivitrea (Hampson, 1901)
- Amerila aldabrensis (Fryer, 1912)
- Amerila androfusca (Pinhey, 1952)
- Amerila arthusbertrand (Guérin-Méneville, 1830)
- Amerila astreus (Drury, 1773)
- Amerila bauri (Möschler, 1884)
- Amerila bipartita (Rothschild, 1910)
- Amerila brunnea (Hampson, 1901)
- Amerila bubo (Walker, 1855)
- Amerila castanea (Hampson, 1911)
- Amerila catinca Häuser et Boppre, 1997
- Amerila cynira (Muller, 1980), nomen nudum
- Amerila crokeri (MacLeay, 1826)
- Amerila curta (Rothschild, 1917)
- Amerila erythropus (Rothschild, 1917)
- Amerila eugenia (Fabricius, 1794)
- Amerila femina (Berio, 1935)
- Amerila fennia (Druce, 1887)
- Amerila fumida (Swinhoe, 1901)
- Amerila fuscivena (Hampson, 1916)
- Amerila howardi (Pinhey, 1955)
- Amerila kiellandi Häuser et Boppre, 1997
- Amerila kuehni (Rothschild, 1910)
- Amerila lactea (Rothschild, 1910)
- Amerila leucoptera (Hampson, 1901)
- Amerila lineolata (Kiriakoff, 1954)
- Amerila lucida (Muller, 1980), nomen nudum
- Amerila lupia (Druce, 1887)
- Amerila luteibarba (Hampson, 1901)
- Amerila madagascariensis (Boisduval, 1847)
- Amerila magnifica (Rothschild, 1910)
- Amerila makadara Häuser et Boppre, 1997
- Amerila mulleri Häuser et Boppre, 1997
- Amerila myrrha (Muller, 1980), nomen nudum
- Amerila nigrivenosa (Grünberg, 1910)
- Amerila nigroapicalis (Aurivillius, 1900)
- Amerila nigropunctata (Bethune-Baker, 1908)
- Amerila niveivitrea (Bartel, 1903)
- Amerila omissa (Rothschild, 1910)
- Amerila phaedra Weymer, 1892
- Amerila piepersii Snellen, 1879
- Amerila puella (Fabricius, [1794])
- Amerila rhodopa Walker, 1865
- Amerila roseomarginata (Rothschild, 1910)
- Amerila rubripes Walker, 1865
- Amerila rufifemur (Walker, 1855)
- Amerila rufitarsis (Rothschild, 1917)
- Amerila serica Meyrick, 1886
- Amerila shimbaensis Häuser et Boppre, 1997
- Amerila simillima (Rothschild, 1917)
- Amerila syntomina (Butler, 1878)
- Amerila thermochroa (Hampson, 1916)
- Amerila timolis (Rothschild, 1914)
- Amerila vidua (Cramer, 1780)
- Amerila vitrea Plötz, 1880

=== Incorrectly placed species ===
- Amerila atrivena Hampson, 1907 (in Dubatolovia, Spilosomini)
- Amerila hersilia Druce, 1887 (in Caryatis, Nyctemerini)
- Amerila phileta (Drury, 1782) (in Caryatis, Nyctemerini)
- Amerila stenoperas Hampson, 1910 (in Caryatis, Nyctemerini)

==== Note ====
Caryatis species are not morphologically related to Amerila.
