= Amerila howardi =

Scientific classification
- Kingdom: Animalia
- Phylum: Arthropoda
- Clade: Pancrustacea
- Class: Insecta
- Order: Lepidoptera
- Superfamily: Noctuoidea
- Family: Erebidae
- Subfamily: Arctiinae
- Genus: Amerila
- Species: A. howardi

Binomial name
- Amerila howardi (Pinhey, 1955)

Synonyms
- Rhodogastria howardi Pinhey, 1955

Species of moth

Amerila howardi is a moth of the subfamily Arctiinae. It was described by Elliot Pinhey in 1955. It is found in Tanzania.
