= Amerila androfusca =

Scientific classification
- Domain: Eukaryota
- Kingdom: Animalia
- Phylum: Arthropoda
- Class: Insecta
- Order: Lepidoptera
- Superfamily: Noctuoidea
- Family: Erebidae
- Subfamily: Arctiinae
- Genus: Amerila
- Species: A. androfusca

Binomial name
- Amerila androfusca (Pinhey, 1952)

Synonyms
- Rhodogastria androfusca Pinhey, 1952

Species of moth

Amerila androfusca is a moth of the subfamily Arctiinae. It was described by Elliot Pinhey in 1952. It is found in Kenya and Tanzania.
