= Porpax =

Porpax may refer to:

- Porpax (dragonfly), a genus of dragonflies
- Porpax (plant), a genus of orchids
- Porpax (mythology), in Greek mythology, one of the river gods
- Porpax, the central strap of an Ancient Greek aspis or porpax shield
