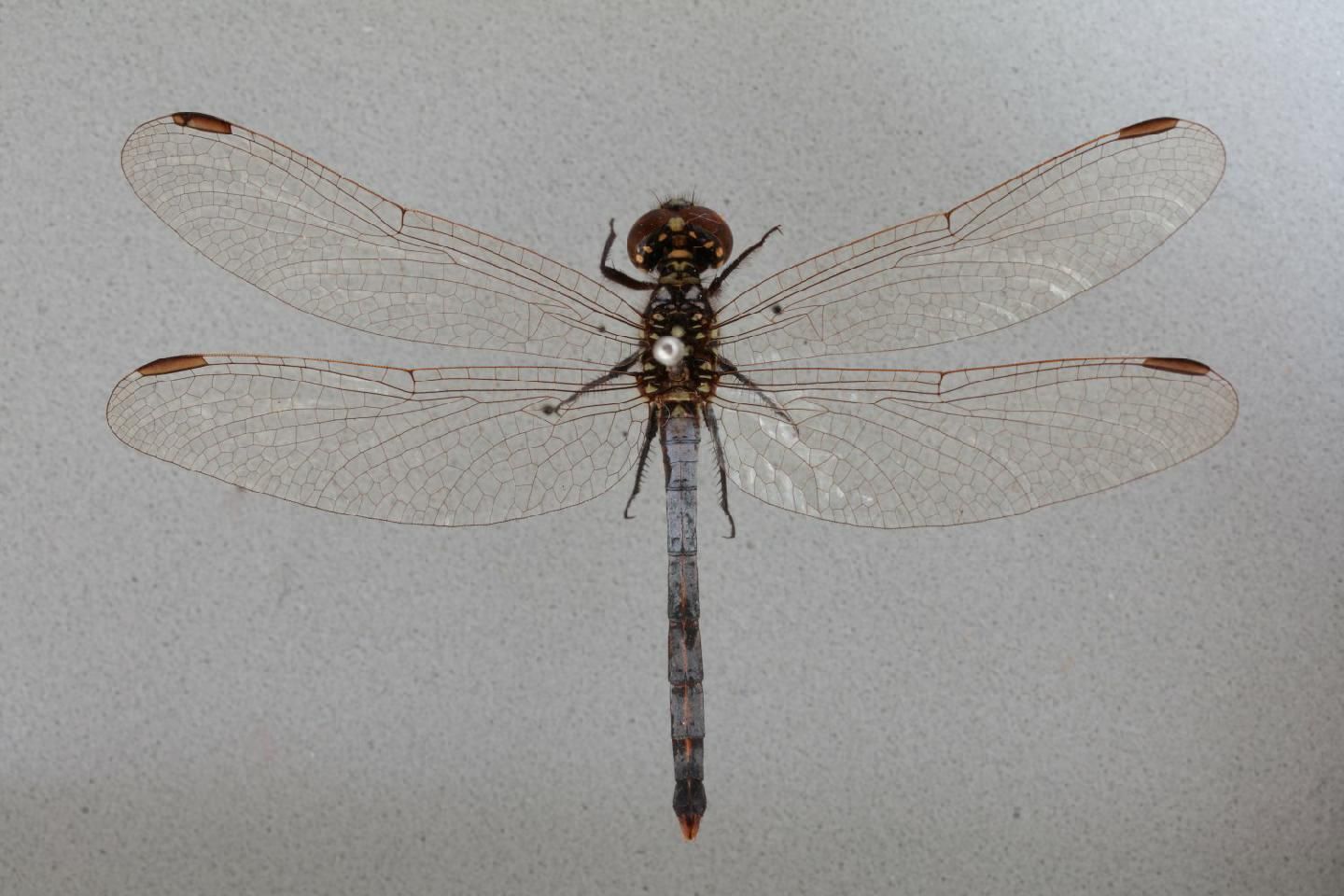

Conservation status
- Least Concern (IUCN 3.1)

Scientific classification
- Kingdom: Animalia
- Phylum: Arthropoda
- Class: Insecta
- Order: Odonata
- Infraorder: Anisoptera
- Family: Libellulidae
- Genus: Porpax
- Species: P. risi

Binomial name
- Porpax risi Pinhey, 1958

= Porpax risi =

Species of dragonfly

Porpax risi is a species of dragonfly in the family Libellulidae. It is found in Angola, Malawi, Mozambique, Zambia, and Zimbabwe. Its natural habitats are swamps and intermittent freshwater marshes.
