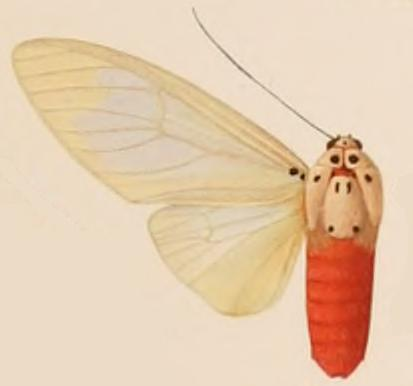

Scientific classification
- Kingdom: Animalia
- Phylum: Arthropoda
- Class: Insecta
- Order: Lepidoptera
- Superfamily: Noctuoidea
- Family: Erebidae
- Subfamily: Arctiinae
- Genus: Amerila
- Species: A. serica

Binomial name
- Amerila serica Meyrick, 1886

= Amerila serica =

Species of moth

Amerila serica is a moth of the subfamily Arctiinae first described by Edward Meyrick in 1886. It is found in the Australian states of New South Wales and Queensland.
