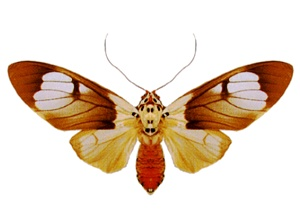

Scientific classification
- Domain: Eukaryota
- Kingdom: Animalia
- Phylum: Arthropoda
- Class: Insecta
- Order: Lepidoptera
- Superfamily: Noctuoidea
- Family: Erebidae
- Subfamily: Arctiinae
- Genus: Amerila
- Species: A. crokeri

Binomial name
- Amerila crokeri W. S. Macleay, 1826

Synonyms
- Euprepia crokeri; Amerila brachyleuca; Rhodogastria croceri; Rhodogastria novobritannica; Rhodogastria salomonis; Rhodogastria kajana; Rhodogastria bakeri; Rhodogastria papuana

= Amerila crokeri =

Species of moth

Amerila crokeri, or Croker's frother, is a moth of the subfamily Arctiinae. The species was first described by William Sharp Macleay in 1826. It is found in the Australian states of New South Wales and Queensland and on New Guinea and New Britain.

The wingspan is about 50 mm.
