= Amerila erythropus =

Scientific classification
- Domain: Eukaryota
- Kingdom: Animalia
- Phylum: Arthropoda
- Class: Insecta
- Order: Lepidoptera
- Superfamily: Noctuoidea
- Family: Erebidae
- Subfamily: Arctiinae
- Genus: Amerila
- Species: A. erythropus

Binomial name
- Amerila erythropus (Rothschild, 1917)

Synonyms
- Rhodogastria erythropus Rothschild, 1917

Species of moth

Amerila erythropus is a moth of the subfamily Arctiinae. It was described by Walter Rothschild in 1917. It is found on the Umboi Islands of Papua New Guinea.
