= Amerila nigropunctata =

Scientific classification
- Domain: Eukaryota
- Kingdom: Animalia
- Phylum: Arthropoda
- Class: Insecta
- Order: Lepidoptera
- Superfamily: Noctuoidea
- Family: Erebidae
- Subfamily: Arctiinae
- Genus: Amerila
- Species: A. nigropunctata

Binomial name
- Amerila nigropunctata (Bethune-Baker, 1908)

Synonyms
- Rhodogastria nigropunctata Bethune-Baker, 1908

Species of moth

Amerila nigropunctata is a moth of the subfamily Arctiinae. It was described by George Thomas Bethune-Baker in 1908. It is found in south-eastern New Guinea.
