= Amerila madagascariensis =

Scientific classification
- Domain: Eukaryota
- Kingdom: Animalia
- Phylum: Arthropoda
- Class: Insecta
- Order: Lepidoptera
- Superfamily: Noctuoidea
- Family: Erebidae
- Subfamily: Arctiinae
- Genus: Amerila
- Species: A. madagascariensis

Binomial name
- Amerila madagascariensis (Boisduval, 1847)

Synonyms
- Chelonia madagascariensis Boisduval, 1847; Rhodogastria madagascariensis; Aganais vitripennis Blanchard, 1849; Amblythyris radama Mabille, 1879

Species of moth

Amerila madagascariensis is a moth of the subfamily Arctiinae. It was described by Jean Baptiste Boisduval in 1847. It is found on Madagascar.
