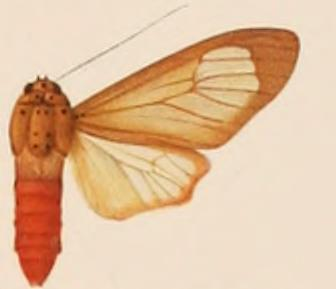

Scientific classification
- Domain: Eukaryota
- Kingdom: Animalia
- Phylum: Arthropoda
- Class: Insecta
- Order: Lepidoptera
- Superfamily: Noctuoidea
- Family: Erebidae
- Subfamily: Arctiinae
- Genus: Amerila
- Species: A. roseomarginata

Binomial name
- Amerila roseomarginata (Rothschild, 1910)

Synonyms
- Rhodogastria roseomarginata Rothschild, 1910

= Amerila roseomarginata =

Species of moth

Amerila roseomarginata is a moth of the subfamily Arctiinae first described by Walter Rothschild in 1910. It is found in Nigeria, Kenya, Zaire, Ivory Coast, Ghana, Benin, Gabon, Kenya, Tanzania and Eritrea.
