= Rhodogastria similis =

Scientific classification
- Domain: Eukaryota
- Kingdom: Animalia
- Phylum: Arthropoda
- Class: Insecta
- Order: Lepidoptera
- Superfamily: Noctuoidea
- Family: Erebidae
- Subfamily: Arctiinae
- Genus: Rhodogastria
- Species: R. similis

Binomial name
- Rhodogastria similis (Möschler, 1884)

Synonyms
- Dionychopus similis Möschler, 1884

Species of moth

Rhodogastria similis is a moth in the family Erebidae. It was described by Heinrich Benno Möschler in 1884. It is found in South Africa and Zimbabwe.

The larvae feed on Pelargonium species and Prunus armeniaca.
