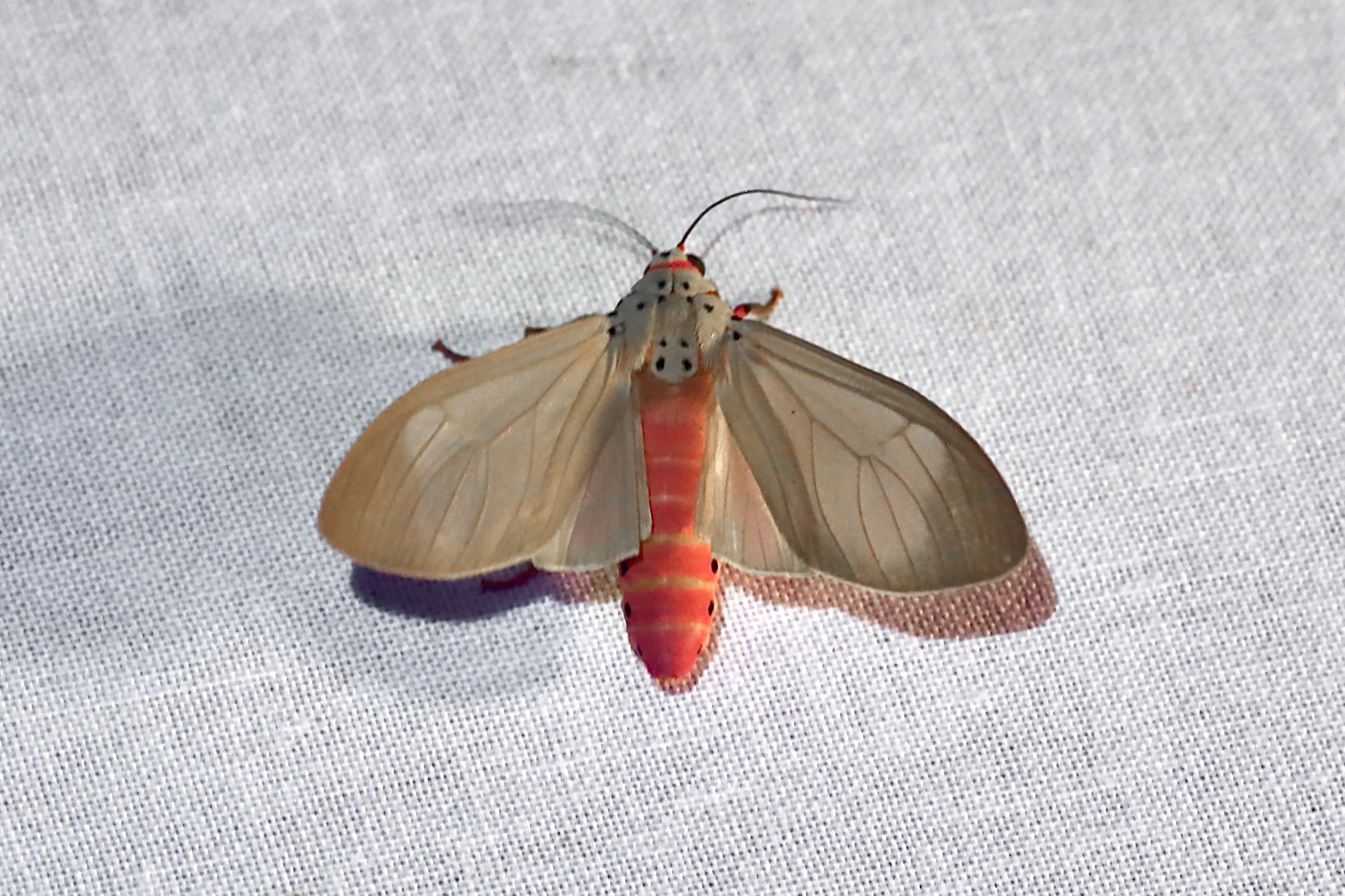
- From Zimbabwe highlands

Scientific classification
- Kingdom: Animalia
- Phylum: Arthropoda
- Clade: Pancrustacea
- Class: Insecta
- Order: Lepidoptera
- Superfamily: Noctuoidea
- Family: Erebidae
- Subfamily: Arctiinae
- Genus: Amerila
- Species: A. makadara

Binomial name
- Amerila makadara Häuser & Boppré, 1997

= Amerila makadara =

Species of moth

Amerila makadara is a species of moth in the subfamily Arctiinae. It was first described in 1997 by Christoph L. Häuser and Michael Boppré. It is found in the Democratic Republic of the Congo, Kenya, Eswatini and Zimbabwe.
