= Amerila mulleri =

Scientific classification
- Domain: Eukaryota
- Kingdom: Animalia
- Phylum: Arthropoda
- Class: Insecta
- Order: Lepidoptera
- Superfamily: Noctuoidea
- Family: Erebidae
- Subfamily: Arctiinae
- Genus: Amerila
- Species: A. mulleri

Binomial name
- Amerila mulleri Häuser & Boppré, 1997

Synonyms
- Rhodogastria alba Muller, 1980 (nomen nudum)

Species of moth

Amerila mulleri is a moth of the subfamily Arctiinae. It was described by Christoph L. Häuser and Michael Boppré in 1997. It is found in the Democratic Republic of the Congo, Kenya, Eswatini and Zimbabwe.

== Comments ==
This species had first been discovered by Simon Muller when examining material from Ditsong National Museum of Natural History in Pretoria and Natural History Museum in London, who had given it the name 'alba' in an unpublished graduation thesis (Muller, 1980: 65). As a valid description of that name had never been published, Häuser and Boppré (1997) took the pleasure to name this species in dedication to its discoverer.
