= Amerila nigrivenosa =

Scientific classification
- Kingdom: Animalia
- Phylum: Arthropoda
- Class: Insecta
- Order: Lepidoptera
- Superfamily: Noctuoidea
- Family: Erebidae
- Subfamily: Arctiinae
- Genus: Amerila
- Species: A. nigrivenosa

Binomial name
- Amerila nigrivenosa (Grünberg, 1910)

Synonyms
- Rhodogastria nigrivenosa Grünberg, 1910

Species of moth

Amerila nigrivenosa is a moth of the subfamily Arctiinae. It was described by Karl Grünberg in 1910. It is found in the Democratic Republic of Congo, Rwanda and Uganda.
