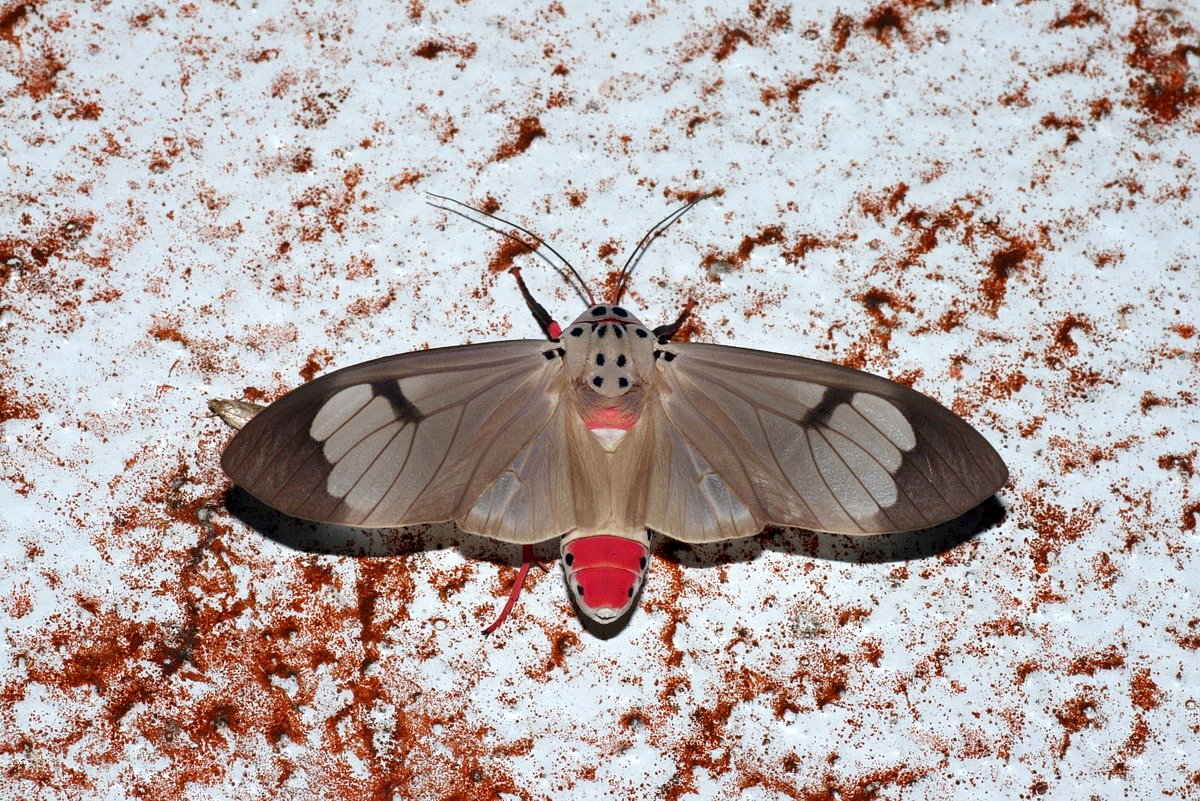

Scientific classification
- Domain: Eukaryota
- Kingdom: Animalia
- Phylum: Arthropoda
- Class: Insecta
- Order: Lepidoptera
- Superfamily: Noctuoidea
- Family: Erebidae
- Subfamily: Arctiinae
- Genus: Amerila
- Species: A. omissa

Binomial name
- Amerila omissa (Rothschild, 1910)

Synonyms
- Rhodogastria omissa Rothschild, 1910

= Amerila omissa =

Species of moth

Amerila omissa is a moth of the subfamily Arctiinae first described by Walter Rothschild in 1910. It is found from the north-eastern parts of the Himalayas, through China and Malaysia to Borneo.

On Mount Kinabalu the species can be found as high as 2600 m above sea level but is mainly found in the lower alpine regions around 1000 m above sea level.
