= Amerila fuscivena =

Scientific classification
- Kingdom: Animalia
- Phylum: Arthropoda
- Clade: Pancrustacea
- Class: Insecta
- Order: Lepidoptera
- Superfamily: Noctuoidea
- Family: Erebidae
- Subfamily: Arctiinae
- Genus: Amerila
- Species: A. fuscivena

Binomial name
- Amerila fuscivena (Hampson, 1916)

Synonyms
- Rhodogastria fuscivena Hampson, 1916

Species of moth

Amerila fuscivena is a moth of the subfamily Arctiinae. It was described by George Hampson in 1916. It is found in Uganda.

The larvae feed on Landolphia species.
