= Amerila kuehni =

Scientific classification
- Domain: Eukaryota
- Kingdom: Animalia
- Phylum: Arthropoda
- Class: Insecta
- Order: Lepidoptera
- Superfamily: Noctuoidea
- Family: Erebidae
- Subfamily: Arctiinae
- Genus: Amerila
- Species: A. kuehni

Binomial name
- Amerila kuehni (Rothschild, 1910)

Synonyms
- Rhodogastria kuehni Rothschild, 1910

Species of moth

Amerila kuehni is a moth of the subfamily Arctiinae. It was described by Walter Rothschild in 1910. It is found on Damar Island in Indonesia.
