= Amerila fumida =

Scientific classification
- Domain: Eukaryota
- Kingdom: Animalia
- Phylum: Arthropoda
- Class: Insecta
- Order: Lepidoptera
- Superfamily: Noctuoidea
- Family: Erebidae
- Subfamily: Arctiinae
- Genus: Amerila
- Species: A. fumida

Binomial name
- Amerila fumida (C. Swinhoe, 1901)

Synonyms
- Rhodogastria fumida C. Swinhoe, 1901; Rhodogastria fumida pallida Rothschild, 1910

Species of moth

Amerila fumida is a moth of the subfamily Arctiinae. It was described by Charles Swinhoe in 1901. It is found in Indonesia (Halmaheira Islands and Timor).
