= Amerila luteibarba =

Scientific classification
- Kingdom: Animalia
- Phylum: Arthropoda
- Class: Insecta
- Order: Lepidoptera
- Superfamily: Noctuoidea
- Family: Erebidae
- Subfamily: Arctiinae
- Genus: Amerila
- Species: A. luteibarba

Binomial name
- Amerila luteibarba (Hampson, 1901)

Synonyms
- Rhodogastria luteibarba Hampson, 1901

Species of moth

Amerila luteibarba is a species of moth of the subfamily Arctiinae. It was described by George Hampson in 1901. It is found in Angola, Benin, Cameroon, the Democratic Republic of the Congo, Gabon, Ghana, Ivory Coast, Kenya, Liberia, Nigeria, Rwanda, Sierra Leone, Tanzania, Togo, and Uganda.
