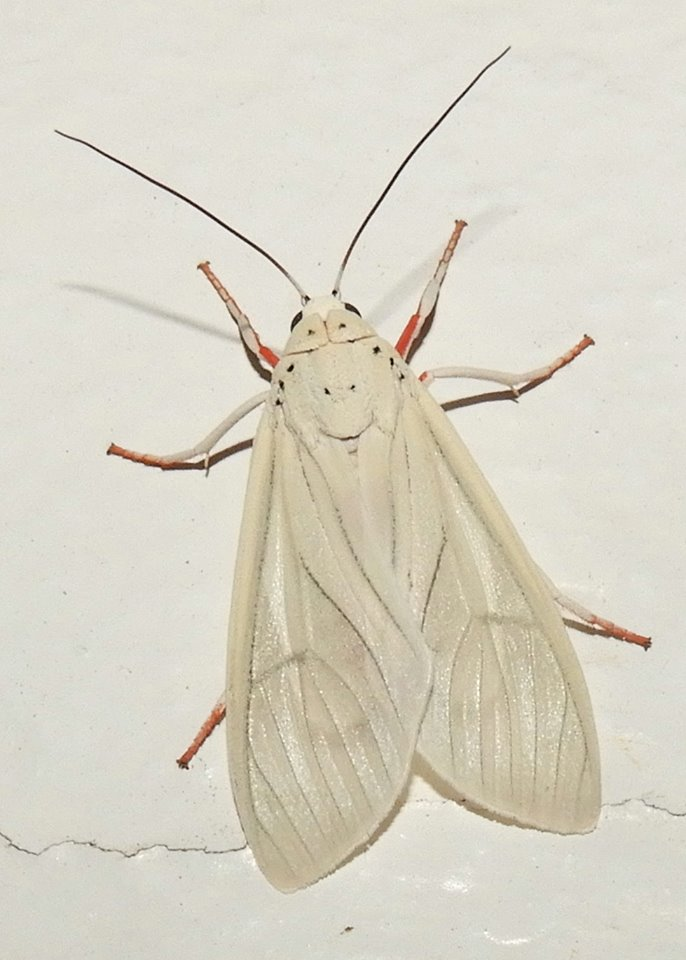

Scientific classification
- Kingdom: Animalia
- Phylum: Arthropoda
- Class: Insecta
- Order: Lepidoptera
- Superfamily: Noctuoidea
- Family: Erebidae
- Subfamily: Arctiinae
- Genus: Amerila
- Species: A. bubo

Binomial name
- Amerila bubo (Walker, 1855)

Synonyms
- Canopus bubo Walker, 1855; Rhodogastria bubo

= Amerila bubo =

Species of moth

Amerila bubo is a moth of the subfamily Arctiinae. It was described by Francis Walker in 1855. It is found in Angola, the Democratic Republic of the Congo, Ethiopia, Kenya, Malawi, Namibia, Rwanda, South Africa, Tanzania, Uganda, Zambia and Zimbabwe.
