= Amerila lineolata =

Scientific classification
- Kingdom: Animalia
- Phylum: Arthropoda
- Class: Insecta
- Order: Lepidoptera
- Superfamily: Noctuoidea
- Family: Erebidae
- Subfamily: Arctiinae
- Genus: Amerila
- Species: A. lineolata

Binomial name
- Amerila lineolata (Kiriakoff, 1954)

Synonyms
- Gastrochrysia lineolata Kiriakoff, 1954; Rhodogastria lineolata

Species of moth

Amerila lineolata is a moth of the subfamily Arctiinae. It was described by Sergius G. Kiriakoff in 1954. It is found in the Democratic Republic of the Congo.
