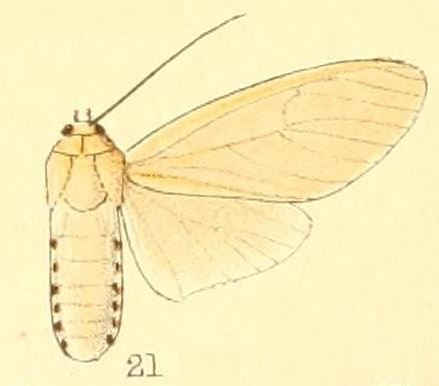

Scientific classification
- Kingdom: Animalia
- Phylum: Arthropoda
- Class: Insecta
- Order: Lepidoptera
- Superfamily: Noctuoidea
- Family: Erebidae
- Subfamily: Arctiinae
- Genus: Amerila
- Species: A. rufifemur

Binomial name
- Amerila rufifemur (Walker, 1855)

Synonyms
- Canopus rufifemur Walker, 1855; Rhodogastria rufifemur

= Amerila rufifemur =

Species of moth

Amerila rufifemur is a moth of the subfamily Arctiinae. It was described by Francis Walker in 1855. It is found in Angola and the Democratic Republic of the Congo.
