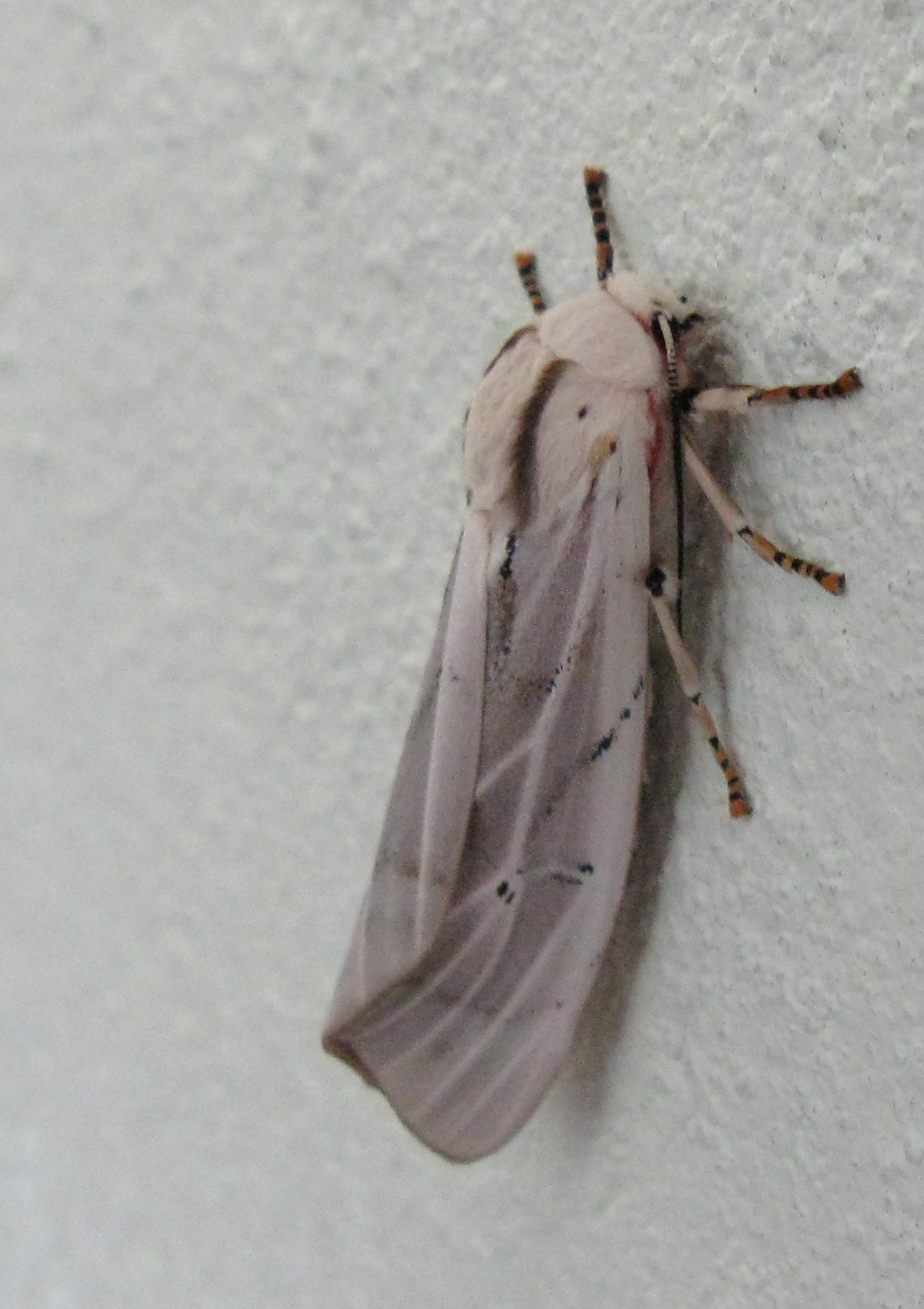

Scientific classification
- Kingdom: Animalia
- Phylum: Arthropoda
- Clade: Pancrustacea
- Class: Insecta
- Order: Lepidoptera
- Superfamily: Noctuoidea
- Family: Erebidae
- Subfamily: Arctiinae
- Subtribe: Spilosomina
- Genus: Rhodogastria; Hübner, [1819]

Type species
- Phalaena amasis Cramer, 1779

Synonyms
- Dionychopus Herrich-Schäffer, [1855]; Munychia Wallengren, 1858

= Rhodogastria =

Genus of moths

Rhodogastria is a genus of moths in the family Erebidae from South Africa. The genus was erected by Jacob Hübner in 1819. Formerly this genus name was mistakenly used for Amerila species.

== Species ==
- Rhodogastria amasis (Cramer, 1779)
- Rhodogastria similis (Möschler, 1884)
