= Amerila thermochroa =

Scientific classification
- Kingdom: Animalia
- Phylum: Arthropoda
- Class: Insecta
- Order: Lepidoptera
- Superfamily: Noctuoidea
- Family: Erebidae
- Subfamily: Arctiinae
- Genus: Amerila
- Species: A. thermochroa

Binomial name
- Amerila thermochroa (Hampson, 1916)

Synonyms
- Rhodogastria thermochroa Hampson, 1916

Species of moth

Amerila thermochroa is a moth of the subfamily Arctiinae. It was described by George Hampson in 1916. It is found in the Democratic Republic of the Congo, Kenya, Rwanda, Tanzania and Uganda.
