= Amerila eugenia =

Scientific classification
- Domain: Eukaryota
- Kingdom: Animalia
- Phylum: Arthropoda
- Class: Insecta
- Order: Lepidoptera
- Superfamily: Noctuoidea
- Family: Erebidae
- Subfamily: Arctiinae
- Genus: Amerila
- Species: A. eugenia

Binomial name
- Amerila eugenia (Fabricius, 1794)

Synonyms
- Noctua eugenia Fabricius, 1794; Rhodogastria eugenia; Rhodogastra fraterna Moore, 1884; Rhodogastria eugenia moorei Rothschild, 1914

Species of moth

Amerila eugenia is a moth of the subfamily Arctiinae. It was described by Johan Christian Fabricius in 1794. It is found in China (eastern Tibet), Pakistan (Karachi), central and southern India and Sri-Lanka.

== Subspecies ==
- Amerila eugenia eugenia (China: Tibet, Pakistan: Karachi, central and southern India)
- Amerila eugenia moorei (Rothschild, 1914)
