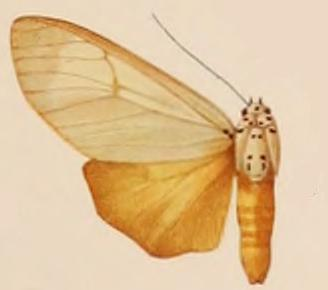

Scientific classification
- Kingdom: Animalia
- Phylum: Arthropoda
- Class: Insecta
- Order: Lepidoptera
- Superfamily: Noctuoidea
- Family: Erebidae
- Subfamily: Arctiinae
- Genus: Amerila
- Species: A. bipartita

Binomial name
- Amerila bipartita (Rothschild, 1910)

Synonyms
- Rhodogastria bipartita Rothschild, 1910

= Amerila bipartita =

Species of moth

Amerila bipartita is a moth of the subfamily Arctiinae. It is found in Tanzania, Kenya, Malawi, Mozambique, Zimbabwe and South Africa.
