= Amerila phaedra =

Scientific classification
- Kingdom: Animalia
- Phylum: Arthropoda
- Class: Insecta
- Order: Lepidoptera
- Superfamily: Noctuoidea
- Family: Erebidae
- Subfamily: Arctiinae
- Genus: Amerila
- Species: A. phaedra

Binomial name
- Amerila phaedra Weymer, 1892

Synonyms
- Rhodogastria phaedra; Rhodogastria subleucoptera Strand, 1911; Rhdogastria orientis Muller, 1980 (nomen nudum)

Species of moth

Amerila phaedra is a moth of the subfamily Arctiinae. It was described by Weymer in 1892. It is found in Kenya, Mozambique, Tanzania and Zimbabwe.
