= Amerila accra =

Scientific classification
- Domain: Eukaryota
- Kingdom: Animalia
- Phylum: Arthropoda
- Class: Insecta
- Order: Lepidoptera
- Superfamily: Noctuoidea
- Family: Erebidae
- Subfamily: Arctiinae
- Genus: Amerila
- Species: A. accra

Binomial name
- Amerila accra (Strand, 1919)

Synonyms
- Rhodogastria metasarca v. accra Strand, 1919

Species of moth

Amerila accra is a moth of the subfamily Arctiinae. It was described by Strand in 1919. It is found in Ghana.
