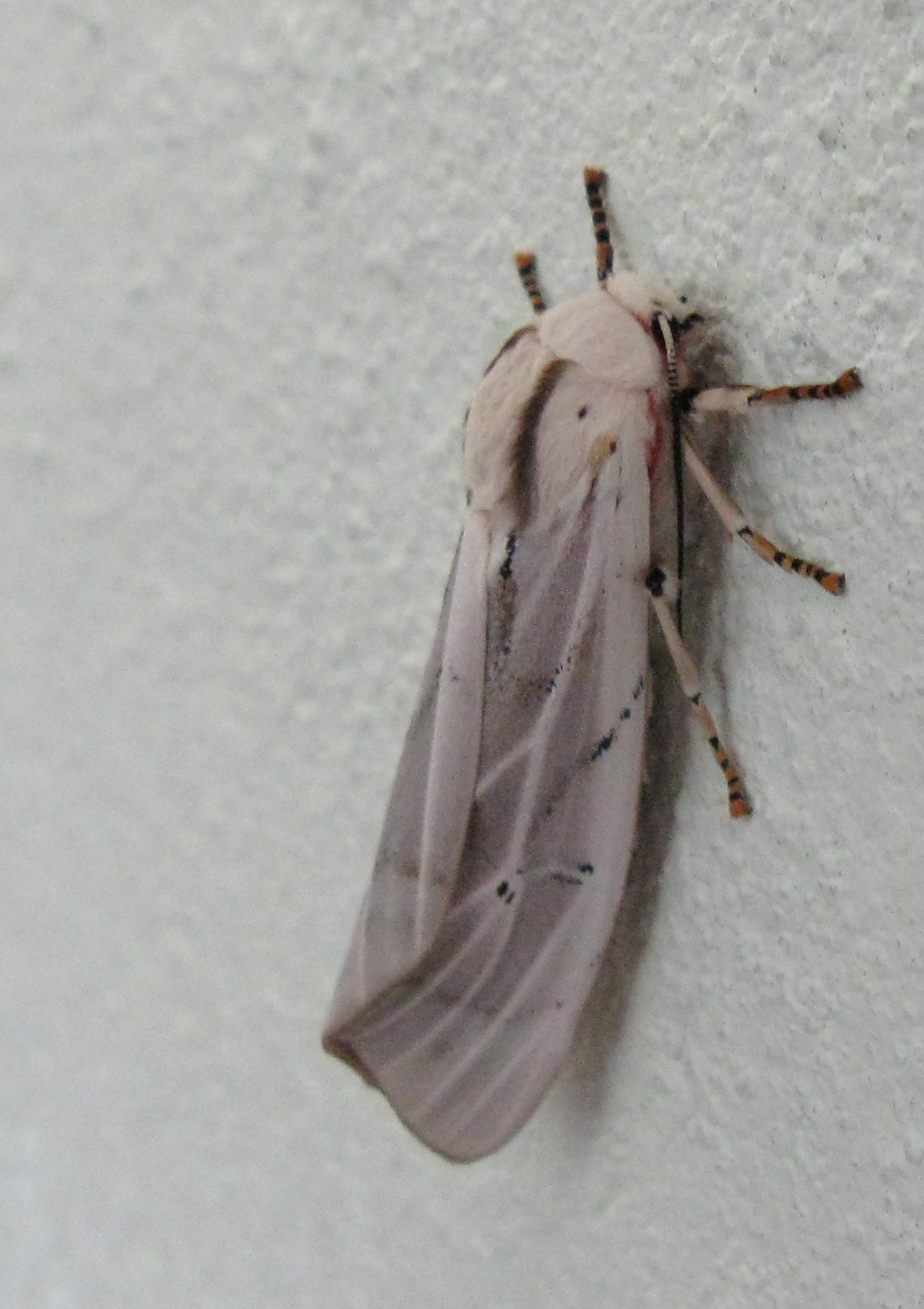

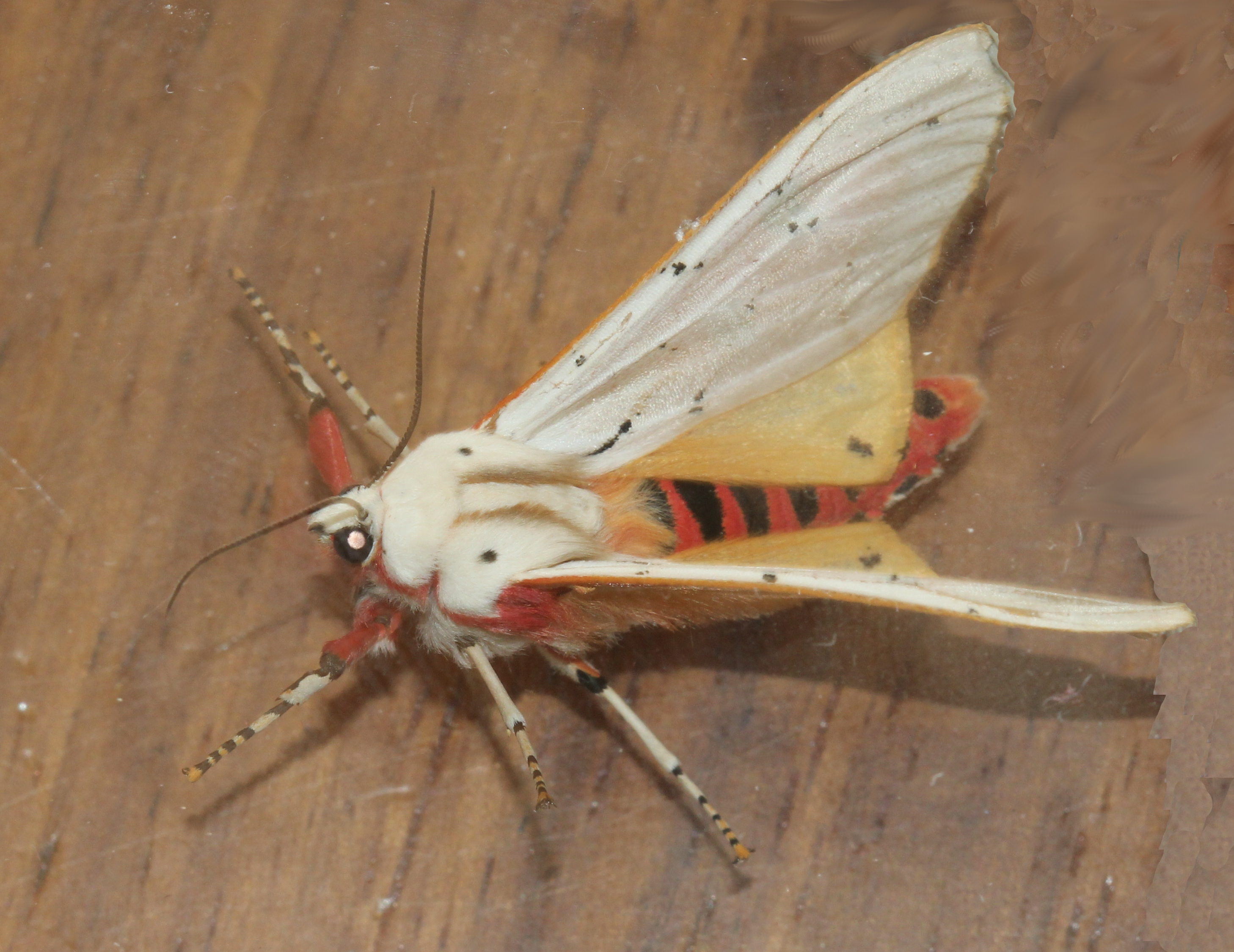

Scientific classification
- Domain: Eukaryota
- Kingdom: Animalia
- Phylum: Arthropoda
- Class: Insecta
- Order: Lepidoptera
- Superfamily: Noctuoidea
- Family: Erebidae
- Subfamily: Arctiinae
- Genus: Rhodogastria
- Species: R. amasis

Binomial name
- Rhodogastria amasis (Cramer, 1779)

Synonyms
- Phalaena amasis Cramer, [1779]; Noctua serici Thunberg, 1781; Chelonia erythronota Boisduval, 1847; Aloa delineata Walker, 1855; Munychia callipyga Wallengren, 1858; Bombyx thunbergii Guérin-Méneville, 1862

= Rhodogastria amasis =

Tri-coloured tiger moth

Species of moth

Rhodogastria amasis, the tri-coloured tiger moth, is a moth in the family Erebidae. It was described by Pieter Cramer in 1779. It is found in Lesotho, Mozambique, South Africa and Zimbabwe.

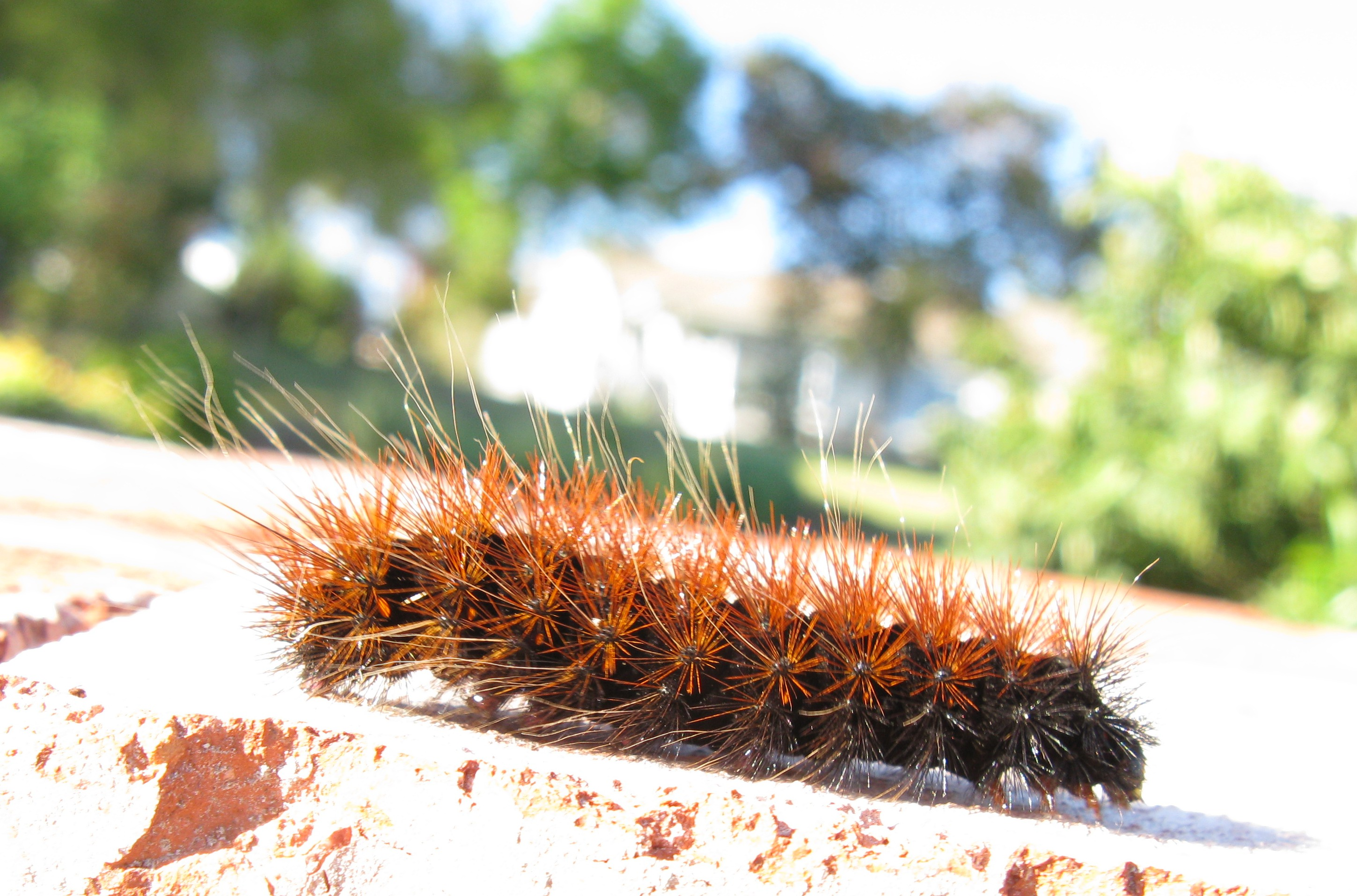
Larva

The larvae feed on Acacia, Calodendrum, Cassia, Cestrum, Clerodendrum, Cotyledon, Passiflora caerulea, Rhus, Senecio, and Tagetes species. Though they are heavily armed with irritant urticating hairs they are readily eaten by fiscal flycatchers and Cape robin-chats that scrub off their hairs against the ground and swallow the larvae whole. Some cuckoos eat the larvae too.
