= Amerila catinca =

Scientific classification
- Domain: Eukaryota
- Kingdom: Animalia
- Phylum: Arthropoda
- Class: Insecta
- Order: Lepidoptera
- Superfamily: Noctuoidea
- Family: Erebidae
- Subfamily: Arctiinae
- Genus: Amerila
- Species: A. catinca

Binomial name
- Amerila catinca Häuser & Boppré, 1997

Species of moth

Amerila catinca is a moth of the subfamily Arctiinae. It was described by Christoph L. Häuser and Michael Boppré in 1997. It is found in Kenya and Tanzania.
