= Amerila rhodopa =

Scientific classification
- Kingdom: Animalia
- Phylum: Arthropoda
- Class: Insecta
- Order: Lepidoptera
- Superfamily: Noctuoidea
- Family: Erebidae
- Subfamily: Arctiinae
- Genus: Amerila
- Species: A. rhodopa

Binomial name
- Amerila rhodopa Walker, 1865

Synonyms
- Rhodogastria rhodopa

Species of moth

Amerila rhodopa is a moth of the subfamily Arctiinae. It was described by Francis Walker in 1865. It is found in India (Sikkim, Nagaland and the southern states).
