= Amerila niveivitrea =

Scientific classification
- Domain: Eukaryota
- Kingdom: Animalia
- Phylum: Arthropoda
- Class: Insecta
- Order: Lepidoptera
- Superfamily: Noctuoidea
- Family: Erebidae
- Subfamily: Arctiinae
- Genus: Amerila
- Species: A. niveivitrea

Binomial name
- Amerila niveivitrea (Bartel, 1903)

Synonyms
- Rhodogastria niveivitrea Bartel, 1903

Species of moth

Amerila niveivitrea is a moth of the subfamily Arctiinae. It was described by Max Bartel in 1903. It is found in Angola, Benin, Burkina Faso, Cameroon, the Democratic Republic of the Congo, Ethiopia, Ghana, Ivory Coast, Kenya, Mali, Nigeria, Tanzania, Togo and Uganda.

The length of the forewings is 26–29 mm.
