= Amerila leucoptera =

Scientific classification
- Kingdom: Animalia
- Phylum: Arthropoda
- Class: Insecta
- Order: Lepidoptera
- Superfamily: Noctuoidea
- Family: Erebidae
- Subfamily: Arctiinae
- Genus: Amerila
- Species: A. leucoptera

Binomial name
- Amerila leucoptera (Hampson, 1901)

Synonyms
- Rhodogastria leucoptera Hampson, 1901; Rhodogastria pannosa Grünberg, 1908; Rhodogastria sarconota Hampson, 1911

Species of moth

Amerila leucoptera is a species of moth of the subfamily Arctiinae. It was described by George Hampson in 1901. It is found in Benin, Cameroon, the Democratic Republic of the Congo, Ghana, Ivory Coast, Nigeria, Senegal, Sierra Leone, Tanzania, Uganda and Zambia.
