= Amerila alberti =

Scientific classification
- Kingdom: Animalia
- Phylum: Arthropoda
- Class: Insecta
- Order: Lepidoptera
- Superfamily: Noctuoidea
- Family: Erebidae
- Subfamily: Arctiinae
- Genus: Amerila
- Species: A. alberti

Binomial name
- Amerila alberti (Rothschild, 1910)

Synonyms
- Rhodogastria alberti Rothschild, 1910; Rhodogastria alberti Rothschild, 1911

Species of moth

Amerila alberti is a moth of the subfamily Arctiinae first described by Walter Rothschild in 1910. It is found in the Australian state of Queensland.

The adults have translucent white wings. They have black spots on the thorax, a red abdomen, and red and orange areas on the legs.
