= Amerila lactea =

Scientific classification
- Domain: Eukaryota
- Kingdom: Animalia
- Phylum: Arthropoda
- Class: Insecta
- Order: Lepidoptera
- Superfamily: Noctuoidea
- Family: Erebidae
- Subfamily: Arctiinae
- Genus: Amerila
- Species: A. lactea

Binomial name
- Amerila lactea (Rothschild, 1910)

Synonyms
- Rhodogastria lactea Rothschild, 1910

Species of moth

Amerila lactea is a moth of the subfamily Arctiinae. It was described by Walter Rothschild in 1910. It is found in Myanmar and Nepal.
