= Amerila vidua =

Scientific classification
- Domain: Eukaryota
- Kingdom: Animalia
- Phylum: Arthropoda
- Class: Insecta
- Order: Lepidoptera
- Superfamily: Noctuoidea
- Family: Erebidae
- Subfamily: Arctiinae
- Genus: Amerila
- Species: A. vidua

Binomial name
- Amerila vidua (Cramer, 1780)

Synonyms
- Phalaena Noctua vidua Cramer, 1780; Rhodogastria vidua; Phalaena Noctua mauritia Stoll, [1781]; Rhodogastria vidua mauritia

Species of moth

Amerila vidua is a moth of the subfamily Arctiinae. It was described by Pieter Cramer in 1780. It is found in Cameroon, Democratic Republic of the Congo, Equatorial Guinea, Ethiopia, Ghana, Guinea, Ivory Coast, Kenya, Mauritius, Nigeria, Sierra Leone and Tanzania.

== Subspecies ==
- Amerila vidua vidua
- Amerila vidua mauritia (Stoll, [1781]) (Mauritius)
