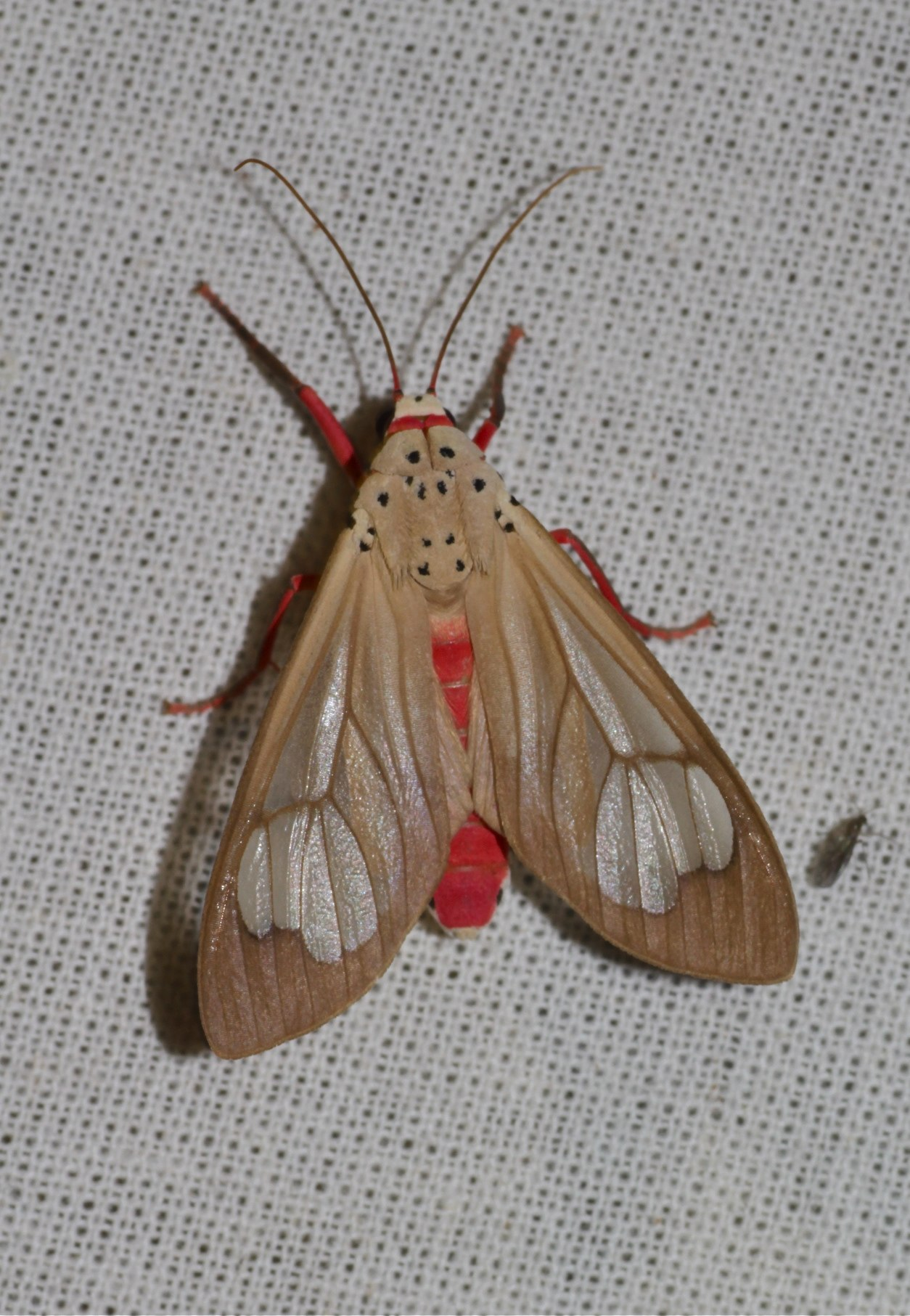

Scientific classification
- Domain: Eukaryota
- Kingdom: Animalia
- Phylum: Arthropoda
- Class: Insecta
- Order: Lepidoptera
- Superfamily: Noctuoidea
- Family: Erebidae
- Subfamily: Arctiinae
- Genus: Amerila
- Species: A. affinis

Binomial name
- Amerila affinis (Rothschild, 1910)

Synonyms
- Rhodogastria affinis Rothschild, 1910; Rhodogastria affinis pallens Bethune-Baker, 1925

= Amerila affinis =

Species of moth

Amerila affinis is a moth of the subfamily Arctiinae. It was described by Rothschild in 1910. It is found in the Democratic Republic of Congo, Ethiopia, Ghana, Kenya, Malawi, Mozambique, South Africa, Tanzania and Zimbabwe.
