= Amerila cinyra =

Scientific classification
- Domain: Eukaryota
- Kingdom: Animalia
- Phylum: Arthropoda
- Class: Insecta
- Order: Lepidoptera
- Superfamily: Noctuoidea
- Family: Erebidae
- Subfamily: Arctiinae
- Genus: Amerila
- Species: A. cinyra

Binomial name
- Amerila cinyra (Muller, 1980)

Synonyms
- Rhodogastria cinyra Muller, 1980

Species of moth

Amerila cinyra is a moth of the subfamily Arctiinae. It was described by Muller in 1980. It is found in Africa.
