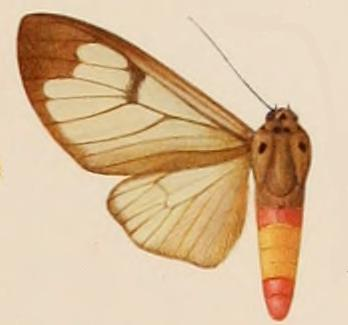

Scientific classification
- Kingdom: Animalia
- Phylum: Arthropoda
- Clade: Pancrustacea
- Class: Insecta
- Order: Lepidoptera
- Superfamily: Noctuoidea
- Family: Erebidae
- Subfamily: Arctiinae
- Genus: Amerila
- Species: A. arthusbertrand

Binomial name
- Amerila arthusbertrand (Guérin-Méneville, 1830)

Synonyms
- Lithosia arthusbrtrand Guérin-Méneville, 1830; Rhodogastria arthusbertrandi (Guérin-Méneville, 1830); Amerila arthusbertrandi (Guérin-Méneville, 1830); Rhodogastria roseibarba Druce, 1901; Chelonia saucia Boisduval, 1832; Creatonotus caudipennis Walker, [1865]

= Amerila arthusbertrand =

Species of moth

Amerila arthusbertrand is a moth of the subfamily Arctiinae first described by Félix Édouard Guérin-Méneville in 1830. It is found on Sulawesi in Indonesia.
