= Amerila nigroapicalis =

Scientific classification
- Domain: Eukaryota
- Kingdom: Animalia
- Phylum: Arthropoda
- Class: Insecta
- Order: Lepidoptera
- Superfamily: Noctuoidea
- Family: Erebidae
- Subfamily: Arctiinae
- Genus: Amerila
- Species: A. nigroapicalis

Binomial name
- Amerila nigroapicalis (Aurivillius, 1900)

Synonyms
- Pelochyta nigroapicalis Aurivillius, 1899 [1900]; Rhodogastria nigroapicalis

Species of moth

Amerila nigroapicalis is a moth of the subfamily Arctiinae. It was described by Per Olof Christopher Aurivillius in 1900 and is found in Cameroon, the Democratic Republic of the Congo, Equatorial Guinea and Nigeria.
