= Amerila simillima =

Scientific classification
- Domain: Eukaryota
- Kingdom: Animalia
- Phylum: Arthropoda
- Class: Insecta
- Order: Lepidoptera
- Superfamily: Noctuoidea
- Family: Erebidae
- Subfamily: Arctiinae
- Genus: Amerila
- Species: A. simillima

Binomial name
- Amerila simillima (Rothschild, 1917)

Synonyms
- Rhodogastria simillima Rothschild, 1917

Species of moth

Amerila simillima is a moth of the subfamily Arctiinae. It was described by Walter Rothschild in 1917. It is found in Australia.
