= Amerila brunnea =

Scientific classification
- Kingdom: Animalia
- Phylum: Arthropoda
- Class: Insecta
- Order: Lepidoptera
- Superfamily: Noctuoidea
- Family: Erebidae
- Subfamily: Arctiinae
- Genus: Amerila
- Species: A. brunnea

Binomial name
- Amerila brunnea (Hampson, 1901)

Synonyms
- Rhodogastria brunnea Hampson, 1901; Rhodogastria subvitrea Bartel, 1903

Species of moth

Amerila brunnea is a moth of the subfamily Arctiinae. It was described by George Hampson in 1901. It is found in Angola, Benin, Cameroon, the Democratic Republic of the Congo, Gabon, Ghana, Ivory Coast, Kenya, Liberia, Mozambique, Nigeria, Sierra Leone, Tanzania, Togo, Uganda and Zimbabwe.

== Description ==
=== Male ===
The male length is between 24 and 26 millimetres (0.94 and 1.02 in) long. It is dark grayish brown and basally slightly paler. The area between the radius and the veins is transparent. The veins are finely lined with dark scales. The discal vein has a much broader dark streak. It is dark grayish brown at the apex and along the outer margin. The central area is also partly transparent. The inner margin has a pale yellowish fringe and long androconial scales along the outer margin near the anal angle. The head, thorax, and the outer sides of the legs are pale to dark grayish brown. The inner sides of the femora and the tibiae are yellow. The tegulae has a black spot. The abdomen is either bright yellow or pale yellowish gray.

The uncus is very short, small, and triangular with a small, narrow tip. The valvae is large, oval-shaped, and rounded with long, tube-shaped coremata. There are two areas of many small, parallel cornuti and a larger area with two larger, and many more smaller cornuti.

=== Female ===
Overall much paler, with the pattern in males included. It doesn't have long hair-like scales like the males. The abdomen is either pale yellow or whitish gray.

== Subspecies ==
- Amerila brunnea brunnea
- Amerila brunnea bipartitoides Häuser & Boppre, 1997 (Kenya, Mozambique, Tanzania, Zimbabwe)
