= Amerila femina =

Scientific classification
- Kingdom: Animalia
- Phylum: Arthropoda
- Class: Insecta
- Order: Lepidoptera
- Superfamily: Noctuoidea
- Family: Erebidae
- Subfamily: Arctiinae
- Genus: Amerila
- Species: A. femina

Binomial name
- Amerila femina (Berio, 1935)

Synonyms
- Rhodogastria femina Berio, 1935

Species of moth

Amerila femina is a moth of the subfamily Arctiinae. It was described by Emilio Berio in 1935 and is found in Cameroon.
