= Amerila piepersii =

Scientific classification
- Kingdom: Animalia
- Phylum: Arthropoda
- Class: Insecta
- Order: Lepidoptera
- Superfamily: Noctuoidea
- Family: Erebidae
- Subfamily: Arctiinae
- Genus: Amerila
- Species: A. piepersii

Binomial name
- Amerila piepersii Snellen, 1879

Synonyms
- Rhodogastria piepersii; Amerila piepersi

Species of moth

Amerila piepersii is a moth of the subfamily Arctiinae. It was described by Snellen in 1879. It is found in Indonesia (Sulawesi, Buton, Sula, Mongolei).
