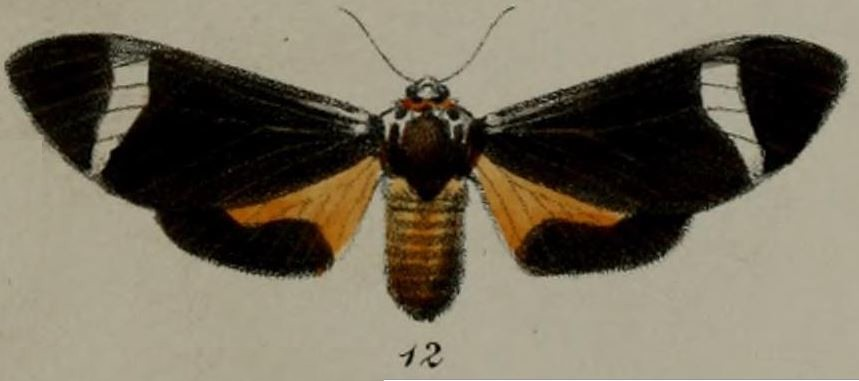

Scientific classification
- Kingdom: Animalia
- Phylum: Arthropoda
- Class: Insecta
- Order: Lepidoptera
- Superfamily: Noctuoidea
- Family: Erebidae
- Subfamily: Arctiinae
- Genus: Amerila
- Species: A. syntomina

Binomial name
- Amerila syntomina (Butler, 1878)

Synonyms
- Caryatis syntomina Butler, 1878; Anace herpa Druce, 1887

= Amerila syntomina =

Species of moth

Amerila syntomina is a moth of the subfamily Arctiinae. It was described by Arthur Gardiner Butler in 1878. It is found in Benin, Cameroon, the Democratic Republic of the Congo, Ghana, Guinea, Ivory Coast, Nigeria, Sierra Leone and Tanzania.

== Subspecies ==
- Amerila syntomina syntomina
- Amerila syntomina rubondoi Häuser & Boppre, 1997 (Tanzania)
