= Amerila lucida =

Scientific classification
- Domain: Eukaryota
- Kingdom: Animalia
- Phylum: Arthropoda
- Class: Insecta
- Order: Lepidoptera
- Superfamily: Noctuoidea
- Family: Erebidae
- Subfamily: Arctiinae
- Genus: Amerila
- Species: A. lucida

Binomial name
- Amerila lucida (Muller, 1980)

Synonyms
- Rhodogastria lucida Muller, 1980

Species of moth

Amerila lucida is a nomen nudum moth taxon of the subfamily Arctiinae. It was described from Africa by Muller in 1980.
