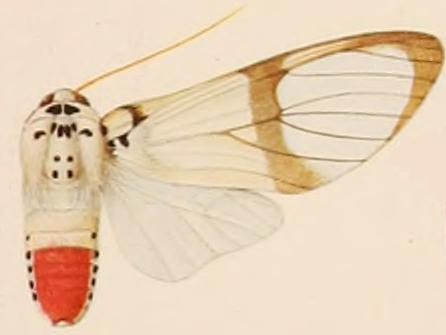

Scientific classification
- Domain: Eukaryota
- Kingdom: Animalia
- Phylum: Arthropoda
- Class: Insecta
- Order: Lepidoptera
- Superfamily: Noctuoidea
- Family: Erebidae
- Subfamily: Arctiinae
- Genus: Amerila
- Species: A. magnifica

Binomial name
- Amerila magnifica (Rothschild, 1910)

Synonyms
- Rhodogastria magnifica Rothschild, 1910

= Amerila magnifica =

Species of moth

Amerila magnifica is a moth of the subfamily Arctiinae first described by Walter Rothschild in 1910. It is found in Kenya, Mozambique and South Africa.
