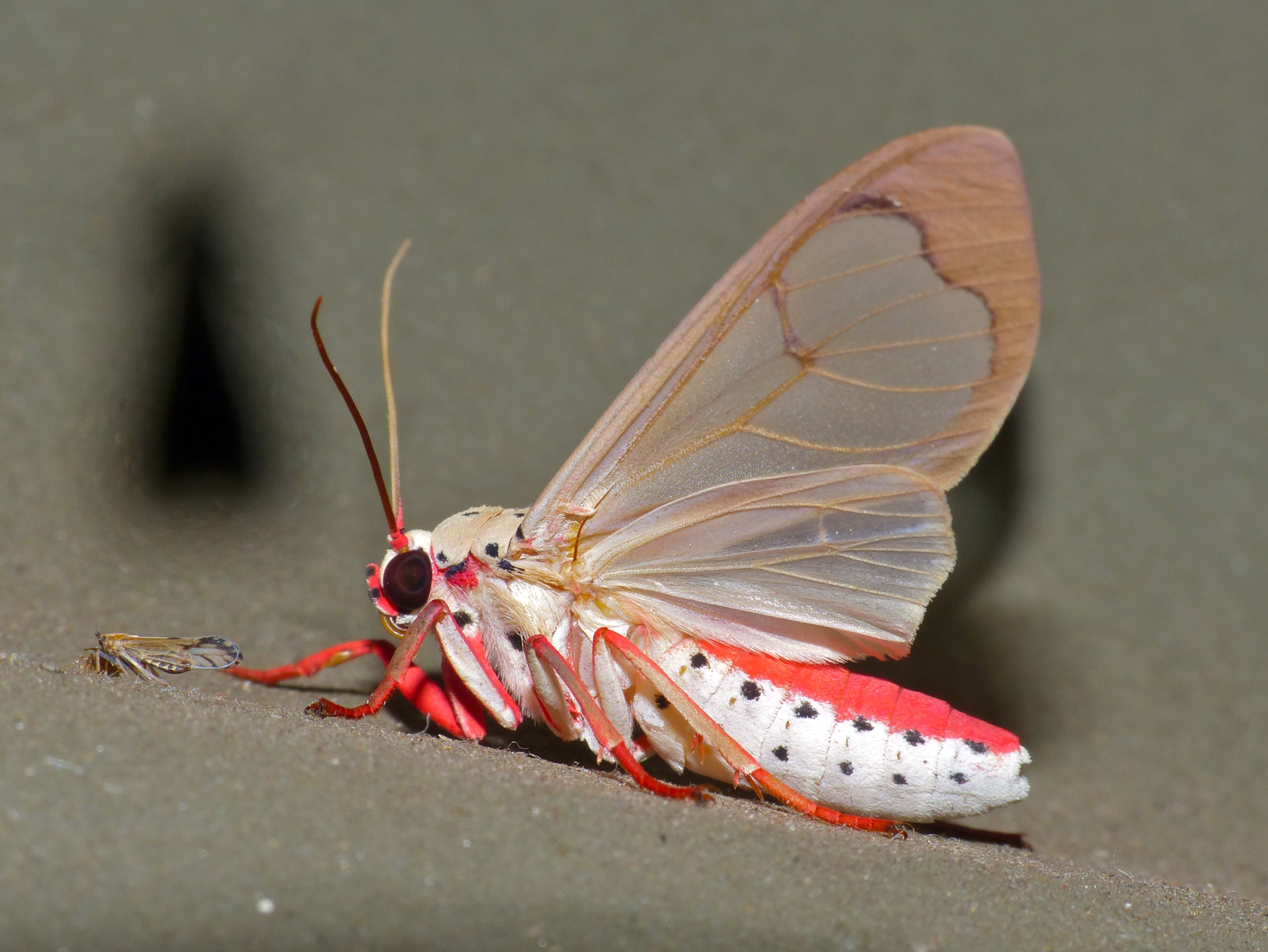

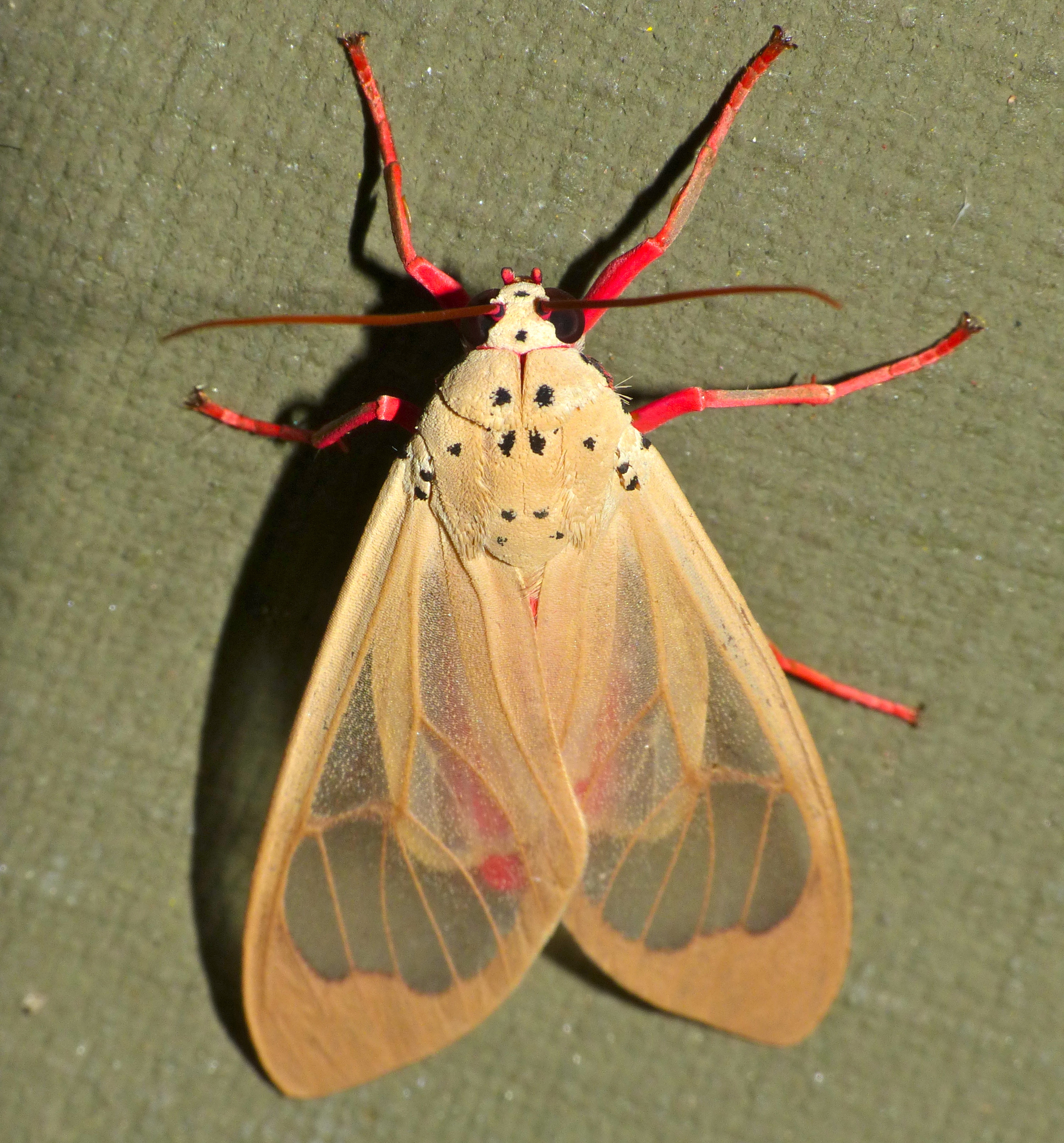

Scientific classification
- Kingdom: Animalia
- Phylum: Arthropoda
- Clade: Pancrustacea
- Class: Insecta
- Order: Lepidoptera
- Superfamily: Noctuoidea
- Family: Erebidae
- Subfamily: Arctiinae
- Genus: Amerila
- Species: A. bauri

Binomial name
- Amerila bauri Möschler, 1884

Synonyms
- Rhodogastria bauri

= Amerila bauri =

Species of moth

Amerila bauri is a moth of the subfamily Arctiinae. It was described by Heinrich Benno Möschler in 1884. It is found in Mozambique, Namibia, South Africa and Zimbabwe.

The larvae feed on Eugenia species and Syzygium cordatum.

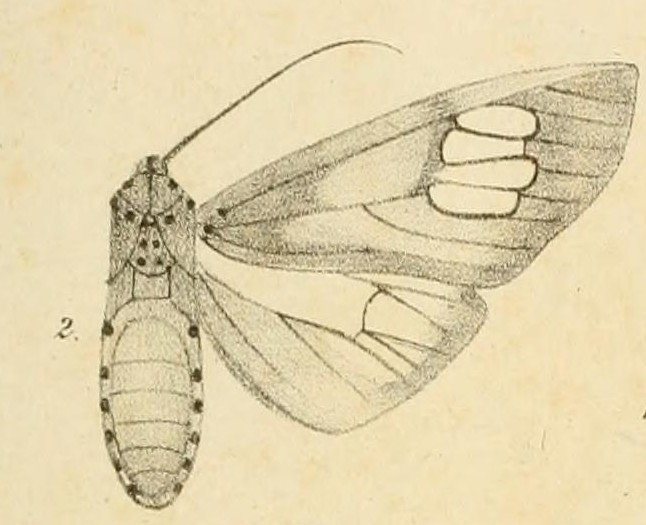
Amerila bauri
