= Amerila castanea =

Scientific classification
- Kingdom: Animalia
- Phylum: Arthropoda
- Class: Insecta
- Order: Lepidoptera
- Superfamily: Noctuoidea
- Family: Erebidae
- Subfamily: Arctiinae
- Genus: Amerila
- Species: A. castanea

Binomial name
- Amerila castanea (Hampson, 1911)

Synonyms
- Rhodogastria castanea Hampson, 1911

Species of moth

Amerila castanea is a moth of the subfamily Arctiinae. It was described by George Hampson in 1911. It is found in Nigeria.
