= Amerila timolis =

Timolis' frother

Scientific classification
- Domain: Eukaryota
- Kingdom: Animalia
- Phylum: Arthropoda
- Class: Insecta
- Order: Lepidoptera
- Superfamily: Noctuoidea
- Family: Erebidae
- Subfamily: Arctiinae
- Genus: Amerila
- Species: A. timolis

Binomial name
- Amerila timolis (Rothschild, 1914)

Synonyms
- Rhodogastria timolis Rothschild, 1914; Rhodogastria timiolis Turner, 1915; Rhodogastria timolis papuana Rothschild, 1914; Amerila timolis tenebrosa; Rhodogastria timolis tenebrosa Rothschild, 1916

Species of moth

Amerila timolis, or Timolis' frother, is a moth of the subfamily Arctiinae. It was described by Walter Rothschild in 1914. It is found in New Guinea and Queensland, Australia.

== Subspecies ==
- Amerila timolis timolis (Australia: Queensland)
- Amerila timolis papuana (Rothschild, 1914) (Papua New Guinea, Vulcan Island: Manam)
