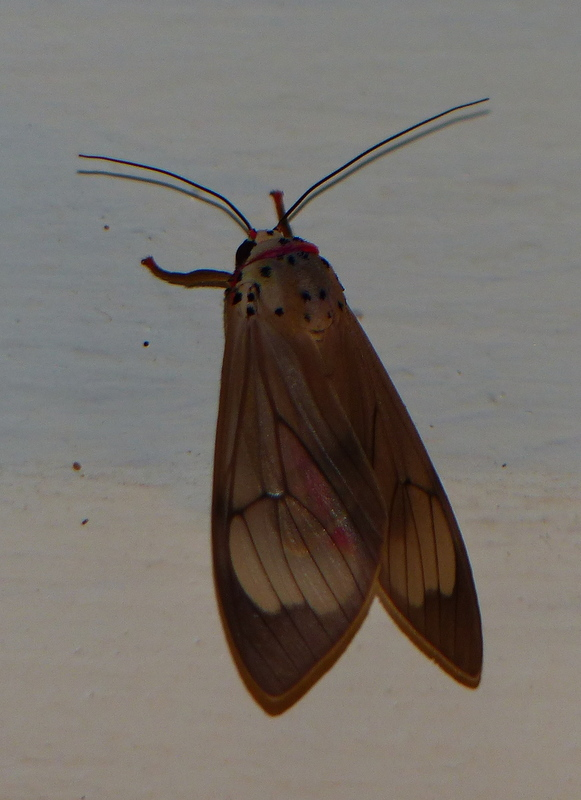

Scientific classification
- Kingdom: Animalia
- Phylum: Arthropoda
- Class: Insecta
- Order: Lepidoptera
- Superfamily: Noctuoidea
- Family: Erebidae
- Subfamily: Arctiinae
- Genus: Amerila
- Species: A. vitrea

Binomial name
- Amerila vitrea Plötz, 1880

Synonyms
- Rhodogastria vitrea; Pelochyta vidua Saalmüller, 1884 (nec Cramer, 1779); Rhodogastria saalmuelleri Rothschild, 1911

= Amerila vitrea =

Species of moth

Amerila vitrea is a species of moth of the subfamily Arctiinae. It was described by Carl Plötz in 1880. It is found in Angola, Benin, Burkina Faso, Cameroon, the Republic of the Congo, The Democratic Republic of the Congo, Eritrea, the Gambia, Ghana, Ivory Coast, Kenya, Liberia, Madagascar, Mozambique, Namibia, Nigeria, Rwanda, Senegal, Sierra Leone, Somalia, South Africa, Sudan, Tanzania, Uganda, Zambia and Zimbabwe.

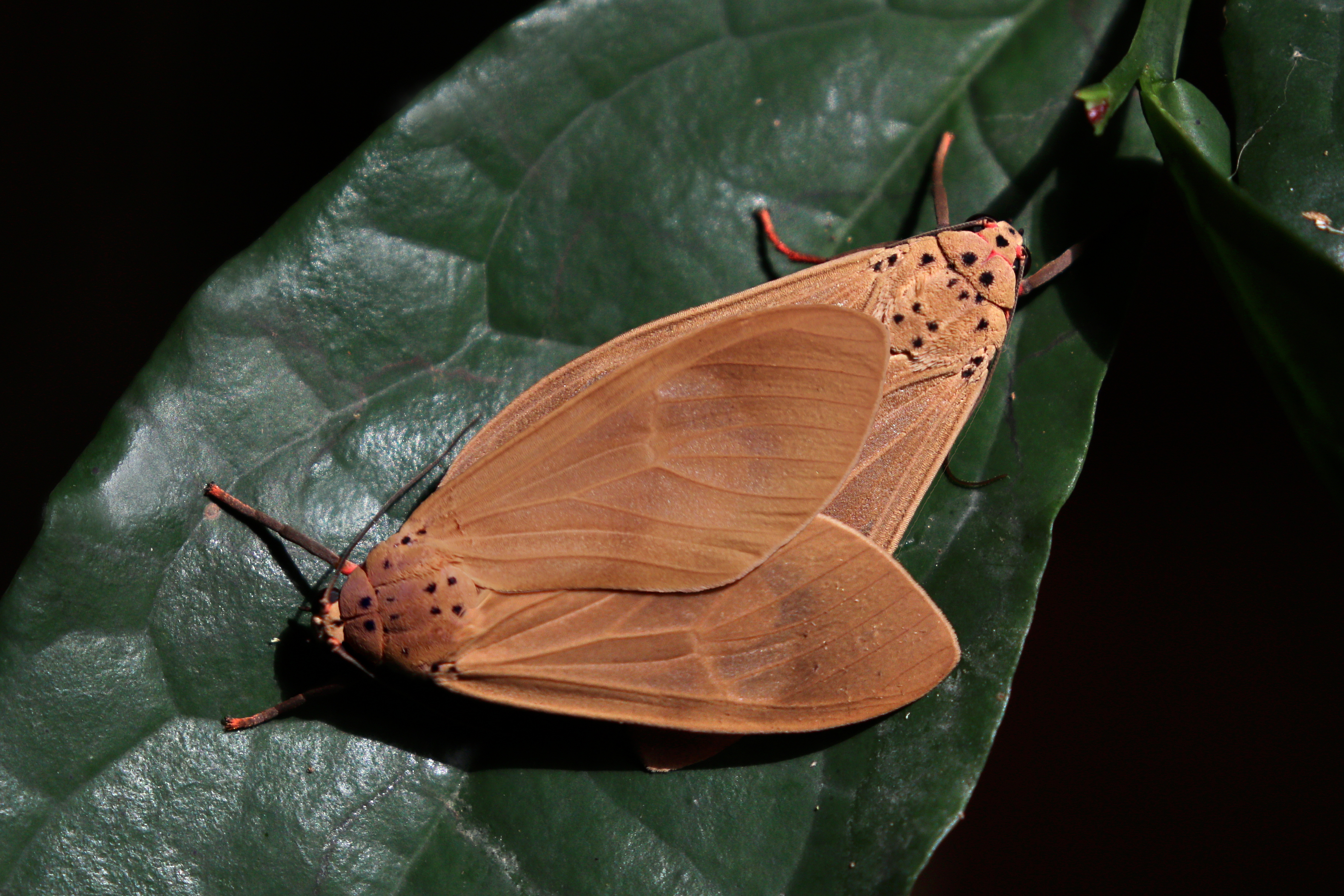
mating, Ghana

== Subspecies ==
- Amerila vitrea vitrea
- Amerila vitrea saalmuelleri (Rothschild, 1911) (the Comoros and Madagascar)
