= Amerila abdominalis =

Scientific classification
- Domain: Eukaryota
- Kingdom: Animalia
- Phylum: Arthropoda
- Class: Insecta
- Order: Lepidoptera
- Superfamily: Noctuoidea
- Family: Erebidae
- Subfamily: Arctiinae
- Genus: Amerila
- Species: A. abdominalis

Binomial name
- Amerila abdominalis (Rothschild, 1933)

Synonyms
- Rhodogastria abdominalis Rothschild, 1933

Species of moth

Amerila abdominalis is a moth of the subfamily Arctiinae. It was described by Walter Rothschild in 1933. It is found in Indonesia and Malaysia.
