= Amerila aldabrensis =

Scientific classification
- Domain: Eukaryota
- Kingdom: Animalia
- Phylum: Arthropoda
- Class: Insecta
- Order: Lepidoptera
- Superfamily: Noctuoidea
- Family: Erebidae
- Subfamily: Arctiinae
- Genus: Amerila
- Species: A. aldabrensis

Binomial name
- Amerila aldabrensis (Fryer, 1912)

Synonyms
- Rhodogastria aldabrensis Fryer, 1912

Species of moth

Amerila aldabrensis is a moth of the subfamily Arctiinae. It was described by John Fryer in 1912. It is found in the Seychelles.
