= Amerila lupia =

Scientific classification
- Kingdom: Animalia
- Phylum: Arthropoda
- Clade: Pancrustacea
- Class: Insecta
- Order: Lepidoptera
- Superfamily: Noctuoidea
- Family: Erebidae
- Subfamily: Arctiinae
- Genus: Amerila
- Species: A. lupia

Binomial name
- Amerila lupia (H. Druce, 1887)

Synonyms
- Pelochyta lupia H. Druce, 1887; Rhodogastria lupia; Amerila nivaria Weymer, 1892; Rhodogastria sanguinota Strand, 1911

Species of moth

Amerila lupia is a moth of the subfamily Arctiinae. It was described by Herbert Druce in 1887. It is found in Kenya, Mozambique, South Africa, Tanzania, Zambia and Zimbabwe.
