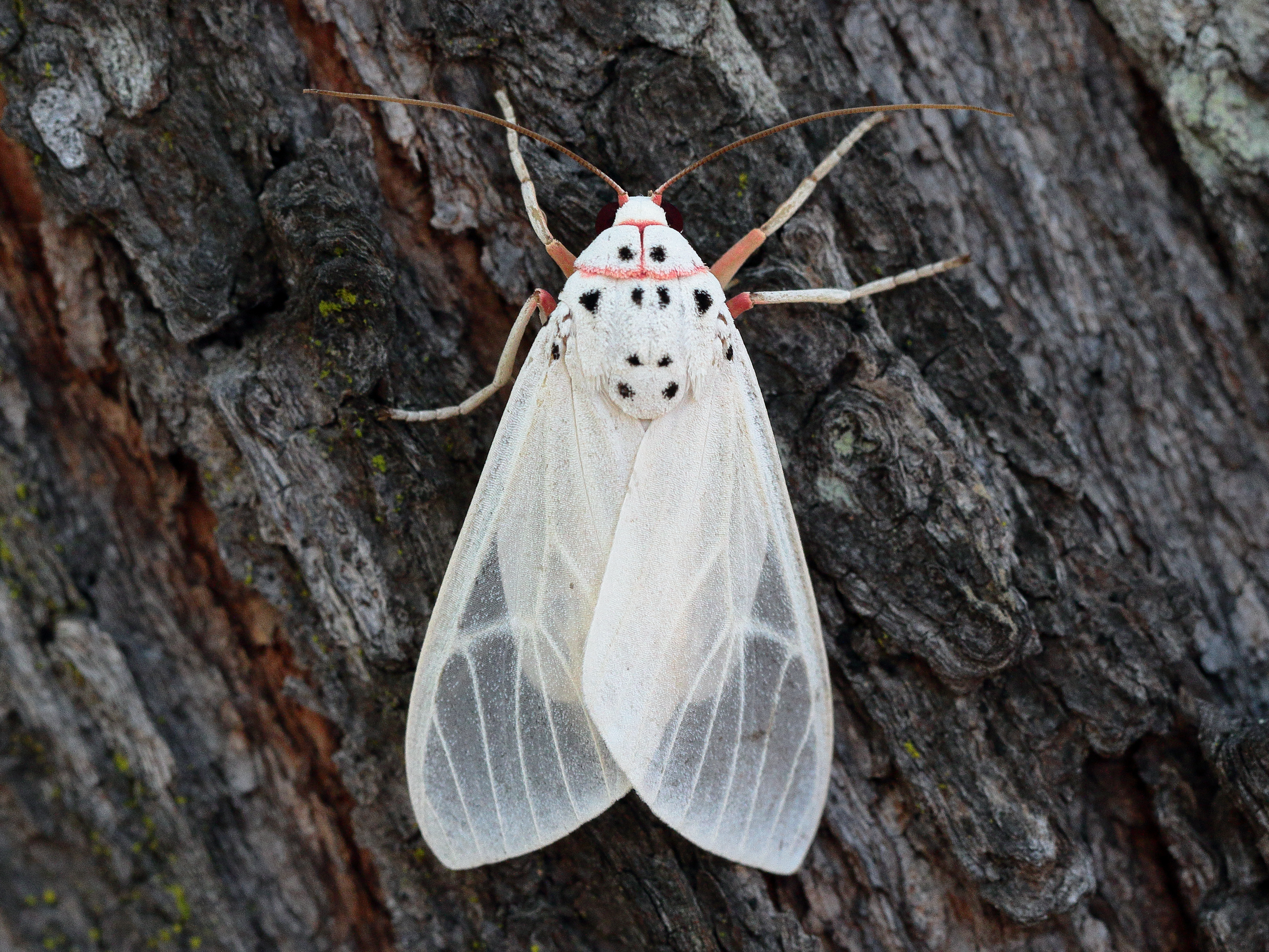
- Gibbs Creek, North Queensland

Scientific classification
- Kingdom: Animalia
- Phylum: Arthropoda
- Class: Insecta
- Order: Lepidoptera
- Superfamily: Noctuoidea
- Family: Erebidae
- Subfamily: Arctiinae
- Genus: Amerila
- Species: A. rubripes

Binomial name
- Amerila rubripes Walker, [1865]

= Amerila rubripes =

Walker's frother

Species of moth

Amerila rubripes, Walker's frother, is a moth of the subfamily Arctiinae. It is found in Queensland.

The wingspan is about 50 mm. Adults have translucent white wings. They have black spots on the thorax, and red and orange areas on the legs, hindwings and body. When disturbed, the moth exudes a froth from glands beside the eyes.

The larvae feed on Cryptostegia grandiflora and Gymnanthera oblonga.
