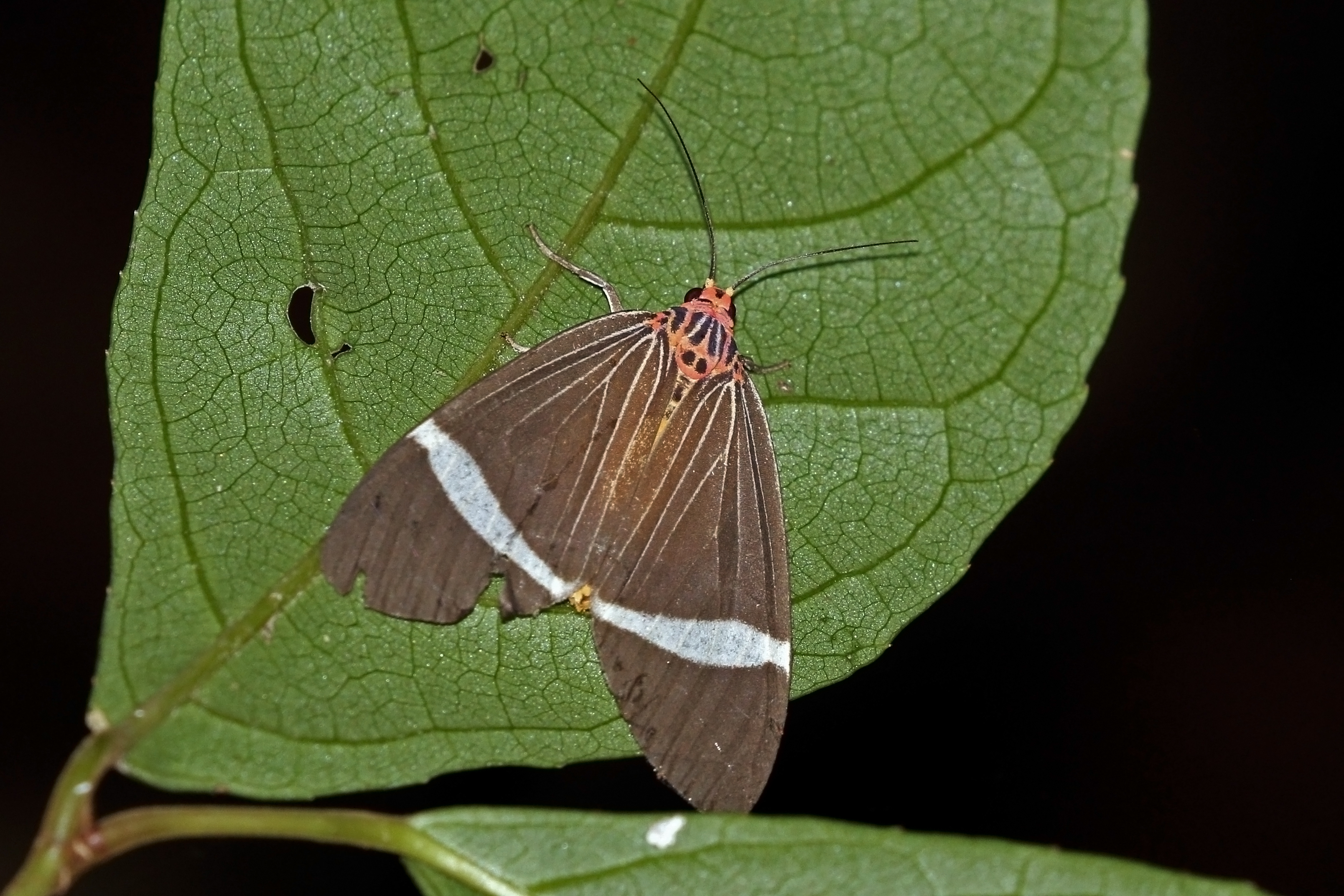
- C. phileta, Ghana

Scientific classification
- Domain: Eukaryota
- Kingdom: Animalia
- Phylum: Arthropoda
- Class: Insecta
- Order: Lepidoptera
- Superfamily: Noctuoidea
- Family: Erebidae
- Subfamily: Arctiinae
- Subtribe: Nyctemerina
- Genus: Caryatis; Hübner, 1819

Synonyms
- Asotomorpha Hulstaert, 1923; Euthoracia Hulstaert, 1923

= Caryatis (moth) =

Genus of moths

Caryatis is a genus of tiger moths in the family Erebidae.

== Species ==
- Caryatis hersilia Druce, 1887
- Caryatis phileta (Drury, 1782)
- Caryatis stenoperas Hampson, 1910

== Taxonomy ==
Caryatis was previously treated as a junior synonym of Amerila.
