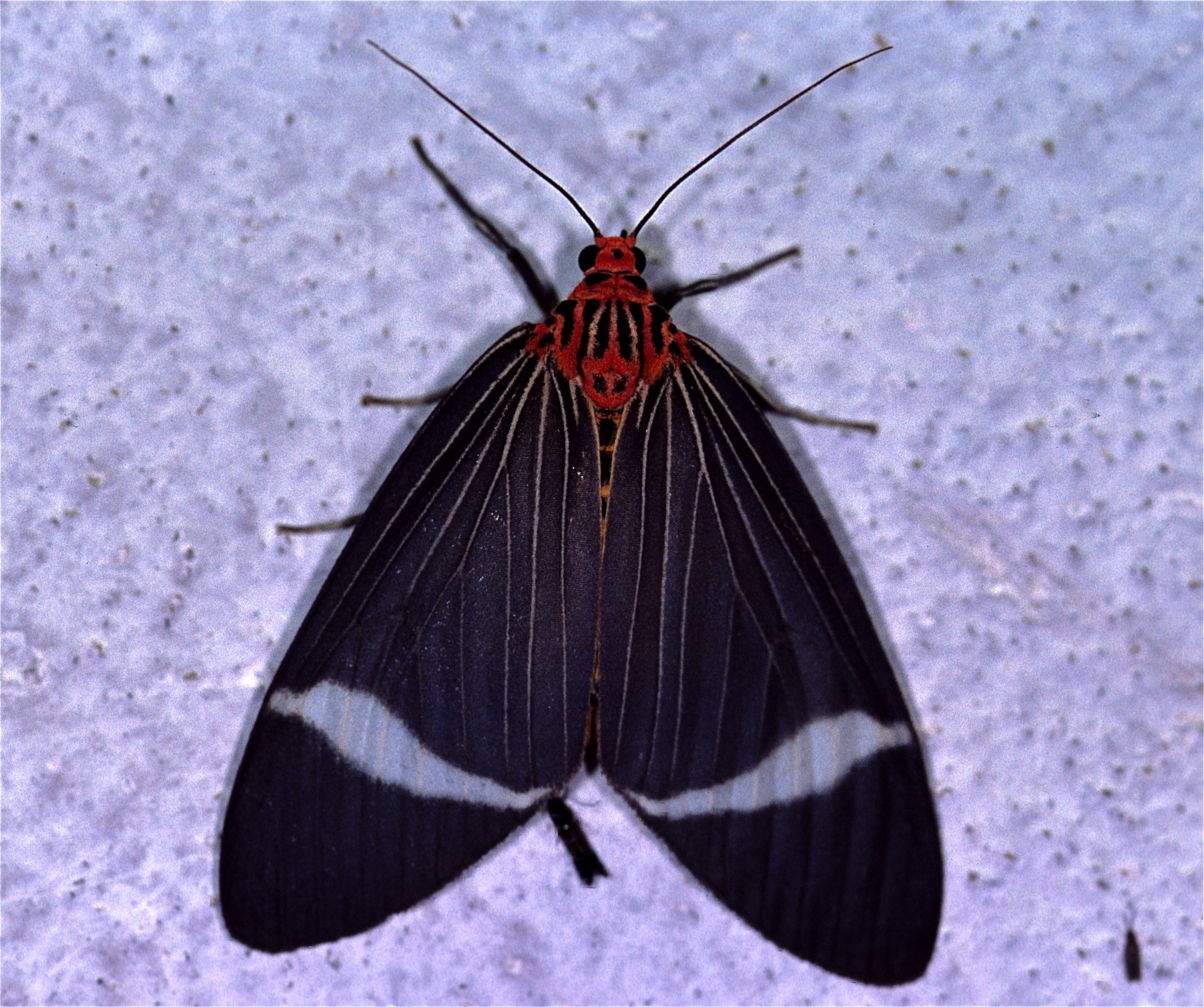

Scientific classification
- Kingdom: Animalia
- Phylum: Arthropoda
- Class: Insecta
- Order: Lepidoptera
- Superfamily: Noctuoidea
- Family: Erebidae
- Subfamily: Arctiinae
- Genus: Caryatis
- Species: C. hersilia

Binomial name
- Caryatis hersilia H. Druce, 1887

= Caryatis hersilia =

Species of moth

Caryatis hersilia is a moth of the subfamily Arctiinae. It was described by Herbert Druce in 1887. It is found in Cameroon, Nigeria and South Africa.
