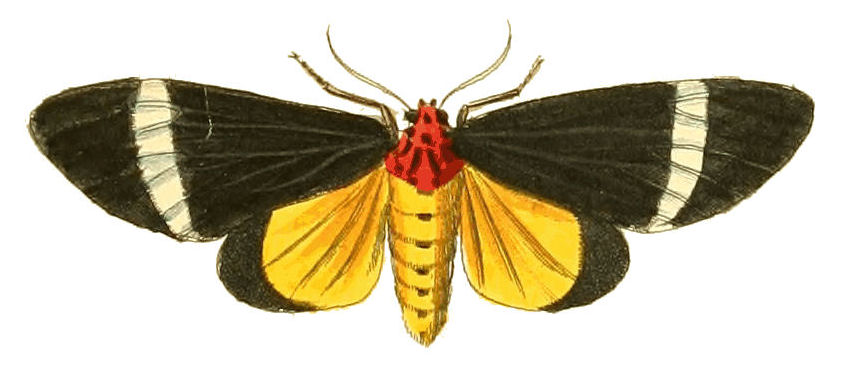
- Illustration by Dru Drury

Scientific classification
- Kingdom: Animalia
- Phylum: Arthropoda
- Class: Insecta
- Order: Lepidoptera
- Superfamily: Noctuoidea
- Family: Erebidae
- Subfamily: Arctiinae
- Genus: Caryatis
- Species: C. phileta

Binomial name
- Caryatis phileta (Drury, 1782)

Synonyms
- Phalaena phileta Drury, 1782

= Caryatis phileta =

Species of moth

Caryatis phileta is a moth of the subfamily Arctiinae. It was described by Dru Drury in 1782. It is found in Cameroon, the Democratic Republic of the Congo, Gabon, Ghana, Nigeria and Sierra Leone.

== Description ==
The moth's antennae are black and setaceous. Its thorax is red, spotted, and striped with black. Its abdomen is yellow, with black streaks crossing it. The anterior wings are sooty black, with a white band crossing each from the anterior edges to the lower corners. Their posterior wings are yellow, with a black border running along the external edges.

Underside: Head and neck red. Legs streaked black and white. Breast and abdomen yellow, the latter spotted with black on each side. Wings coloured as on the upperside. Margins of the wings entire. Wingspan 2 1/4 inches (57 mm).
