= Caryatis stenoperas =

Scientific classification
- Kingdom: Animalia
- Phylum: Arthropoda
- Class: Insecta
- Order: Lepidoptera
- Superfamily: Noctuoidea
- Family: Erebidae
- Subfamily: Arctiinae
- Genus: Caryatis
- Species: C. stenoperas

Binomial name
- Caryatis stenoperas Hampson, 1910

Species of moth

Caryatis stenoperas is a moth of the subfamily Arctiinae. It was described by George Hampson in 1910. It is found in the Democratic Republic of the Congo and Uganda.
