= Dubatolovia =

Scientific classification
- Kingdom: Animalia
- Phylum: Arthropoda
- Clade: Pancrustacea
- Class: Insecta
- Order: Lepidoptera
- Superfamily: Noctuoidea
- Family: Erebidae
- Subfamily: Arctiinae
- Genus: Dubatolovia de Freina, 2010
- Species: D. atrivena

Binomial name
- Dubatolovia atrivena (Hampson, 1907)

Synonyms
- Amerila atrivena Hampson, 1907; Rhodogastria atrivena; Creatonotos neurophaea Hampson, 1911

Genus of moths

Dubatolovia is a monotypic genus of tiger moths in the family Erebidae. The genus includes only one species, Dubatolovia atrivena, which is found in western Africa (including Ghana), Cameroon, the Central African Republic, Zaire, Rwanda, Uganda and Angola.

The larvae feed on Erythroxylum coca, Chlorophoroa excelsa, Phytolacca dodecandra, Maeopsis eminii, Grewia mollis and Trema guineensis.
