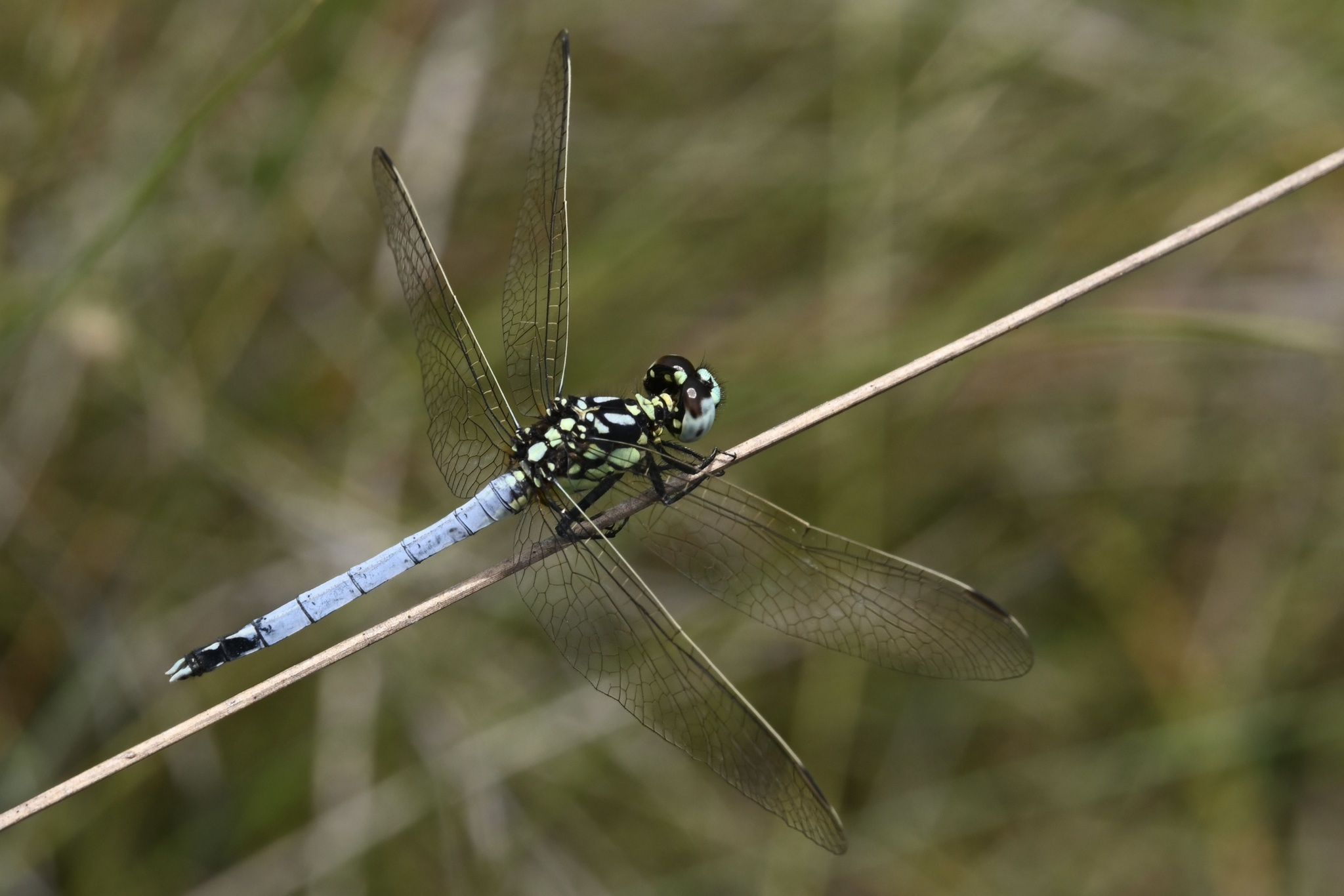
- P. risi (Angola)

Scientific classification
- Kingdom: Animalia
- Phylum: Arthropoda
- Class: Insecta
- Order: Odonata
- Infraorder: Anisoptera
- Family: Libellulidae
- Genus: Porpax; Karsch, 1896

Type species
- Porpax asperipes Karsch, 1896

= Porpax (dragonfly) =

Genus of dragonflies

Porpax is a genus of dragonflies in the family Libellulidae. The five species in the genus are all endemic to tropical Africa:

- Porpax asperipes Karsch, 1896
- Porpax risi Pinhey, 1958
- Porpax garambensis Pinhey, 1966
- Porpax bipunctus Pinhey, 1966
- Porpax sentipes Dijkstra, 2006
