= Elliot Pinhey =

Elliot Charles Gordon Pinhey (18 July 1910 in Knokke, Bruges – 7 May 1999 in Cowfold near Horsham, West Sussex) was an entomologist who worked in Africa and specialised in African Lepidoptera and Odonata. Born of British parents on holiday in Belgium, Pinhey made major contributions in entomology to the knowledge of butterflies, moths and dragonflies. Elliot Pinhey's interest in natural history first developed during his early education in England.

He obtained a BSc at the University of London in mathematics, physics, chemistry and biology in 1934, after which he joined the teaching profession as a Science Master. His chronically poor health led to his doctor's suggesting he emigrate to a more congenial climate. Accordingly, he arrived in Southern Rhodesia in 1939 and took up a teaching post as Science Master. A stint with the Royal Air Force Meteorology department followed, and on his release he joined the Agriculture Department as economic entomologist, working on Acarina, Coccoidea and Chrysomelidae. His interest in Odonata surfaced in 1947 through J.A. Whelan who had joined his department, and Colonel F.C. Fraser who encouraged him.

He joined the Transvaal Museum in Pretoria as assistant professional officer in entomology and later became the museum's Odonata specialist. He was with the Coryndon Museum in Nairobi from 1949 to 1955 under Dr. LSB Leakey, during which period he was able to collect extensively in East and Central Africa, and develop an interest in Orthoptera and Hemiptera which he was not able to follow up. Pinhey was invited in 1955 to take up the position of Keeper of Invertebrate Zoology at the National Museum in Bulawayo. He was awarded a D.Sc. by the University of London in 1962 for his publications in entomology.

He served as President of the Entomological Society of Southern Africa from 1974 to 1975, was an active member of the Societas Internationalis Odonatologica (SIO) and was widely regarded as the doyen of African Odonatology.

Elliot Pinhey published almost 200 names for species, subspecies and forms of Odonata in thirty-three years, from 1950 to 1982. He named more than a tenth of known Afrotropical species, making him the most prolific author of that fauna aside from his predecessor, Frederic Fraser (Dijkstra et al. 2003). Sixty-three percent of his primary types are held in the Natural History Museum of Zimbabwe in Bulawayo (NMBZ), where he worked from 1955 to 1980. His legacy is one of the major collections of African Odonata in the world and the most important one in the continent itself (Vick et al. 2001). There are 112 name-bearing types designated by Pinhey,

Elliot Pinhey on a field trip on the edge of Dichwe forest, Rhodesia in 1978, taken by Cathy Car

His numerous collecting trips led him to associate with such authorities as Dr Henry Bernard Davis Kettlewell (lepidopterist and geneticist known for his research on industrial melanism), Capt. Norman Denbigh Riley (1890–1979)(Keeper of Entomology at the British Museum), Richard South, Edward Bagnall Poulton (Hope Professor of Zoology at Oxford), G.D. Hale Carpenter (Hope Professor of Entomology) and Poulton's successor, Sir Guy Anstruther Knox Marshall KCMG FRS (1872–1959) specialist in Curculionidae of the British Museum (Natural History), Baron Charles de Worms and Frederick William Frohawk.

Pinhey obtained material from species-rich, poorly accessible areas, such as NW Republic of Congo and near the confluence of the Angola, Democratic Republic of Congo and Zambia borders. Therefore, his collection includes a large proportion of 'rare' species. Species described by Pinhey and known only from the type series and/or material in NMBZ are Chlorocypha rubriventris, Africallagma cuneistigma, Pseudagrion estesi, Aciagrion macrootithenae, A. nodosum, A. zambiense, Aeshna moori, Onychogomphus rossii, Paragomphus zambeziensis and Trithemis fumosa. New records have only come to light recently for Prodasineura flavifacies, Ceriagrion mourae and Paragomphus cataractae. Other rarities are Chlorocypha frigida, C. schmidti, Platycypha picta, Elattoneura incerta, Allocnemis mitwabae, Pseudagrion coeruleipunctum, P. greeni, Crocothemis brevistigma, Neodythemis fitzgeraldi and Trithemis brydeni.

== Family life ==
Elliot Pinhey and his wife Nancy had one child, a daughter named Rosalind. They retired to Billingham, West Sussex where Elliot Pinhey fell ill in 1989 and had two light strokes. His failing health necessitated his staying at a nursing home in Cowfold near Horsham until his death in 1999.

== Papers and books ==
- Pinhey, E., 1951. The dragonflies of Southern Africa. Transvaal Museum Memoir 5: 1–335.
- Pinhey, E., 1959. A new dragonfly from Southern Rhodesia. Occasional Papers of the National Museum of Southern Rhodesia (B) 3:340-342. [Microgomphus mozambicensis].
- Pinhey, E., 1960. Odonata collected by Oxford University Tanganyika Expedition: and a West African species. Occasional Papers of the National Museum of Southern Rhodesia (B) 3:509-515. [Acanthagyna ochraceipes, Zygonyx rougeoti].
- Pinhey, E., 1961a. Dragonflies (Odonata) of Central Africa. Occasional Papers of the Rhodes-Livingstone Museum 14: 1–97.[Crocothemis brevistigma, Neodythemis fitzgeraldi, Zygonyx flavicosta mwinilungae].
- Pinhey, E., 1961b. Dragonflies collected on an expedition from Rhodesia to Nigeria in 1958, Part 1, observations on the journey and the new discoveries in dragonflies. Entomologist's Monthly Magazine 96: 256–271. [Onychogomphus kitchingmani, Paragomphus zambeziensis, Tragogomphus mamfei, Malgassophlebia bispina nigeriae, Neodythemis gorillae, Orthetrum rhodesiae, Trithemis aenea, T. grouti, Zygonyx ikomae].
- Pinhey, E., 1961c. Some dragonflies (Odonata) from Angola; and descriptions of three new species of the family Gomphidae. Publicacoes Culturais Companhia de Diamantes de Angola 56: 79–86. [Microgomphus witchwoodensis].
- Pinhey, E., 1961d. A survey of the dragonflies (order Odonata) of Eastern Africa. British Museum (Natural History), London. [Trithemis monardi imitata].
- Pinhey, E., 1962a. New or little known dragonflies (Odonata) of Central and Southern Africa. Occasional Papers of the National Museum of Southern Rhodesia (B) 3: 892–911. [Anax congoliath lisomboae].
- Pinhey, E., 1962b. Some records of Odonata collected in Tropical Africa. Journal of the Entomological Society of Southern Africa 25: 20–50. [Heliaeschna sembe, Aethiothemis watulikii, Tetrathemis sulci, Trithemis fumosa].
- Pinhey, E., 1962c. A descriptive catalogue of the Odonata of the African continent (up to December 1959) (part II). Publicações Culturais da Companhia de Diamantes de Angola 59: 165–324.
- Pinhey, E., 1963a. A remarkable new primitive dragonfly (Odonata) from the Victoria Falls. Novos Taxa Entomologicos 32: 1–6. [Archaeophlebia victoriae].
- Pinhey, E., 1963b. Some anomalous types of African Odonata and the description of a new species. Journal of the Entomological Society of Southern Africa 26: 146–160. [Paragomphus cataractae].
- Pinhey, E., 1964a. Dragonflies (Odonata) of the Angola-Congo borders of Rhodesia. Publicacoes Culturais Companhia de Diamantes de Angola 63: 97–130. [Aeshna rileyi raphaeli, Onychogomphus quirkii, Allorhizucha longistipes, Zygonyx atritibiae].
- Pinhey, E., 1964b. A revision of the African members of the genus Pseudagrion Selys (Odonata). Revista de Entomologia de Moçambique 7: 5–196.
- Pinhey, E., 1966a. New distributional records for African Odonata and notes on a few larvae. Arnoldia Rhodesia 2 (26): 1–5. [Onychogomphus rossii].
- Pinhey, E., 1966b. Notes on African Odonata, particularly type material. Revue de Zoologie et de Botanique Africaines 73: 283–308.
- Pinhey, E., 1966c. Odonata. Exploration du Parc National de la Garamba 45: 1–114. [Orthetrum latihami, O. saegeri, Porpax bipunctus].
- Pinhey, E., 1967. Odonata of Ngamiland (1967). Arnoldia Rhodesia 3 (15): 1–17. [Gomphidia guyi].
- Pinhey, E., 1969a. A new species of Gomphidae (Odonata) from Cape Province. Novos Taxa Entomologicos 69: 3–5. [Paragomphus dicksoni].
- Pinhey, E., 1969b. Tandem linkage in dichoptic and other Anisoptera (Odonata). Occasional Papers of the National Museum of Southern Rhodesia 4: 137–207.
- Pinhey, E., 1970a. Monographic study of the genus Trithemis Brauer (Odonata: Libellulidae). Memoirs of the Entomological Society of Southern Africa 11: 1–159. [Trithemis arteriosa ennediensis, T. arteriosa form socotrensis, T. bifida, T. brydeni, T. caruncula, T. congolica, T. falconis, T. jacksoni, T. kirbyi ardens form aurantiaca, T. monardi insuffusa, T. pluvialis var. melanisticta].
- Pinhey, E., 1970b. A new approach to African Orthetrum (Odonata). Occasional Papers of the National Museum of Southern Rhodesia (B) 4: 261–321. [Orthetrum abbotti malgassicum, O. chrysostigma toddii, O. icteromelan cinctifrons].
- Pinhey, E., 1970c. The status of Cinitogomphus Pinhey (Odonata). Arnoldia Rhodesia 4 (38): 1–5.
- Pinhey, E., 1971a. Odonata collected in Republique Centre-Africaine by R. Pujol. Arnoldia Rhodesia 5 (18): 1–16. [Nesciothemis pujoli].
- Pinhey, E., 1971b. Odonata of Fernando Po Island and of neighbouring Cameroons Territory. Journal of the Entomological Society of Southern Africa 34: 215–230.
- Pinhey, E., 1974. Three undescribed Odonata taxa from Africa. Arnoldia Rhodesia 7 (2): 1–6. [Gomphidia quarrei confinii, Eleuthemis buettikoferi quadrigutta].
- Pinhey, E., 1976. Dragonflies (Odonata) of Botswana, with ecological notes. Occasional Papers of the National Museum of Southern Rhodesia (B) 5: 524–601. [Phyllogomphus brunneus, Macromia paludosa, Diplacodes okavangoensis].
- Pinhey, E., 1978. Comparative notes on an African species of Trithemis Brauer (Odonata:Anisoptera) and its congeners. Arnoldia Rhodesia 8 (26): 1–8. [Trithemis donaldsoni dejouxi].
- Pinhey, E., 1981a. Notes on the distribution of Tetrathemis polleni (Selys) and a new subspecies of Zygonyx torrida (Kirby) (Odonata: Libellulidae). Arnoldia Zimbabwe 9 (6): 73–76. [Zygonyx torrida insulana].
- Pinhey, E., 1981b. Two interesting species of Aeshna Fabricius from Zambia (Odonata:Aeshnidae). Arnoldia Zimbabwe 9 (4): 61–68. [Aeshna moori].
- Pinhey, E., 1984. A checklist of the Odonata of Zimbabwe and Zambia. Smithersia 3: 1–64.
- Pinhey, E. & N. Pinhey, 1984. A preliminary list of the Odonata collected by Dr J. Kielland in Tanzania for Dr M.A. Lieftinck. Odonatologica 13: 129–138.

== Sources ==
- The name-bearing types of Odonata held in the Natural History Museum of Zimbabwe, with systematic notes on Afrotropical taxa.Part 1: introduction and Anisoptera - Klaas-Douwe B. Dijkstra
- Moths of Southern Africa - Elliot Pinhey (Tafelberg, Cape Town November 1975) ISBN 0-624-00784-7

== Publications ==
- Butterflies of Rhodesia - with a short introduction to the insect world (Rhodesia Scientific Association, Salisbury 1949)
- Hawk Moths of Central and Southern Africa (1962) ISBN
- The Butterflies of Southern Africa (1965)
- Introduction to Insect Study in Africa (London : O.U.P., 1968) ISBN 0-19-416503-5
- Emperor Moths of South and South-Central Africa (Struik, Cape Town 1972) ISBN 0-86977-016-0
- A Guide to the Insects of Zambia (with Ian Loe) (1973)
- A Guide to the Insects of Africa (with Ian Loe) (Hamlyn, 1974) ISBN 0-600-34855-5
- Odonata of the Northwest Cameroons and particularly of the islands stretching southwards from the Guinea Gulf (1974 Bonn. zool. Beitr. 25(1-3):179-212)
- A collection of Odonata from Angola (Arnoldia 7(23): 1-16 (1975))
- Moths of Southern Africa (Tafelberg, Cape Town November 1975) ISBN 0-624-00784-7
- Some Well Known African Moths (Longman 1975) ISBN 0-582-64171-3
- A Guide to the Butterflies of Zambia (with Ian D. Loe) (Lusaka, Anglo American Corporation (Central Africa) 1977)ISBN 0 903 84102 9
- Odonata of the Seychelles and other Indian Ocean island groups (with Blackman, R. A. A) based primarily on the Bristol University Expedition of 1964-1965. Arnoldia 3 (12): 1–38.
