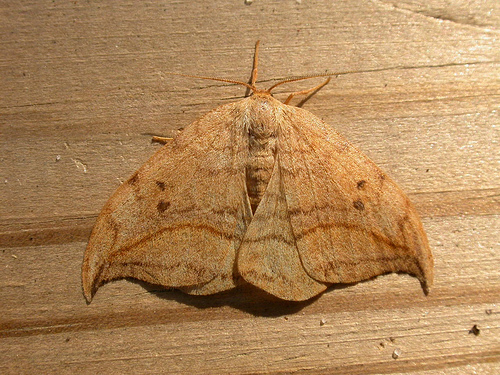
- Drepana curvatula

Scientific classification
- Domain: Eukaryota
- Kingdom: Animalia
- Phylum: Arthropoda
- Class: Insecta
- Order: Lepidoptera
- Family: Drepanidae
- Subfamily: Drepaninae
- Tribe: Drepanini
- Genus: Drepana; Schrank, 1802

Synonyms
- Platypteryx Laspeyres, 1803; Drepania Hübner, [1819]; Syssaura Hübner, [1819]; Cleopteryx Gistl, 1848

= Drepana (moth) =

Moth genus in family Drepanidae

Drepana is a genus of moths belonging to the subfamily Drepaninae. The genus was erected by Franz von Paula Schrank in 1802.

== Species ==
- Subgenus Drepana Schrank, 1802
  - Drepana curvatula (Borkhausen, 1790)
  - Drepana dispilata Warren, 1922
  - Drepana falcataria (Linnaeus, 1758)
  - Drepana pallida Moore, 1879
  - Drepana rufofasciata Hampson, [1893]
- Subgenus Watsonalla Minet, 1985
  - Drepana binaria (Hufnagel, 1767)
  - Drepana cultraria (Fabricius, 1775)
  - Drepana uncinula (Borkhausen, 1790)
- Subgenus unknown
  - Drepana arcuata Walker, 1855

== Former species ==
- Drepana argenteola Moore
- Drepana micacea Walker
