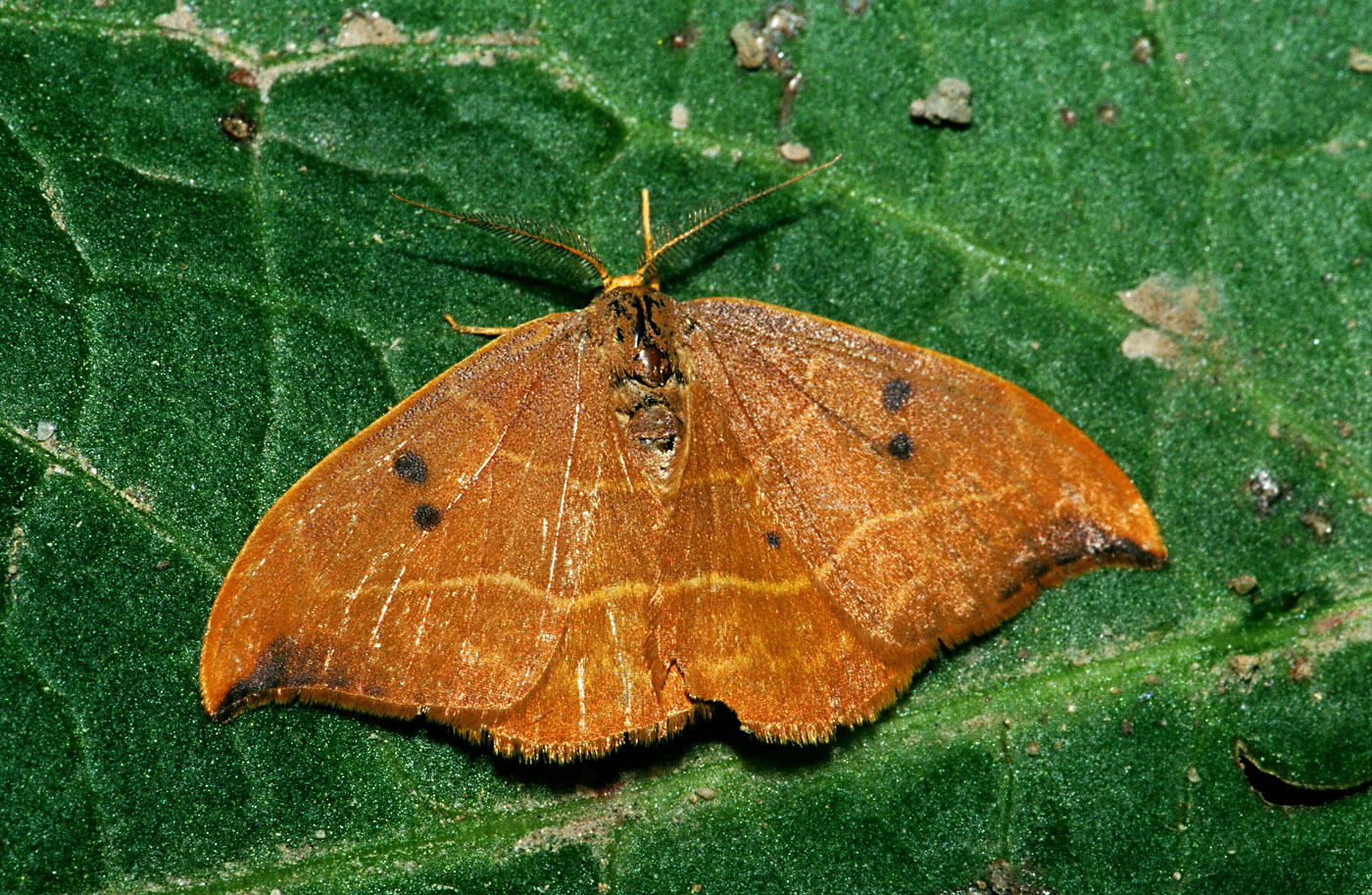

Scientific classification
- Domain: Eukaryota
- Kingdom: Animalia
- Phylum: Arthropoda
- Class: Insecta
- Order: Lepidoptera
- Family: Drepanidae
- Genus: Drepana
- Species: D. binaria

Binomial name
- Drepana binaria (Hufnagel, 1767)

Synonyms
- List: Phalaena binaria Hufnagel, 1767; Falcaria binaria Phalaena (Bombyx) hamula; Esper, 1786 Drepana uncula; Hübner, 1800 Drepana binaria var. meridionalis; Millière, 1877 Drepana binaria var. umbratula; Staudinger, 1901 Drepana binaria ab. liliputaria Strand, 1911; Drepana binaria ab. cultrarioides Dannehl, 1929; Drepana binaria var. obtecta Dannehl, 1929

= Oak hook-tip =

Oak hook-moth

Species of moth

The oak hook-tip (Watsonalla binaria) is a moth of the family Drepanidae. It is found in most of Europe except the far north. It is quite common in England and Wales, but not found in Scotland and only recently in Ireland. The species was first described by Johann Siegfried Hufnagel in 1767.

The sexes differ in size (male wingspan about 30 mm, female about 35 mm), but are similar in colour. The fore wings are orange-brown with three narrow yellow fascia (the outer one being faint and sometimes absent) with two dark discal spots between the inner two fascia. Sometimes, these occur, but weaker, on the rear wings. The apex of the fore wings is hook shaped, giving the species its name. The hind wings are lighter orange, again with three yellow fascia. Usually two broods are produced each year, the adults flying in May and June and again in August. Second-generation moths are much smaller and slightly lighter coloured than those of the first. They are very similar to Watsonalla cultraria which also has a yellowish-brown colour. Two black twin points on the front wings are the clearest differentiator. The species sometimes flies during the day, but usually flies at night and is attracted to light.

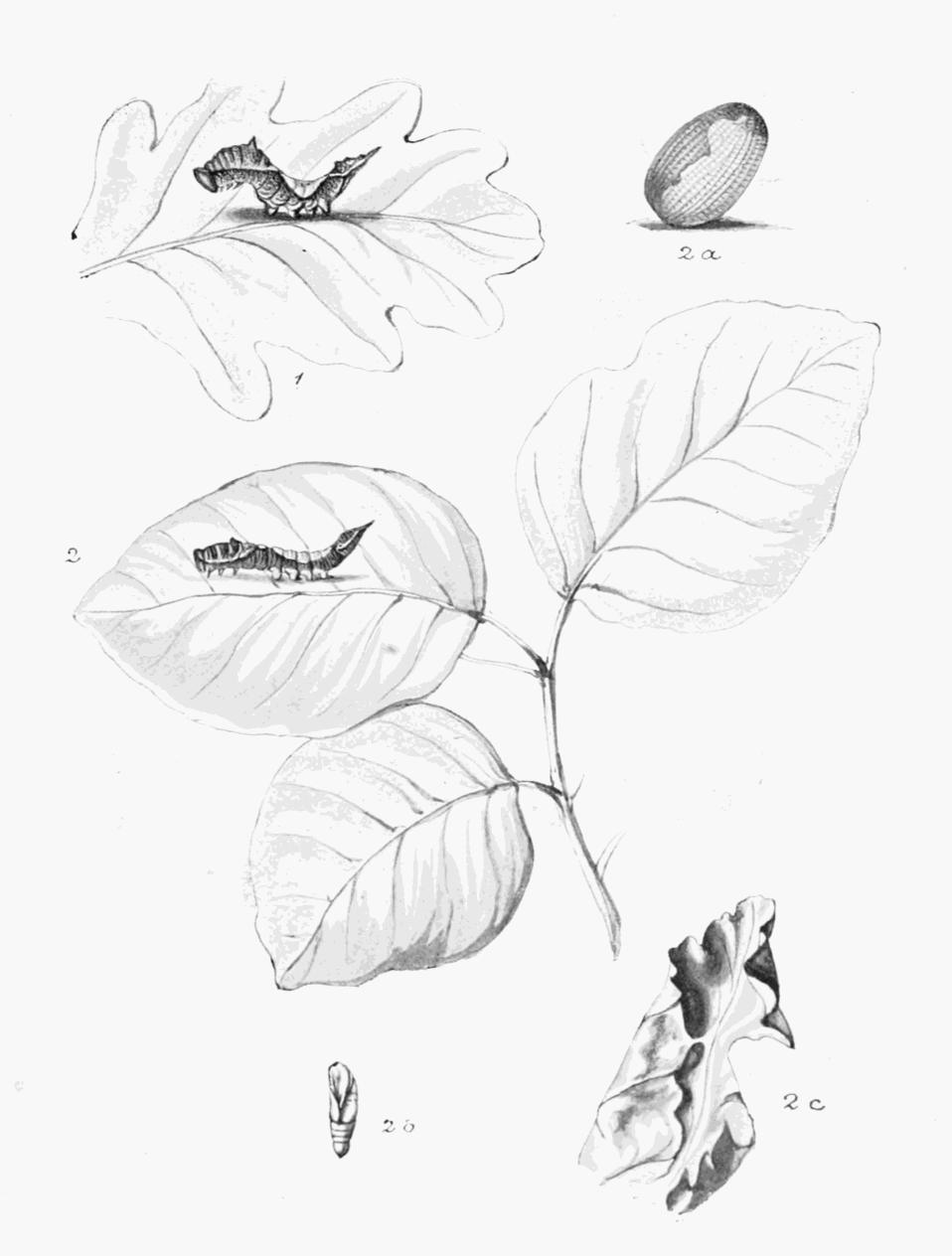
larva (figure 1)

The larva is brown with yellow markings and shows the typical drepanid shape with a tapered tail. It usually feeds on oak, but has also been recorded on alder, beech, and birch. The species overwinters as pupae.

1. The flight season refers to the British Isles. This may vary in other parts of the range.
