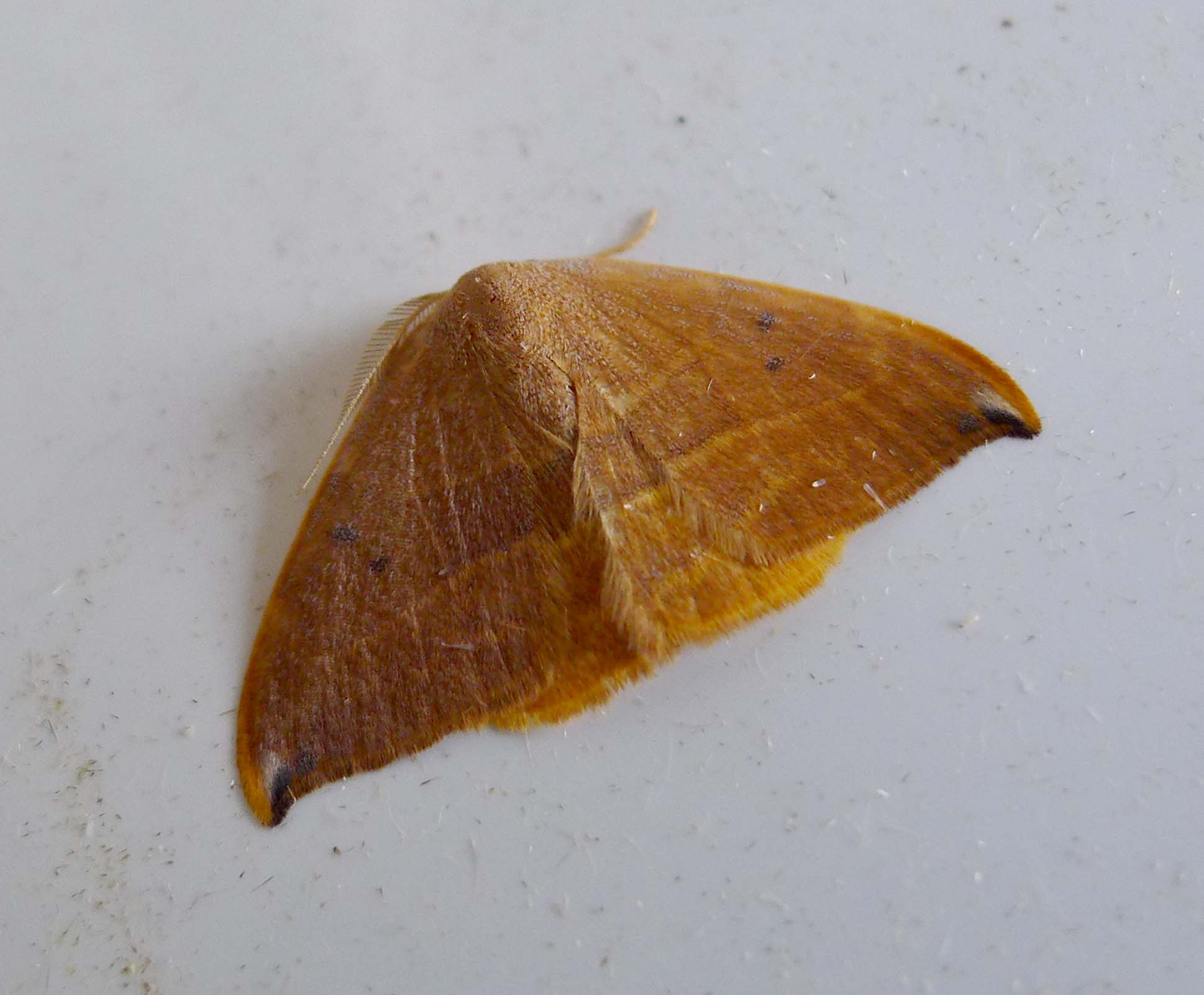

Scientific classification
- Kingdom: Animalia
- Phylum: Arthropoda
- Clade: Pancrustacea
- Class: Insecta
- Order: Lepidoptera
- Family: Drepanidae
- Genus: Drepana
- Species: D. uncinula

Binomial name
- Drepana uncinula (Borkhausen, 1790)

Synonyms
- Phalaena uncinula Borkhausen, 1790; Drepana oranaria Strand, 1911

= Drepana uncinula =

Spiny hook-tip

Species of hook-tip moth

Drepana uncinula, the spiny hook-tip, is a moth in the family Drepanidae.

== Nomenclature ==
It is part of the Drepana subgenus Watsonalla. It was first described by Moritz Balthasar Borkhausen in 1790.

== Distribution ==
It is found in France, Spain, Portugal, Italy and the western and southern part of the Balkan Peninsula.

== Description ==
The wingspan is 18–30 mm for males and 25–35 mm for females. There are three generations per year, with adults on wing from April to the end of September.

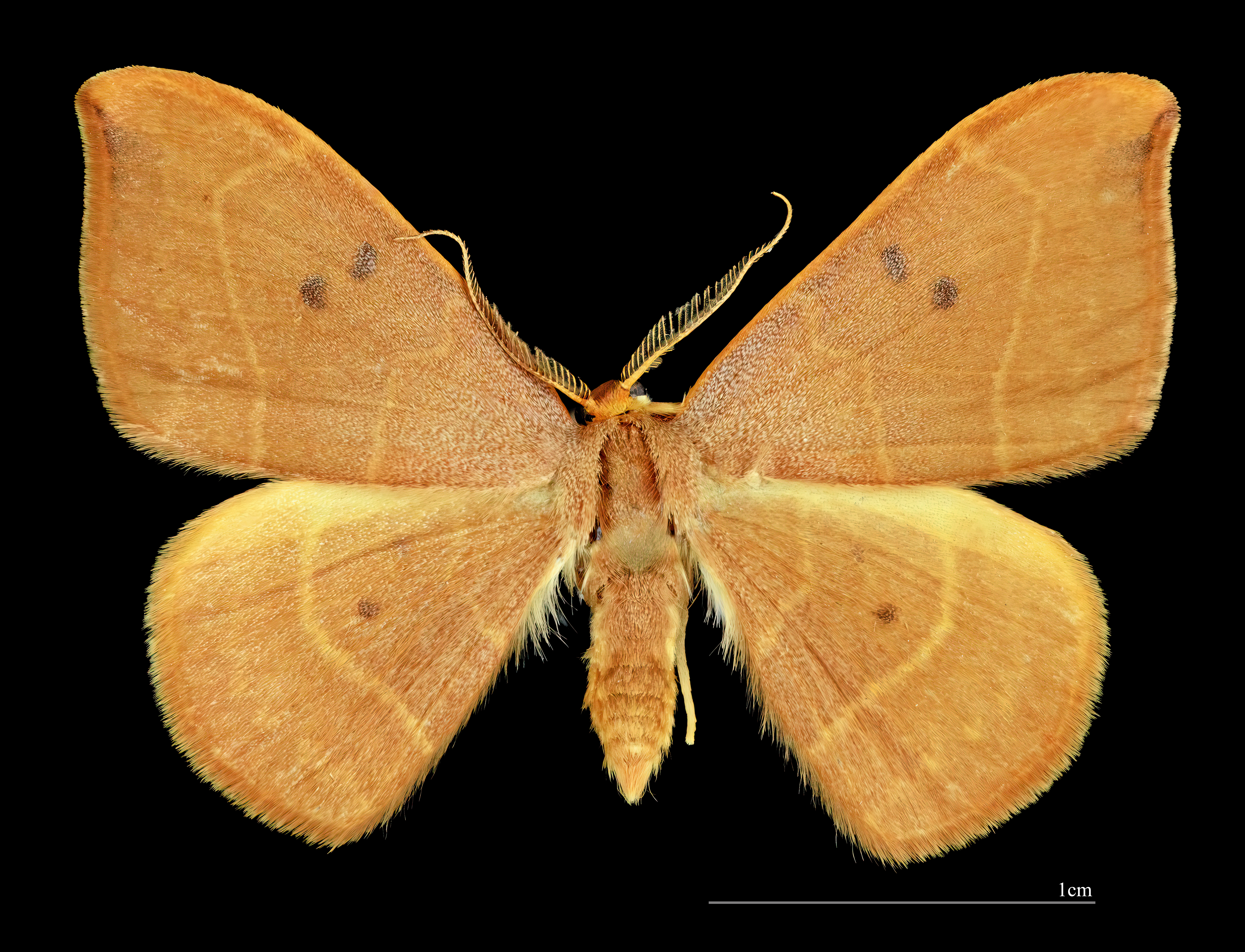
♂

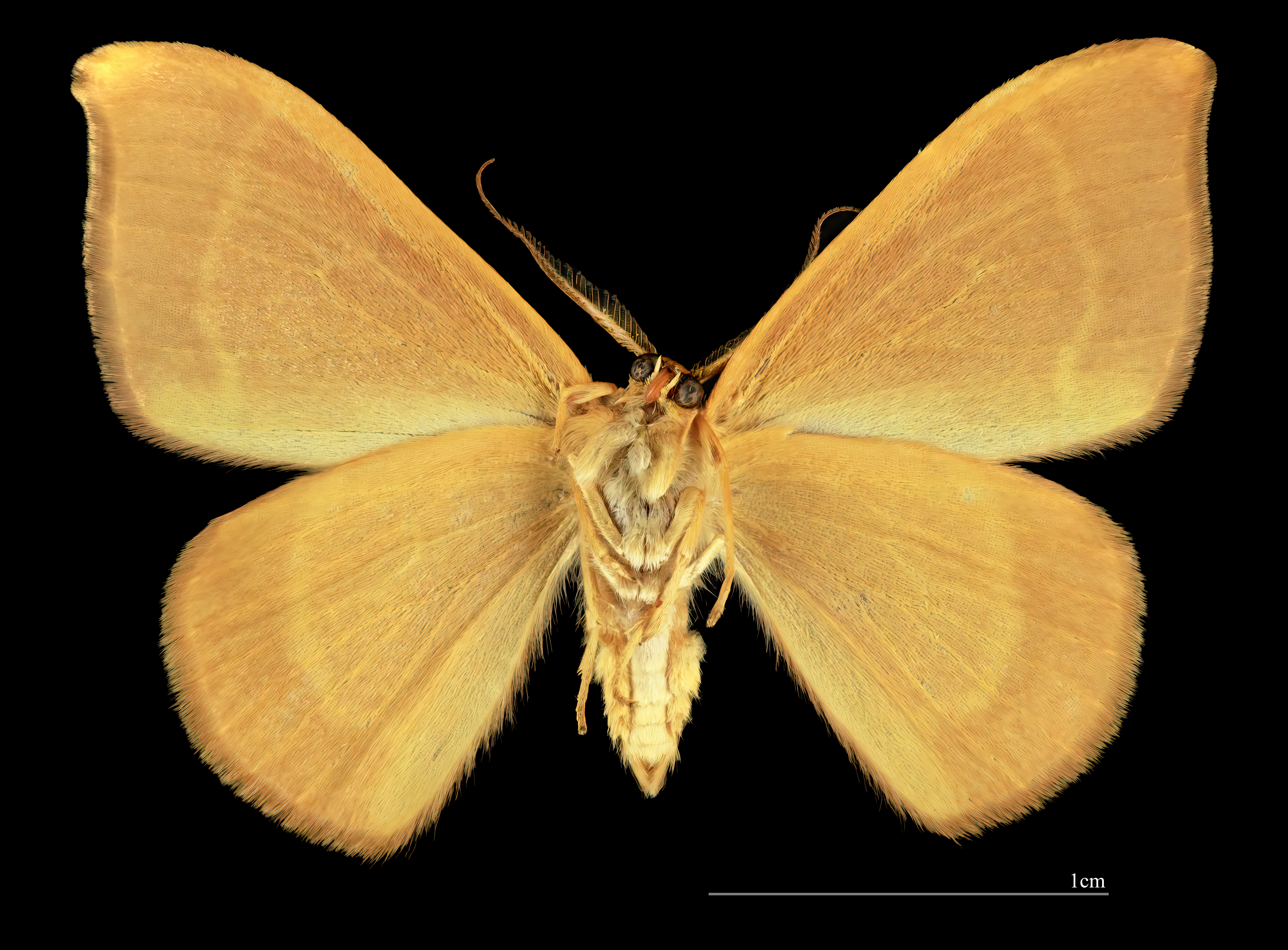
△ ♂

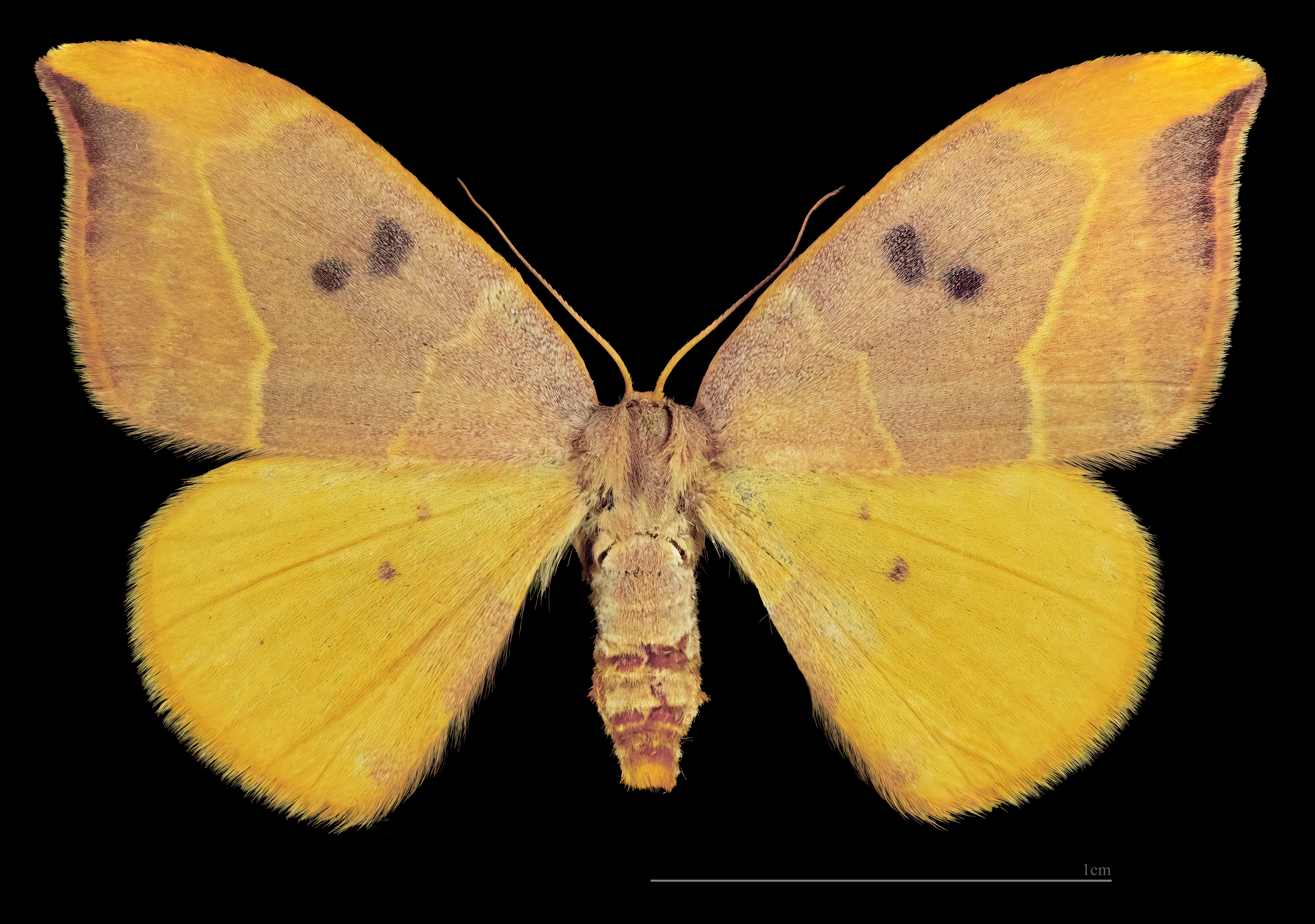
♀

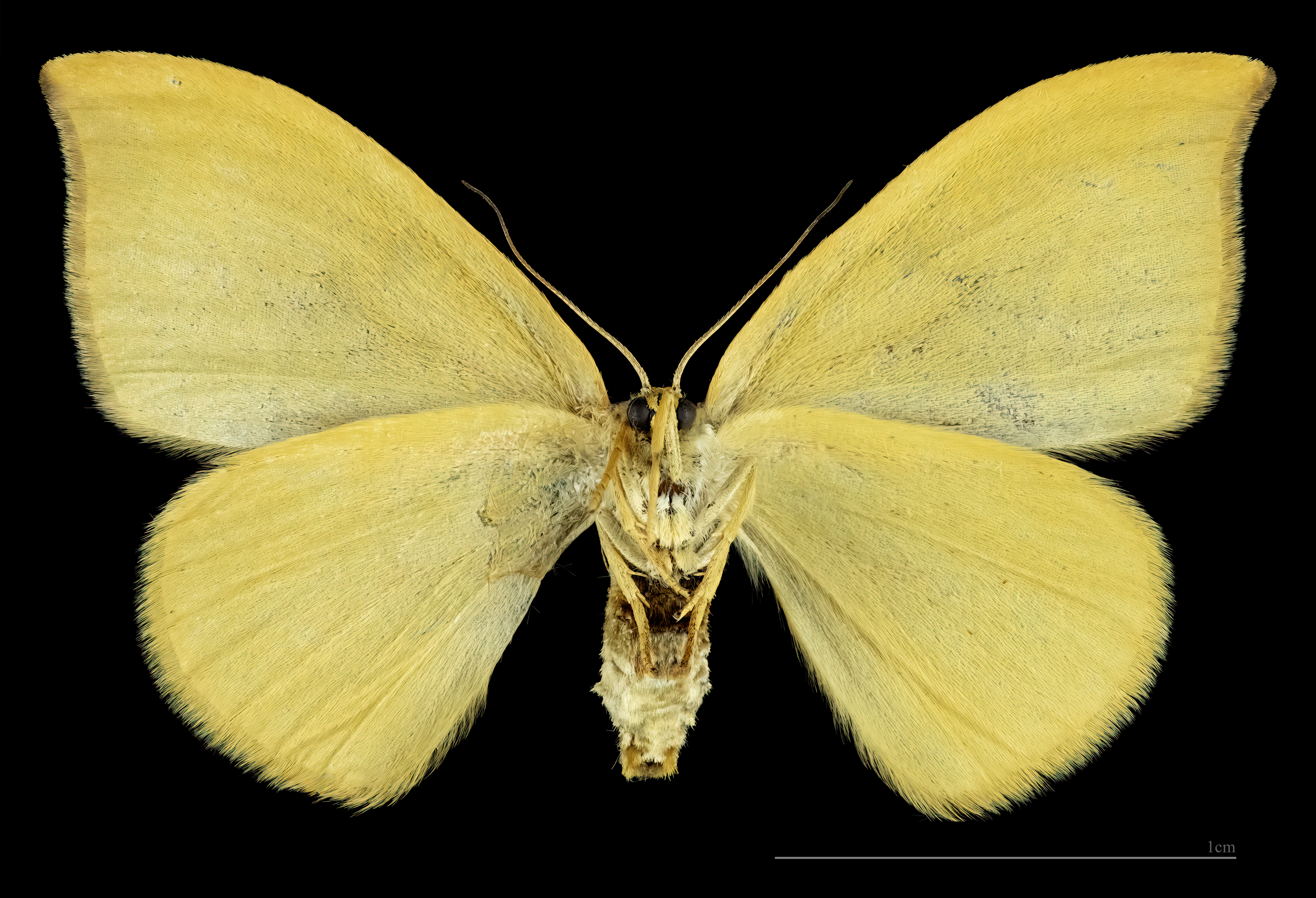
♀ △

== Biology ==
The larvae feed on Quercus species, including Quercus ilex.
