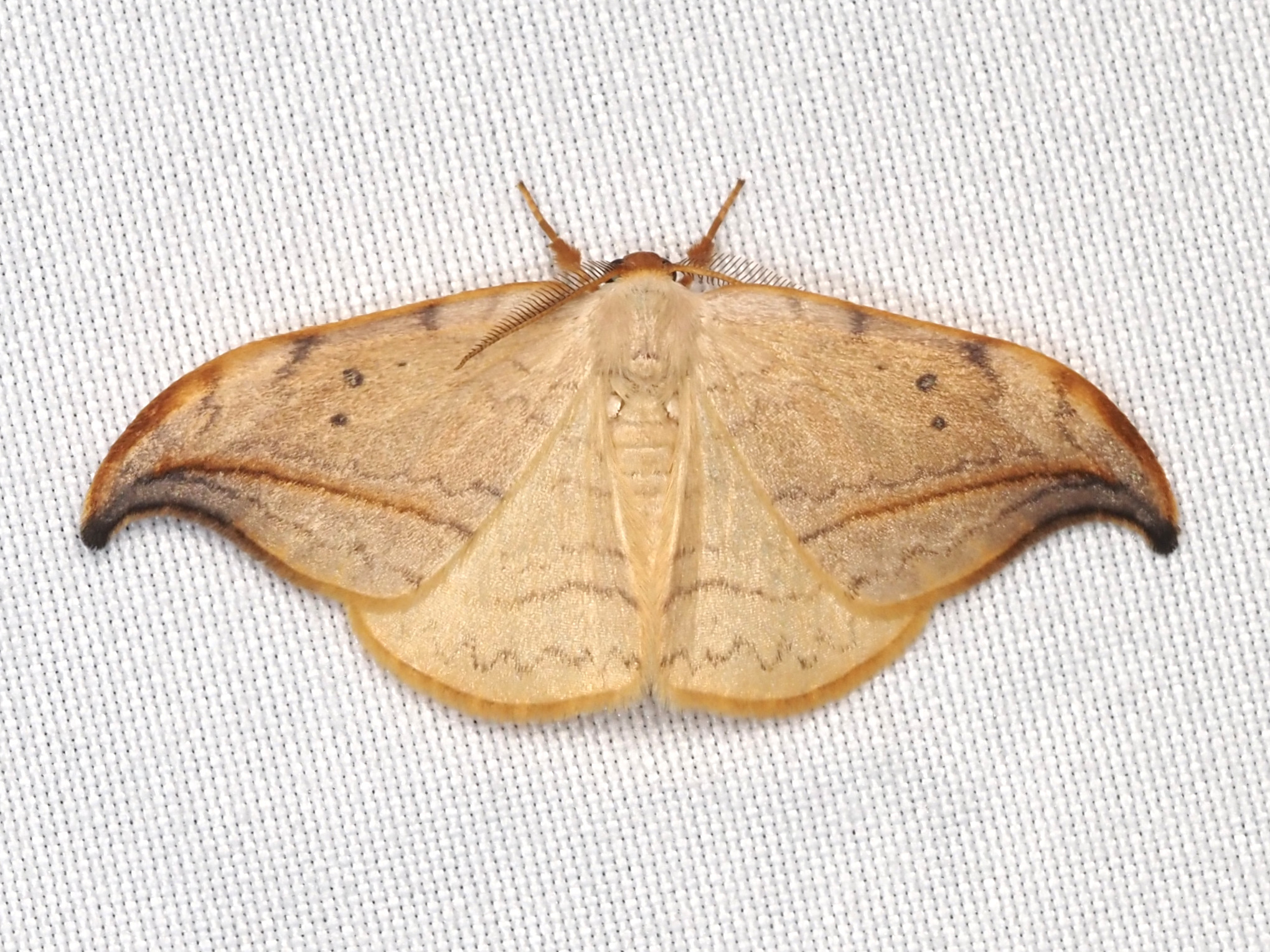

Scientific classification
- Kingdom: Animalia
- Phylum: Arthropoda
- Clade: Pancrustacea
- Class: Insecta
- Order: Lepidoptera
- Family: Drepanidae
- Genus: Drepana
- Species: D. arcuata

Binomial name
- Drepana arcuata Walker, 1855

Synonyms
- Drepana fabula (Grote, 1862); Drepana genicula (Grote, 1862); Drepana grotei Barnes & Benjamin, 1922; Drepana arcuata siculifer Packard, 1872; Drepana arcuata alaskensis Barnes & Benjamin, 1922

= Drepana arcuata =

Species of hook-tip moth

Drepana arcuata, the arched hooktip or masked birch caterpillar, is a moth of the family Drepanidae. The species was first described by Francis Walker in 1855. It is found from Newfoundland to Vancouver Island, south to at least North Carolina, South Carolina and California.

The wingspan is 24–40 millimetres (0.94–1.57 in). Adults are on wing from mid-May through late-July. There is one generation per year in the north.

The larvae feed on Betula papyrifera and Alnus species, which they may use as a medium to communicate. Sound is produced by shaking their bodies, drumming and scraping their mouthparts, or dragging specialised anal "oars" against the surface of a leaf. Larvae build communal silk shelters and the sounds may attract other larva to the shelter.

Drepana arcuata larva
