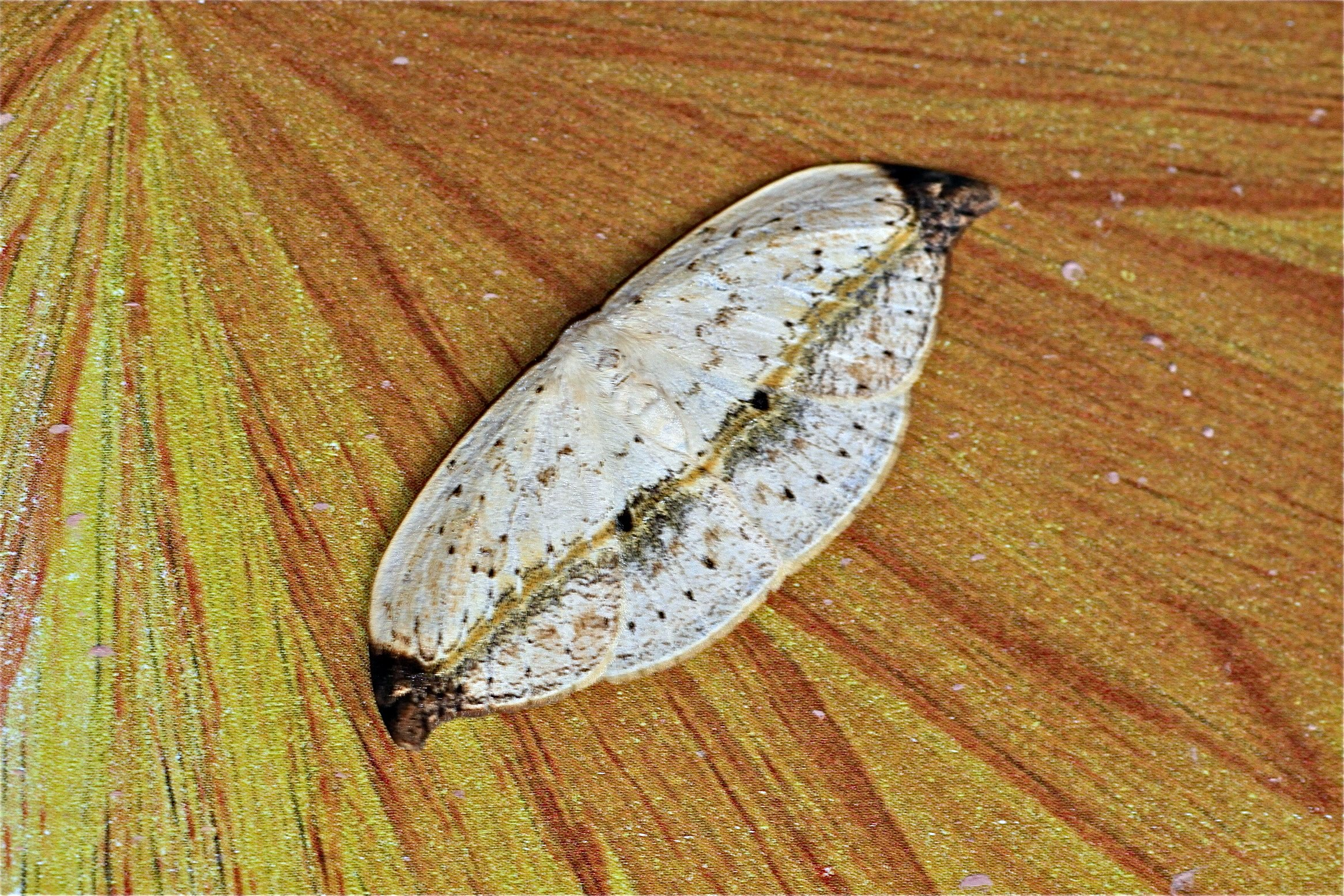

Scientific classification
- Domain: Eukaryota
- Kingdom: Animalia
- Phylum: Arthropoda
- Class: Insecta
- Order: Lepidoptera
- Family: Drepanidae
- Genus: Callidrepana
- Species: C. albiceris

Binomial name
- Callidrepana albiceris (C. Swinhoe, 1907)

Synonyms
- Drepana albiceris C. Swinhoe, 1907

= Callidrepana albiceris =

Species of hook-tip moth

Callidrepana albiceris is a moth in the family Drepanidae first described by Charles Swinhoe in 1907. It is found in Sundaland. The habitat consists of hill dipterocarp forests, limestone forests, lower montane forests and lowland forests.

Adults are whitish buff, the wings sparsely covered with very minute orange-brown specks and a few larger black specks. There is a transverse brown band, composed of three lines close together from near the apex of the forewings, where there is a small brown patch with a pale centre, to the middle of the abdominal margin of the hindwings. On the hindwings, the band is accompanied by some slight blackish suffusion, and is obsolete above vein 6, and at the end of the cell. Touching the inner margin of the band is a rather prominent black spot and on both wings, there are submarginal black dots, close to the margin at the apex of forewings, widening from the margin hindwards.
