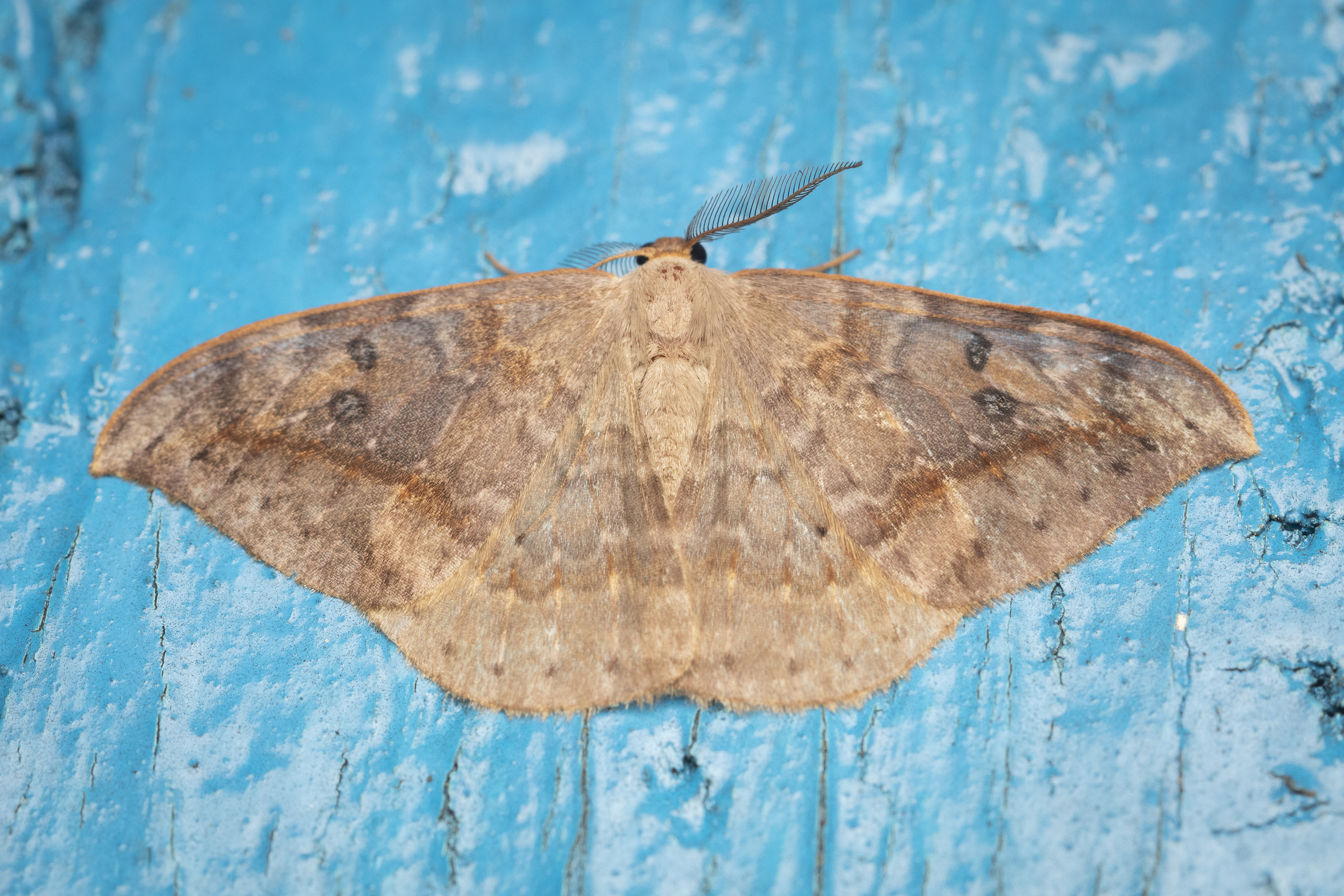

Scientific classification
- Kingdom: Animalia
- Phylum: Arthropoda
- Class: Insecta
- Order: Lepidoptera
- Family: Drepanidae
- Genus: Drepana
- Species: D. dispilata

Binomial name
- Drepana dispilata Warren, 1922

Synonyms
- Drepana x-z-nigrum Bryk, 1943; Drepana grisearia Leech, 1898 (preocc. Staudinger, 1892); Drepana grisearipennis Strand, 1911

= Drepana dispilata =

Species of hook-tip moth

Drepana dispilata is a moth in the family Drepanidae. It was described by Warren in 1922. It is found in northern India, Sikkim, northern Myanmar and the Chinese provinces of Sichuan, Yunnan and Shaanxi.

== Subspecies ==
- Drepana dispilata dispilata (northern India, Sikkim, northern Myanmar)
- Drepana dispilata grisearipennis Strand, 1911 (China: Sichuan)
- Drepana dispilata rufata Watson, 1968 (China: Yunnan, Shaanxi)
