= Callidrepana hirayamai =

Scientific classification
- Kingdom: Animalia
- Phylum: Arthropoda
- Clade: Pancrustacea
- Class: Insecta
- Order: Lepidoptera
- Family: Drepanidae
- Genus: Callidrepana
- Species: C. hirayamai

Binomial name
- Callidrepana hirayamai Nagano, 1918

Synonyms
- Callidrepana yakushimalis Yamamoto, 1960

Species of hook-tip moth

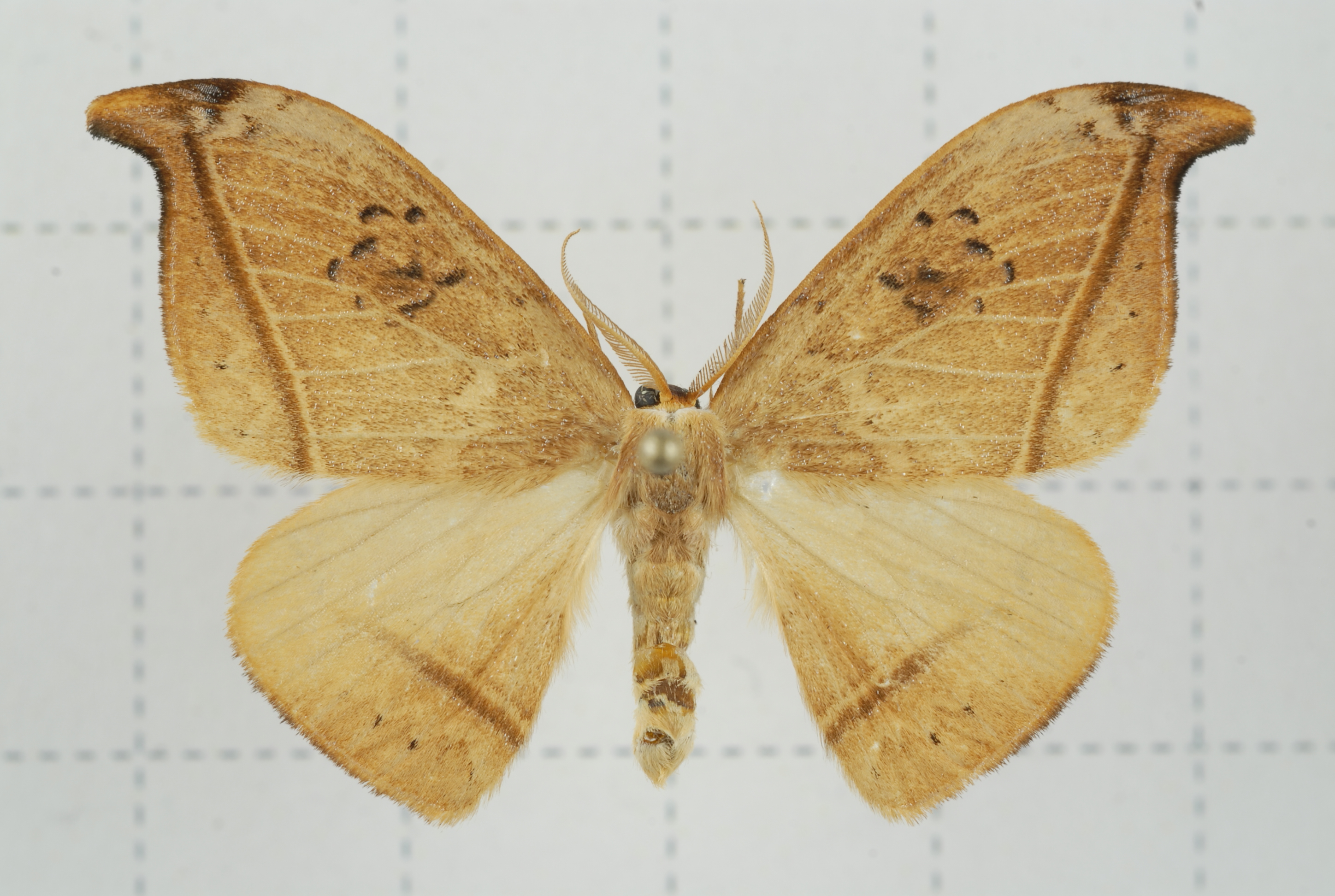
Callidrepana hirayamai

Callidrepana hirayamai is a moth in the family Drepanidae. It was first described by Kikujiro Nagano in 1918. It is found in Japan and the Chinese provinces of Fujian and Hunan.

The length of the forewings is 13.5–18 mm for males and 16.5–19 mm for females.

== Subspecies ==
- Callidrepana hirayamai hirayamai (Japan)
- Callidrepana hirayamai forcipulata Watson, 1968 (China: Fujian, Hunan)
