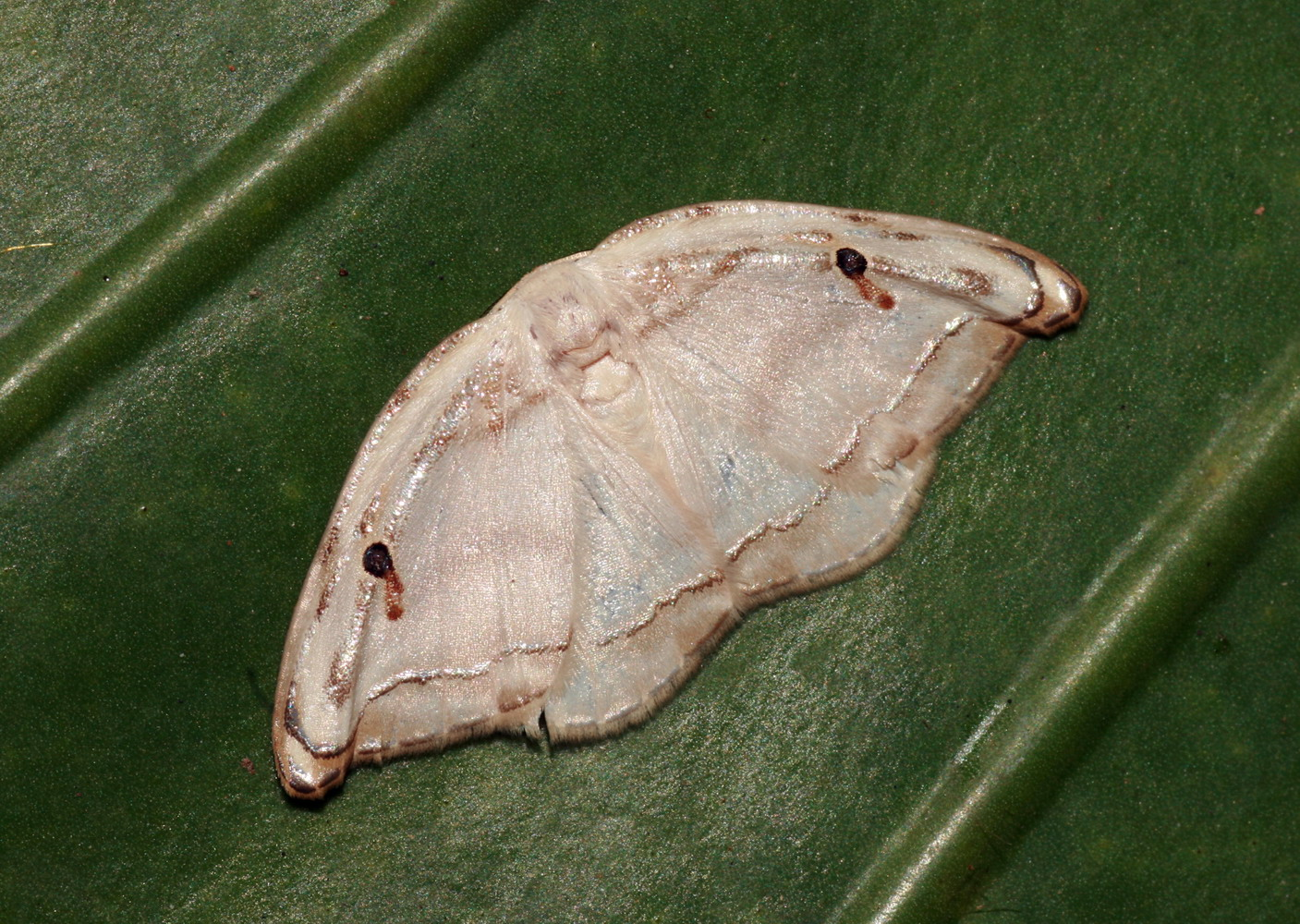

Scientific classification
- Kingdom: Animalia
- Phylum: Arthropoda
- Class: Insecta
- Order: Lepidoptera
- Family: Drepanidae
- Genus: Callidrepana
- Species: C. gelidata

Binomial name
- Callidrepana gelidata (Walker, [1863])

Synonyms
- Damna gelidata Walker, [1863]; Ticilia argentilinea Walker, 1865; Platypteryx argentilinea (Walker, 1865)

= Callidrepana gelidata =

Species of hook-tip moth

Callidrepana gelidata is a moth of the family Drepanidae. It is found in Borneo, Peninsular Malaysia, Singapore, Sumatra, Java, Burma and India.
