= Callidrepana saucia =

Scientific classification
- Domain: Eukaryota
- Kingdom: Animalia
- Phylum: Arthropoda
- Class: Insecta
- Order: Lepidoptera
- Family: Drepanidae
- Genus: Callidrepana
- Species: C. saucia

Binomial name
- Callidrepana saucia Felder, 1861

Synonyms
- Ausaris scintillata Walker, [1863]

Species of hook-tip moth

Callidrepana saucia is a moth in the family Drepanidae first described by Felder in 1861. It is found on Peninsular Malaysia, in New Guinea (including the Bismarck Islands) and Indonesia (Moluccas, Sulawesi, Borneo, Sumatra).

== Subspecies ==
- Callidrepana saucia saucia (Moluccas, Sulawesi, New Guinea, Bismarck Islands)
- Callidrepana saucia sundobscura Holloway, 1998 (Borneo, Sumatra, Peninsular Malaysia)
