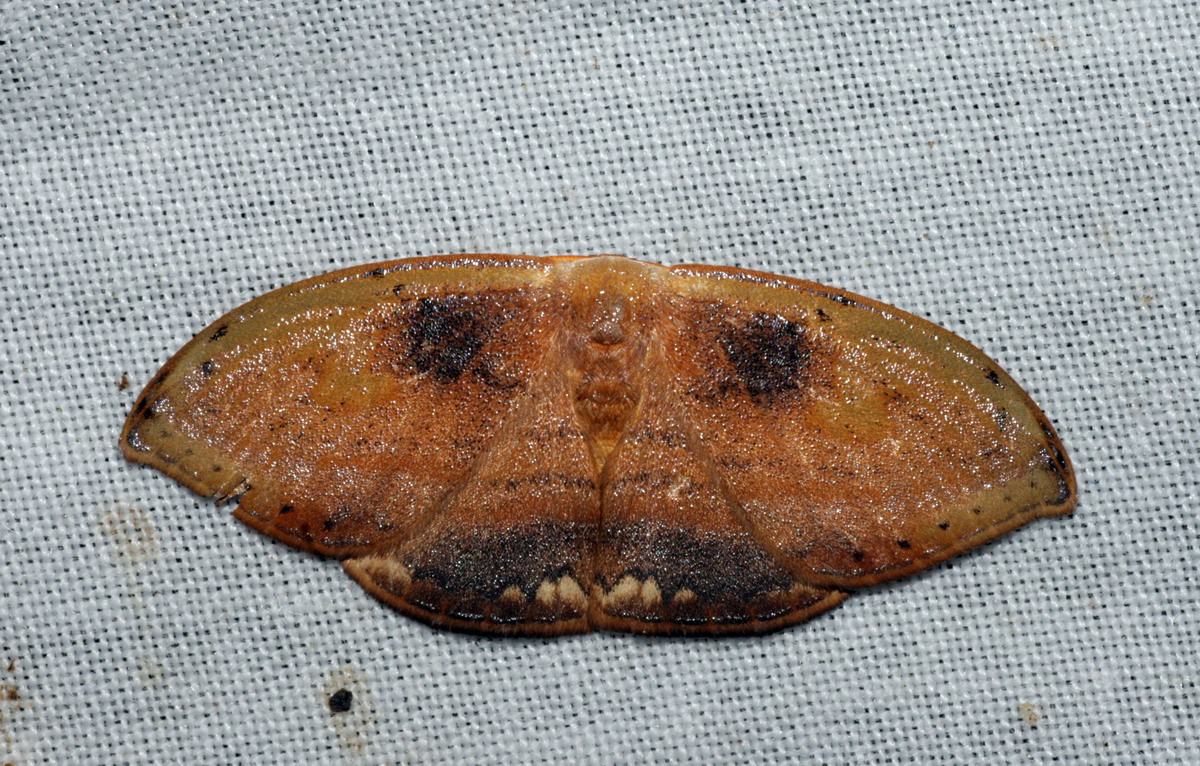

Scientific classification
- Kingdom: Animalia
- Phylum: Arthropoda
- Class: Insecta
- Order: Lepidoptera
- Family: Drepanidae
- Genus: Callidrepana
- Species: C. pulcherrima

Binomial name
- Callidrepana pulcherrima (Hampson, [1893])

Synonyms
- Drepana pulcherrima Hampson, [1893]; Callidrepana praeusta Warren, 1922

= Callidrepana pulcherrima =

Species of hook-tip moth

Callidrepana pulcherrima is a moth of the family Drepanidae. It is found in Burma, Peninsular Malaysia, Sumatra and Borneo.
