= Callidrepana gemina =

Scientific classification
- Domain: Eukaryota
- Kingdom: Animalia
- Phylum: Arthropoda
- Class: Insecta
- Order: Lepidoptera
- Family: Drepanidae
- Genus: Callidrepana
- Species: C. gemina

Binomial name
- Callidrepana gemina Watson, 1968

Species of hook-tip moth

Callidrepana gemina is a moth in the family Drepanidae. It is found in north-eastern India and the Chinese provinces of Guangdong, Fujian and Zhejiang.

The length of the forewings is 15–17 mm for males and 17.5–20 mm for females.

== Subspecies ==
- Callidrepana gemina gemina (north-eastern India)
- Callidrepana gemina curta Watson, 1968 (China: Guangdong, Fujian, Zhejiang)
