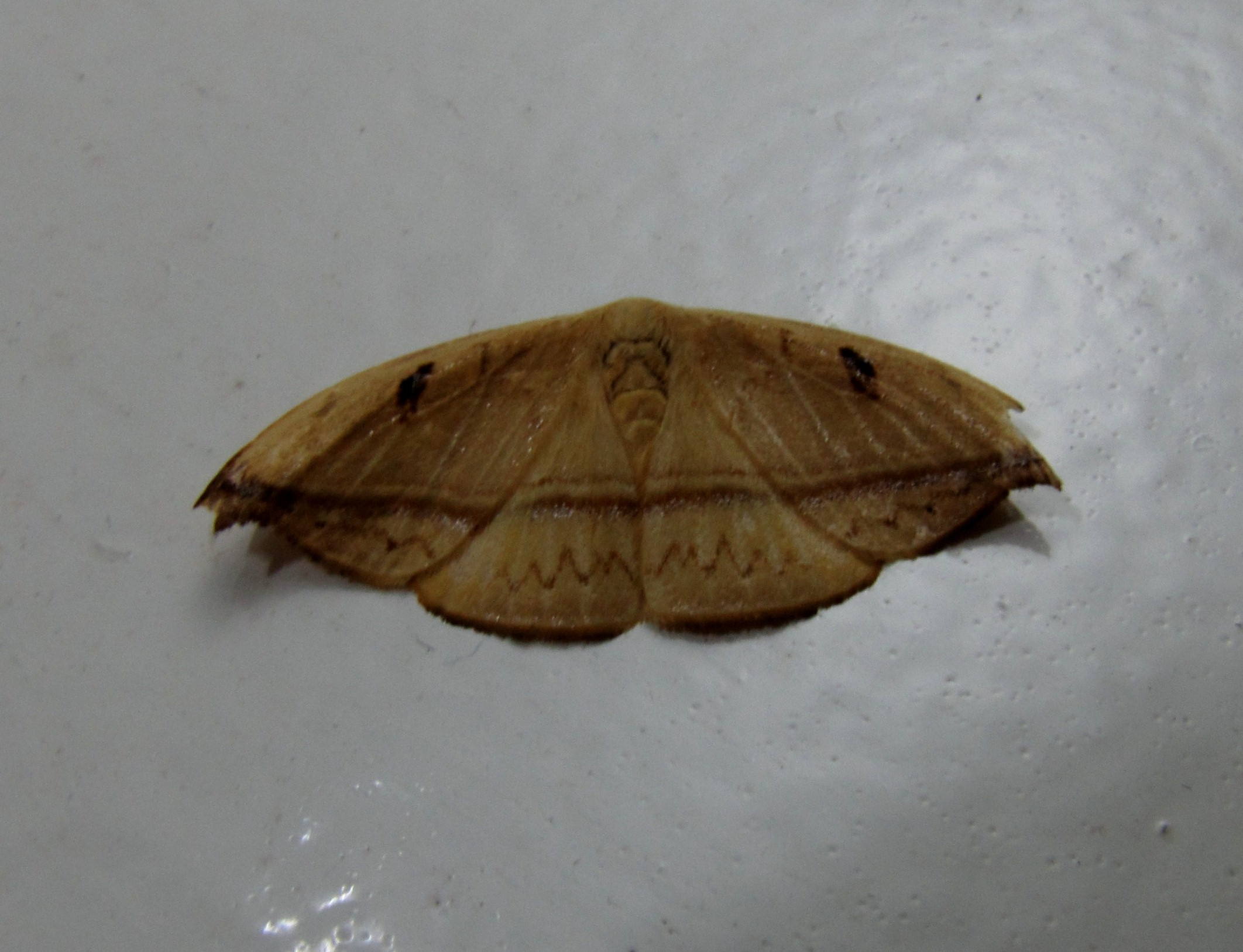

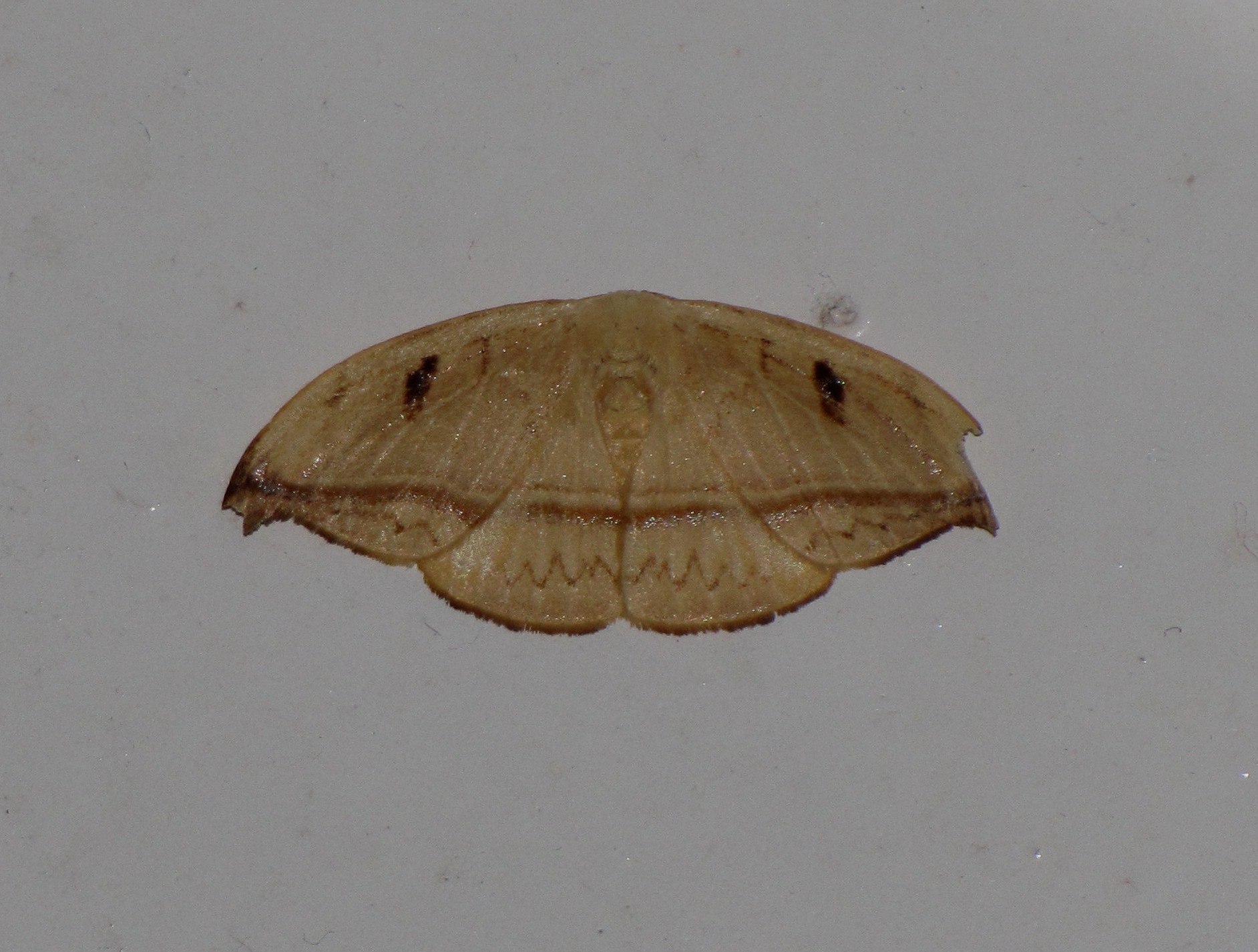

Scientific classification
- Domain: Eukaryota
- Kingdom: Animalia
- Phylum: Arthropoda
- Class: Insecta
- Order: Lepidoptera
- Family: Drepanidae
- Genus: Callidrepana
- Species: C. patrana

Binomial name
- Callidrepana patrana (Moore, [1866])

Synonyms
- Drepana patrana Moore, [1866]; Callidrepana patrana ab. formosana Matsumura, 1921; Callidrepana patrana formosana Inoue, 1955; Callidrepana patrana subbasalis Bryk, 1943; Drepanulides palleolus Motschulsky, 1866; Callidrepana patrana f. crassimaculata Inoue, 1955; Callidrepana patrana ab. simplificaria Strand, 1911

= Callidrepana patrana =

Species of hook-tip moth

Callidrepana patrana is a moth in the family Drepanidae. It was described by Frederic Moore in 1866. It is found in Nepal, India, Cambodia, Sri Lanka, Thailand, mainland China, Japan and Taiwan.

== Description ==
The wingspan is 29–36 mm. Adults have been recorded in April and June. Head fulvous. Thorax and abdomen pale fawn in colour. Wings are pale or dark dawn-colour. Forewings with traces of an ante-medial waved line. Often wanting dark patch on the discocellulars. A double brown line runs from the apex to inner margin beyond the middle. A series of sub-marginal dark specks found on the veins. The area in the cell and below the costa, the veins, the outer edge of the oblique line and the outer margin spangled with brilliant bluish-silver scales. Hindwings have a double straight medial line not reaching the costa. A post-medial series of specks present. Outer edge of the line and outer margin is with silvery scales. The Sri Lankan form is much darker with discocellular patch of the forewing is broken up into three small spots and with more silvery irroration (sprinkles).

The larvae feed on the leaves of Rhus succedanea and Rhus ambigus.

== Subspecies ==
- Callidrepana patrana patrana (north-eastern India, Sri Lanka, northern Myanmar, Taiwan, Laos, China: Szechwan, Yunnan, Fukien, Chekiang)
- Callidrepana patrana palleolus (Motschulsky, 1866) (Japan)
