= Callidrepana ovata =

Scientific classification
- Domain: Eukaryota
- Kingdom: Animalia
- Phylum: Arthropoda
- Class: Insecta
- Order: Lepidoptera
- Family: Drepanidae
- Genus: Callidrepana
- Species: C. ovata

Binomial name
- Callidrepana ovata Watson, 1968

Species of hook-tip moth

Callidrepana ovata is a moth in the family Drepanidae first described by Watson in 1968. It is found in the Chinese provinces of Shaanxi, Hubei and Sichuan.

The length of the forewings is 15.5–19 mm for males and 17.5–22 mm for females.
