= Callidrepana jianfenglingensis =

Scientific classification
- Domain: Eukaryota
- Kingdom: Animalia
- Phylum: Arthropoda
- Class: Insecta
- Order: Lepidoptera
- Family: Drepanidae
- Genus: Callidrepana
- Species: C. jianfenglingensis

Binomial name
- Callidrepana jianfenglingensis Y. Li, Y. Hu & M. Wang, 2014

Species of hook-tip moth

Callidrepana jianfenglingensis is a moth in the family Drepanidae first described by Y. Li, Y. Hu and M. Wang in 2014. It is found in Hainan, China.
