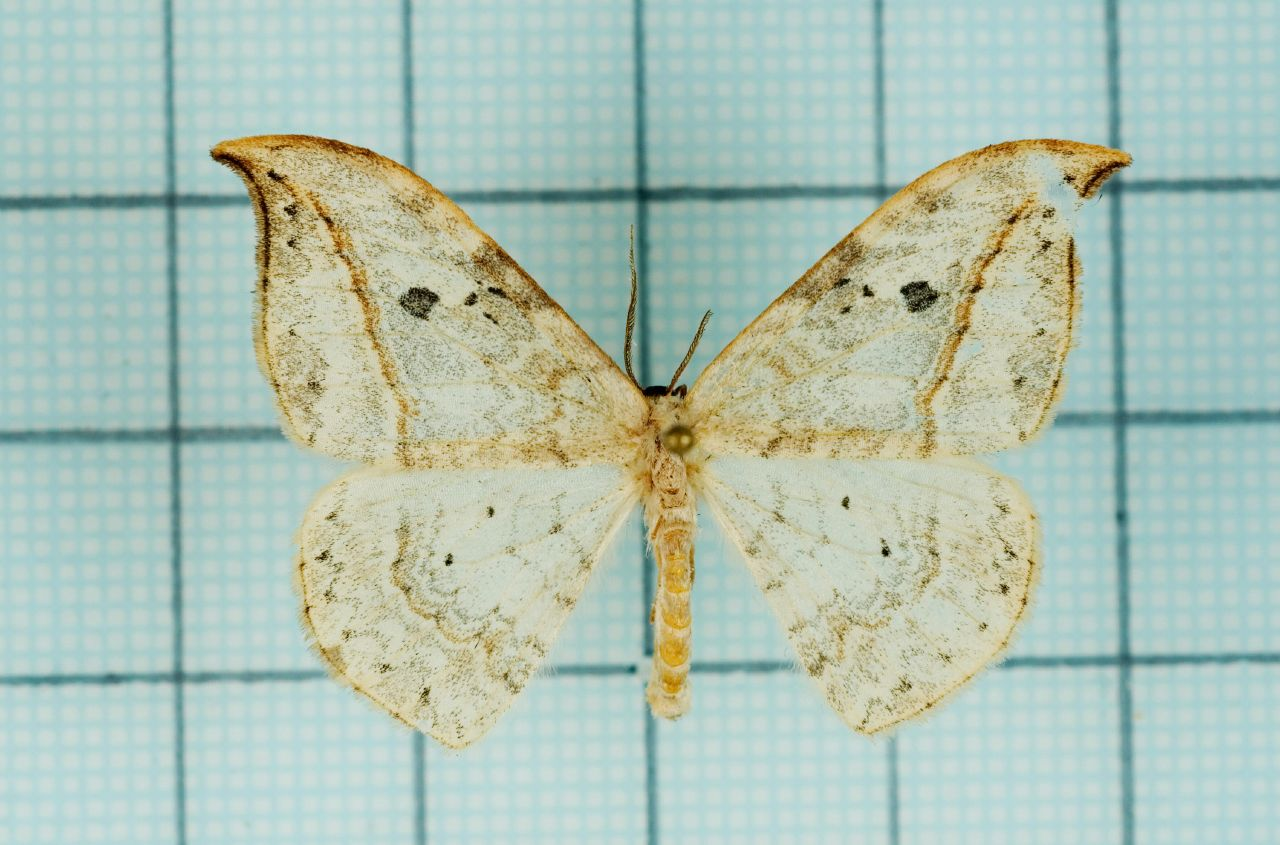

Scientific classification
- Domain: Eukaryota
- Kingdom: Animalia
- Phylum: Arthropoda
- Class: Insecta
- Order: Lepidoptera
- Family: Drepanidae
- Genus: Drepana
- Species: D. pallida

Binomial name
- Drepana pallida Moore, 1879

Synonyms
- Drepana cretacea Hampson, 1914

= Drepana pallida =

Species of hook-tip moth

Drepana pallida is a moth of the family Drepanidae first described by Frederic Moore in 1879. It is found in south-east Asia, from northern India and Myanmar to Vietnam, mainland China and Taiwan.

The length of the forewings is 19–22 mm for males and about 22 mm for females. Adults are pale brown, the forewings with traces of several antemedial lines and a dark spot at the end of the cell. There is an oblique fulvous band from near the apex to the inner margin beyond the middle, slightly bent near the inner margin. There is a series of indistinct submarginal dark specks. The hindwings are similar, but the fulvous band is curved.

== Subspecies ==
- Drepana pallida pallida (north-eastern India, northern Myanmar)
- Drepana pallida cretacea Hampson, 1914 (China: Sichuan, Vietnam)
- Drepana pallida flexuosa Watson, 1968 (China: Fujian, Zhejiang)
- Drepana pallida nicromaculata Okano, 1959 (Taiwan)
