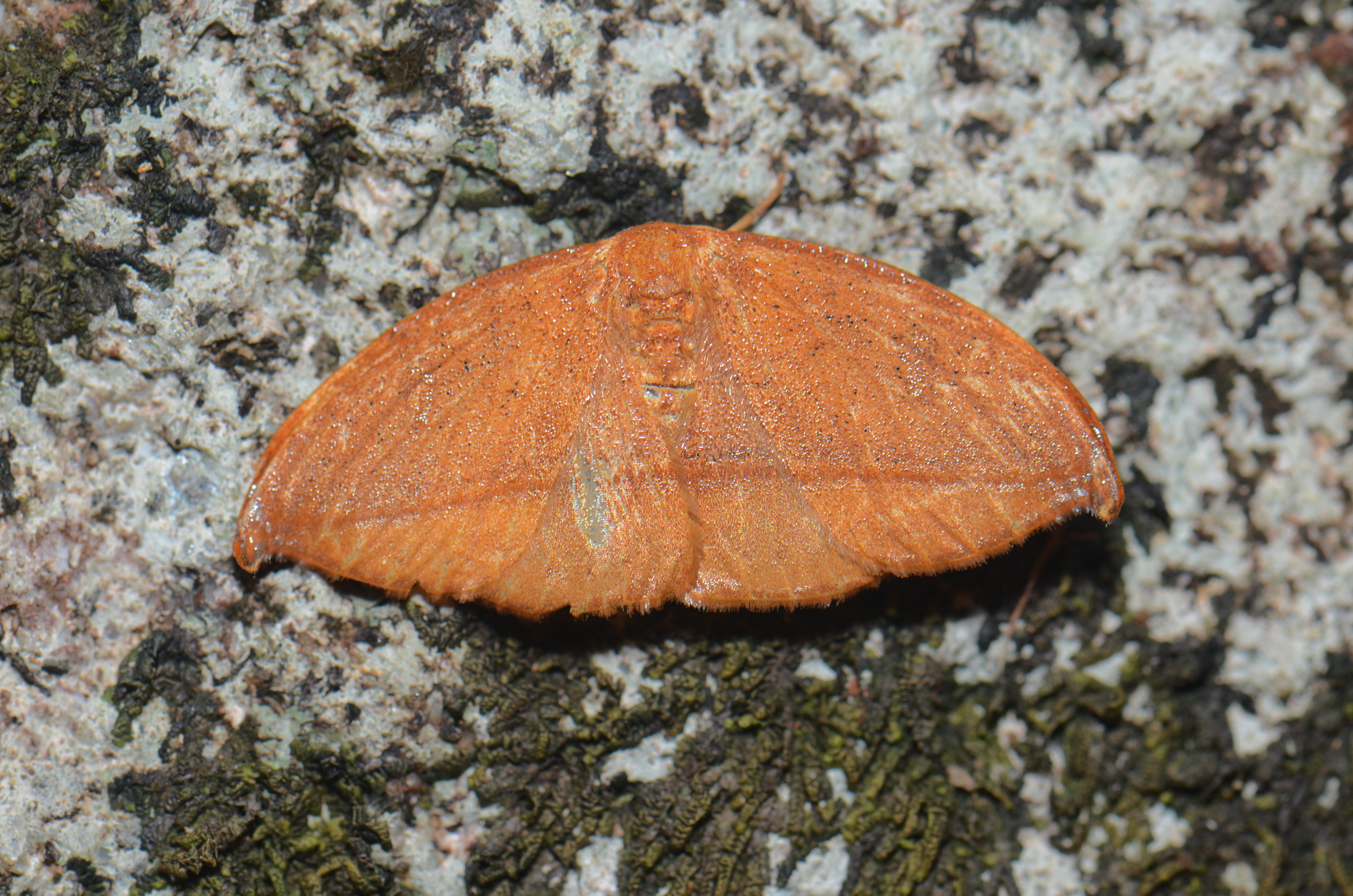

Scientific classification
- Domain: Eukaryota
- Kingdom: Animalia
- Phylum: Arthropoda
- Class: Insecta
- Order: Lepidoptera
- Family: Drepanidae
- Genus: Callidrepana
- Species: C. vanbraeckeli

Binomial name
- Callidrepana vanbraeckeli Gaede, 1934

= Callidrepana vanbraeckeli =

Species of hook-tip moth

Callidrepana vanbraeckeli is a moth in the family Drepanidae first described by Max Gaede in 1934. It is found on Sulawesi, Borneo, Sumatra and Peninsular Malaysia.
