= Callidrepana nana =

Scientific classification
- Domain: Eukaryota
- Kingdom: Animalia
- Phylum: Arthropoda
- Class: Insecta
- Order: Lepidoptera
- Family: Drepanidae
- Genus: Callidrepana
- Species: C. nana

Binomial name
- Callidrepana nana Warren, 1922

Species of hook-tip moth

Callidrepana nana is a moth in the family Drepanidae first described by Warren in 1922. It is found on Peninsular Malaysia and in Singapore and Indonesia (Bangka Island, Sumatra, Borneo).
