= Callidrepana serena =

Scientific classification
- Domain: Eukaryota
- Kingdom: Animalia
- Phylum: Arthropoda
- Class: Insecta
- Order: Lepidoptera
- Family: Drepanidae
- Genus: Callidrepana
- Species: C. serena

Binomial name
- Callidrepana serena Watson, 1965

Species of hook-tip moth

Callidrepana serena is a moth in the family Drepanidae first described by Watson in 1965. It is found in Cameroon, the Central African Republic, the Democratic Republic of the Congo (East Kasai) and Nigeria.

The length of the forewings is 10.5–12 mm for males and 17 mm for females.

== Subspecies ==
- Callidrepana serena serena (Cameroon, Central African Republic, Democratic Republic of Congo)
- Callidrepana serena nigeriensis Watson, 1965 (Nigeria)
