= Callidrepana amaura =

Scientific classification
- Kingdom: Animalia
- Phylum: Arthropoda
- Clade: Pancrustacea
- Class: Insecta
- Order: Lepidoptera
- Family: Drepanidae
- Genus: Callidrepana
- Species: C. amaura

Binomial name
- Callidrepana amaura (Warren, 1901)

Synonyms
- Ausaris amaura Warren, 1901

Species of hook-tip moth

Callidrepana amaura is a moth in the family Drepanidae. It is found in Nigeria.

== Description ==
The female moth's wingspan is about 26 mm. Its forewings are brownish ochreous, darker brownish towards the hindmargin, with all the veins paler. There is a silvery-scaled streak along the costa from the base, becoming subcostal in the outer half of the wing and there is a diffuse brown shade from the base through the cell towards the apex, with a line of silvery scales along its middle. There is also a large brown mulberry-shaped discocellular blotch with some lustrous scales upon it and a smaller dark brown blotch between it and the apex, as well as traces of a dull brown lustrous-edged inner line at one-third, more distinct towards the inner margin. There is a denticulated lustrous line, marked with dark leaden-tinged spots on the veins, from the costa before the apex to the anal angle, preceded by a brown shade and followed by a brown suffusion. The hindwings are paler, with the submarginal lustrous line and brown shades as in the forewings, but not reaching the costa. There are traces of a central brown shade from the inner margin.
