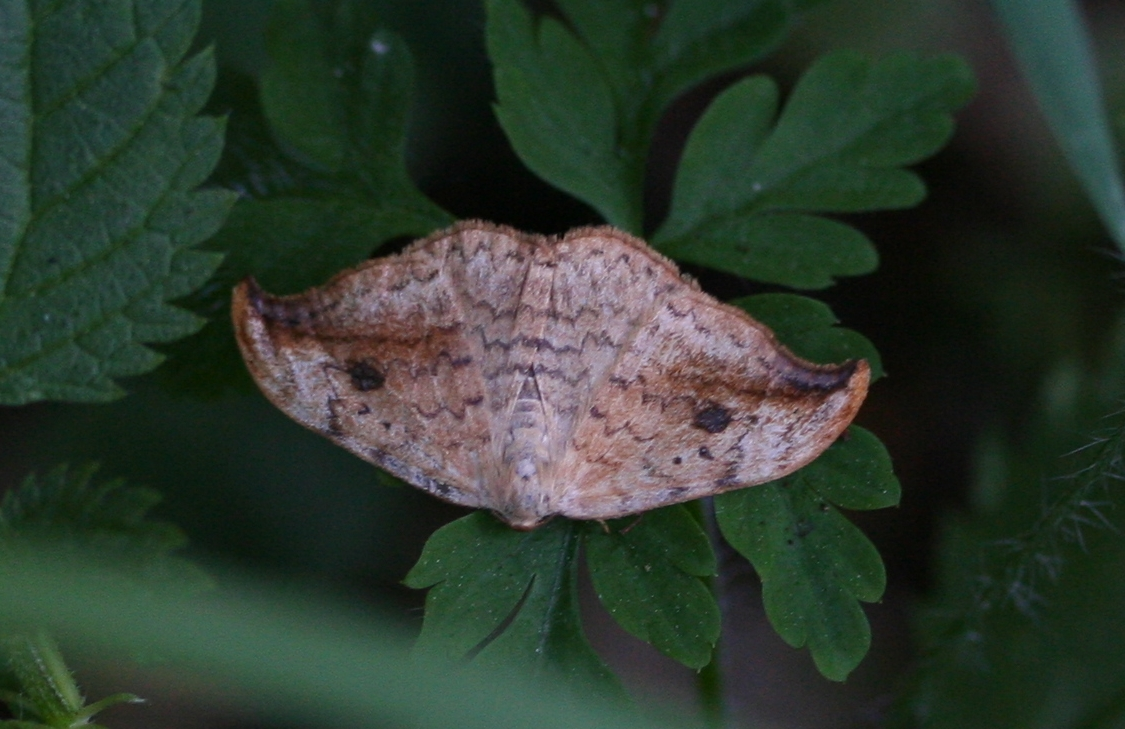

Scientific classification
- Kingdom: Animalia
- Phylum: Arthropoda
- Class: Insecta
- Order: Lepidoptera
- Family: Drepanidae
- Genus: Drepana
- Species: D. falcataria

Binomial name
- Drepana falcataria (Linnaeus, 1758)

Synonyms
- Phalaena falcataria Linnaeus, 1758; Phalaena sicula Denis & Schiffermüller, 1775; Bombyx falcula Denis & Schiffermüller, 1775; Drepana obscura Stauder, 1916; Drepana falcataria var. scotica Bytinski-Salz, 1939

= Drepana falcataria =

Pebble hook-tip

Species of hook-tip moth

Drepana falcataria, the pebble hook-tip, is a moth of the family Drepanidae. The species was first described by Carl Linnaeus in his 1758 10th edition of Systema Naturae. It is found in Europe, through Siberia to the eastern Palearctic.

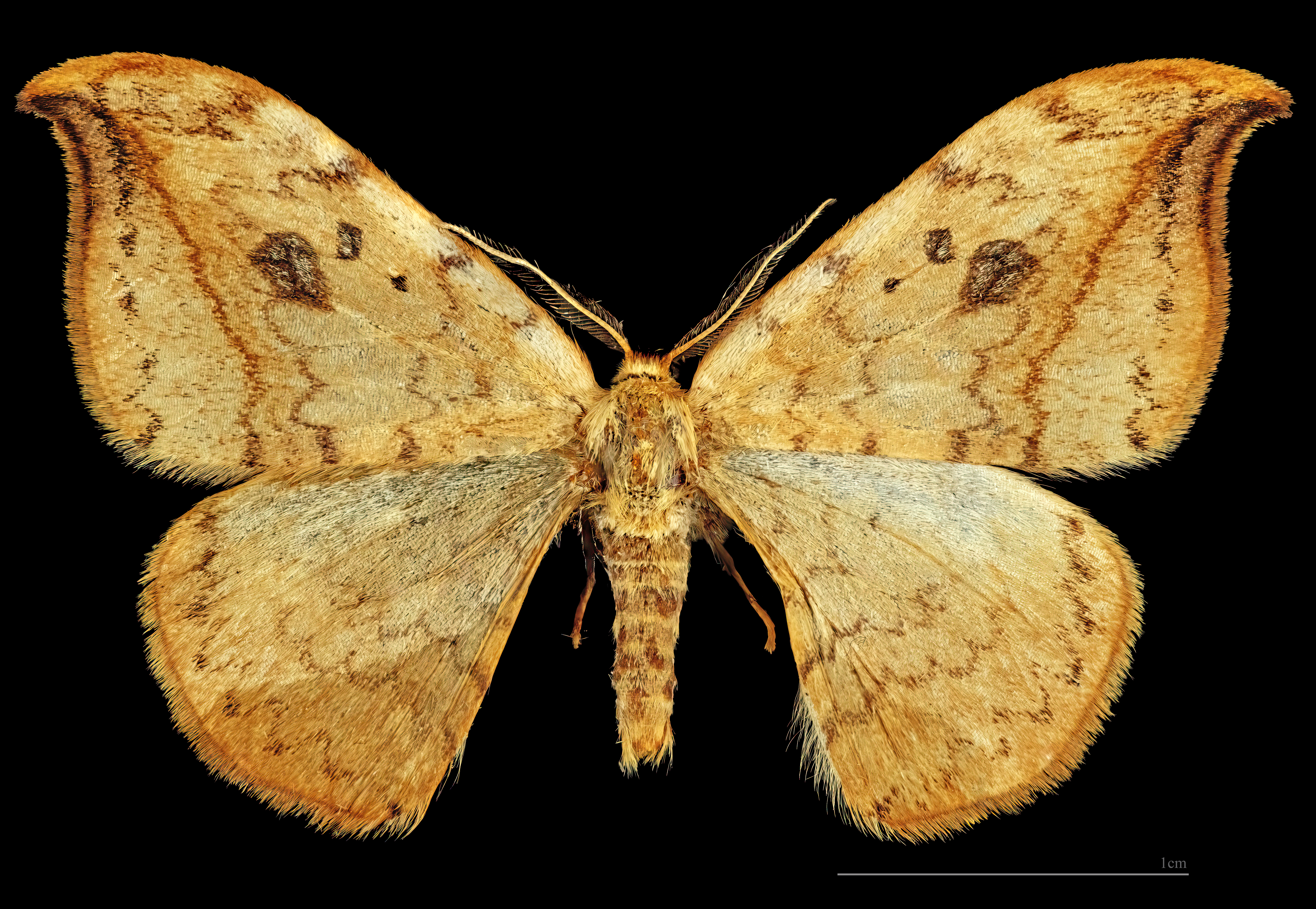
♂

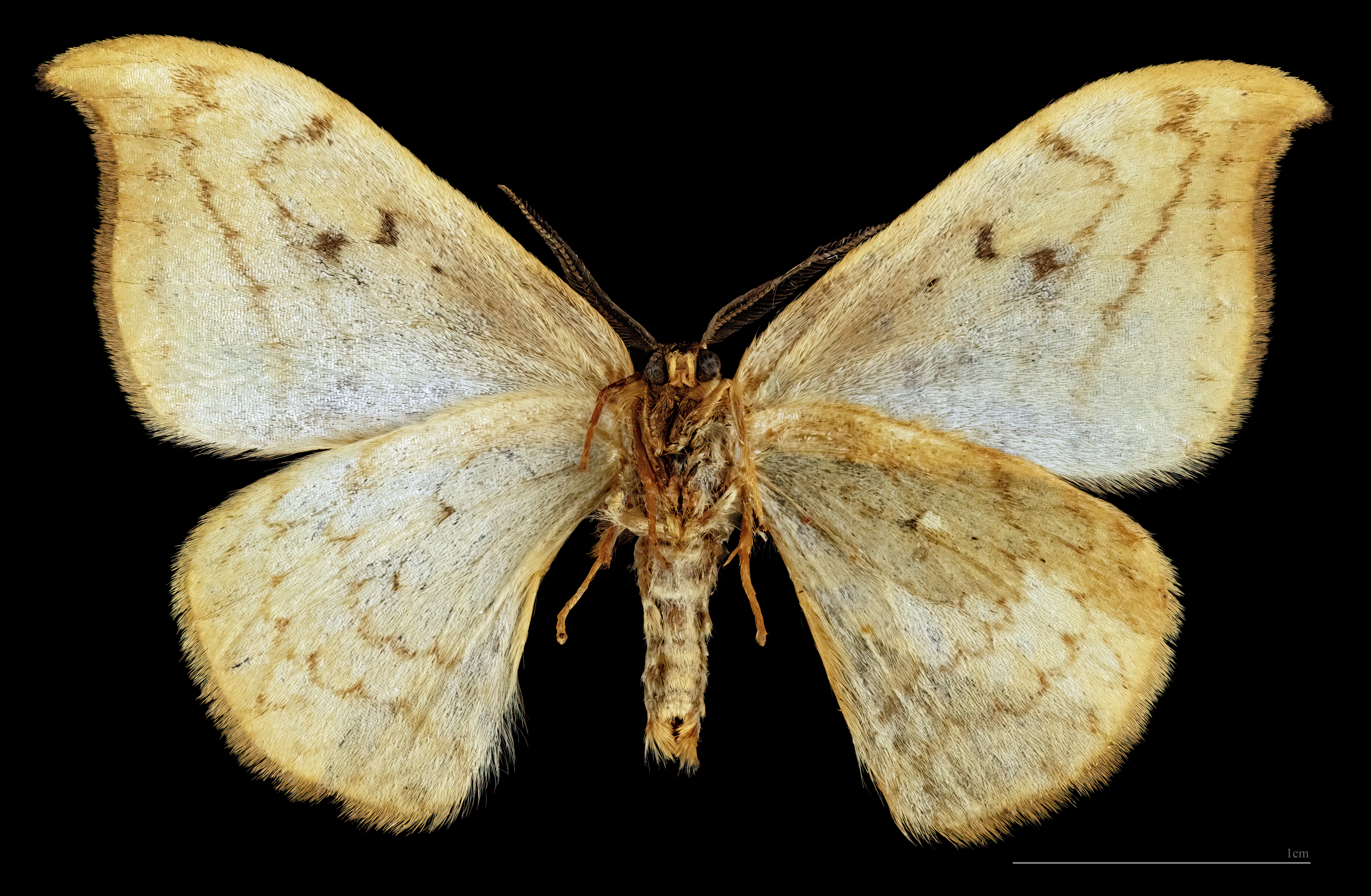
♂ △

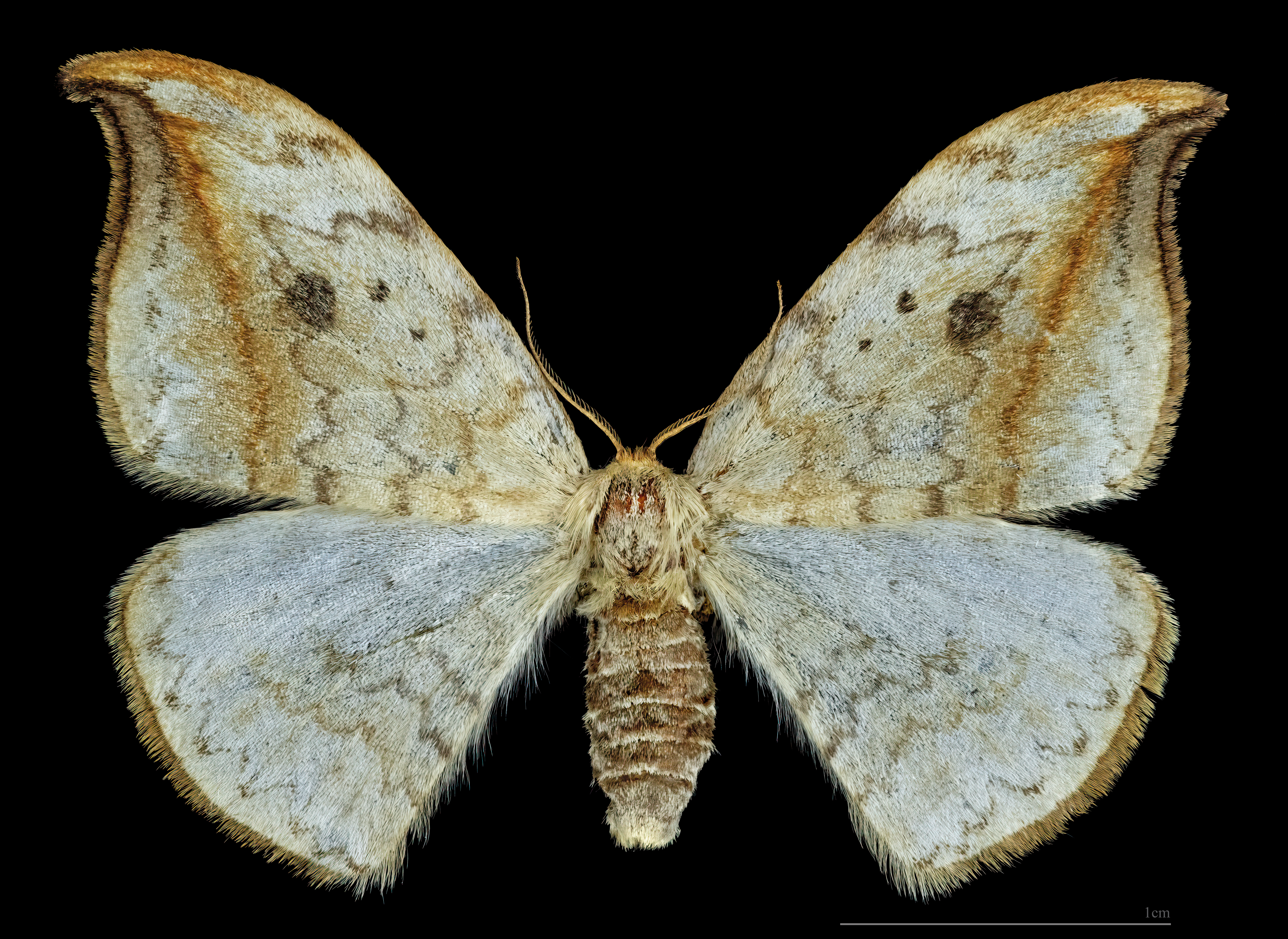
♀

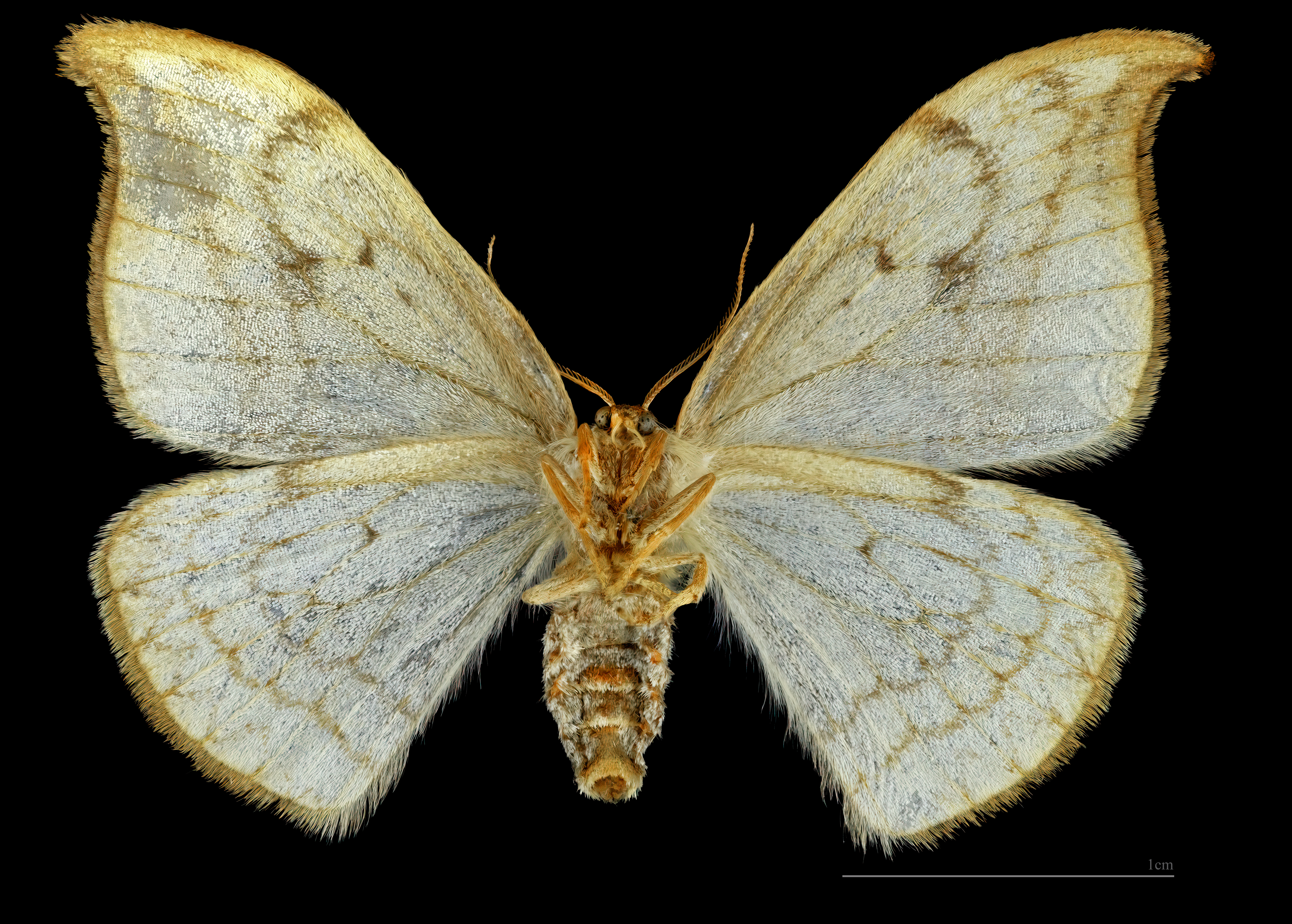
♀ △

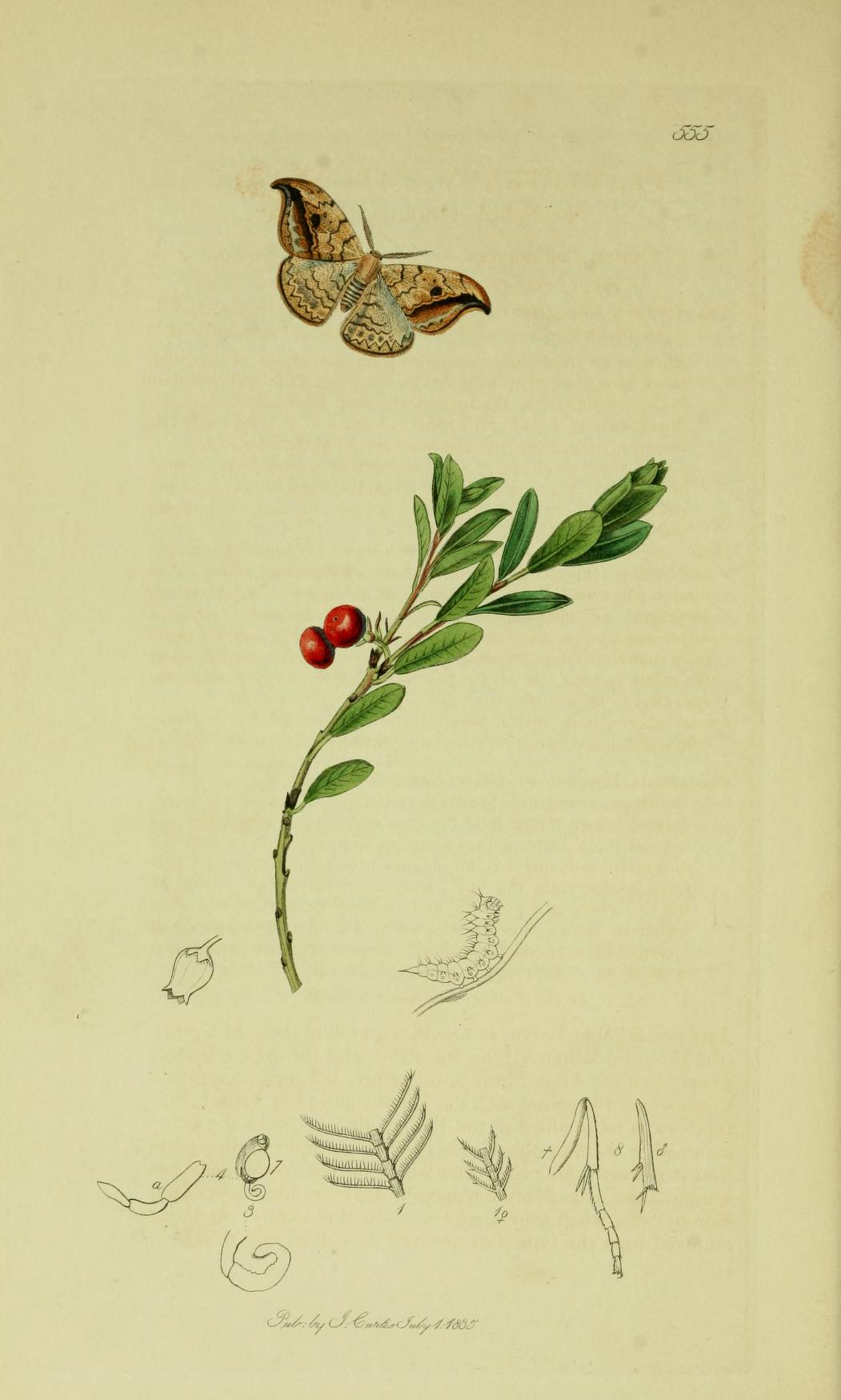
Illustration from John Curtis's British Entomology Volume 6

The wingspan is 27–35 mm. The ground colour is light brown or white brown to reddish brown. The forewings, which exhibit a fine regular pattern of dark, finely serrated lines have a dark patch in the middle. Under the sickle, or on the outer part of the outer edge of the wing, there is a purple stain. From the wing tip, a clearly curved, dark brown band runs under the stain up to the edge of the wing. The hindwings are also light brown, but brighter than the forewings. Their pattern is similar to but not so strong as that of the forewings. In the females the hindwings are white with the same dark patterning.

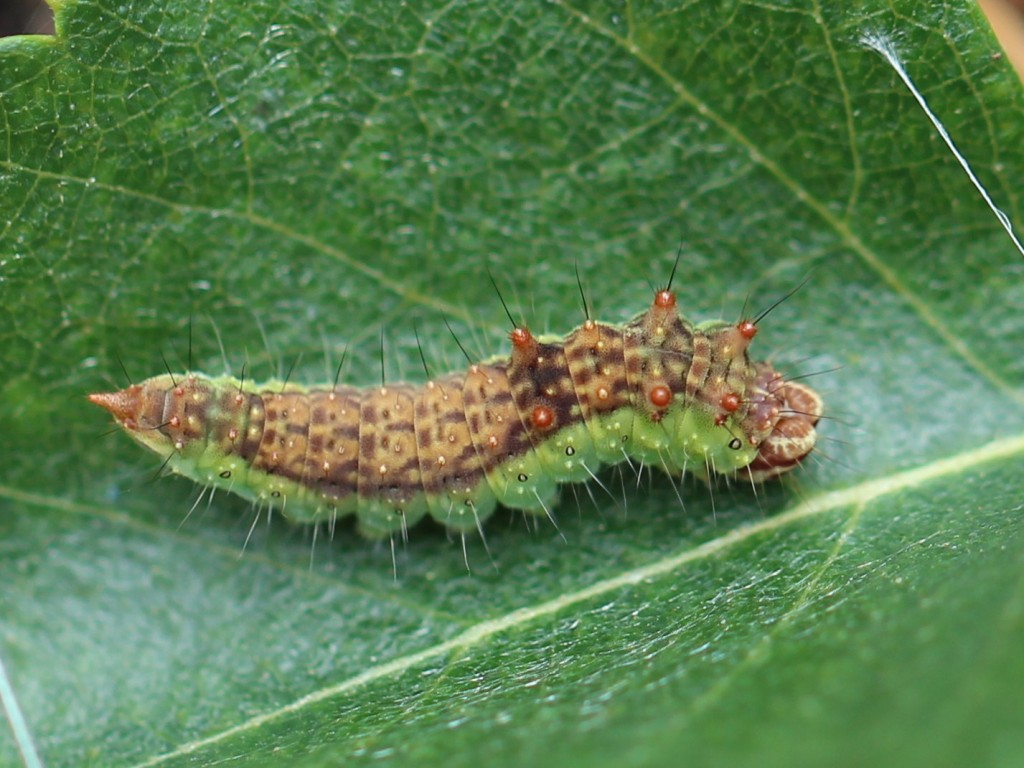
larva

The egg is yellow marked with orange at one end. The last instar caterpillar is green, the dorsum reddish brown, except towards the black-marked yellowish head. There are two conspicuous warts on rings two and five, and less obvious raised spots on the other rings, all bearing hairs. In the younger stages it is blackish, with white marks on the fourth and seventh rings; later it becomes greenish below, and the markings on the back of rings four, seven, eight, and ten are whitish or creamy.

They prefer riparian forest and carr but are also found on the edge of moors and in parks and gardens. They are widespread and common. The moth flies from April to August depending on the location.

The larvae feed on birch and sometimes alder.
