= Callidrepana macnultyi =

Scientific classification
- Domain: Eukaryota
- Kingdom: Animalia
- Phylum: Arthropoda
- Class: Insecta
- Order: Lepidoptera
- Family: Drepanidae
- Genus: Callidrepana
- Species: C. macnultyi

Binomial name
- Callidrepana macnultyi Watson, 1965

Species of hook-tip moth

Callidrepana macnultyi is a moth in the family Drepanidae first described by Watson in 1965. It is found in the Central African Republic, the Democratic Republic of the Congo (Orientale) and Nigeria.

The length of the forewings is 10.5–12 mm for males and 17 mm for females.
