= Callidrepana argyrobapta =

Scientific classification
- Kingdom: Animalia
- Phylum: Arthropoda
- Class: Insecta
- Order: Lepidoptera
- Family: Drepanidae
- Genus: Callidrepana
- Species: C. argyrobapta

Binomial name
- Callidrepana argyrobapta (Gaede, 1914)

Synonyms
- Drepanula argyrobapta Gaede, 1914

Species of hook-tip moth

Callidrepana argyrobapta is a moth in the family Drepanidae first described by Max Gaede in 1914. It is found in Cameroon.
