= Drepana rufofasciata =

Scientific classification
- Kingdom: Animalia
- Phylum: Arthropoda
- Class: Insecta
- Order: Lepidoptera
- Family: Drepanidae
- Genus: Drepana
- Species: D. rufofasciata

Binomial name
- Drepana rufofasciata Hampson, [1893]

Species of hook-tip moth

Drepana rufofasciata is a moth in the family Drepanidae. It was described by George Hampson in 1893. It is found in Sikkim in India and Tibet in China.

The wingspan is 43 mm. The forewings are pale brown, with a broad median rufous band occupying half of the wing and bearing two white spots on the costa, from which indistinct pale waved lines proceed to the inner margin. There is a grey-centered dark spot at the lower angle of the cell. There is a submarginal series of black specks. The hindwings are pale brown, with traces of two antemedial pale lines, a black speck at the end of the cell and three postmedial waved lines.
