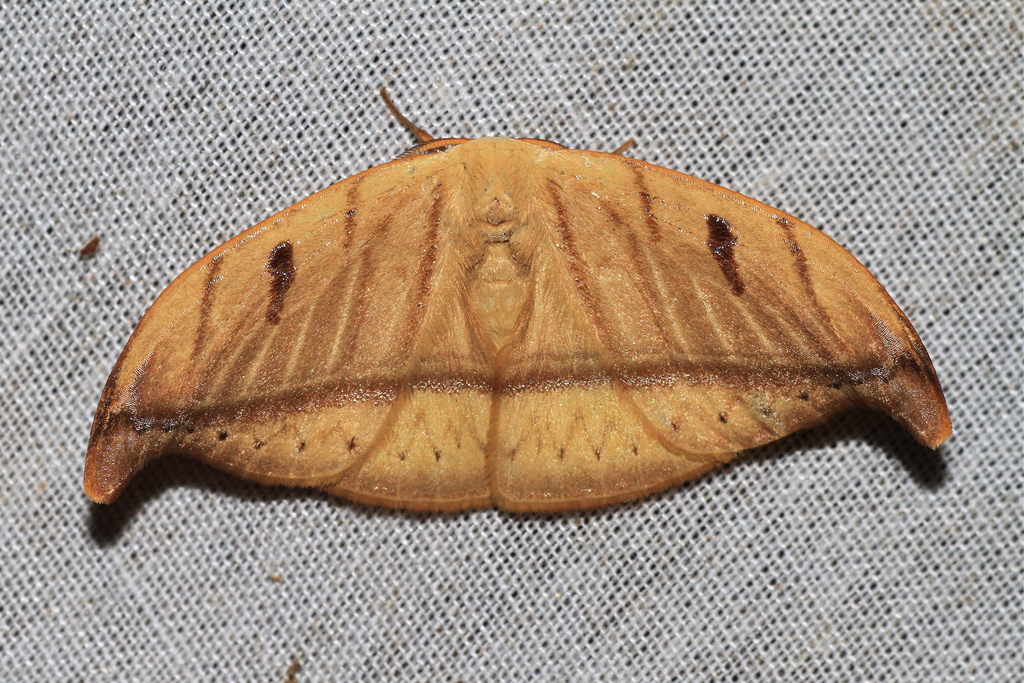
- Callidrepana argenteola from Borneo

Scientific classification
- Domain: Eukaryota
- Kingdom: Animalia
- Phylum: Arthropoda
- Class: Insecta
- Order: Lepidoptera
- Family: Drepanidae
- Subfamily: Drepaninae
- Genus: Callidrepana; Felder, 1861

Synonyms
- Damna Walker, [1863]; Ausaris Walker, [1863]; Ticilia Walker, 1865; Drepanulides Motschulsky, 1866; Drepanula Gaede, 1914; Drepanulina Gaede, 1927

= Callidrepana =

Genus of moths

Callidrepana is a genus of moths belonging to the subfamily Drepaninae.

== Species ==
- Callidrepana albiceris (Swinhoe, 1907)
- Callidrepana amaura (Warren, 1901)
- Callidrepana argenteola (Moore, [1860])
- Callidrepana argyrobapta (Gaede, 1914)
- Callidrepana gelidata (Walker, [1863])
- Callidrepana gemina Watson, 1968
- Callidrepana heinzhuebneri Buchsbaum, Brüggemeier & Chen, 2014
- Callidrepana hirayamai Nagano, 1918
- Callidrepana jianfenglingensis Li, Hu & Wang, 2014
- Callidrepana macnultyi Watson, 1965
- Callidrepana micacea (Walker, 1862)
- Callidrepana nana Warren, 1922
- Callidrepana ovata Watson, 1968
- Callidrepana patrana (Moore, [1866])
- Callidrepana pulcherrima (Hampson, [1893])
- Callidrepana saucia Felder, 1861
- Callidrepana serena Watson, 1965
- Callidrepana splendens (Warren, 1897)
- Callidrepana vanbraeckeli Gaede, 1934
