= Callidrepana heinzhuebneri =

Scientific classification
- Kingdom: Animalia
- Phylum: Arthropoda
- Clade: Pancrustacea
- Class: Insecta
- Order: Lepidoptera
- Family: Drepanidae
- Genus: Callidrepana
- Species: C. heinzhuebneri

Binomial name
- Callidrepana heinzhuebneri Buchsbaum, Brüggemeier & Chen, 2014

Species of hook-tip moth

Callidrepana heinzhuebneri is a moth in the family Drepanidae. It was first described by Ulf Buchsbaum, Frank Brüggemeier and Mei-Yu Chen in 2014. It is found in Laos.

The wingspan is 20–22 mm for males and 25–27 mm for females.
