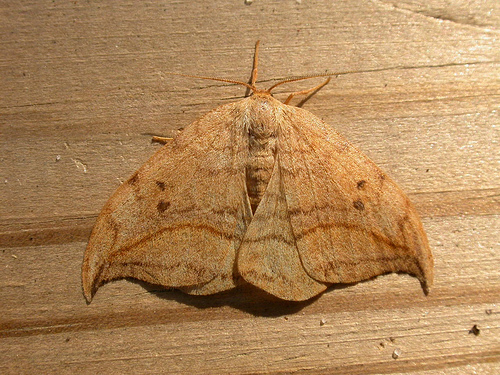

Scientific classification
- Kingdom: Animalia
- Phylum: Arthropoda
- Class: Insecta
- Order: Lepidoptera
- Family: Drepanidae
- Genus: Drepana
- Species: D. curvatula

Binomial name
- Drepana curvatula (Borkhausen, 1790)

Synonyms
- Phalaena curvatula Borkhausen, 1790; Drepana curvatula f. gaedei Bytinski-Salz, 1939; Drepana curvatula knechteli Daniel, 1963; Drepana acuta Butler, 1881; Drepana curvatula japonibia Strand, 1911; Drepana curvatula urupula Bryk, 1942; Dreapana curvatula koreula Bryk, 1942

= Drepana curvatula =

Dusky hook-tip

Species of hook-tip moth

Drepana curvatula, the dusky hook-tip, is a moth of the family Drepanidae. It was first described by Moritz Balthasar Borkhausen in 1790 and it is found from Europe to Japan.

The wingspan is 34–42 mm. The moth flies from May to August depending on the location.

The larvae feed on alder, oak and birch.

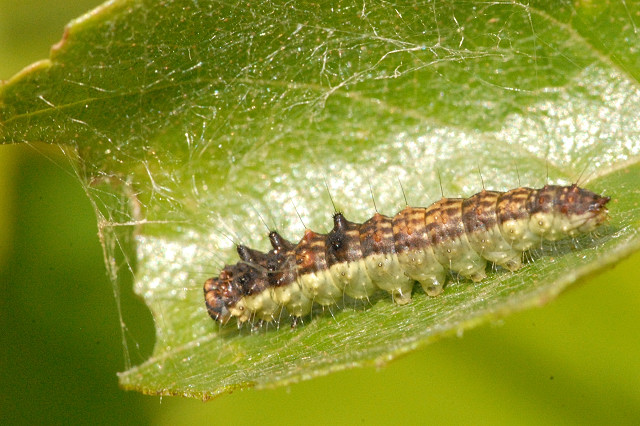
Caterpillar

== Subspecies ==
- Drepana curvatula curvatula (Europe)
- Drepana curvatula acuta Butler, 1881 (Japan, south-eastern Russia, Kuril Islands, Korea, China: Manchuria)
