= Callidrepana splendens =

Scientific classification
- Domain: Eukaryota
- Kingdom: Animalia
- Phylum: Arthropoda
- Class: Insecta
- Order: Lepidoptera
- Family: Drepanidae
- Genus: Callidrepana
- Species: C. splendens

Binomial name
- Callidrepana splendens (Warren, 1897)

Synonyms
- Ausaris splendens Warren, 1897

Species of hook-tip moth

Callidrepana splendens is a moth in the family Drepanidae first described by Warren in 1897. It is found on Peninsular Malaysia and in Indonesia (Sulawesi, Sula Islands, Borneo, Sumatra, Timor).

The wingspan is about 20 mm. The forewings are cream coloured, tinged with olive and the costa is darker, suffused throughout with silvery scales. The cell-spot is large, ear shaped, dark chestnut and edged with silvery scales. There is a blotch of silvery scales at the base of the cell, with a line of the same colour along the middle of cell, through, the cell-spot, and broadening beyond it. There is also a silvery submarginal line, incurved at the middle, then parallel to the hindmargin. The marginal line is silvery and the fringe and costal edge before the apex are fulvous. The submarginal line is edged internally with olive fulvous. The hindwings have a short silvery line from the inner margin at two-thirds and the marginal line is silvery below the middle. The fringe is fulvous.
