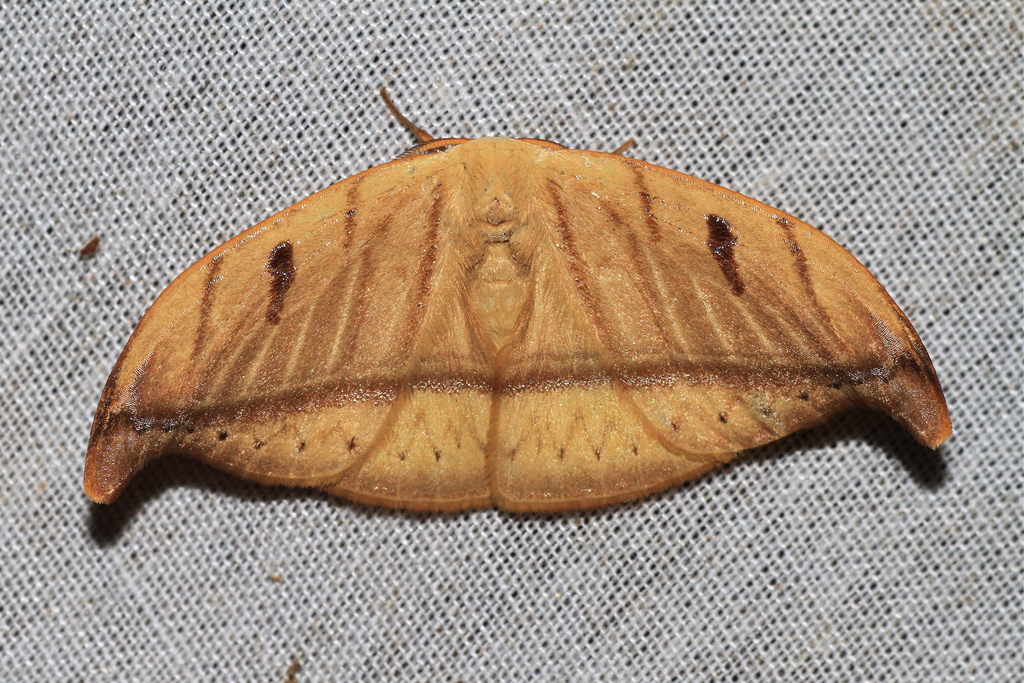

Scientific classification
- Domain: Eukaryota
- Kingdom: Animalia
- Phylum: Arthropoda
- Class: Insecta
- Order: Lepidoptera
- Family: Drepanidae
- Genus: Callidrepana
- Species: C. argenteola

Binomial name
- Callidrepana argenteola (Moore, [1860])

Synonyms
- Drepana argenteola Moore, [1860]; Drepana bracteata Hampson, 1893; Callidrepana dialitha West, 1932; Callidrepana bracteata celebensis Warren, 1922

= Callidrepana argenteola =

Species of hook-tip moth

Callidrepana argenteola is a moth in the family Drepanidae first described by Frederic Moore in 1860. It is found from the Oriental tropics to Taiwan, the Philippines, Sulawesi and Timor. The habitat consists of lowland forests.

The wingspan is about 54 mm.

The larvae feed on Mangifera species.

== Subspecies ==
- Callidrepana argenteola argenteola
- Callidrepana argenteola celebensis Warren, 1922 (Sulawesi)
- Callidrepana argenteola dialitha West, 1932 (Philippines)
