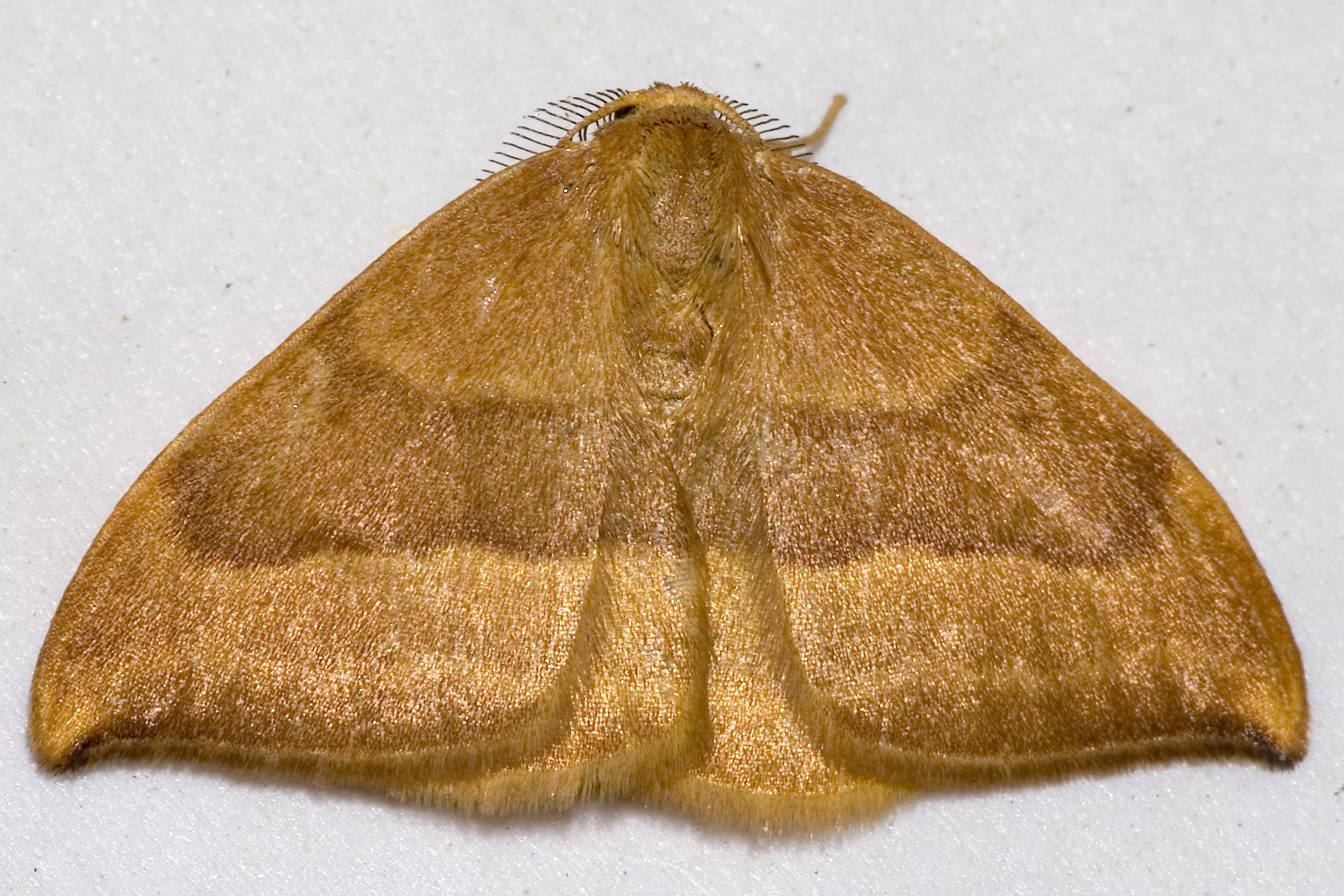

Scientific classification
- Domain: Eukaryota
- Kingdom: Animalia
- Phylum: Arthropoda
- Class: Insecta
- Order: Lepidoptera
- Family: Drepanidae
- Genus: Drepana
- Species: D. cultraria

Binomial name
- Drepana cultraria (Fabricius, 1775)

Synonyms
- Phalaena cultraria Fabricius, 1775; Bombyx sicula Esper, 1786; Drepana unguicola Hübner, 1803; Drepana minor Fuchs, 1884

= Drepana cultraria =

Species of hook-tip moth

Drepana cultraria, the barred hook-tip, is a moth of the family Drepanidae and part of Drepana subgenus Watsonalla. It is found in southern and central Europe.

Barred hook-tip on common bugle

The wingspan is 20–28 mm. The moth flies from May to August depending on the location.

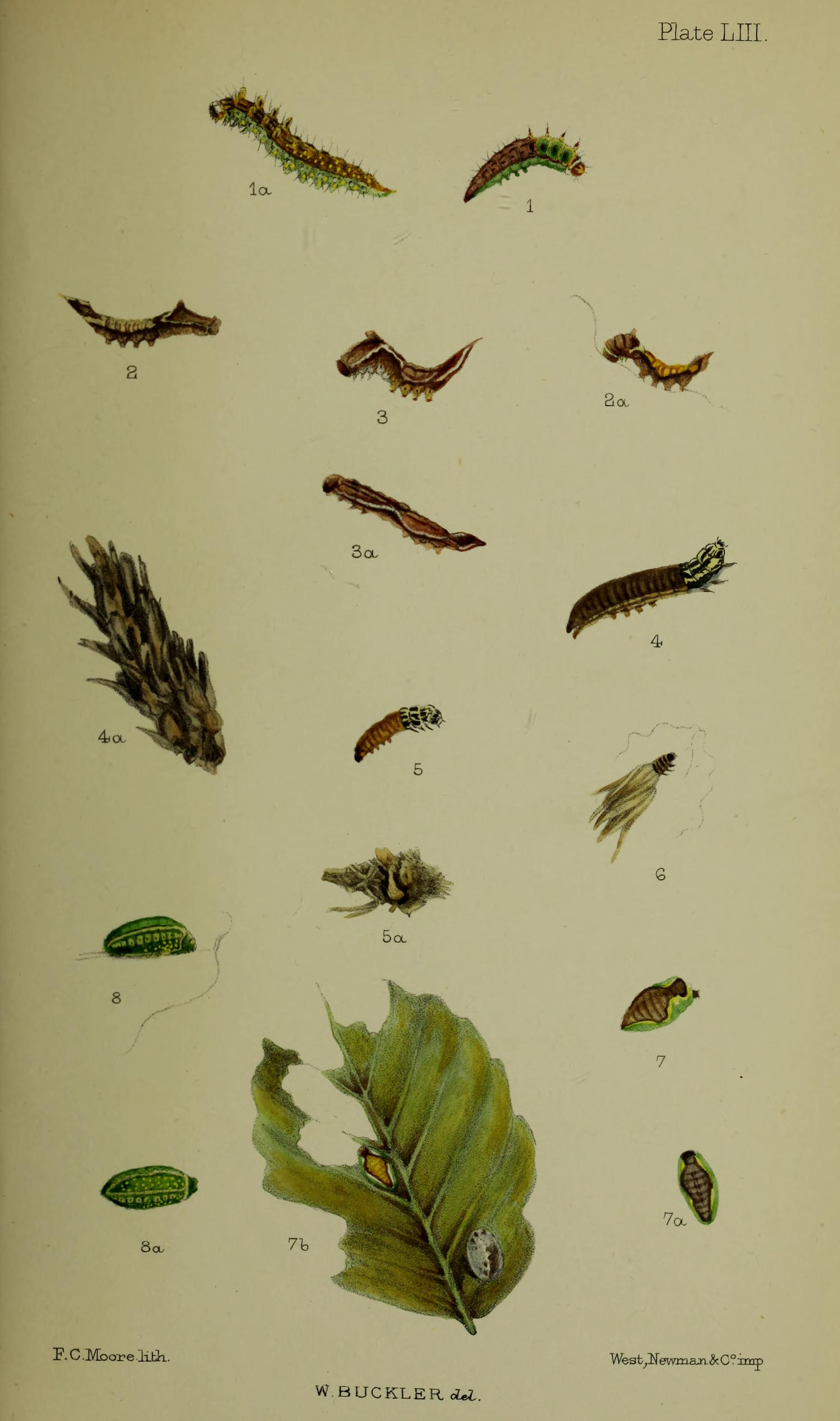
Figs. 3. 3a larva after last moult

The larvae feed on Fagus species.
