= Callidrepana micacea =

Scientific classification
- Kingdom: Animalia
- Phylum: Arthropoda
- Class: Insecta
- Order: Lepidoptera
- Family: Drepanidae
- Genus: Callidrepana
- Species: C. micacea

Binomial name
- Callidrepana micacea (Walker, 1862)

Synonyms
- Drepana micacea Walker, 1862; Drepana biocularis Moore, 1879; Ausaris fulvilauta Warren, 1897; Callidrepana pilana Swinhoe, 1905

Species of hook-tip moth

Callidrepana micacea is a moth in the family Drepanidae first described by Francis Walker in 1862. It is found in the north-eastern Himalayas, on the Andamans, Peninsular Malaysia, Sumatra, Borneo, the Philippines and Sulawesi.

The wingspan is about 40 mm. The upper half of the hindwings, including the entire cell, is whitish. Otherwise the entire colouration of the body and wings is very uniform dark ochreous, covered with very minute iridescent white scales, and on the middle of the forewings some black dots. A straight dark orange line runs from below the middle of the abdominal margin of the hindwings to near the falcated (sickle-shaped) apex of the forewings and there is an indistinct indication of a dentated orange submarginal line on both wings and a dark marginal line and cilia.

The larvae feed on Bruguiera species.
