= List of Uloboridae species =

This page lists all described species of the spider family Uloboridae accepted by the World Spider Catalog as of February 2021:

== A ==
=== Ariston ===
Ariston O. Pickard-Cambridge, 1896

- A. aglasices Salvatierra, Tourinho & Brescovit, 2014 — Mexico
- A. albicans O. Pickard-Cambridge, 1896 (type) — Mexico to Panama
- A. aristus Opell, 1979 — Panama
- A. mazolus Opell, 1979 — Mexico
- A. spartanus Salvatierra, Tourinho & Brescovit, 2014 — Brazil

=== Astavakra ===
Astavakra Lehtinen, 1967

- A. sexmucronata (Simon, 1893) (type) — Philippines

== B ==
=== † Bicalamistrum ===
† Bicalamistrum Wunderlich, 2015

=== † Burmasuccinus ===
† Burmasuccinus Wunderlich, 2018

=== † Burmuloborus ===
† Burmuloborus Wunderlich, 2008

== C ==
=== Conifaber ===
Conifaber Opell, 1982

- C. guarani Grismado, 2004 — Paraguay, Argentina
- C. manicoba Salvatierra, Brescovit & Tourinho, 2017 — Brazil
- C. parvus Opell, 1982 (type) — Colombia
- C. yasi Grismado, 2004 — Argentina

== D ==
=== Daramulunia ===
Daramulunia Lehtinen, 1967

- D. gibbosa (L. Koch, 1872) (type) — Samoa
- D. tenella (L. Koch, 1872) — Vanuatu, Fiji, Samoa

== E ==
=== † Eomiagrammopes ===
† Eomiagrammopes Wunderlich, 2004

== F ==
=== † Furculoborus ===
† Furculoborus Wunderlich, 2017

== H ==
=== † Hyptiomopes ===
† Hyptiomopes Wunderlich, 2004

=== Hyptiotes ===
Hyptiotes

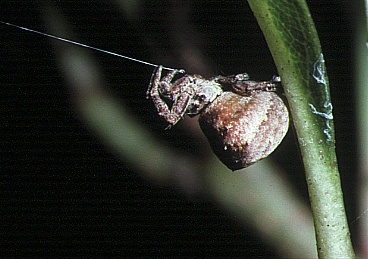
Hyptiotes affinis, female

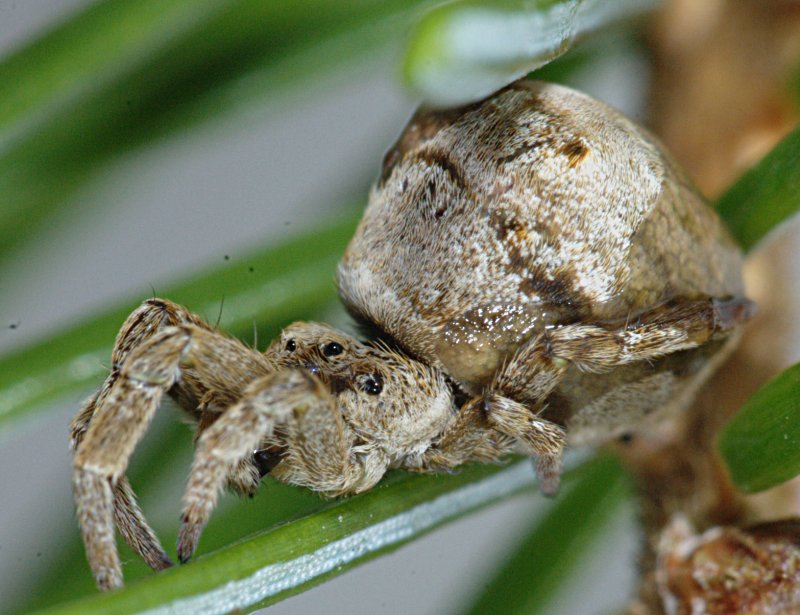
Hyptiotes paradoxus

Hyptiotes Walckenaer, 1837

- H. affinis Bösenberg & Strand, 1906 — India, China, Korea, Taiwan, Japan
- H. akermani Wiehle, 1964 — South Africa
- H. analis Simon, 1892 — Sri Lanka
- H. cavatus (Hentz, 1847) — USA, Canada
- H. dentatus Wunderlich, 2008 — France
- H. fabaceus Dong, Zhu & Yoshida, 2005 — China
- H. flavidus (Blackwall, 1862) — Madeira, Mediterranean, Russia (Europe), Caucasus
- H. gerhardti Wiehle, 1929 — Greece, southern Russia
- H. gertschi Chamberlin & Ivie, 1935 — USA, Canada
- H. himalayensis Tikader, 1981 — India
- H. indicus Simon, 1905 — India
- H. paradoxus (C. L. Koch, 1834) (type) — Europe, Turkey, Caucasus
- H. puebla Muma & Gertsch, 1964 — USA, Mexico
- H. solanus Dong, Zhu & Yoshida, 2005 — China
- H. tehama Muma & Gertsch, 1964 — USA
- H. xinlongensis Liu, Wang & Peng, 1991 — China

== J ==
=== † Jerseyuloborus ===
† Jerseyuloborus Wunderlich, 2011

== K ==
=== † Kachin ===
† Kachin Wunderlich, 2017

== L ==
=== Lubinella ===
Lubinella Opell, 1984

- L. morobensis Opell, 1984 (type) — New Guinea

=== Lehtineniana ===
Lehtineniana Sherwood, 2022

- L. beattyi Opell, 1983 — Caroline Is.
- L. dissimilis Berland, 1924 — Vanuatu, New Caledonia
- L. pukapukan Salvatierra, Brescovit & Tourinho, 2015 — Cook Is.
- L. tahitiensis Berland, 1934 (type) — French Polynesia (Marquesas Is., Society Is., Austral Is.)
- L. vaka Salvatierra, Tourinho & Brescovit, 2015 — Cook Is.

== M ==
=== Miagrammopes ===
Miagrammopes

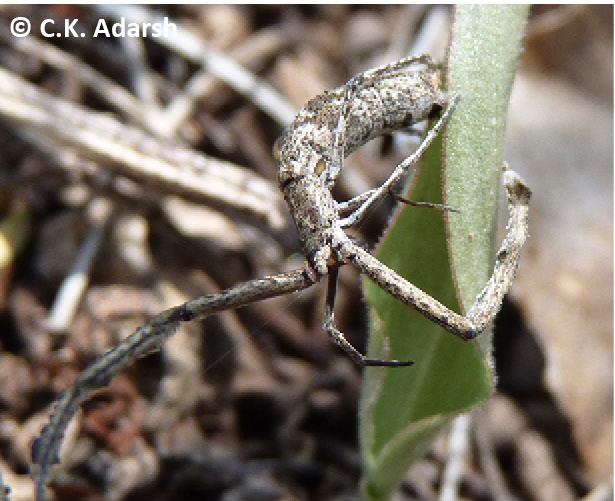
Miagrammopes extensus

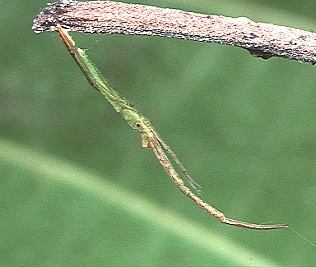
Miagrammopes oblongus, male

Miagrammopes O. Pickard-Cambridge, 1870

- M. albocinctus Simon, 1893 — Venezuela
- M. alboguttatus F. O. Pickard-Cambridge, 1902 — Guatemala to Panama
- M. albomaculatus Thorell, 1891 — India (Nicobar Is.)
- M. animotus Chickering, 1968 — Puerto Rico
- M. apostrophus Sen, Saha & Raychaudhuri, 2013 — India
- M. aspinatus Chickering, 1968 — Panama
- M. auriventer Schenkel, 1953 — Venezuela
- M. bambusicola Simon, 1893 — Venezuela
- M. bifurcatus Dong, Yan, Zhu & Song, 2004 — China
- M. birabeni Mello-Leitão, 1945 — Argentina
- M. biroi Kulczyński, 1908 — New Guinea
- M. bradleyi O. Pickard-Cambridge, 1874 — Australia (New South Wales)
- M. brasiliensis Roewer, 1951 — Brazil
- M. brevicaudus O. Pickard-Cambridge, 1882 — South Africa
- M. brevior Kulczyński, 1908 — New Guinea
- M. brooksptensis Barrion & Litsinger, 1995 — Philippines
- M. cambridgei Thorell, 1887 — Myanmar, Indonesia (Sumatra)
- M. caudatus Keyserling, 1890 — Australia (Queensland)
- M. ciliatus Petrunkevitch, 1926 — Puerto Rico, St. Vincent
- M. constrictus Purcell, 1904 — South Africa
- M. corticeus Simon, 1893 — Venezuela
- M. cubanus Banks, 1909 — Cuba
- M. extensus Simon, 1889 — India
- M. fasciatus Rainbow, 1916 — Australia (Queensland)
- M. ferdinandi O. Pickard-Cambridge, 1870 — Sri Lanka
- M. flavus (Wunderlich, 1976) — Australia (Queensland)
- M. gravelyi Tikader, 1971 — India
- M. grodnitskyi Logunov, 2018 — Vietnam
- M. gulliveri Butler, 1876 — Mauritius (Rodriguez)
- M. guttatus Mello-Leitão, 1937 — Brazil, Argentina
- M. indicus Tikader, 1971 — India
- M. intempus Chickering, 1968 — Panama
- M. kinabalu Logunov, 2018 — Malaysia (Borneo)
- M. kirkeensis Tikader, 1971 — India
- M. larundus Chickering, 1968 — Panama
- M. latens Bryant, 1936 — Cuba, Hispaniola
- M. lehtineni (Wunderlich, 1976) — Australia (Queensland)
- M. licinus Chickering, 1968 — Panama
- M. longicaudus O. Pickard-Cambridge, 1882 — South Africa
- M. luederwaldti Mello-Leitão, 1925 — Brazil
- M. maigsieus Barrion & Litsinger, 1995 — Philippines
- M. mexicanus O. Pickard-Cambridge, 1893 — USA, Mexico
- M. molitus Chickering, 1968 — Jamaica
- M. oblongus Yoshida, 1982 — Taiwan, Japan
- M. oblucus Chickering, 1968 — Jamaica
- M. orientalis Bösenberg & Strand, 1906 — China, Korea, Taiwan, Japan
- M. paraorientalis Dong, Zhu & Yoshida, 2005 — China
- M. pinopus Chickering, 1968 — Virgin Is.
- M. plumipes Kulczyński, 1911 — New Guinea
- M. poonaensis Tikader, 1971 — India
- M. raffrayi Simon, 1881 — Tanzania (Zanzibar), South Africa
- M. rimosus Simon, 1886 — Thailand, Vietnam
- M. romitii Caporiacco, 1947 — Guyana
- M. rubripes Mello-Leitão, 1949 — Brazil
- M. satpudaensis Rajoria, 2015 — India
- M. scoparius Simon, 1892 — St. Vincent
- M. sexpunctatus Simon, 1906 — India
- M. similis Kulczyński, 1908 — New Guinea
- M. simus Chamberlin & Ivie, 1936 — Panama
- M. singaporensis Kulczyński, 1908 — Singapore
- M. spatulatus Dong, Yan, Zhu & Song, 2004 — China
- M. sutherlandi Tikader, 1971 — India
- M. thwaitesi O. Pickard-Cambridge, 1870 (type) — India, Sri Lanka
- M. tonatus Chickering, 1968 — Jamaica
- M. trailli O. Pickard-Cambridge, 1882 — Brazil
- M. uludusun Logunov, 2018 — Malaysia (Borneo)
- M. unguliformis Dong, Yan, Zhu & Song, 2004 — China
- M. unipus Chickering, 1968 — Panama
- M. viridiventris Strand, 1911 — Indonesia (Kei Is.)

=== † Microuloborus ===
† Microuloborus Wunderlich, 2015

== O ==
=== Octonoba ===
Octonoba

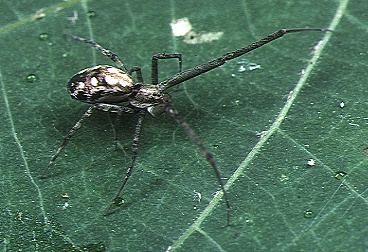
Octonoba okinawensis, female

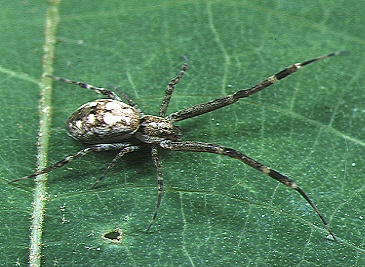
Octonoba yaeyamensis, female

Octonoba Opell, 1979

- O. albicola Yoshida, 2012 — Taiwan
- O. ampliata Dong, Zhu & Yoshida, 2005 — China
- O. aurita Dong, Zhu & Yoshida, 2005 — China
- O. basuensis Hu, 2001 — China
- O. bicornuta Seo, 2018 — Korea
- O. biforata Zhu, Sha & Chen, 1989 — China
- O. dentata Dong, Zhu & Yoshida, 2005 — China
- O. digitata Dong, Zhu & Yoshida, 2005 — China
- O. grandiconcava Yoshida, 1981 — Japan (Ryukyu Is.)
- O. grandiprojecta Yoshida, 1981 — Japan (Ryukyu Is.)
- O. kentingensis Yoshida, 2012 — Taiwan
- O. lanyuensis Yoshida, 2012 — Taiwan
- O. longshanensis Xie, Peng, Zhang, Gong & Kim, 1997 — China
- O. okinawensis Yoshida, 1981 — Japan (Okinawa)
- O. paralongshanensis Dong, Zhu & Yoshida, 2005 — China
- O. paravarians Dong, Zhu & Yoshida, 2005 — China
- O. rimosa Yoshida, 1983 — Japan (Ryukyu Is.)
- O. sanyanensis Barrion, Barrion-Dupo & Heong, 2013 — China (Hainan)
- O. senkakuensis Yoshida, 1983 — Japan
- O. serratula Dong, Zhu & Yoshida, 2005 — China
- O. sinensis (Simon, 1880) (type) — China, Korea, Japan. Introduced to USA
- O. spinosa Yoshida, 1982 — Taiwan
- O. sybotides (Bösenberg & Strand, 1906) — China, Korea, Japan
- O. taiwanica Yoshida, 1982 — Taiwan
- O. tanakai Yoshida, 1981 — Japan (Ryukyu Is.)
- O. uncinata Yoshida, 1981 — Japan (Ryukyu Is.)
- O. varians (Bösenberg & Strand, 1906) — China, Korea, Japan
- O. wanlessi Zhang, Zhu & Song, 2004 — China
- O. xihua Barrion, Barrion-Dupo & Heong, 2013 — China (Hainan)
- O. yaeyamensis Yoshida, 1981 — Japan (Ryukyu Is.)
- O. yaginumai Yoshida, 1981 — Japan (Okinawa)
- O. yesoensis (Saito, 1934) — Caucasus, Russia (Far East), Iran to Japan
- O. yoshidai Tanikawa, 2006 — Japan

=== † Ocululoborus ===
† Ocululoborus Wunderlich, 2012

=== † Opellianus ===
† Opellianus Wunderlich, 2004

=== Orinomana ===
Orinomana Strand, 1934

- O. ascha Grismado, 2000 — Argentina
- O. bituberculata (Keyserling, 1881) (type) — Ecuador, Peru
- O. florezi Grismado & Rubio, 2015 — Colombia
- O. galianoae Grismado, 2000 — Argentina
- O. mana Opell, 1979 — Chile
- O. penelope Grismado & Rubio, 2015 — Ecuador
- O. viracocha Grismado & Rubio, 2015 — Peru

== P ==
=== † Palaeomiagrammopes ===
† Palaeomiagrammopes Wunderlich, 2008

=== † Palaeouloborus ===
† Palaeouloborus Selden, 1990

=== † Paramiagrammopes ===
† Paramiagrammopes Wunderlich, 2008

=== Philoponella ===
Philoponella

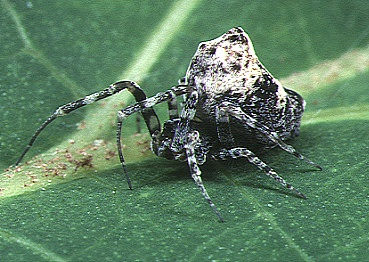
Philoponella prominens

Philoponella Mello-Leitão, 1917

- P. alata Lin & Li, 2008 — China
- P. angolensis (Lessert, 1933) — Ivory Coast, Angola
- P. arizonica (Gertsch, 1936) — USA, Mexico
- P. bella Opell, 1979 — Colombia
- P. collina (Keyserling, 1883) — Peru
- P. congregabilis (Rainbow, 1916) — Australia. Introduced to New Zealand
- P. cymbiformis Xie, Peng, Zhang, Gong & Kim, 1997 — China
- P. divisa Opell, 1979 — Colombia, Brazil
- P. duopunctata Faleiro & Santos, 2014 — Brazil
- P. fasciata (Mello-Leitão, 1917) — Brazil, Paraguay, Argentina
- P. fluviidulcifis Faleiro & Santos, 2014 — Brazil
- P. gibberosa (Kulczyński, 1908) — Indonesia (Java)
- P. herediae Opell, 1987 — Costa Rica
- P. hilaris (Simon, 1906) — India
- P. lingulata Dong, Zhu & Yoshida, 2005 — China
- P. lunaris (C. L. Koch, 1839) — Brazil
- P. mollis (Thorell, 1895) — Myanmar
- P. nasuta (Thorell, 1895) — China, Myanmar
- P. nigromaculata Yoshida, 1992 — Taiwan
- P. opelli Faleiro & Santos, 2014 — Ecuador, Brazil
- P. operosa (Simon, 1896) — South Africa
- P. oweni (Chamberlin, 1924) — USA, Mexico
- P. pantherina (Keyserling, 1890) — Australia (New South Wales)
- P. para Opell, 1979 — Paraguay, Argentina
- P. pisiformis Dong, Zhu & Yoshida, 2005 — China
- P. pomelita Grismado, 2004 — Argentina
- P. prominens (Bösenberg & Strand, 1906) — China, Korea, Taiwan, Japan
- P. quadrituberculata (Thorell, 1892) — Indonesia (Java, Moluccas)
- P. raffrayi (Simon, 1891) — Indonesia (Java, Moluccas)
- P. ramirezi Grismado, 2004 — Brazil
- P. republicana (Simon, 1891) (type) — Panama to Bolivia
- P. sabah Yoshida, 1992 — Borneo
- P. semiplumosa (Simon, 1893) — USA, Greater Antilles to Venezuela
- P. signatella (Roewer, 1951) — Mexico to Honduras
- P. subvittata Opell, 1981 — Guyana
- P. tingens (Chamberlin & Ivie, 1936) — Mexico to Colombia
- P. truncata (Thorell, 1895) — Myanmar, Indonesia (Java)
- P. variabilis (Keyserling, 1887) — Australia (Queensland, New South Wales)
- P. vicina (O. Pickard-Cambridge, 1899) — Mexico to Costa Rica
- P. vittata (Keyserling, 1881) — Panama to Paraguay
- P. wuyiensis Xie, Peng, Zhang, Gong & Kim, 1997 — China

=== † Planibulbus ===
† Planibulbus Wunderlich, 2018

=== Polenecia ===
Polenecia Lehtinen, 1967

- P. producta (Simon, 1873) (type) — Mediterranean to Azerbaijan

=== † Propterkachin ===
† Propterkachin Wunderlich, 2017

=== Purumitra ===
Purumitra Lehtinen, 1967

- P. australiensis Opell, 1995 — Australia (Queensland)
- P. grammica (Simon, 1893) (type) — Philippines, Caroline Is.

== S ==
=== Siratoba ===
Siratoba Opell, 1979

- S. referens (Muma & Gertsch, 1964) (type) — USA, Mexico
- S. reticens (Gertsch & Davis, 1942) — Mexico

=== Sybota ===
Sybota Simon, 1892

- S. abdominalis (Nicolet, 1849) (type) — Chile
- S. atlantica Grismado, 2001 — Argentina
- S. compagnuccii Grismado, 2007 — Argentina
- S. mendozae Opell, 1979 — Argentina
- S. osornis Opell, 1979 — Chile
- S. rana (Mello-Leitão, 1941) — Argentina

== T ==
=== † Talbragaraneus ===
† Talbragaraneus Selden and Beattie, 2013

== U ==
=== Uaitemuri ===
Uaitemuri Santos & Gonzaga, 2017

- U. demariai Santos & Gonzaga, 2017 — Brazil
- U. rupicola Santos & Gonzaga, 2017 (type) — Brazil

=== † Ulobomopes ===
† Ulobomopes Wunderlich, 2004

=== Uloborus ===
Uloborus

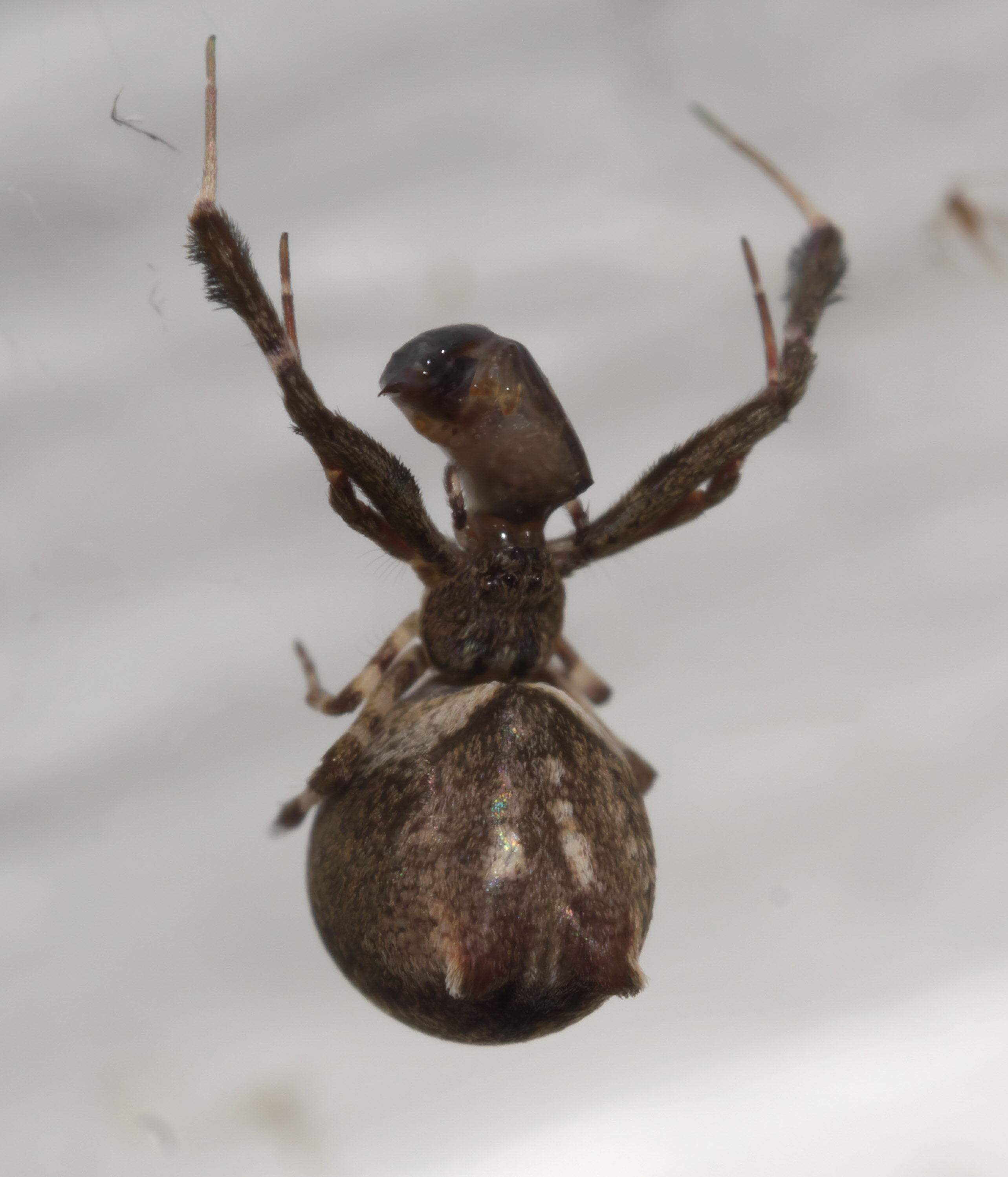
Uloborus glomosus

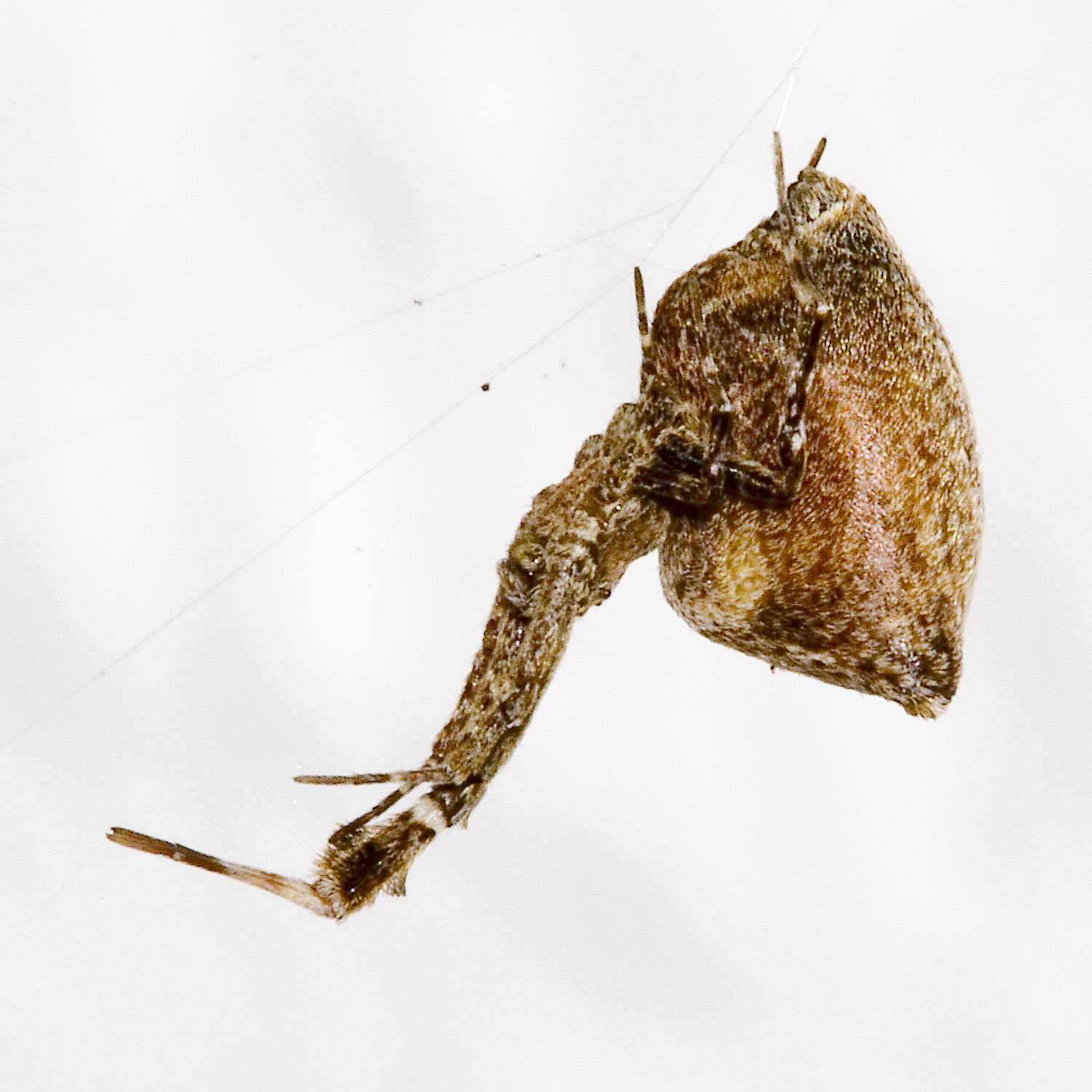
Uloborus plumipes

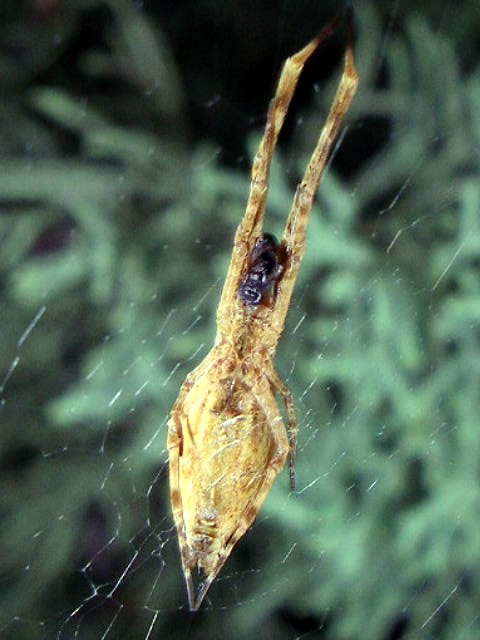
Uloborus walckenaerius

Uloborus Latreille, 1806

- U. albescens O. Pickard-Cambridge, 1885 — China (Yarkand)
- U. albofasciatus Chrysanthus, 1967 — New Guinea
- U. albolineatus Mello-Leitão, 1941 — Argentina
- U. ater Mello-Leitão, 1917 — Brazil
- U. aureus Vinson, 1863 — Madagascar
- U. barbipes L. Koch, 1872 — Australia (Queensland)
- U. berlandi Roewer, 1951 — Guinea
- U. biconicus Yin & Hu, 2012 — China
- U. bigibbosus Simon, 1905 — India
- U. bispiralis Opell, 1982 — New Guinea
- U. campestratus Simon, 1893 — USA to Venezuela
- U. canescens C. L. Koch, 1844 — Colombia
- U. canus MacLeay, 1827 — Australia
- U. cellarius Yin & Yan, 2012 — China
- U. chinmoyiae Biswas & Raychaudhuri, 2013 — Bangladesh
- U. conus Opell, 1982 — New Guinea
- U. crucifaciens Hingston, 1927 — Myanmar
- U. cubicus (Thorell, 1898) — Myanmar
- U. danolius Tikader, 1969 — India (mainland, Nicobar Is.)
- U. diversus Marx, 1898 — USA, Mexico
- U. eberhardi Opell, 1981 — Costa Rica
- U. elongatus Opell, 1982 — Argentina
- U. emarginatus Kulczyński, 1908 — Indonesia (Java)
- U. ferokus Bradoo, 1979 — India
- U. filidentatus Hingston, 1932 — Guyana
- U. filifaciens Hingston, 1927 — India (Andaman Is.)
- U. filinodatus Hingston, 1932 — Guyana
- U. formosanus Yoshida, 2012 — Taiwan
- U. formosus Marx, 1898 — Mexico
- U. furunculus Simon, 1906 — India
- U. gilvus (Blackwall, 1870) — Italy, Greece
- U. glomosus (Walckenaer, 1841) — USA, Canada, Mexico
- U. guangxiensis Zhu, Sha & Chen, 1989 — China
- U. humeralis Hasselt, 1882 — Myanmar, Indonesia (Sumatra, Java)
  - U. h. marginatus Kulczyński, 1908 — Indonesia (Java)
- U. inaequalis Kulczyński, 1908 — New Guinea
- U. jabalpurensis Bhandari & Gajbe, 2001 — India
- U. jarrei Berland & Millot, 1940 — Guinea
- U. kerevatensis Opell, 1991 — New Guinea
- U. khasiensis Tikader, 1969 — India
- U. krishnae Tikader, 1970 — India (mainland, Nicobar Is.)
- U. leucosagma Thorell, 1895 — Myanmar
- U. limbatus Thorell, 1895 — Myanmar
- U. llastay Grismado, 2002 — Argentina
- U. lugubris (Thorell, 1895) — Myanmar
- U. metae Opell, 1981 — Colombia
- U. minutus Mello-Leitão, 1915 — Brazil
- U. modestus Thorell, 1891 — India (Nicobar Is.)
- U. montifer Marples, 1955 — Samoa
- U. niger Mello-Leitão, 1917 — Brazil
- U. oculatus Kulczyński, 1908 — Singapore
- U. parvulus Schmidt, 1976 — Canary Is.
- U. penicillatoides Xie, Peng, Zhang, Gong & Kim, 1997 — China
- U. pictus Thorell, 1898 — Myanmar
- U. pinnipes Thorell, 1877 — Indonesia (Sulawesi)
- U. planipedius Simon, 1896 — East, South Africa
- U. plumipes Lucas, 1846 — Europe, Africa, Yemen, Iran, Pakistan. Introduced to Argentina, Philippines, Japan
  - U. p. javanus Kulczyński, 1908 — Indonesia (Java)
- U. plumosus Schmidt, 1956 — Guinea
- U. pteropus (Thorell, 1887) — Myanmar
- U. rufus Schmidt & Krause, 1995 — Cape Verde Is.
- U. scutifaciens Hingston, 1927 — Myanmar
- U. segregatus Gertsch, 1936 — USA to Colombia
- U. sexfasciatus Simon, 1893 — Philippines
- U. spelaeus Bristowe, 1952 — Malaysia
- U. strandi (Caporiacco, 1940) — Ethiopia
- U. tenuissimus L. Koch, 1872 — Samoa
- U. tetramaculatus Mello-Leitão, 1940 — Brazil
- U. trifasciatus Thorell, 1890 — Indonesia (Sunda Is.)
- U. trilineatus Keyserling, 1883 — Mexico to Argentina
- U. umboniger Kulczyński, 1908 — Sri Lanka
- U. undulatus Thorell, 1878 — Indonesia (Java) to New Guinea
  - U. u. indicus Kulczyński, 1908 — Malaysia
  - U. u. obscurior Kulczyński, 1908 — New Guinea
  - U. u. pallidior Kulczyński, 1908 — Indonesia (Java) to New Guinea
- U. vanillarum Vinson, 1863 — Madagascar
- U. velutinus Butler, 1883 — Madagascar
- U. villosus Keyserling, 1881 — Colombia
- U. viridimicans Simon, 1893 — Philippines
- U. walckenaerius Latreille, 1806 (type) — Madeira, Europe, Turkey, Caucasus, Russia (Europe to Far East), Iraq, Iran, Central Asia, China, Korea, Japan

== W ==
=== Waitkera ===
Waitkera Opell, 1979

- W. waitakerensis (Chamberlain, 1946) (type) — New Zealand

== Z ==
=== Zosis ===
Zosis

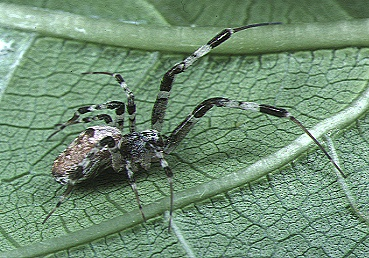
Humped spider
(Zosis geniculata), female

Zosis Walckenaer, 1841

- Z. costalimae (Mello-Leitão, 1917) — Brazil
- Z. geniculata (Olivier, 1789) (type) — Southern USA to Brazil, Caribbean. Introduced to Macaronesia, West Africa, Seychelles, India, Indonesia, Philippines, China, Korea, Japan, Australia, Hawaii
  - Z. g. altissima (Franganillo, 1926) — Cuba
  - Z. g. fusca (Caporiacco, 1948) — Guyana
  - Z. g. humilis (Franganillo, 1926) — Cuba
  - Z. g. quadripunctata (Franganillo, 1926) — Cuba
  - Z. g. similis (Franganillo, 1926) — Cuba
  - Z. g. timorensis (Schenkel, 1944) — Timor
- Z. peruana (Keyserling, 1881) — Colombia to Argentina
