= Anatoborus =

Scientific classification
- Kingdom: Animalia
- Phylum: Arthropoda
- Subphylum: Chelicerata
- Class: Arachnida
- Order: Araneae
- Infraorder: Araneomorphae
- Family: Uloboridae
- Genus: Anatoborus; Milledge, 2025
- Species: A. grayi

Binomial name
- Anatoborus grayi Milledge, 2025

Genus of spiders

Anatoborus is a monotypic genus of cribellate orb-weavers first described by Graham A. Milledge in 2025. Its sole described species Anatoborus grayi is found on Lord Howe Island, New South Wales, Australia.

It is related to the genera Lehtineniana Sherwood, 2022 and Waitkera Opell, 1979, and shares with them relatively simplified genitals.

== Behavior ==
Although their behavior has not been directly observed, collection data suggests that they spin an orb web and are mostly found on foliage.

== Description ==
The body color in both sexes is pale yellowish with weak darker markings on carapace, abdomen and legs.

== Etymology ==
The genus name is in contrast to the genus name Uloborus ("deadly bite"). Also derived from Greek, it is a combination of anatos, meaning harmless and boros meaning bite.

The species is named "for the late Dr Michael R. Gray (1941-2023) for his pioneering collecting of spiders on Lord Howe Island."
