= Sybota (disambiguation) =

Sybota is a genus of spiders.

Sybota may also refer to:

- Sybota (Epirus), a town of ancient Epirus, Greece
- Sybota Islands, islands off the coast of the former
