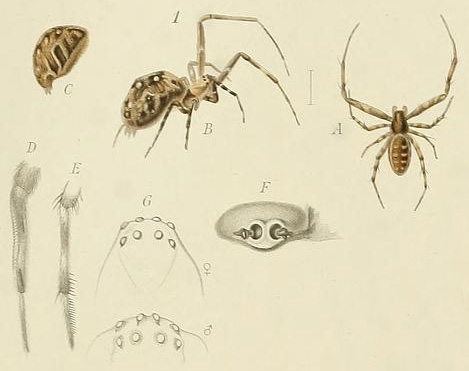
- diagnostic drawings from original description

Scientific classification
- Kingdom: Animalia
- Phylum: Arthropoda
- Subphylum: Chelicerata
- Class: Arachnida
- Order: Araneae
- Infraorder: Araneomorphae
- Family: Uloboridae
- Genus: Octonoba
- Species: O. varians

Binomial name
- Octonoba varians (Bösenberg & Strand, 1906)

Synonyms
- Uloborus varians Bösenberg & Strand, 1906; Uloborus defectus Bösenberg & Strand, 1906; Uloborus dubius Bösenberg & Strand, 1906; Uloborus incognitus Dönitz & Strand, 1906; Zosis varians (Lehtinen, 1967)

= Octonoba varians =

Species of spider

Octonoba varians is a species of spider in the family Uloboridae. It is native to East Asia, being found in China, Korea, and Japan.

The species was originally described as Uloborus varians by Bösenberg and Strand in 1906, and was later transferred to the genus Octonoba by Yoshida in 1980.

== Taxonomy ==
Octonoba varians has a complex taxonomic history. It was first described as Uloborus varians in 1906 by Bösenberg and Strand. In the same publication, the same authors also described Uloborus defectus and Uloborus dubius, which were later synonymized with O. varians. Additionally, Uloborus incognitus, described by Dönitz and Strand in 1906, was also placed in synonymy with this species.

In 1967, Lehtinen transferred the species to the genus Zosis, but this placement was subsequently rejected when Yoshida transferred it to Octonoba in 1980, where it remains today.

== Distribution ==
O. varians is found across East Asia. Its range includes China, South Korea, and Japan. The species has been recorded from various regions within these countries and appears to have a relatively broad distribution across temperate East Asia.

== Description ==
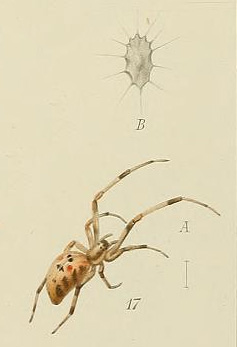
subadult female, originally described as Uloborus incognitus

Octonoba varians exhibits the typical characteristics of the family Uloboridae, having a cribellum and lacking venom glands. The species shows sexual dimorphism, with females being larger than males.

Females typically measure 4-6 mm in body length, while males are smaller at 3-5 mm. The cephalothorax displays distinctive coloration with a median light stripe and two marginal light stripes. The opisthosoma is characterized by having its highest point at the basal third, which bears a prominent hump in the middle.

The species creates characteristic orb webs typical of the Uloboridae family, using cribellate silk combed out by specialized setae called a calamistrum located on the fourth legs.

== Habitat ==
Octonoba varians inhabits various terrestrial environments including forests, woodland areas, and gardens. Like other members of Uloboridae, it constructs horizontal orb webs to capture prey. The species appears to prefer areas with vegetation that can provide suitable anchor points for web construction.
