= Octonoba yesoensis =

Scientific classification
- Kingdom: Animalia
- Phylum: Arthropoda
- Subphylum: Chelicerata
- Class: Arachnida
- Order: Araneae
- Infraorder: Araneomorphae
- Family: Uloboridae
- Genus: Octonoba
- Species: O. yesoensis

Binomial name
- Octonoba yesoensis (Saito, 1934)

Synonyms
- Argyrodes yesoensis Saito, 1934; Zosis yesoensis (Saito, 1934); Uloborus yesoensis (Saito, 1934); Zosis hyrcana Brignoli, 1979; Octonoba yesoensis (Saito, 1934); Uloborus georgicus Mcheidze, 1997; Micrathena gracilis Breene et al., 1993

Species of spider

Octonoba yesoensis, synonyms including Uloborus georgicus, is an Asian spider species native from the Caucasus through Iran and the Russian Far East to Japan.
