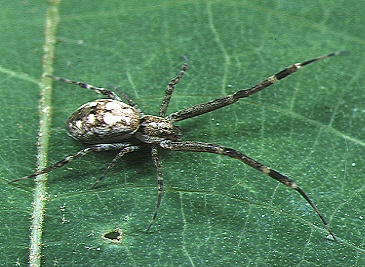
- Female Octonoba yaeyamensis

Scientific classification
- Kingdom: Animalia
- Phylum: Arthropoda
- Subphylum: Chelicerata
- Class: Arachnida
- Order: Araneae
- Infraorder: Araneomorphae
- Family: Uloboridae
- Genus: Octonoba
- Species: O. yaeyamensis

Binomial name
- Octonoba yaeyamensis Yoshida, 1981

= Octonoba yaeyamensis =

Species of spider

Octonoba yaeyamensis is a species of cribellate orb weaver in the family of spiders known as Uloboridae. It is endemic to the Yaeyama Islands in the Nansei Archipelago of Japan.

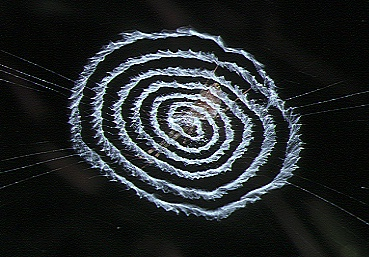
An Octonoba yaeyamensis with a spiral stabilimenta.
