= Octonoba sinensis =

Scientific classification
- Kingdom: Animalia
- Phylum: Arthropoda
- Subphylum: Chelicerata
- Class: Arachnida
- Order: Araneae
- Infraorder: Araneomorphae
- Family: Uloboridae
- Genus: Octonoba
- Species: O. sinensis

Binomial name
- Octonoba sinensis (Simon, 1880)

Species of spider

Octonoba sinensis is a species of cribellate orb weaver in the spider family Uloboridae. It is found in China, Korea, Japan, and has been introduced into the United States.
