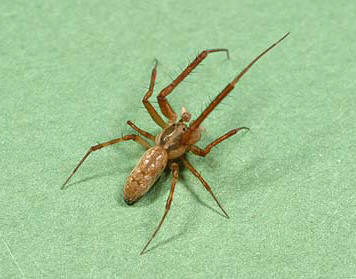
- O. grandiprojecta, male
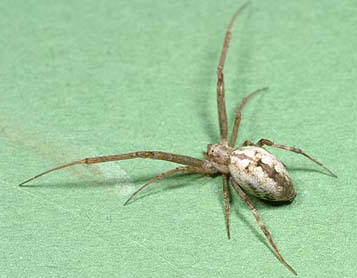
- O. grandiprojecta, female

Scientific classification
- Domain: Eukaryota
- Kingdom: Animalia
- Phylum: Arthropoda
- Subphylum: Chelicerata
- Class: Arachnida
- Order: Araneae
- Infraorder: Araneomorphae
- Family: Uloboridae
- Genus: Octonoba; Opell

Type species
- Octonoba sinensis

Species
- 33, see text

= Octonoba =

Genus of spiders

Octonoba is a genus of Asian cribellate orb weavers first described in 1979 by Brent Opell. Members of this genus and those of Purumitra both have a large concave median apophysis and a conspicuous hematodocha. However, these spiders are generally much larger, with a carapace greater than 1.4 millimeters long, where those of Purumitra are usually less than 1 millimeter long.

== Species ==
As of 2022, it contains 33 species:

- Octonoba albicola Yoshida, 2012 – Taiwan
- Octonoba ampliata Dong, Zhu & Yoshida, 2005 – China
- Octonoba aurita Dong, Zhu & Yoshida, 2005 – China
- Octonoba basuensis Hu, 2001 – China
- Octonoba bicornuta Seo, 2018 – Korea
- Octonoba biforata Zhu, Sha & Chen, 1989 – China
- Octonoba dentata Dong, Zhu & Yoshida, 2005 – China
- Octonoba digitata Dong, Zhu & Yoshida, 2005 – China
- Octonoba grandiconcava Yoshida, 1981 – Japan (Ryukyu Is.)
- Octonoba grandiprojecta Yoshida, 1981 – Japan (Ryukyu Is.)
- Octonoba kentingensis Yoshida, 2012 – Taiwan
- Octonoba lanyuensis Yoshida, 2012 – Taiwan
- Octonoba longshanensis Xie, Peng, Zhang, Gong & Kim, 1997 – China
- Octonoba okinawensis Yoshida, 1981 – Japan (Okinawa)
- Octonoba paralongshanensis Dong, Zhu & Yoshida, 2005 – China
- Octonoba paravarians Dong, Zhu & Yoshida, 2005 – China
- Octonoba rimosa Yoshida, 1983 – Japan (Ryukyu Is.)
- Octonoba sanyanensis Barrion, Barrion-Dupo & Heong, 2013 – China (Hainan)
- Octonoba senkakuensis Yoshida, 1983 – Japan
- Octonoba serratula Dong, Zhu & Yoshida, 2005 – China
- Octonoba sinensis (Simon, 1880) – China, Korea, Japan. Introduced to USA
- Octonoba spinosa Yoshida, 1982 – Taiwan
- Octonoba sybotides (Bösenberg & Strand, 1906) – China, Korea, Japan
- Octonoba taiwanica Yoshida, 1982 – Taiwan
- Octonoba tanakai Yoshida, 1981 – Japan (Ryukyu Is.)
- Octonoba uncinata Yoshida, 1981 – Japan (Ryukyu Is.)
- Octonoba varians (Bösenberg & Strand, 1906) – China, Korea, Japan
- Octonoba wanlessi Zhang, Zhu & Song, 2004 – China
- Octonoba xihua Barrion, Barrion-Dupo & Heong, 2013 – China (Hainan)
- Octonoba yaeyamensis Yoshida, 1981 – Japan (Ryukyu Is.)
- Octonoba yaginumai Yoshida, 1981 – Japan (Okinawa)
- Octonoba yesoensis (Saito, 1934) – Caucasus, Russia (Far East), Iran to Japan
- Octonoba yoshidai Tanikawa, 2006 – Japan
