= Miagrammopes longicaudus =

Long-tailed Single-Line Web Spider

Scientific classification
- Kingdom: Animalia
- Phylum: Arthropoda
- Subphylum: Chelicerata
- Class: Arachnida
- Order: Araneae
- Infraorder: Araneomorphae
- Family: Uloboridae
- Genus: Miagrammopes
- Species: M. longicaudus

Binomial name
- Miagrammopes longicaudus O. Pickard-Cambridge, 1882

Synonyms
- Miagrammopes longicauda O. Pickard-Cambridge, 1882; Miagrammopes longicaudatus Opell, 1984

Species of spider

Miagrammopes longicaudus is a species of spider in the family Uloboridae. It is a southern African endemic commonly known as the long-tailed single-line web spider.

== Distribution ==
Miagrammopes longicaudus is found only in South Africa. The species is known only from the type locality given as Caffraria. Caffraria was a name given first to southern Africa, then to Xhosaland (the area between the Kei and Keiskamma rivers) and subsequently to the Eastern Cape Province, but no exact locality is known.

== Habitat and ecology ==
The habitat and ecology of this species are unknown.

== Conservation ==
Miagrammopes longicaudus is listed as Data Deficient by the South African National Biodiversity Institute due to the lack of data on the species. Types need to be re-examined and redescribed, and more sampling is needed.

== Taxonomy ==
Miagrammopes longicaudus was described by O. Pickard-Cambridge in 1882 from Caffraria. The species has not been revised and is known from both sexes but poorly described.
