= Uloborus canus =

Scientific classification
- Kingdom: Animalia
- Phylum: Arthropoda
- Subphylum: Chelicerata
- Class: Arachnida
- Order: Araneae
- Infraorder: Araneomorphae
- Family: Uloboridae
- Genus: Uloborus
- Species: U. canus

Binomial name
- Uloborus canus W.S. Macleay, 1827

Species of spider

Uloborus canus is a species of spider in the family Uloboridae, found in Australia. The species was first described by W.S. Macleay in 1827. His very brief description said it had a convex white thorax, the first and second legs were equal in length, and the femora were black-spotted. The type specimen has been lost.
