= Uaitemuri =

Scientific classification
- Domain: Eukaryota
- Kingdom: Animalia
- Phylum: Arthropoda
- Subphylum: Chelicerata
- Class: Arachnida
- Order: Araneae
- Infraorder: Araneomorphae
- Family: Uloboridae
- Genus: Uaitemuri; Santos & Gonzaga, 2017

Species
- U. demariai Santos & Gonzaga, 2017 — Brazil; U. rupicola Santos & Gonzaga, 2017 — Brazil

Genus of spiders

Uaitemuri is a genus of Brazilian cribellate orb-weavers first described by A. J. Santos & M. O. Gonzaga in 2017. As of April 2019 it contains only two species.
