= Orinomana =

Scientific classification
- Kingdom: Animalia
- Phylum: Arthropoda
- Subphylum: Chelicerata
- Class: Arachnida
- Order: Araneae
- Infraorder: Araneomorphae
- Family: Uloboridae
- Genus: Orinomana; Strand

Type species
- Orinomana bituberculata

Species
- 7, see text

Genus of spiders

Orinomana is a genus of spiders in the family Uloboridae. It was first described in 1934 by Strand. As of 2017, it contains 7 South American species.

== Species ==
Orinomana comprises the following species:

- Orinomana ascha Grismado, 2000
- Orinomana bituberculata Keyserling, 1881
- Orinomana florezi Grismado & Rubio, 2015
- Orinomana galianoae Grismado, 2000
- Orinomana mana Opell, 1979
- Orinomana penelope Grismado & Rubio, 2015
- Orinomana viracocha Grismado & Rubio, 2015
