= Lubinella =

Scientific classification
- Domain: Eukaryota
- Kingdom: Animalia
- Phylum: Arthropoda
- Subphylum: Chelicerata
- Class: Arachnida
- Order: Araneae
- Infraorder: Araneomorphae
- Family: Uloboridae
- Genus: Lubinella
- Species: L. morobensis

Binomial name
- Lubinella morobensis Opell, 1984

Genus of spiders

Lubinella is a genus of spiders in the family Uloboridae. It was first described in 1984 by Opell. This genus was named after arachnologist Yael D. Lubin. As of 2017, it contains only one species, Lubinella morobensis, from New Guinea.
