= Astavakra =

Scientific classification
- Kingdom: Animalia
- Phylum: Arthropoda
- Subphylum: Chelicerata
- Class: Arachnida
- Order: Araneae
- Infraorder: Araneomorphae
- Family: Uloboridae
- Genus: Astavakra
- Species: A. sexmucronata

Binomial name
- Astavakra sexmucronata (Simon, 1893)

Genus of spiders

Astavakra is a genus of spiders in the family Uloboridae. It was first described in 1967 by Lehtinen. As of 2017, it contains only one species, Astavakra sexmucronata, found in the Philippines.
