= Conifaber =

Scientific classification
- Domain: Eukaryota
- Kingdom: Animalia
- Phylum: Arthropoda
- Subphylum: Chelicerata
- Class: Arachnida
- Order: Araneae
- Infraorder: Araneomorphae
- Family: Uloboridae
- Genus: Conifaber; Opell, in Lubin et al., 1982

Type species
- Conifaber parvus Opell, in Lubin et al., 1982

Species
- Conifaber guarani Grismado, 2004; Conifaber manicoba Salvatierra, Brescovit & Tourinho, 2017; Conifaber parvus Opell, in Lubin et al., 1982; Conifaber yasi Grismado, 2004

Genus of spiders

Conifaber is a genus of spiders in the family Uloboridae. It was first described in 1982 by Opell. As of 2017, it contains 4 species, all from South America:

- Conifaber guarani Grismado, 2004 — Paraguay, Argentina
- Conifaber manicoba Salvatierra, Brescovit & Tourinho, 2017 — Brazil
- Conifaber parvus Opell, in Lubin et al., 1982 — Colombia
- Conifaber yasi Grismado, 2004 — Argentina
