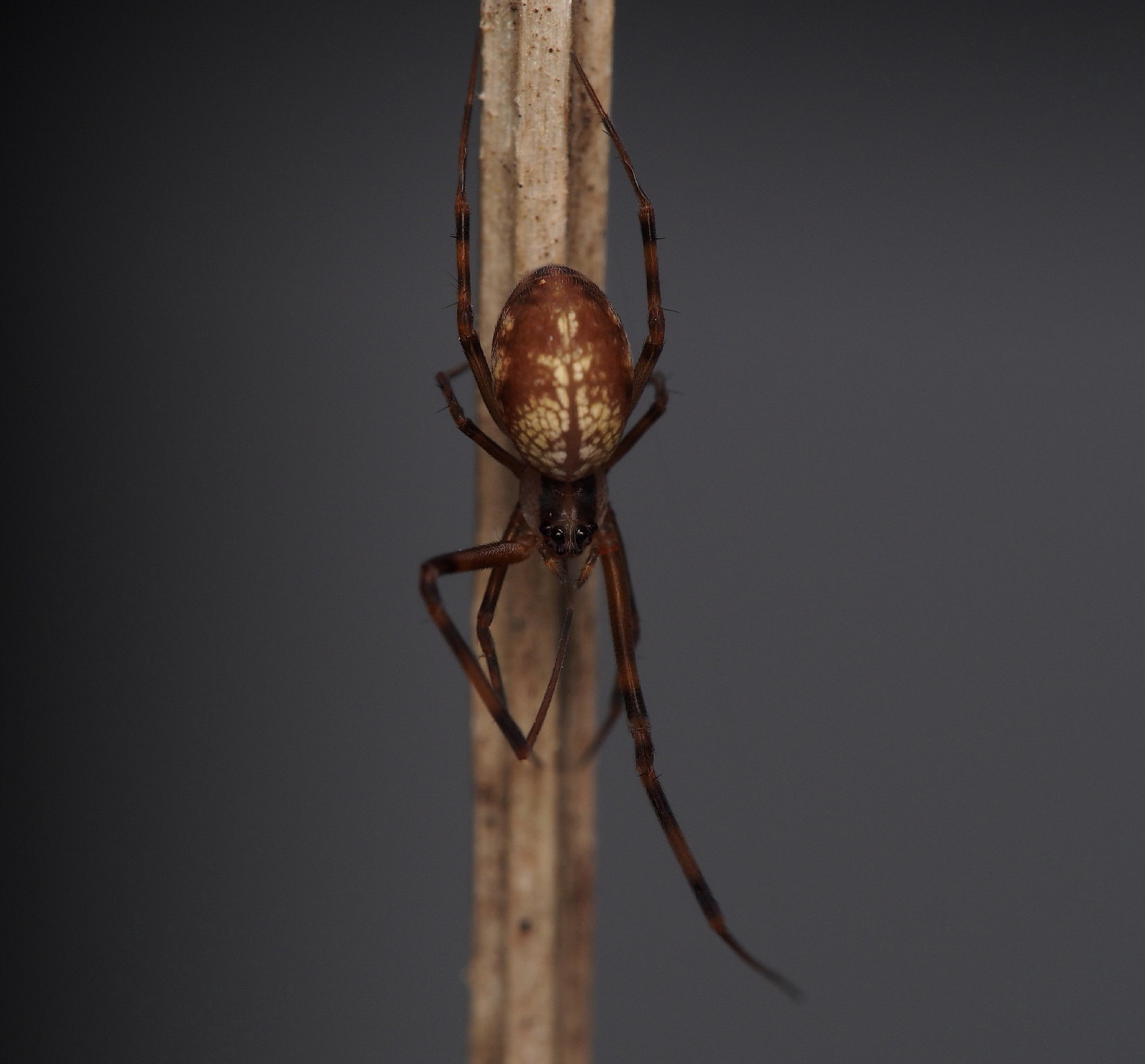

Conservation status
- Not Threatened (NZ TCS)

Scientific classification
- Domain: Eukaryota
- Kingdom: Animalia
- Phylum: Arthropoda
- Subphylum: Chelicerata
- Class: Arachnida
- Order: Araneae
- Infraorder: Araneomorphae
- Family: Uloboridae
- Genus: Waitkera; Opell, 1979
- Species: W. waitakerensis

Binomial name
- Waitkera waitakerensis (Chamberlain, 1946)

Synonyms
- Uloborus waitakerensis Tangaroa waitakerensis

= Waitkera =

Waitkera waitakerensis

Genus of spiders

Waitkera is a genus of spiders in the family Uloboridae. It was first described in 1979 by Opell. As of 2021, it contains only one species, Waitkera waitakerensis, found in New Zealand.

== Taxonomy ==
This species was described as Uloborus waitakerensis in 1946 by George Chamberlain from female specimens collected in the Waitakere Ranges. It was transferred to the Tangaroa genus in 1967. In 1979, it was moved to the Waitkera genus, of which it is the sole member. The holotype is stored in Te Papa Museum under registration number AS.000124.

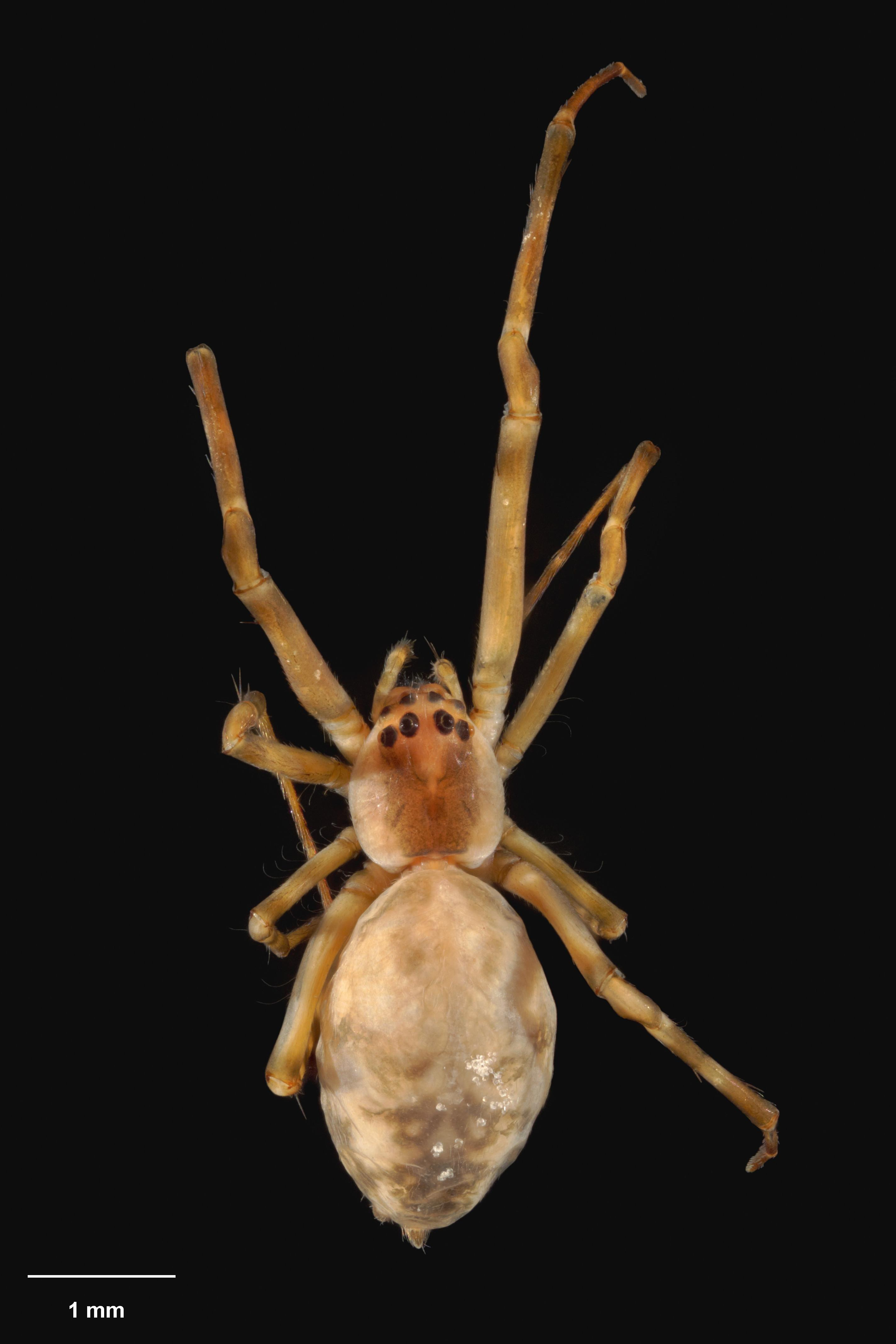
Holotype specimen of Waitkera waitakerensis.

== Description ==
Female Waitkera waitakerensis are 3-5mm in length whereas males are 3-4mm in length. The female may weigh about 9 mg. The carapace is grey with light lateral margins. The dorsal side of the abdomen is white with five to six posteromedian grey chevrons whilst the ventral side is grey with white book lung covers. There may also be three pairs of white spots above the cribellum. There is also a Northland ecotype that occupies different habitat and is larger than the rest of W. waitakerensis.

Research published in 2007 showed that females of W. waitakerensis are larger at more northerly and thus warmer sites.

== Distribution/Habitat ==
Waitkera waitakerensis is restricted to the North Island of New Zealand. This species is the only member of the family Uloboridae endemic to New Zealand. The species is typically found in forests where horizontal orb-webs are constructed in understory vegetation. The Northland ecotype lives in shaded rock crevices of cliffs.

== Conservation status ==
Under the New Zealand Threat Classification System, this species is listed as "Not Threatened".
