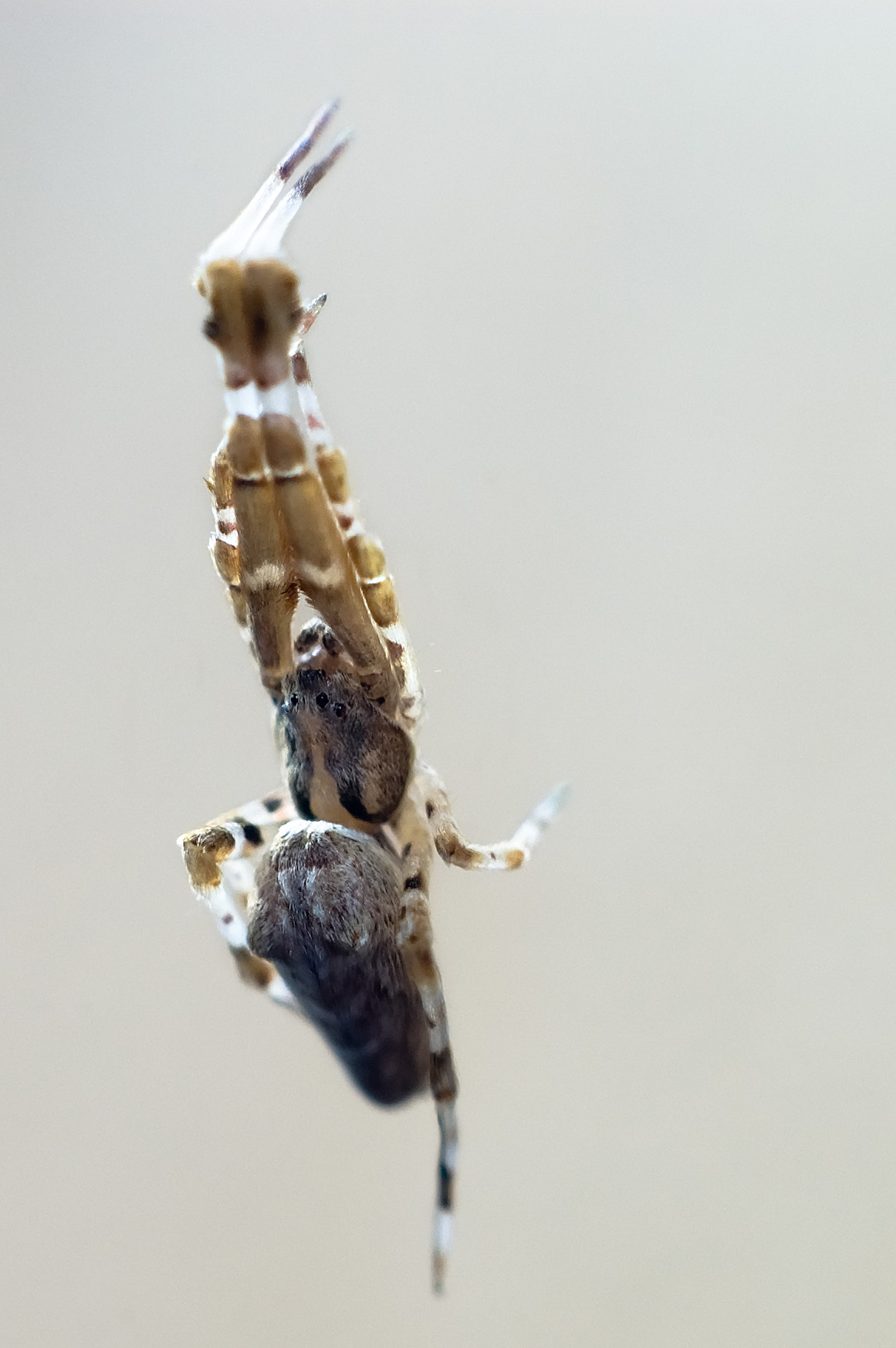

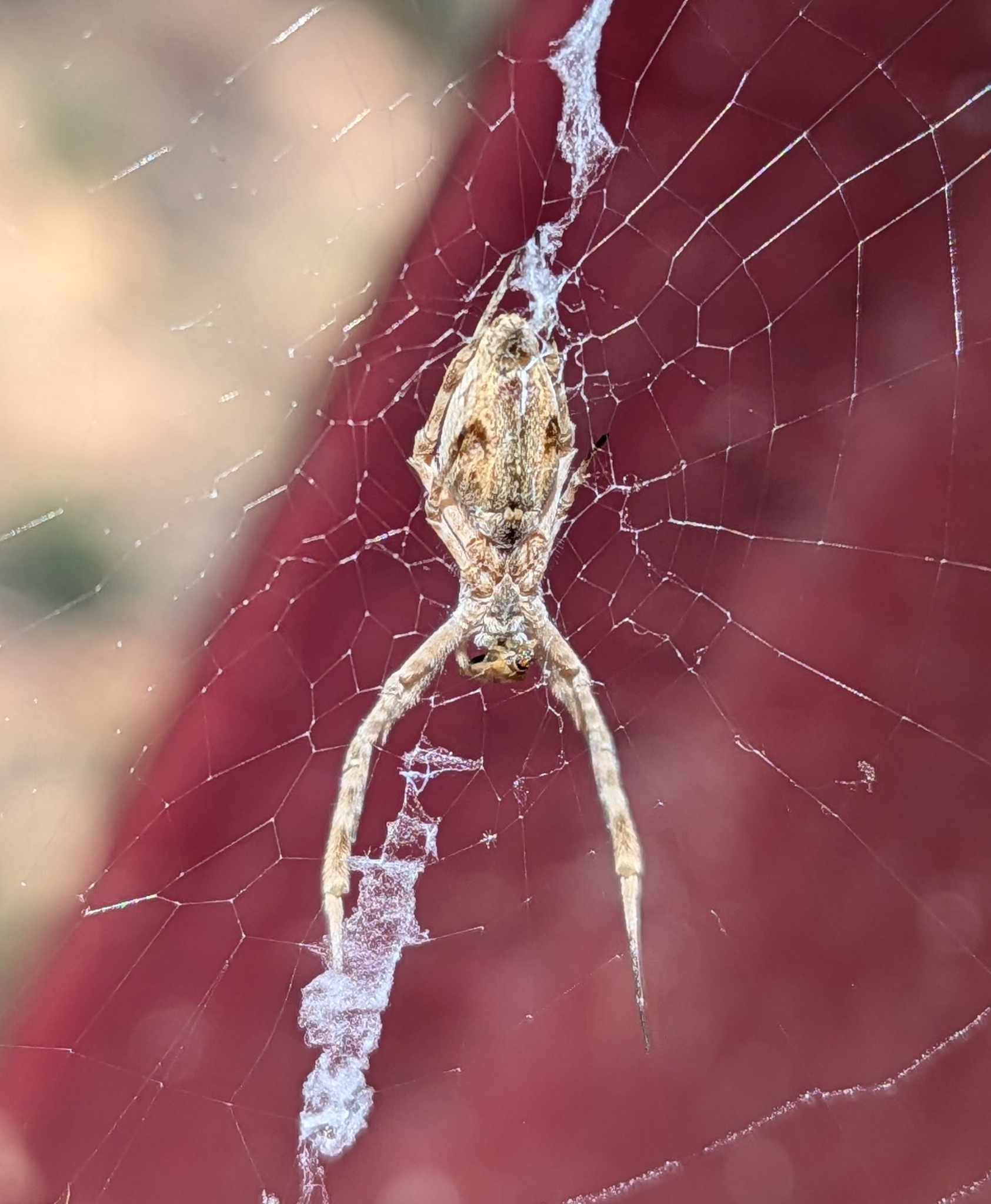

Scientific classification
- Kingdom: Animalia
- Phylum: Arthropoda
- Subphylum: Chelicerata
- Class: Arachnida
- Order: Araneae
- Infraorder: Araneomorphae
- Family: Uloboridae
- Genus: Uloborus
- Species: U. walckenaerius

Binomial name
- Uloborus walckenaerius Latreille, 1806
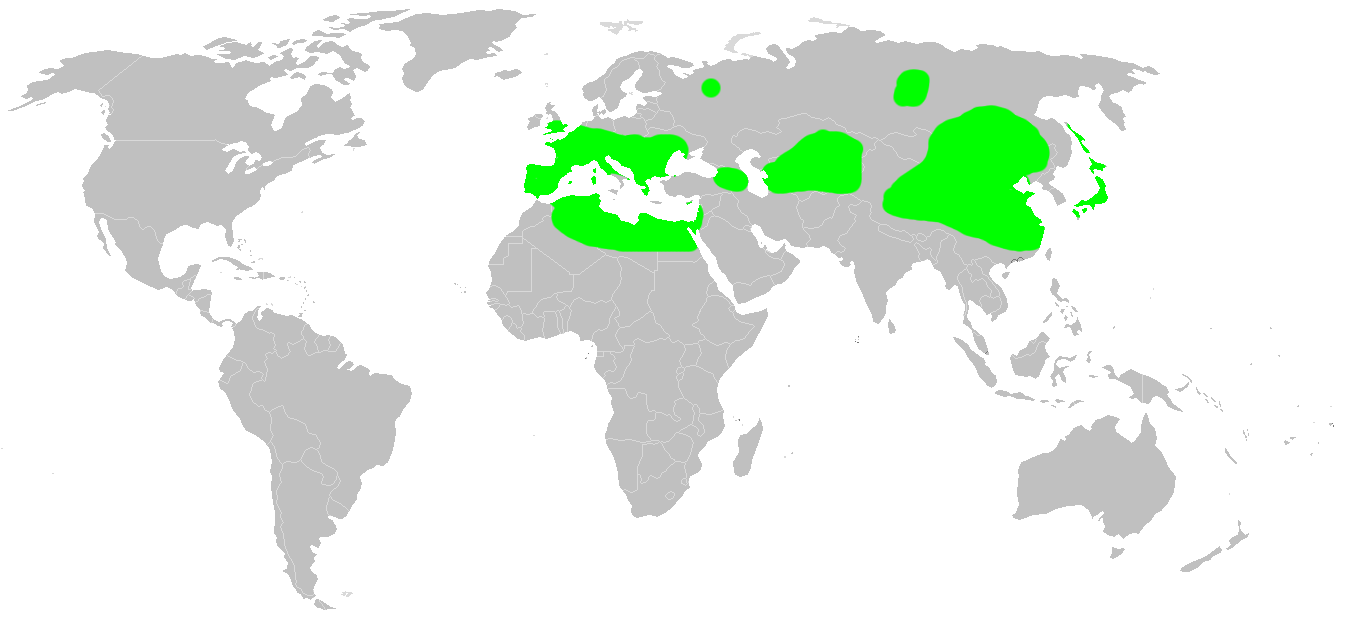

Synonyms
- Dysdera fasciata Risso, 1826; Veleda lineata Blackwall, 1859; Veleda pallens Blackwall, 1862; Uloborus walckenaerii Chyzer & Kulczyński, 1891; Uloborus pseudacanthus Franganillo, 1910

= Uloborus walckenaerius =

Fluffy Hackled Orb-Web Spider

Species of spider

Uloborus walckenaerius, also known as the feather-legged spider, is a cribellate spider in the family Uloboridae. Like all spiders in this family, they do not have venom glands and immobilize their prey with over 140 m of thread. They are named in honor of Charles Athanase Walckenaer.

It is commonly known as the fluffy hackled orb-web spider.

== Description ==
Adult females have a body length of 3.5–6 mm (0.14–0.24 in), males 3–4 mm (0.12–0.17 in). They have a dark grey prosoma, covered with white hairs, leaving some dark bands uncovered. They have eight eyes, arranged in two almost parallel rows of four, with the anterior lateral eyes on the front corners of the head. The abdomen is greyish-white in colour, with a continuation of the pattern on the carapace. It bears a brown median line, with alternating white and brown bands on either side. There are fluffy white tufts of hair on the white bands, which are very distinct from the side. The legs range from dark grey-brown to reddish-brown, with faint, white annulations. The front two pairs of legs are significantly longer than the rear pairs.

== Distribution and habitat ==
Uloborus walckenaerius has a widespread distribution throughout the Palearctic region and has been introduced to Cape Verde, Saint Helena, and South Africa.

The spider lives in warm, open terrain, like heathland, and weaves horizontal cribellate orb webs close to the ground. A stabilimentum is sometimes present, and the spider hangs beneath the hub.
