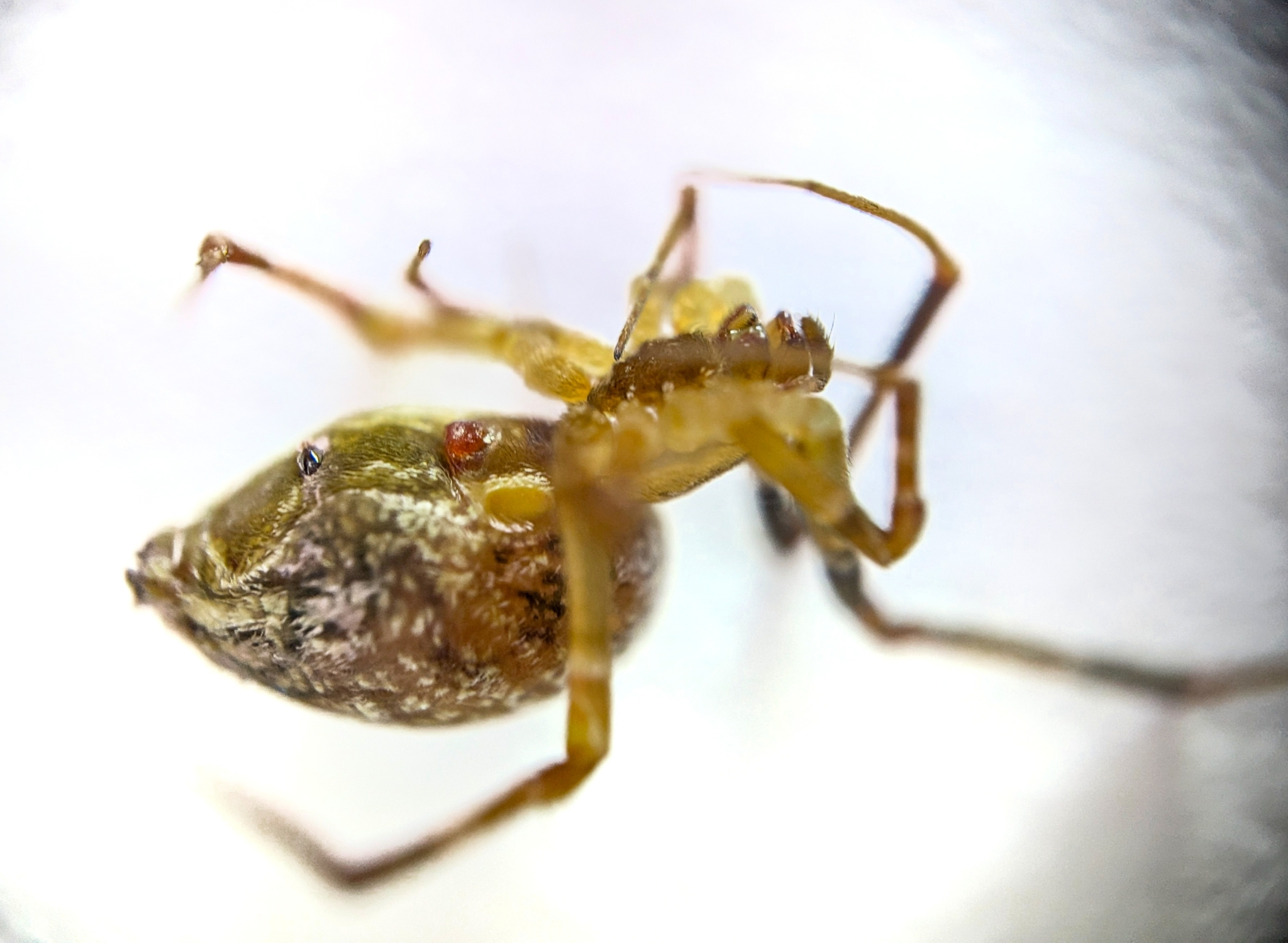

Scientific classification
- Kingdom: Animalia
- Phylum: Arthropoda
- Subphylum: Chelicerata
- Class: Arachnida
- Order: Araneae
- Infraorder: Araneomorphae
- Family: Uloboridae
- Genus: Ariston; O. Pickard-Cambridge, 1896

Type species
- A. albicans O. Pickard-Cambridge, 1896

Species
- 5, see text

= Ariston (spider) =

Genus of spiders

Ariston is a genus of cribellate orb-weavers first described by Octavius Pickard-Cambridge in 1896.

== Species ==
As of October 2025, this genus includes five species:

- Ariston aglasices Salvatierra, Tourinho & Brescovit, 2014 – Mexico
- Ariston albicans O. Pickard-Cambridge, 1896 – Mexico to Panama (type species)
- Ariston aristus Opell, 1979 – Panama, Colombia
- Ariston mazolus Opell, 1979 – Mexico
- Ariston spartanus Salvatierra, Tourinho & Brescovit, 2014 – Brazil
