= Siratoba =

Scientific classification
- Domain: Eukaryota
- Kingdom: Animalia
- Phylum: Arthropoda
- Subphylum: Chelicerata
- Class: Arachnida
- Order: Araneae
- Infraorder: Araneomorphae
- Family: Uloboridae
- Genus: Siratoba; Opell

Type species
- Siratoba referens

Species
- Siratoba referens (Muma & Gertsch, 1964); Siratoba reticens (Gertsch & Davis, 1942)

Genus of spiders

Siratoba is a genus of spiders in the family Uloboridae. It was first described in 1979 by Opell. As of 2017, it contains 2 species. The two species are Siratoba referens and Siratoba reticens. Siratoba referens were discovered in 1964 at the Dragoon Mountains, AZ, USA, and Siratoba reticins were discovered in 1942 at San Luis Potosí, Mexico.
