= Daramulunia =

Scientific classification
- Domain: Eukaryota
- Kingdom: Animalia
- Phylum: Arthropoda
- Subphylum: Chelicerata
- Class: Arachnida
- Order: Araneae
- Infraorder: Araneomorphae
- Family: Uloboridae
- Genus: Daramulunia; Lehtinen

Type species
- Daramulunia gibbosa

Species
- Daramulunia gibbosa (L. Koch, 1872); Daramulunia tenella (L. Koch, 1872)

Genus of spiders

Daramulunia is a genus of spiders in the family Uloboridae. It was first described in 1967 by Lehtinen. As of 2017, it contains 2 species.
