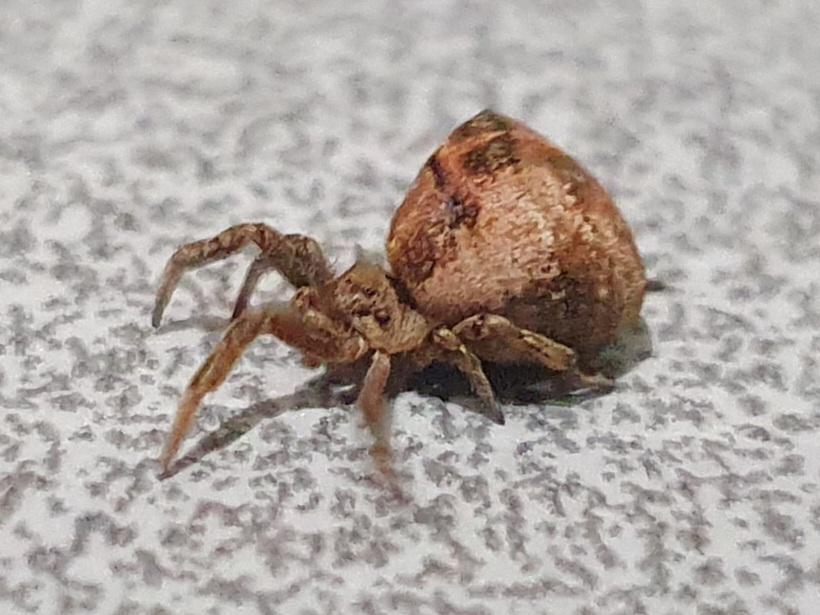
- Female in Belgium

Scientific classification
- Kingdom: Animalia
- Phylum: Arthropoda
- Subphylum: Chelicerata
- Class: Arachnida
- Order: Araneae
- Infraorder: Araneomorphae
- Family: Uloboridae
- Genus: Hyptiotes
- Species: H. paradoxus

Binomial name
- Hyptiotes paradoxus (C. L. Koch, 1834)

Synonyms
- Mithras paradoxus C. L. Koch, 1834; Uptiotes anceps Walckenaer, 1837; Hyptiotes paradoxus — Thorell, 1869 (generic replacement name)

= Hyptiotes paradoxus =

Species of spider

Hyptiotes paradoxus, also known as the triangle spider, is a cribellate orbweaver in the family Uloboridae.

== Description ==
=== Body ===
Adult males have a body length of 3–4 mm (0.12–0.16 in), females 5–6 mm (0.20–0.24 in). The carapace is Broad. It ranges from ginger to dark brown, and has a dense covering of hairs. The abdomen is orange-brown to reddish-brown, with faint black horizontal bands which extend around the sides. It is raised towards the anterior, giving the spider a hunched look, and it may bear a pair of small tubercules on the anterior side. The male has a darker and more cylindrical abdomen than the female, and it lacks the raised anterior. They have short, stout legs, which are coloured as the carapace. Mature males have extremely large pedipalps, similar in size to the carapace.

=== Eye arrangement ===
They have eight eyes in two rows, with the posterior row distributed across the midline of the carapace, and the anterior row halfway between the posterior row and anterior edge. The anterior median eyes are close together, and distant from the anterior lateral eyes; the posterior medians are spaced apart, with the posterior laterals on tubules on the side of the carapace, around halfway back.

== Distribution and habitat ==
The species is found in Europe, Turkey and the Caucasus. In Europe, it is found in Lithuania and Latvia. It is also found in Estonia (Saaremaa and mainland) and Finland (Åland), and, scarcely, in South England.

They live primarily in shrubs and evergreen trees, however they have also been found in deciduous trees.

== Behaviour ==
=== Web ===
The web is triangular, and consists of four radial threads connected by cribellate silk. It is kept taut by the spider holding onto one corner. When an insect is caught, the spider repeatedly loosens and tightens the web until the prey is tangled.

=== Reproduction ===
Males reach sexual maturity in early autumn. Due to their small eyes, they must rely on the female's cribellate silk dragline, which the female coats in a pheromone, and courtship is mainly based on vibrations sent across the web.
