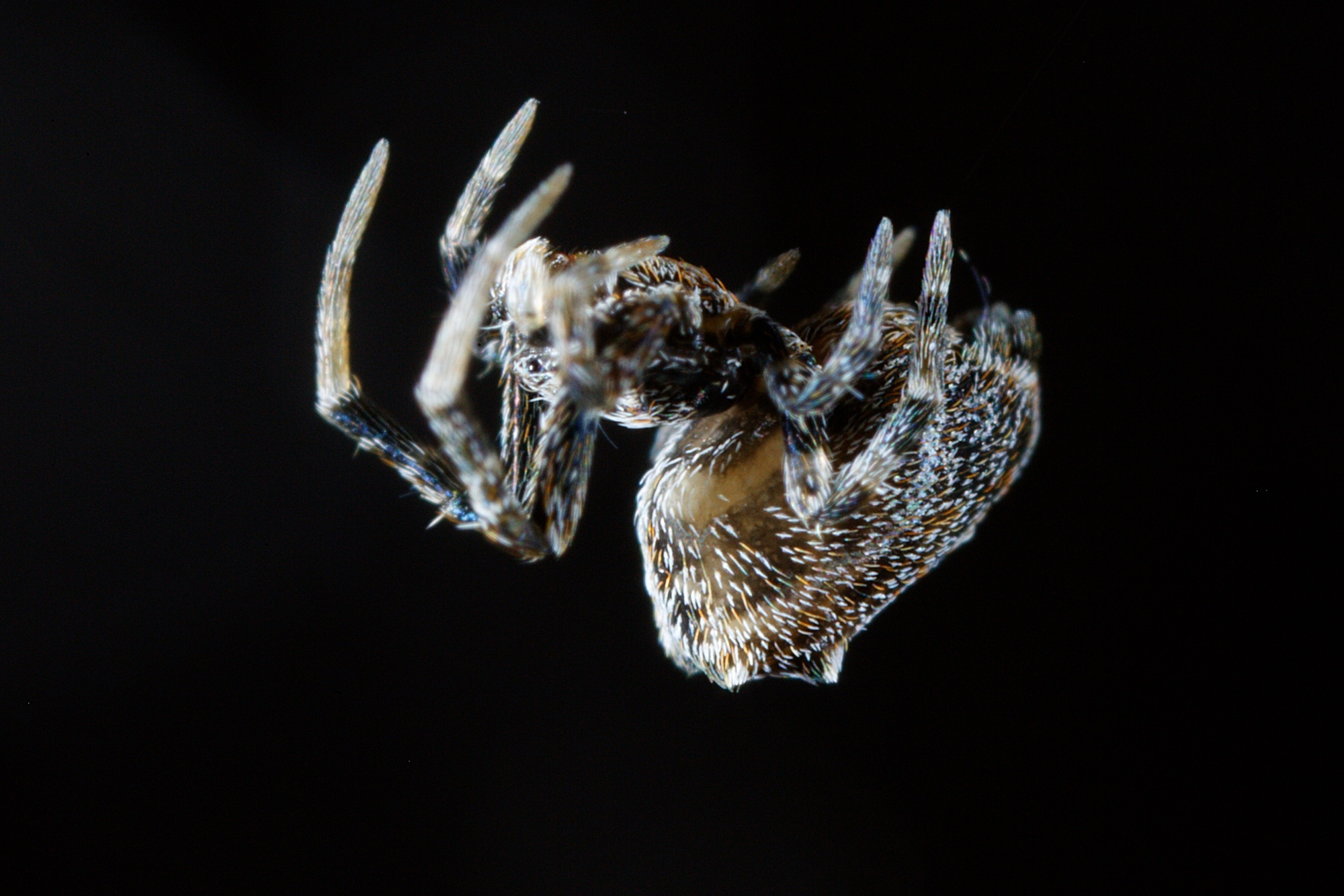

Scientific classification
- Domain: Eukaryota
- Kingdom: Animalia
- Phylum: Arthropoda
- Subphylum: Chelicerata
- Class: Arachnida
- Order: Araneae
- Infraorder: Araneomorphae
- Family: Uloboridae
- Genus: Philoponella
- Species: P. congregabilis

Binomial name
- Philoponella congregabilis (Rainbow, 1916)

Synonyms
- Uloborus congregabilis Rainbow, 1916

= Philoponella congregabilis =

Little humped spider

Species of spider

Philoponella congregabilis, sometimes referred to as the little humped spider, is an Australian species of communal spider that, like other species of Uloboridae, does not use venom. Instead it wraps its prey in spider silk to crush it to death. The spider then goes on to regurgitate digestive fluid into the shroud, then consuming the pre-digested liquid. The specific name congregabilis translates to "community dwellers". The generic name Philoponella alludes to their industrious nature, "loving labour".

== Description ==
The male is up to 3.5 millimetres (1/8 in) long, the female 6 millimetres (1/4 in). Colour varies, from pale cream to a darker orange or brown. The abdomen features a prominent hump.

== Web ==
These small spiders build untidy looking orb webs, connected to other webs in a community with others of the same species. Webs are not upright, being horizontal or sloping. Debris often litters the communal web, making observation of the spider difficult. The habitat is often eaves or window sills in houses, garages or sheds. The more natural habitat is shady places such as low shrubbery. Food is small arthropods, mostly insects.

== Habitat ==
Found natively in New South Wales, P. congregabilis is (as of 18 January 2021) one of 73 spider species - and specifically 50 Australians - established in New Zealand. P. congregabilis has been introduced to the Christchurch area.

== Egg sac and juveniles ==
The female produces an egg sac around 9 millimetres (3/8 in) long and fairly flat and elongate in shape. The outer covering is grey or brown of a rough texture. The egg sacs are suspended in the communal web, tapering at the ends and having several lateral points. It may be mistaken for vegetative debris or digested food. They contain around 20 small spherical non-sticky eggs. Juveniles stay in the community web for a relatively long period, often joining the community of spiders or moving to form a new colony.

== Taxonomy ==
The species was described as Uloborus congregabilis by Rainbow in 1916 from a specimen from New South Wales. It was transferred to the genus Philoponella by Lehtinen in 1967.
