= Polenecia =

Scientific classification
- Kingdom: Animalia
- Phylum: Arthropoda
- Subphylum: Chelicerata
- Class: Arachnida
- Order: Araneae
- Infraorder: Araneomorphae
- Family: Uloboridae
- Genus: Polenecia
- Species: P. producta

Binomial name
- Polenecia producta (Simon, 1873)

Genus of spiders

Polenecia is a genus of spiders in the family Uloboridae. It was first described in 1967 by Lehtinen. As of 2017, it contains only one species, Polenecia producta, with a range of "Mediterranean to Azerbaijan".
