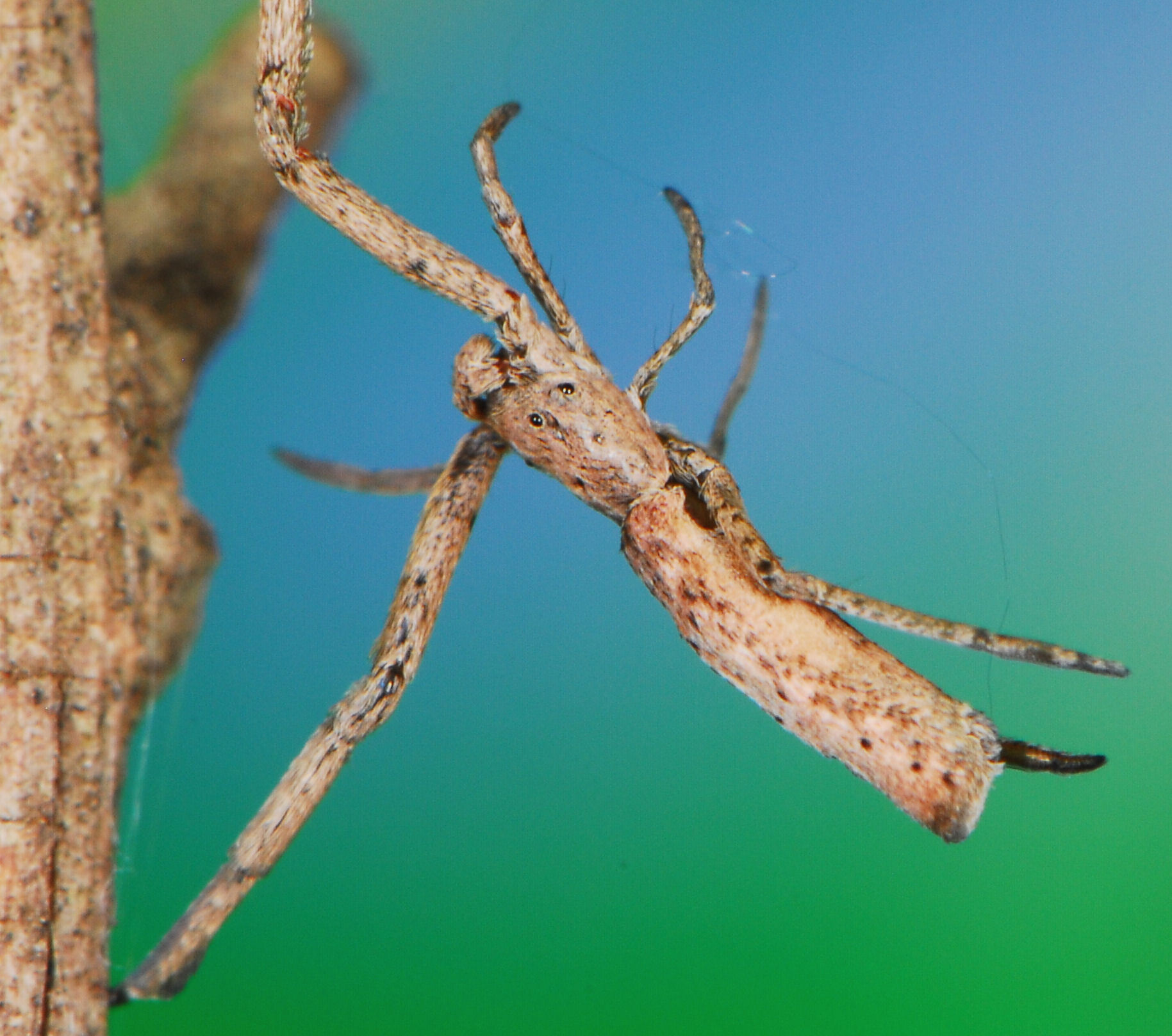
- Female
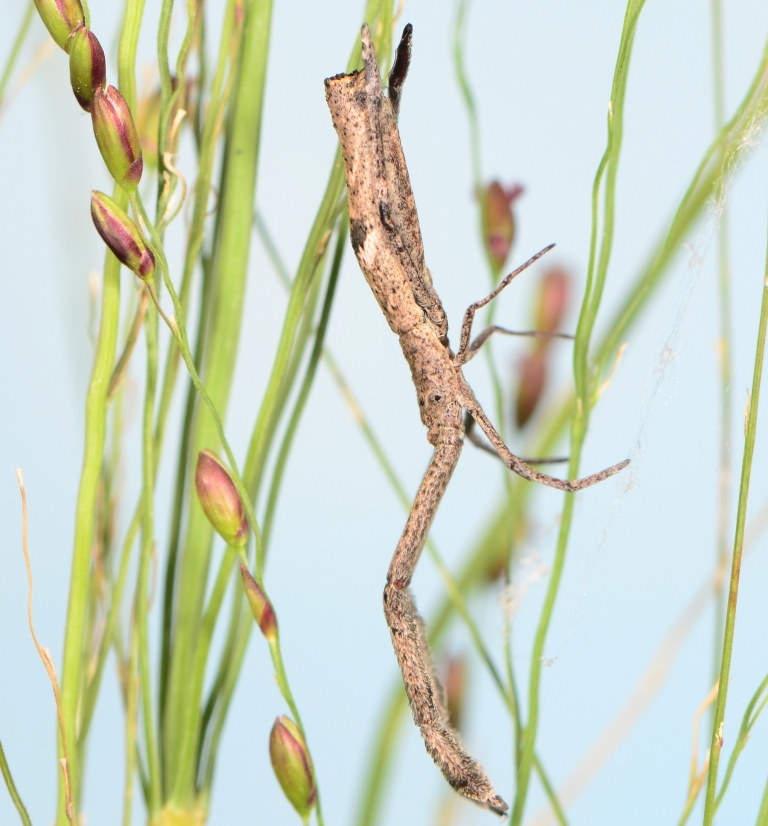
- Female

Scientific classification
- Kingdom: Animalia
- Phylum: Arthropoda
- Subphylum: Chelicerata
- Class: Arachnida
- Order: Araneae
- Infraorder: Araneomorphae
- Family: Uloboridae
- Genus: Miagrammopes
- Species: M. brevicaudus

Binomial name
- Miagrammopes brevicaudus O. Pickard-Cambridge, 1882

Synonyms
- Miagrammopes brevicauda O. Pickard-Cambridge, 1882

= Miagrammopes brevicaudus =

Two-spotted Single-Line Web Spider

Species of spider

Miagrammopes brevicaudus is a species of spider in the family Uloboridae. It is a southern African endemic commonly known as the two-spotted single-line web spider.

== Distribution ==
Miagrammopes brevicaudus is found in Eswatini and South Africa.

In South Africa, the species has been recorded from the provinces Eastern Cape, Gauteng, KwaZulu-Natal, Limpopo, Mpumalanga, North West, and Western Cape. Notable localities include Addo Elephant National Park, iSimangaliso Wetland Park, Blouberg Nature Reserve, Nylsvley Nature Reserve, Lekgalameetse Nature Reserve, Marakele National Park, Kruger National Park, De Hoop Nature Reserve, and Karoo National Park.

== Habitat and ecology ==
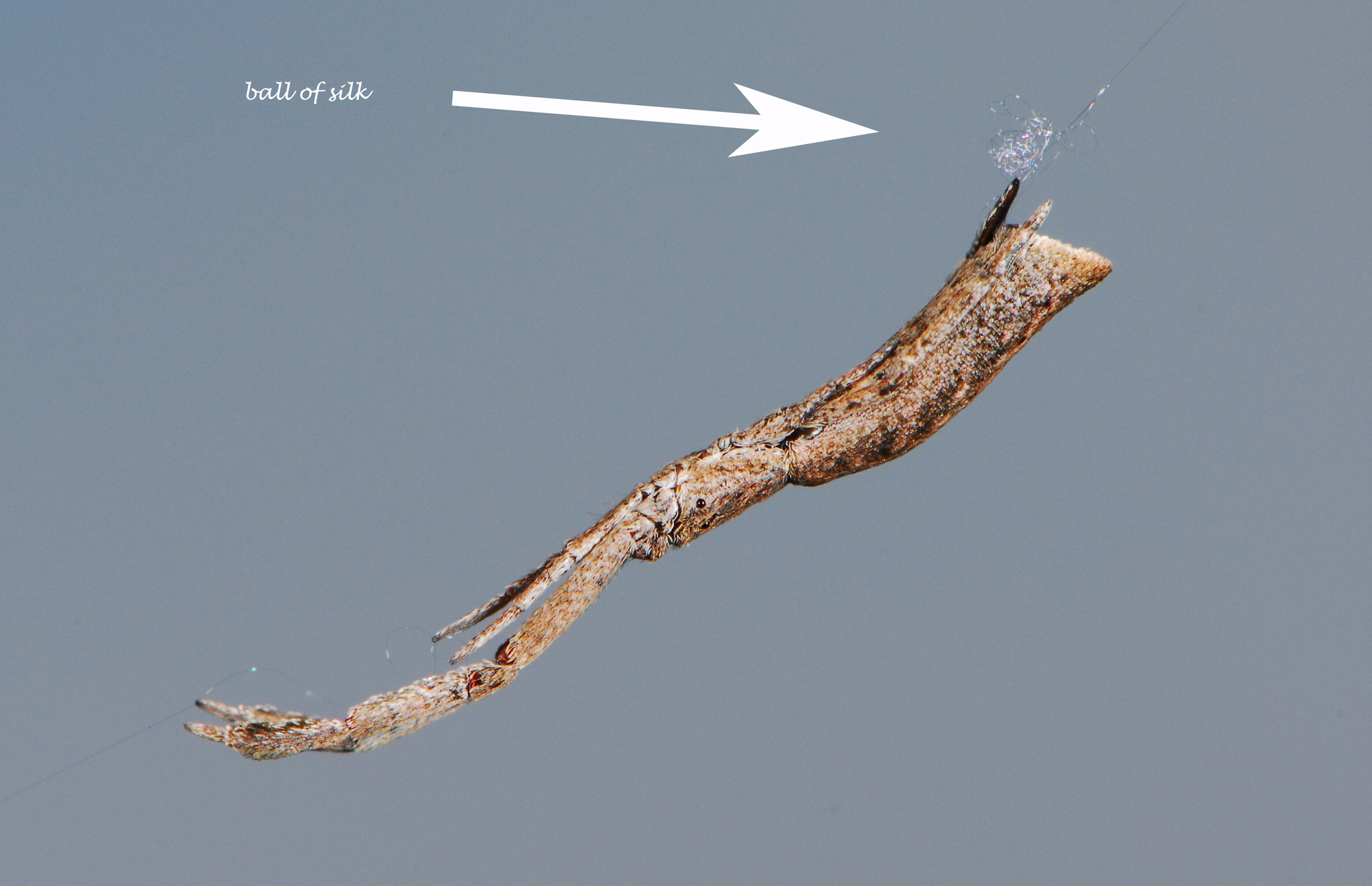
showing ball of silk

Miagrammopes brevicaudus constructs a horizontal web, usually a single line between two branches or twigs, with only the central section consisting of cribellate silk. The web has one or a few sticky capture threads that are held under tension and released when prey is close to the line. The attack behaviour consists of rapid jerking and sudden sagging of the catch thread. The spider rests at the end of one of the lines and will only approach the centre as darkness sets in.

The webs are made in vegetation and the species has been sampled from all the floral biomes at altitudes ranging from 15 to 1758 m.

== Description ==
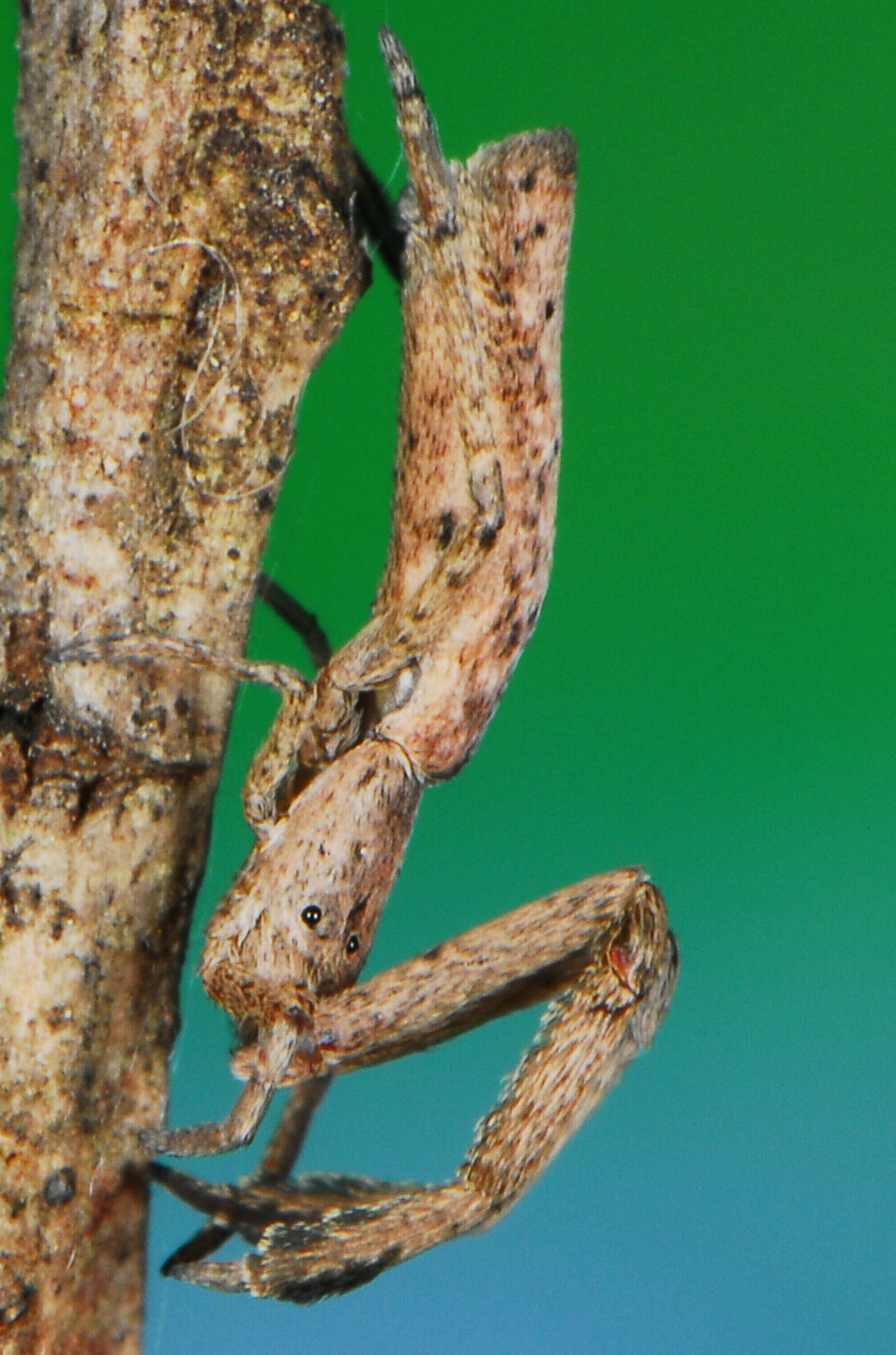

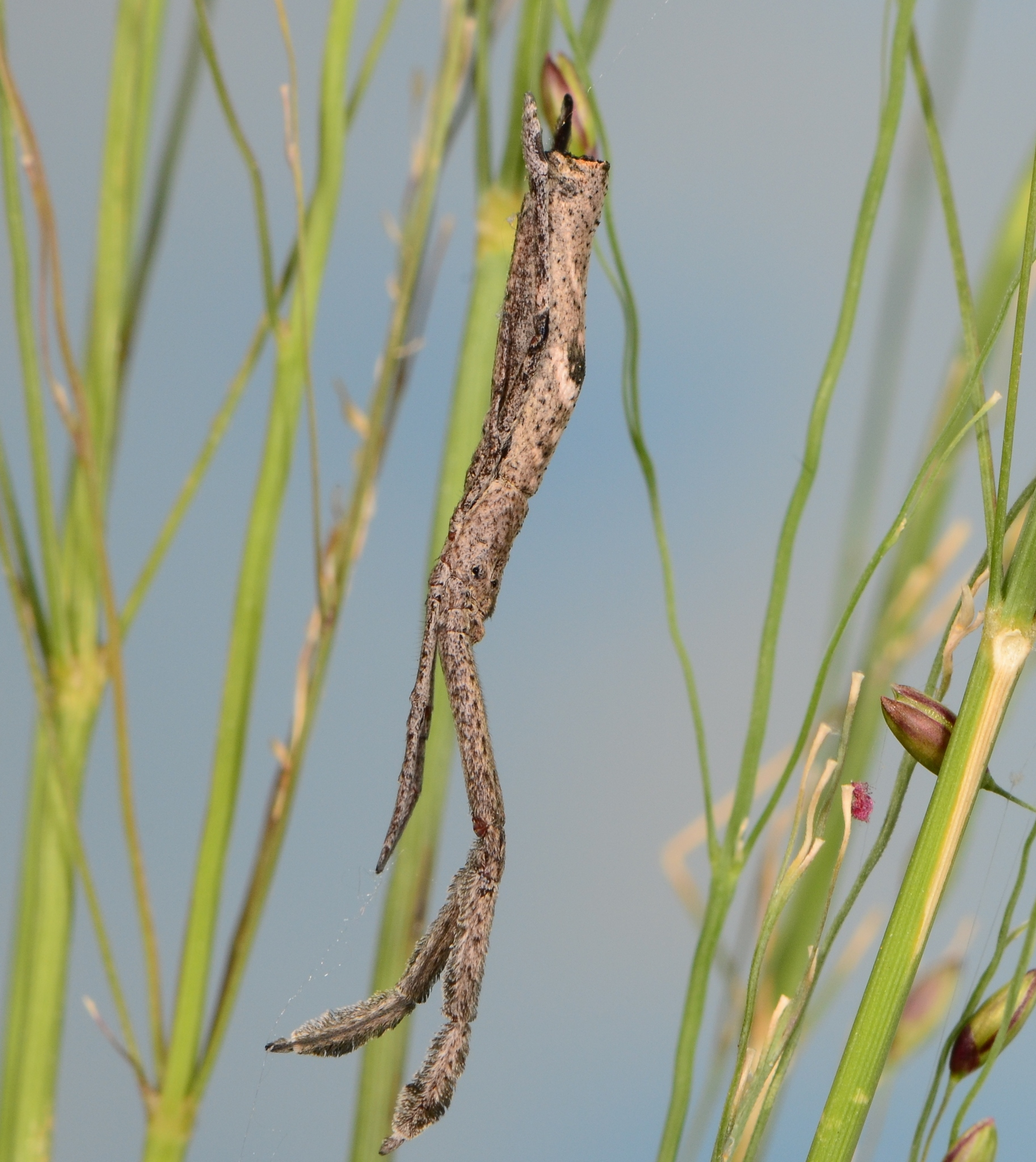

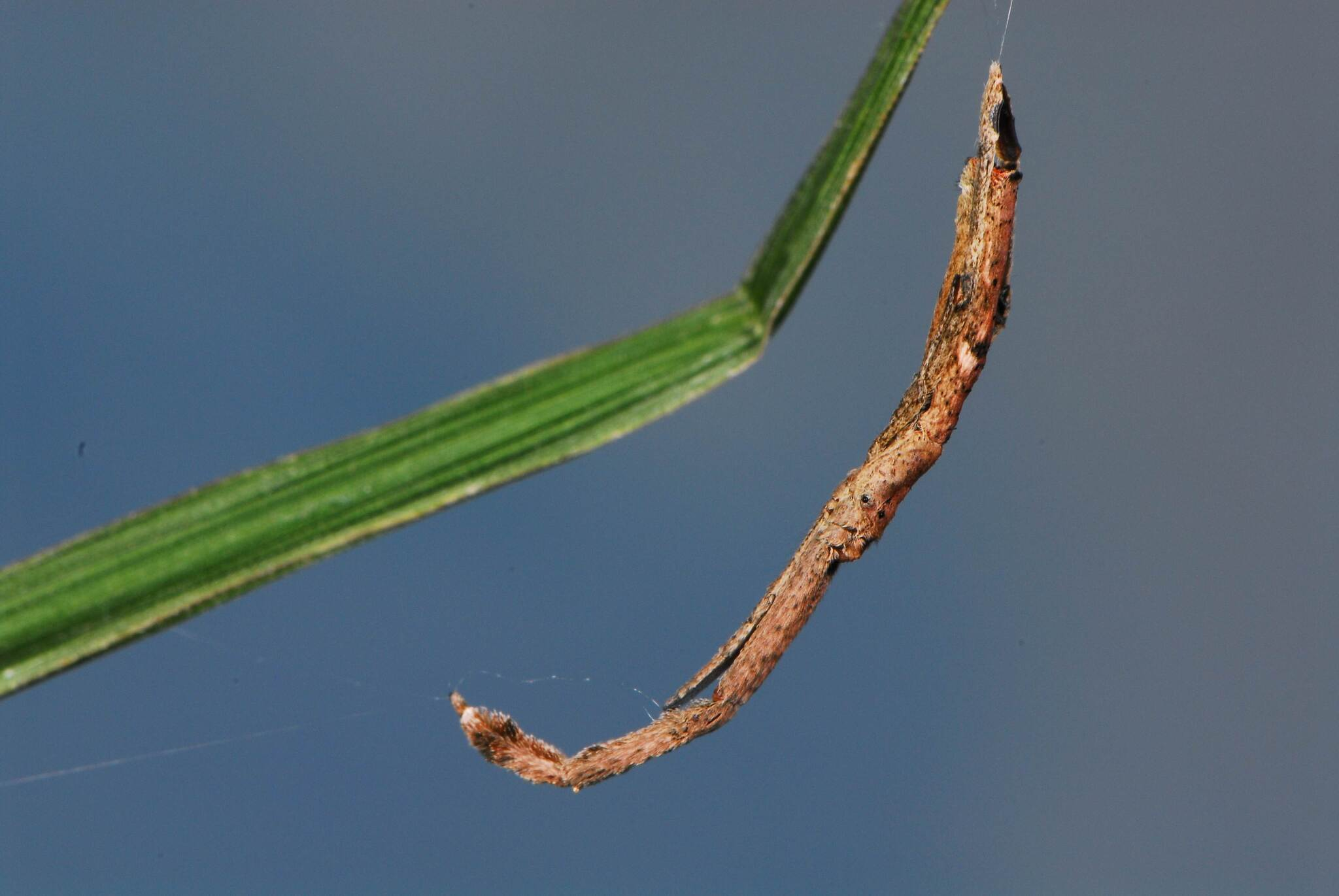

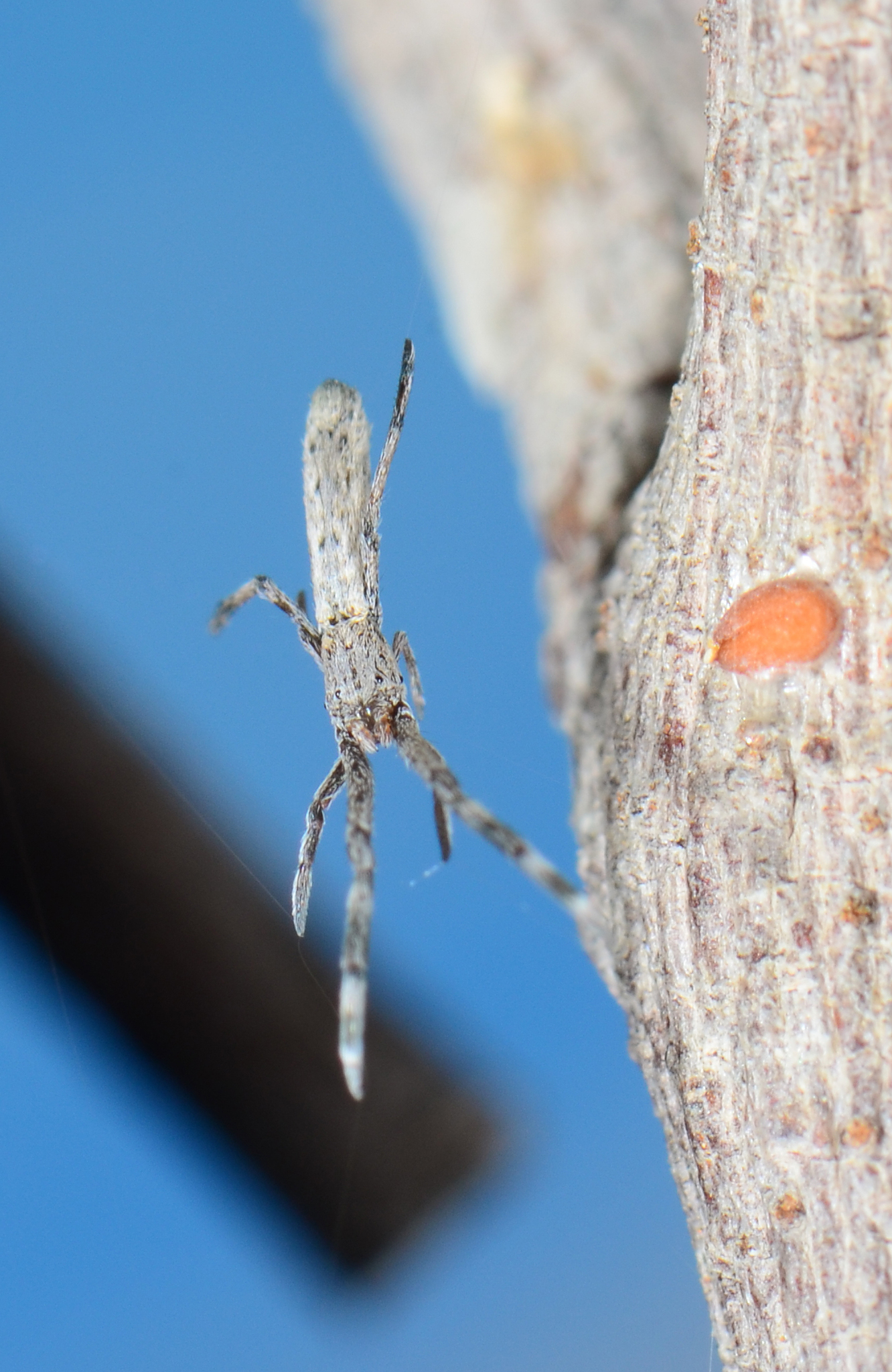

== Conservation ==
Miagrammopes brevicaudus is listed as Least Concern by the South African National Biodiversity Institute due to its wide geographical range. The species is protected in several areas including Addo Elephant National Park, Tembe Elephant Park, Blouberg Nature Reserve, Nylsvley Nature Reserve, Luvhondo Nature Reserve and Marakele National Park.

== Taxonomy ==
Miagrammopes brevicaudus was described by O. Pickard-Cambridge in 1882 with the type locality given only as Caffraria. The species has not been revised and is known only from females.
