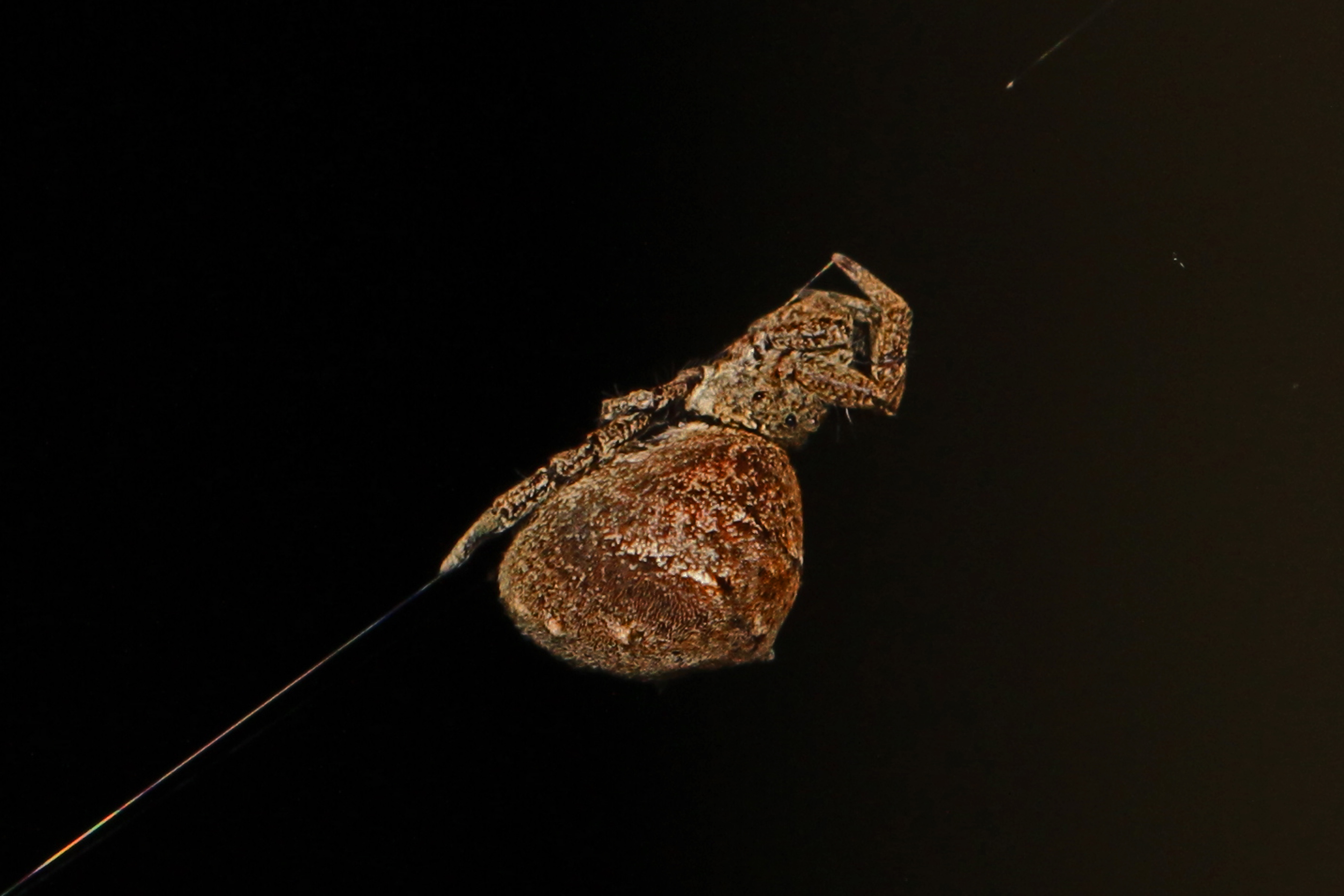

Scientific classification
- Domain: Eukaryota
- Kingdom: Animalia
- Phylum: Arthropoda
- Subphylum: Chelicerata
- Class: Arachnida
- Order: Araneae
- Infraorder: Araneomorphae
- Family: Uloboridae
- Genus: Hyptiotes
- Species: H. cavatus

Binomial name
- Hyptiotes cavatus (Hentz, 1847)

= Hyptiotes cavatus =

Species of spider

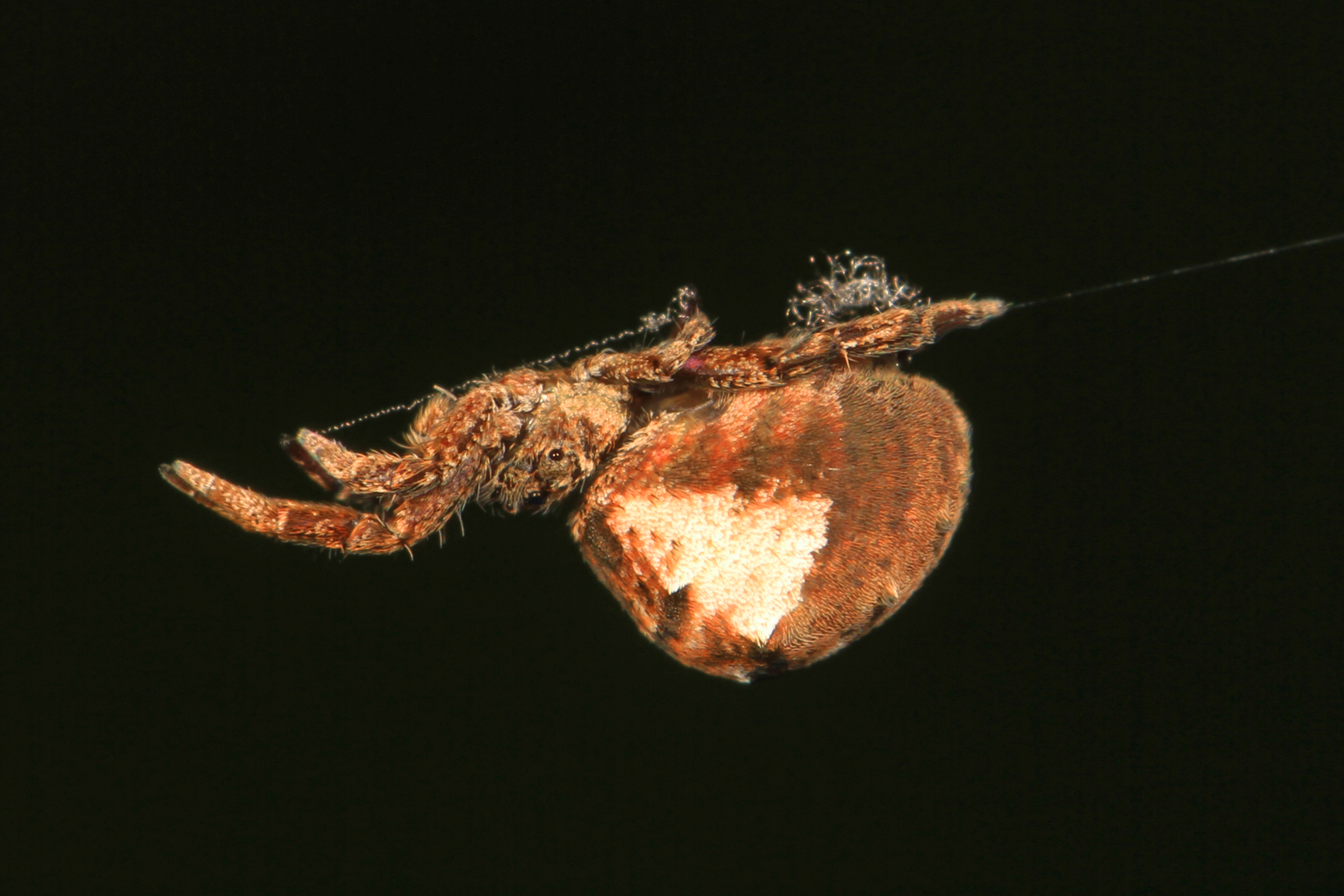
Triangle weaver, Hyptiotes cavatus

Hyptiotes cavatus, the triangle weaver, is a species of cribellate orb weaver in the family of spiders known as Uloboridae. It is found in the eastern United States and Canada.

This spider makes use of its triangle-shaped web in a unique fashion compared to most orb-weaving spiders. Using its body as a bridge between an anchor line and the main trap line of the web, it uses its legs to reel in the silk leading to the rest of the web to increase tension within the structure. It waits until prey makes contact with the web, then releases the held anchor line, causing the web (and the spider) to spring forwards 2-3 cm at high speed. This causes up to 4 additional web strands to touch the prey, and the sudden stop when the web reaches the end of its elasticity then winds the prey further into the strands. This process uses stored elastic potential in a manner similar to human tools like the slingshot or the bow and arrow.

Hyptiotes cavatus has only six functional eyes. The anterior lateral eyes (ALE) are extremely small and vestigial, with no retinas.
