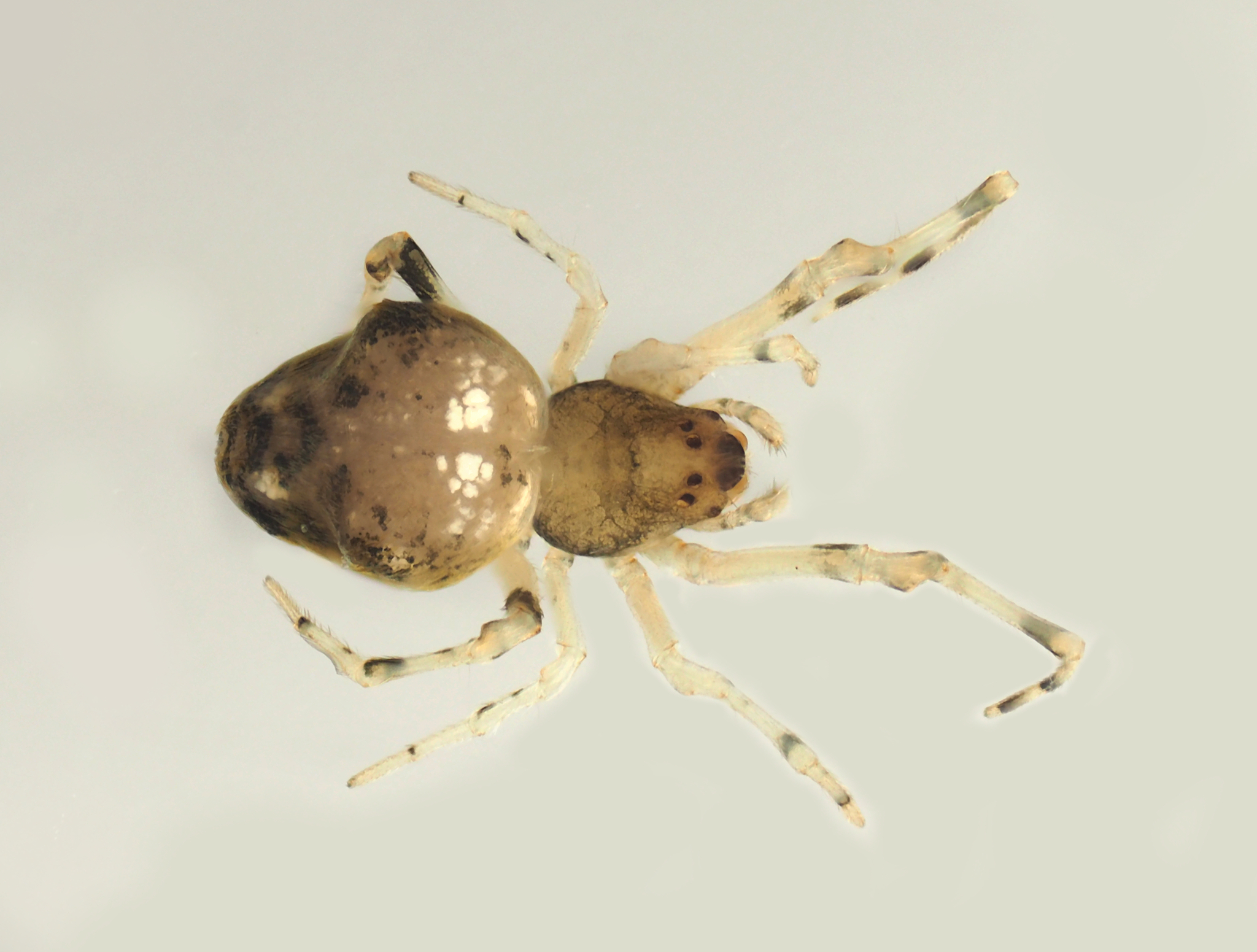

Scientific classification
- Domain: Eukaryota
- Kingdom: Animalia
- Phylum: Arthropoda
- Subphylum: Chelicerata
- Class: Arachnida
- Order: Araneae
- Infraorder: Araneomorphae
- Family: Uloboridae
- Genus: Purumitra; Lehtinen

Type species
- Purumitra grammica

Species
- Purumitra australiensis Opell, 1995; Purumitra grammica (Simon, 1893)

= Purumitra =

Genus of spiders

Purumitra is a genus of spiders in the family Uloboridae. It was first described in 1967 by Lehtinen. As of 2017, it contains 2 species.
