= Sybota =

Scientific classification
- Kingdom: Animalia
- Phylum: Arthropoda
- Subphylum: Chelicerata
- Class: Arachnida
- Order: Araneae
- Infraorder: Araneomorphae
- Family: Uloboridae
- Genus: Sybota; Simon, 1892

Species
- See text

Genus of spiders

Sybota is a genus of uloborid spiders, found in Chile and Argentina.

== Species ==
As of March 2022 it contains six species:

- Sybota abdominalis (Nicolet, 1849) – Chile
- Sybota atlantica Grismado, 2001 – Argentina
- Sybota compagnuccii Grismado, 2007 – Argentina
- Sybota mendozae Opell, 1979 – Argentina
- Sybota osornis Opell, 1979 – Chile
- Sybota rana (Mello-Leitão, 1941) (type) – Argentina
