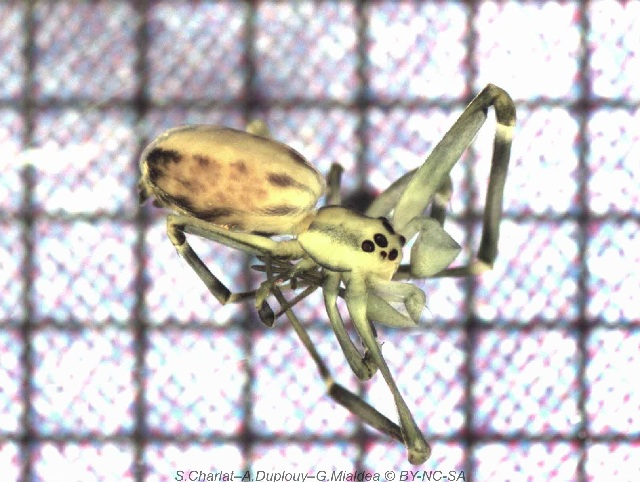
- L. tahitiensis

Scientific classification
- Domain: Eukaryota
- Kingdom: Animalia
- Phylum: Arthropoda
- Subphylum: Chelicerata
- Class: Arachnida
- Order: Araneae
- Infraorder: Araneomorphae
- Family: Uloboridae
- Genus: Lehtineniana; Sherwood, 2022

Type species
- L. tahitiensis (Berland, 1934)

Species
- 5, see text

Synonyms
- Tangaroa Lehtinen, 1967

= Lehtineniana =

Genus of spiders

Lehtineniana is a genus of South Pacific cribellate orb-weavers first described by Danniella Sherwood in 2022. It is named in honor of Pekka T. Lehtinen. It was formerly known as Tangaroa, and renamed after this was found to be a junior homonym of the rhabdocoel flatworm genus Tangaroa, prompting its replacement.

== Species ==
As of July 2022 it contains five species:

- Lehtineniana beattyi (Opell, 1983) — Caroline Is.
- Lehtineniana dissimilis (Berland, 1924) — Vanuatu, New Caledonia
- Lehtineniana pukapukan (Salvatierra, Brescovit & Tourinho, 2015) — Cook Is.
- Lehtineniana tahitiensis (Berland, 1934) — French Polynesia (Marquesas Is., Society Is., Austral Is.)
- Lehtineniana vaka (Salvatierra, Brescovit & Tourinho, 2015) — Cook Is.
