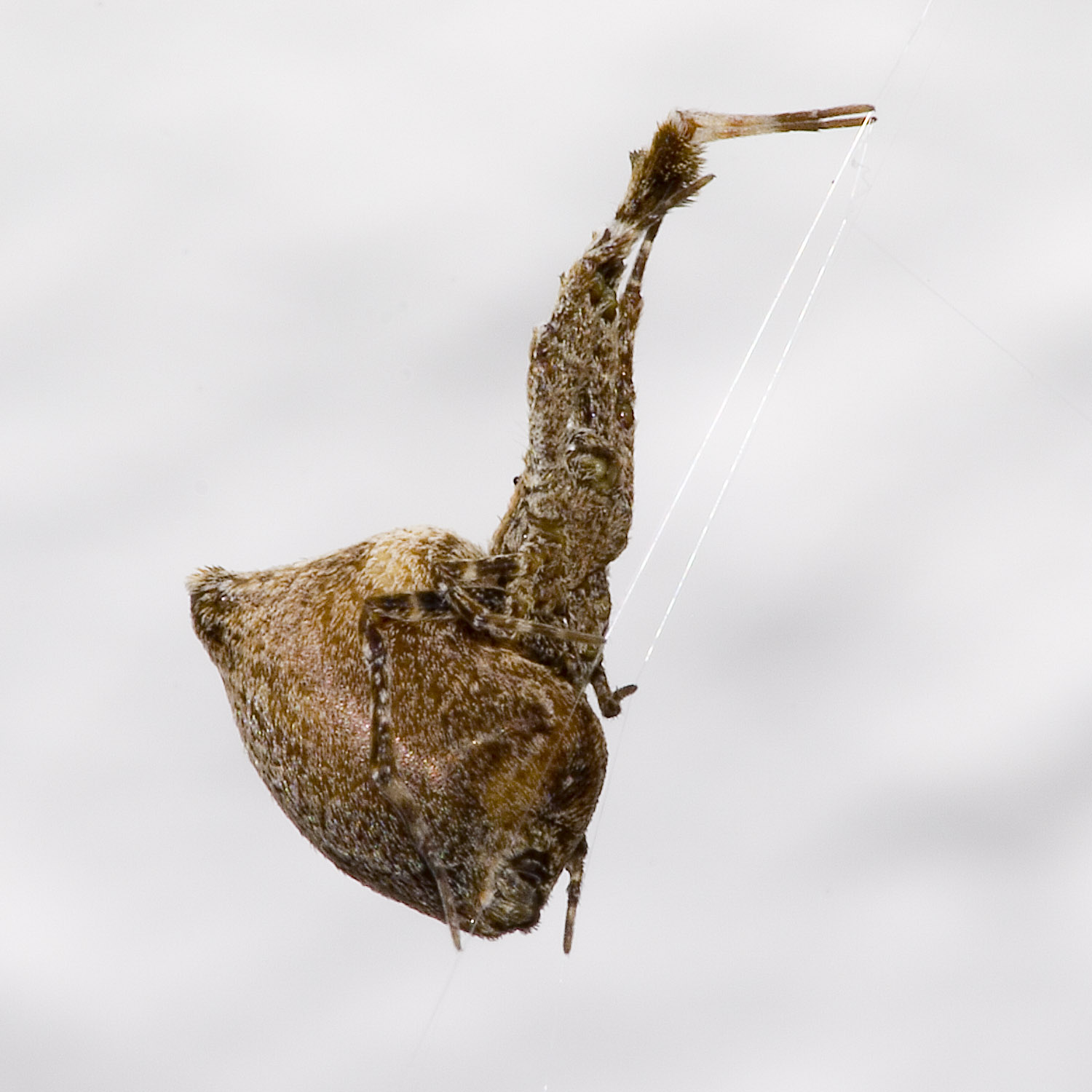
- Uloborus plumipes

Scientific classification
- Kingdom: Animalia
- Phylum: Arthropoda
- Subphylum: Chelicerata
- Class: Arachnida
- Order: Araneae
- Infraorder: Araneomorphae
- Family: Uloboridae; Thorell, 1869

Diversity
- 20 genera, 284 species
- blue: reported countries (WSC) green: observation hotspots (iNaturalist)

= Uloboridae =

Cribellate orb-weavers Temporal range: Tithonian–present

Family of spiders

Uloboridae is a family of non-venomous spiders, known as cribellate orb weavers or hackled orb weavers. Their lack of venom glands is a secondarily evolved trait. Instead, they wrap their prey thoroughly in silk, cover it in regurgitated digestive enzymes, and then ingest the liquified body.

== Description ==
They are medium to large spiders, with three claws, which lack venomous glands. They build a spiral web using cribellate silk, which is quite fuzzy. They are usually dull in color and are able to camouflage well into their surroundings. They typically have a humped opisthosoma, which is notoriously more humped than the carapace. Their rear eyes tend to curve, more so in some species than others. Most uloborid spiders have eight eyes, but the genus Miagrammopes has only four.

== Hunting ==
The hunting method of these spiders is quite unique among all animals in the kingdom. These spiders do not use an adhesive on their orb webs, but rather the very fine cribellate fibers on each strand of silk tend to ensnare prey. Since newly hatched uloborids lack the cribellum needed to produce cribellate sticky silk, their webs have a fundamentally different structure with a large number of fine radii, but no sticky spiral. Some spiders only build a single line web, while others make more complex webs. They lack venom glands, which is very rare among spiders. They first catch their prey, using their silk. They wrap their prey, and severely compress it, then they cover the prey with digestive fluid. Oddly enough, their mouthparts never touch the prey. The spider starts ingesting as soon as the prey has been covered. It is thought that robust hairs protect the spider from the digestive fluids. It is unknown how this behavior first evolved.

== Social behavior ==
Some species are able to form colonies like Philoponella congregabilis, which make large, messy, communal webs. Colonies may range from a couple of individuals to a couple hundred. These colonies may be nymph dominated or adult dominated, though a small colony dominated by adults could be a sign of the colony's slow death. These colonies show signs of being female dominated, as one would expect, with males only being found in larger colonies. This could mean males search for larger colonies, or had died out in the smaller colonies.

== Distribution ==
This family has an almost worldwide distribution. Only two species are known from Northern Europe: Uloborus walckenaerius and Hyptiotes paradoxus. The oldest known fossil species is Talbragaraneus from the Late Jurassic (Tithonian) Talbragar Fossil Bed of Australia.

== Genera ==
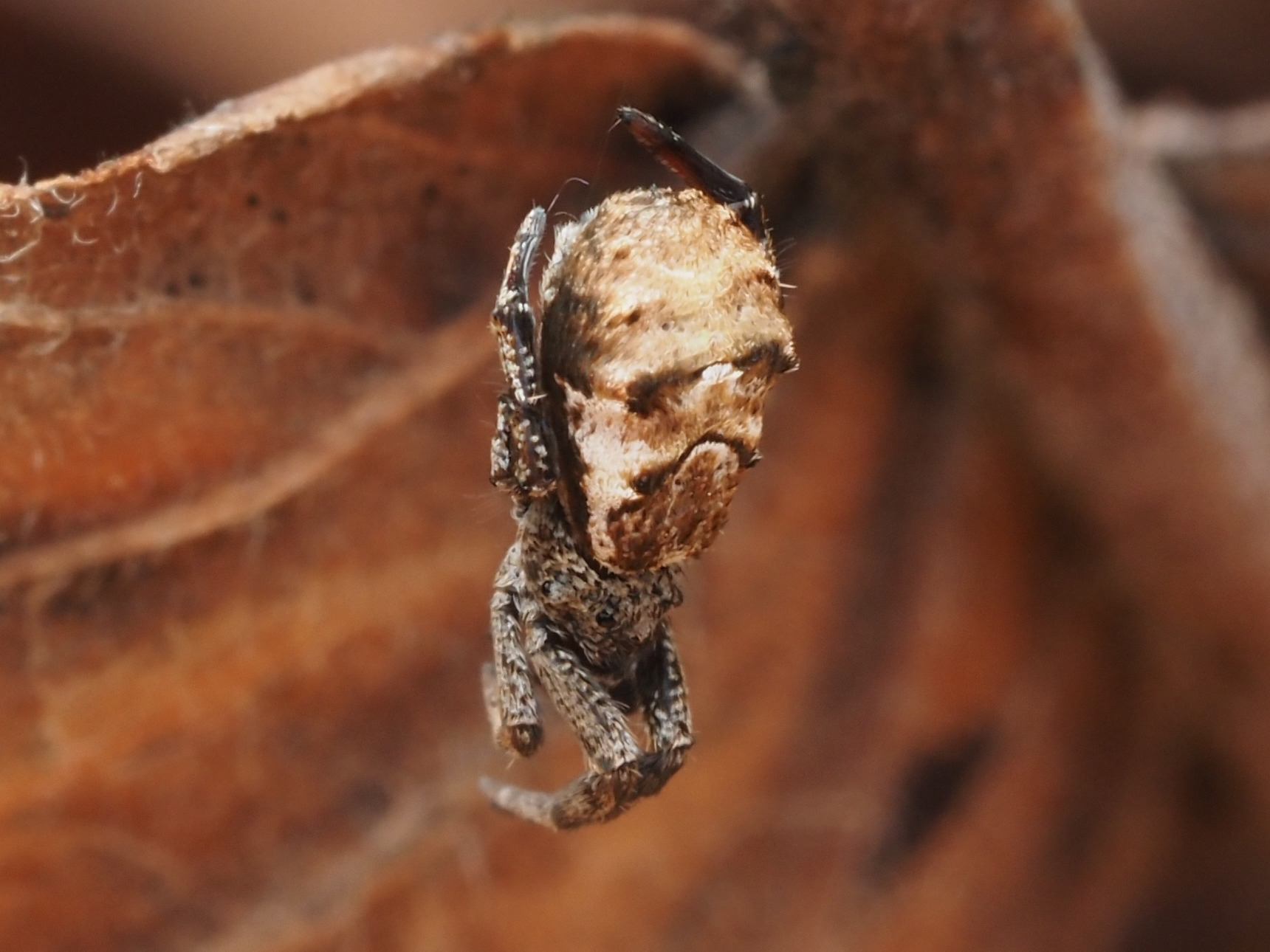
Hyptiotes cavatus

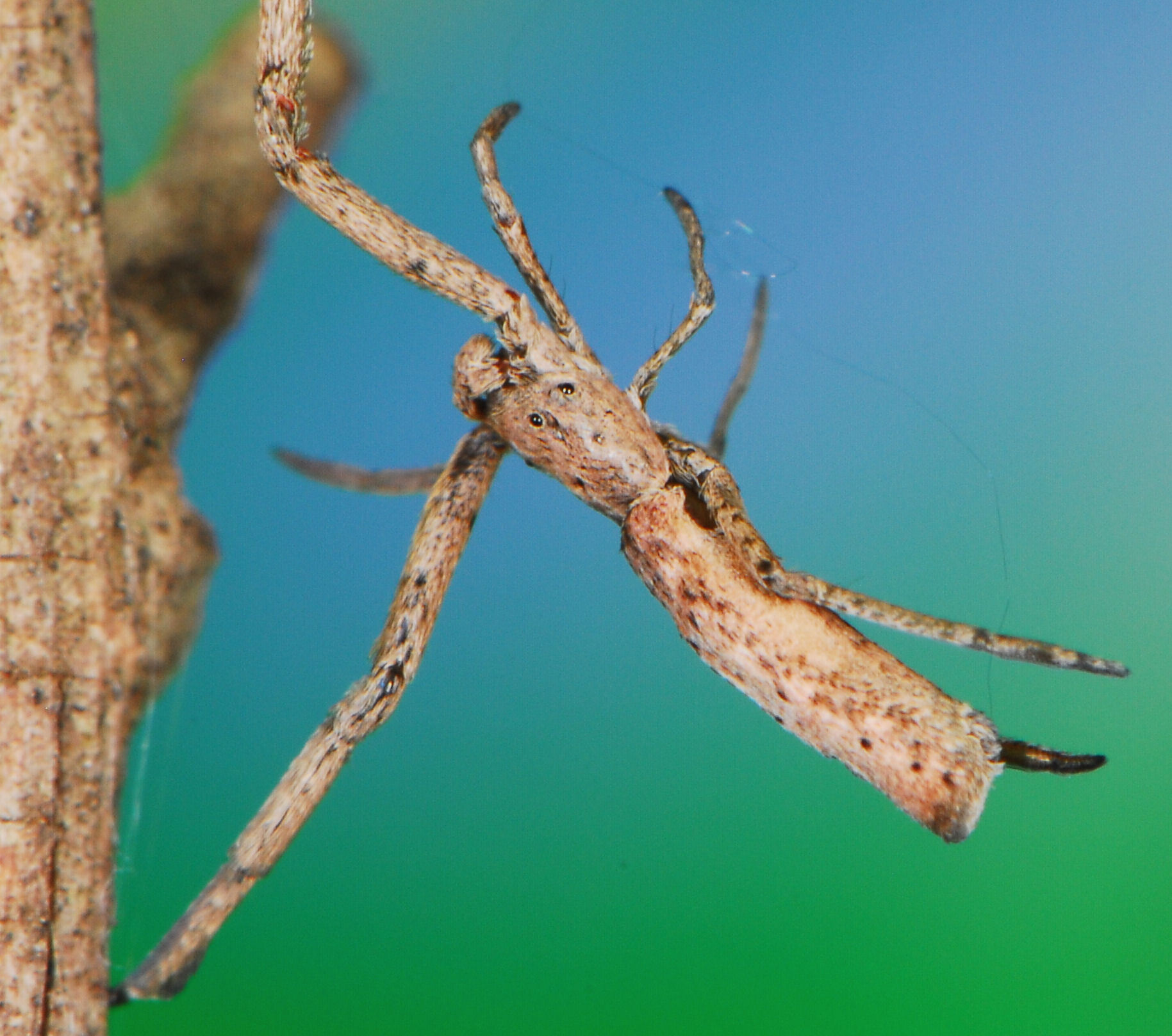
Miagrammopes brevicaudus

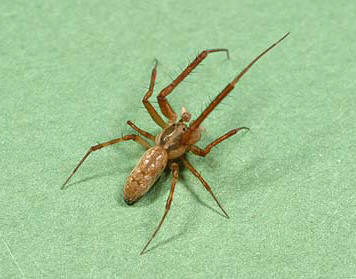
Octonoba

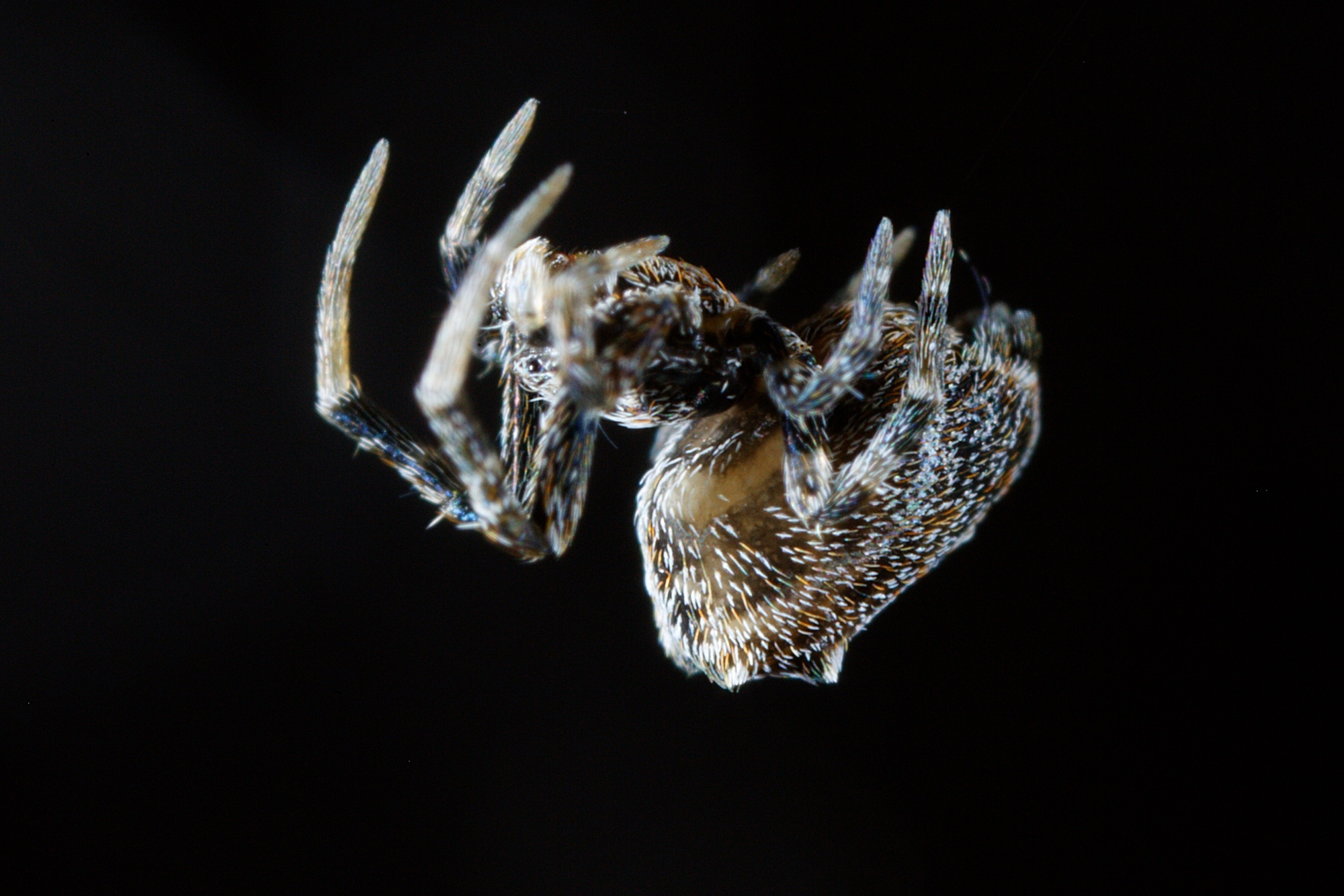
Philoponella congregabilis

As of January 2026, this family includes twenty genera and 284 species:

- Anatoborus Milledge, 2025 – Australia
- Ariston O. Pickard-Cambridge, 1896 – Panama, Mexico, Brazil, Colombia
- Astavakra Lehtinen, 1967 – Philippines
- Conifaber Opell, 1982 – South America
- Daramulunia Lehtinen, 1967 – Fiji, Vanuatu, Samoa
- Hyptiotes Walckenaer, 1837 – Algeria, Tunisia, South Africa, Asia, Madeira, Russia, Greece, France, North America
- Lehtineniana Sherwood, 2022 – New Caledonia, Vanuatu, Cook Islands, French Polynesia, Caroline Islands
- Lubinella Opell, 1984 – New Guinea
- Miagrammopes O. Pickard-Cambridge, 1870 – Mauritius, Tanzania, Eswatini, South Africa, Asia, North America, Australia, Papua New Guinea, South America
- Octonoba Opell, 1979 – Eastern Asia, Caucasus, Russia. Introduced to United States
- Orinomana Strand, 1934 – South America
- Philoponella Mello-Leitão, 1917 – Angola, South Africa, Ivory Coast, Asia, Mexico, Costa Rica, United States, South America, Australia. Introduced to New Zealand
- Polenecia Lehtinen, 1967 – Mediterranean to Azerbaijan
- Purumitra Lehtinen, 1967 – Philippines, Australia, Caroline Islands
- Siratoba Opell, 1979 – Mexico, United States
- Sybota Simon, 1892 – Argentina, Chile
- Uaitemuri Santos & Gonzaga, 2017 – Brazil
- Uloborus Latreille, 1806 – Worldwide
- Waitkera Opell, 1979 – New Zealand
- Zosis Walckenaer, 1841 – Brazil, Galapagos, Guyana, Timor. Introduced worldwide
