= List of moths of Liberia =

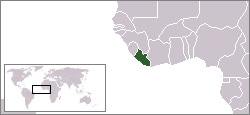
Location of Liberia

There are about 83 known moth species of Liberia. The moths (mostly nocturnal) and butterflies (mostly diurnal) together make up the taxonomic order Lepidoptera.

This is a list of moth species which have been recorded in Liberia.

== Arctiidae ==
- Alpenus maculosa (Stoll, 1781)
- Amerila brunnea (Hampson, 1901)
- Amerila luteibarba (Hampson, 1901)
- Balacra caeruleifascia Walker, 1856
- Balacra ehrmanni (Holland, 1893)
- Balacra elegans Aurivillius, 1892
- Ceryx hilda (Ehrmann, 1894)
- Creatonotos leucanioides Holland, 1893
- Metarctia metaleuca Hampson, 1914
- Muxta xanthopa (Holland, 1893)
- Neuroxena flammea (Schaus, 1893)
- Nyctemera apicalis (Walker, 1854)
- Spilosoma aurantiaca (Holland, 1893)
- Spilosoma rava (Druce, 1898)
- Spilosoma sulphurea Bartel, 1903

== Cossidae ==
- Macrocossus caducus Clench, 1959

== Drepanidae ==
- Epicampoptera strandi Bryk, 1913
- Negera bimaculata (Holland, 1893)
- Spidia fenestrata Butler, 1878

== Geometridae ==
- Traminda vividaria (Walker, 1861)
- Zamarada anna D. S. Fletcher, 1974
- Zamarada antimima D. S. Fletcher, 1974
- Zamarada bicuspida D. S. Fletcher, 1974
- Zamarada corroborata Herbulot, 1954
- Zamarada cucharita D. S. Fletcher, 1974
- Zamarada dolorosa D. S. Fletcher, 1974
- Zamarada dyscapna D. S. Fletcher, 1974
- Zamarada eucharis (Drury, 1782)
- Zamarada euphrosyne Oberthür, 1912
- Zamarada ilaria Swinhoe, 1904
- Zamarada indicata D. S. Fletcher, 1974
- Zamarada ixiaria Swinhoe, 1904
- Zamarada leona Gaede, 1915
- Zamarada lepta D. S. Fletcher, 1974
- Zamarada paxilla D. S. Fletcher, 1974
- Zamarada perlepidata (Walker, 1863)
- Zamarada platycephala D. S. Fletcher, 1974
- Zamarada regularis D. S. Fletcher, 1974
- Zamarada subinterrupta Gaede, 1915

== Lasiocampidae ==
- Cheligium sansei Zolotuhin & Gurkovich, 2009
- Euphorea ondulosa (Conte, 1909)
- Filiola dogma Zolotuhin & Gurkovich, 2009
- Gelo jordani (Tams, 1936)
- Gonopacha brotoessa (Holland, 1893)
- Leipoxais siccifolia Aurivillius, 1902
- Mallocampa leucophaea (Holland, 1893)
- Odontocheilopteryx phoneus Hering, 1928
- Pachyna subfascia (Walker, 1855)
- Pachytrina gliharta Zolotuhin & Gurkovich, 2009
- Pseudometa pagetodes Tams, 1929
- Sonitha libera (Aurivillius, 1914)

== Lymantriidae ==
- Dasychira castor Hering, 1926
- Rahona watsoni Dall'Asta, 1981

== Noctuidae ==
- Achaea ezea (Cramer, 1779)
- Asota speciosa (Drury, 1773)
- Heraclia geryon (Fabricius, 1781)
- Phaegorista leucomelas (Herrich-Schäffer, 1855)

== Notodontidae ==
- Eurystaura obscura Gaede, 1928
- Tricholoba squalidula Strand, 1911

== Psychidae ==
- Eumeta cervina Druce, 1887
- Eumeta salae Heylaerts, 1884

== Pterophoridae ==
- Agdistis tamaricis (Zeller, 1847)
- Megalorhipida leucodactylus (Fabricius, 1794)

== Saturniidae ==
- Epiphora boolana Strand, 1909

== Sphingidae ==
- Avinoffia hollandi (Clark, 1917)
- Hippotion irregularis (Walker, 1856)
- Lycosphingia hamatus (Dewitz, 1879)
- Nephele discifera Karsch, 1891
- Phylloxiphia bicolor (Rothschild, 1894)
- Phylloxiphia formosa (Schultze, 1914)
- Phylloxiphia goodii (Holland, 1889)
- Phylloxiphia vicina (Rothschild & Jordan, 1915)
- Platysphinx constrigilis (Walker, 1869)
- Polyptychoides digitatus (Karsch, 1891)
- Polyptychus carteri (Butler, 1882)
- Polyptychus lapidatus Joicey & Kaye, 1917
- Polyptychus murinus Rothschild, 1904
- Polyptychus paupercula (Holland, 1889)
- Polyptychus trisecta (Aurivillius, 1901)
- Pseudoclanis admatha Pierre, 1985
- Theretra jugurtha (Boisduval, 1875)

== Tineidae ==
- Tinea subalbidella Stainton, 1867

== Zygaenidae ==
- Tascia instructa (Walker, 1854)

== See also ==
- List of butterflies of Liberia

General:

- Wildlife of Liberia
