= P. vicina =

P. vicina may refer to:

- Paa vicina, a frog species
- Perenniporia vicina, a fungus species in the genus Perenniporia
- Philoponella vicina, an uloborid spider species
- Phylloxiphia vicina, a moth species in the genus Phylloxiphia
- Poria vicina, a plant pathogen species
- Pterotricha vicina, a ground spider species in the genus Pterotricha

== See also ==
- Vicina (disambiguation)
