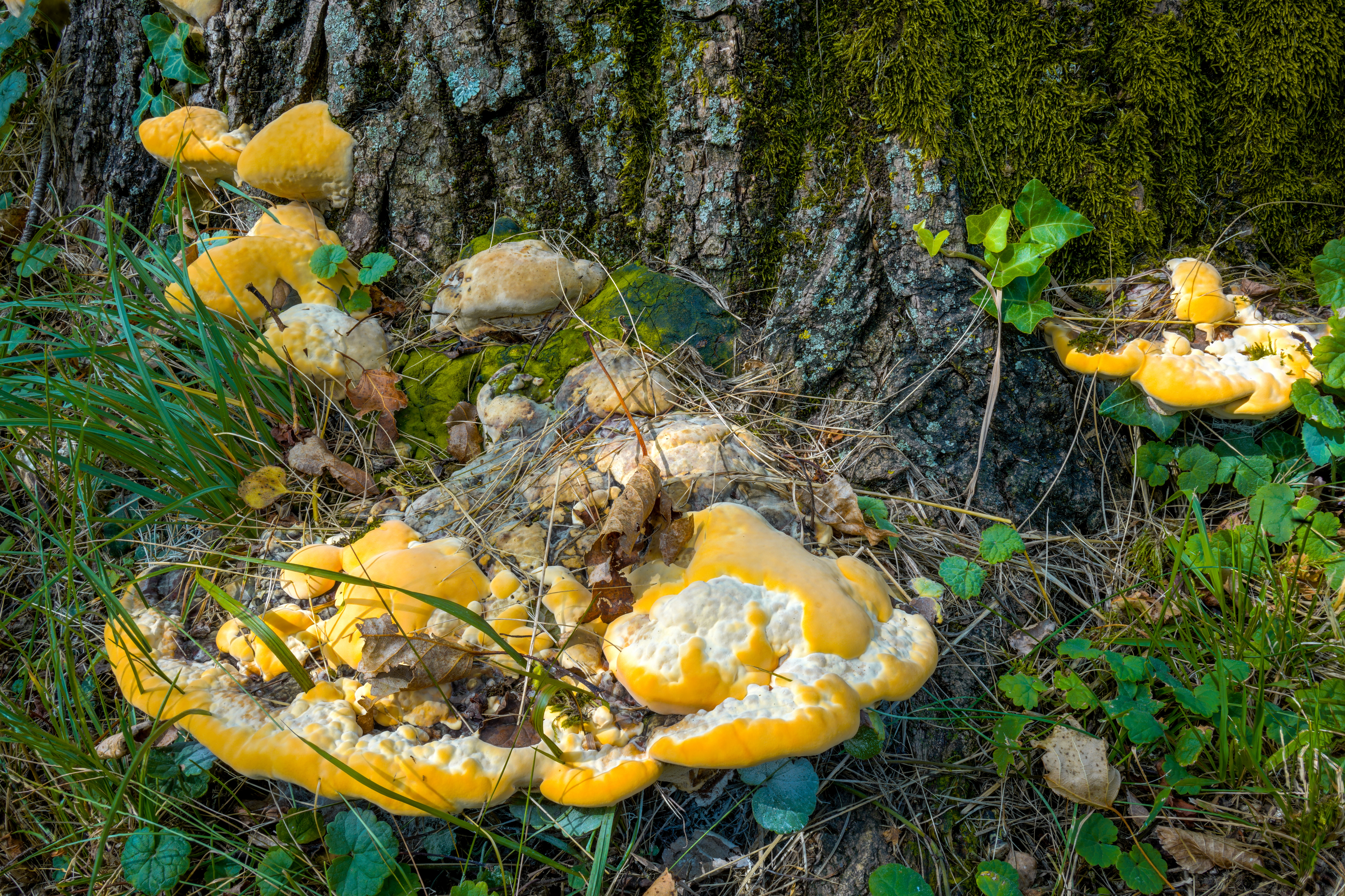
- Vanderbylia fraxinea at the base of a Populus tree

Scientific classification
- Domain: Eukaryota
- Kingdom: Fungi
- Division: Basidiomycota
- Class: Agaricomycetes
- Order: Polyporales
- Family: Polyporaceae
- Genus: Vanderbylia; D.A.Reid (1973)

Type species
- Vanderbylia vicina (Lloyd) D.A.Reid (1973)

= Vanderbylia =

Genus of fungi

Vanderbylia is a genus of fungi in the family Polyporaceae. It was circumscribed by British mycologist Derek Reid in 1973.

== Species ==
The following species are recognised in the genus Vanderbylia:

- Vanderbylia borneensis Corner (1987)
- Vanderbylia cinnamomea C.L. Zhao (2020)
- Vanderbylia delavayi (Pat.) B.K. Cui & Y.C. Dai (2019)
- Vanderbylia fraxinea (Bull.) D.A. Reid (1973)
- Vanderbylia kashmiriana U. Irfan, Khalid & Ab. Aziz (2023)
- Vanderbylia nigroapplanata (Van der Byl) D.A.Reid (1975)
- Vanderbylia peninsularis Corner (1987)
- Vanderbylia robiniophila (Murrill) B.K. Cui & Y.C. Dai (2019)
- Vanderbylia subincarnata Corner (1987)
- Vanderbylia ungulata D.A.Reid (1973)
- Vanderbylia vicina (Lloyd) D.A.Reid (1973)
