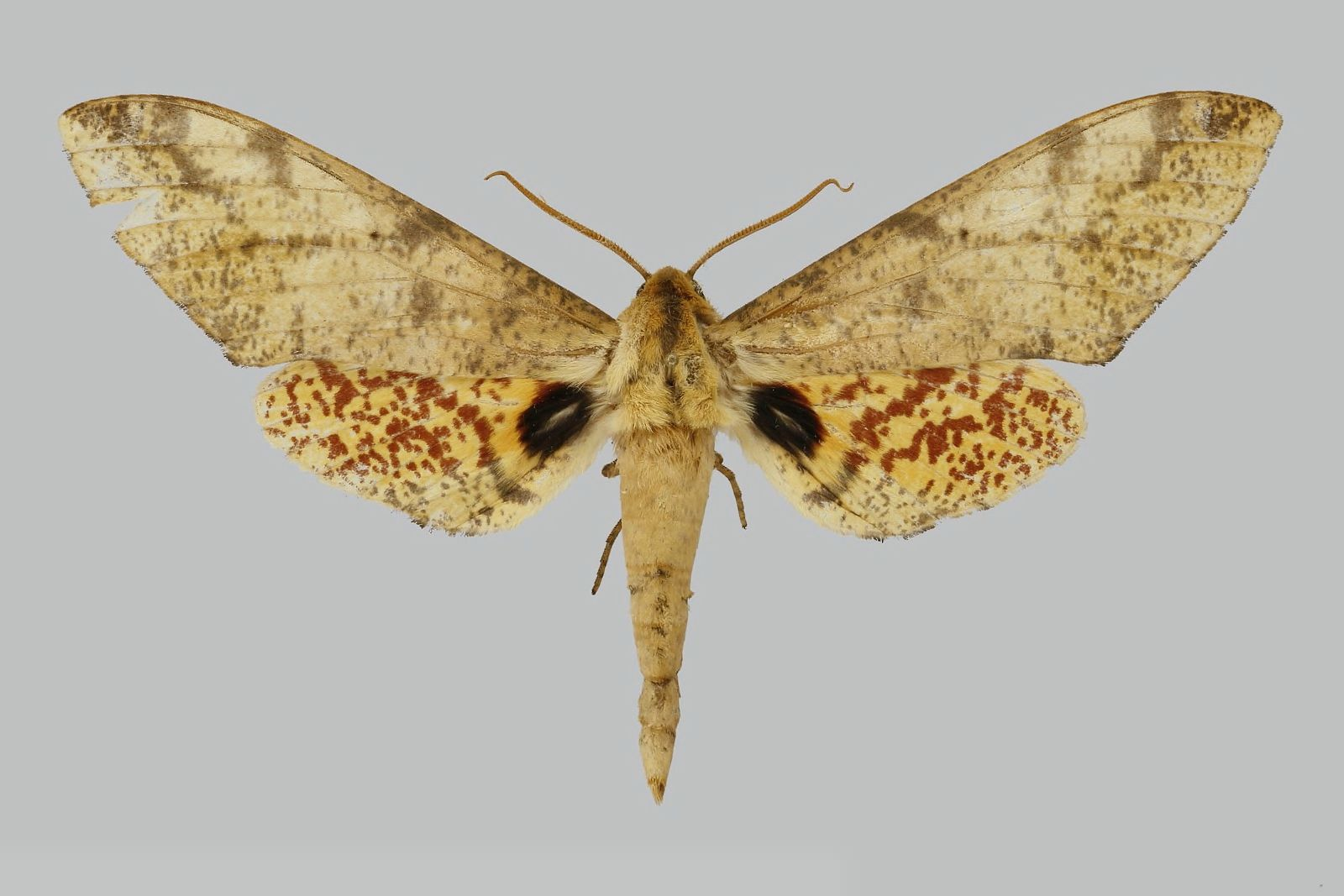
- Male

Scientific classification
- Domain: Eukaryota
- Kingdom: Animalia
- Phylum: Arthropoda
- Class: Insecta
- Order: Lepidoptera
- Family: Sphingidae
- Genus: Platysphinx
- Species: P. zabolicus

Binomial name
- Platysphinx zabolicus Haxaire & Melichar, 2007

= Platysphinx zabolicus =

Species of moth

Platysphinx zabolicus is a moth of the family Sphingidae. It is endemic to South Africa and known from Eastern Cape and KwaZulu-Natal.

The length of the forewings is 46 mm for males. The top of the body and front wings are pale yellow, while the forewing has a discreet greyish beige pattern. The top of the hindwing is speckled yellow with red spots. It is only convincingly separable from Platysphinx piabilis by examining the genitalia.

A new species of Platysphinx is described from the Republic of South Africa, Eastern Cape Province.
