= Sidamo =

Sidamo may refer to:

- Sidamo Province, a province of Ethiopia until 1995, now part of the Somali, Southern Peoples, and Oromia Regions
- Galla-Sidamo Governorate, part of Italian East Africa from 1936 to 1941
- Ethiopian Sidamo, a type of Arabica coffee grown in the area of the former Sidamo Province
- Sidamo language, an Afro-Asiatic language spoken in parts of southern Ethiopia
- Charaxes sidamo, a butterfly of family Nymphalidae
- Macrocossus sidamo, a moth of family Cossidae

== See also ==
- Sidama people, an ethnic group whose homeland is in the Sidama Zone of the SNNPR of Ethiopia
- Sidama Zone, Southern Nations, Nationalities, and Peoples' Region, Ethiopia
- Sidama Coffee, a football club based in Hawassa, Ethiopia
