= Englerodendron vignei =

Conservation status
- Least Concern (IUCN 3.1)

Scientific classification
- Kingdom: Plantae
- Clade: Tracheophytes
- Clade: Angiosperms
- Clade: Eudicots
- Clade: Rosids
- Order: Fabales
- Family: Fabaceae
- Genus: Englerodendron
- Species: E. vignei

Binomial name
- Englerodendron vignei (Hoyle) Estrella & Ojeda, 2019

Synonyms
- Anthonotha vignei (Hoyle) J.Léonard, 1955; Isomacrolobium vignei (Hoyle) Aubrév. & Pellegr., 1958; Macrolobium vignei Hoyle, 1933

Species of legume

Englerodendron vignei is a species of tree in the family Fabaceae endemic to tropical West Africa. It is found in Ghana, Côte d'Ivoire, Liberia, and Sierra Leone. It is threatened by habitat loss.
