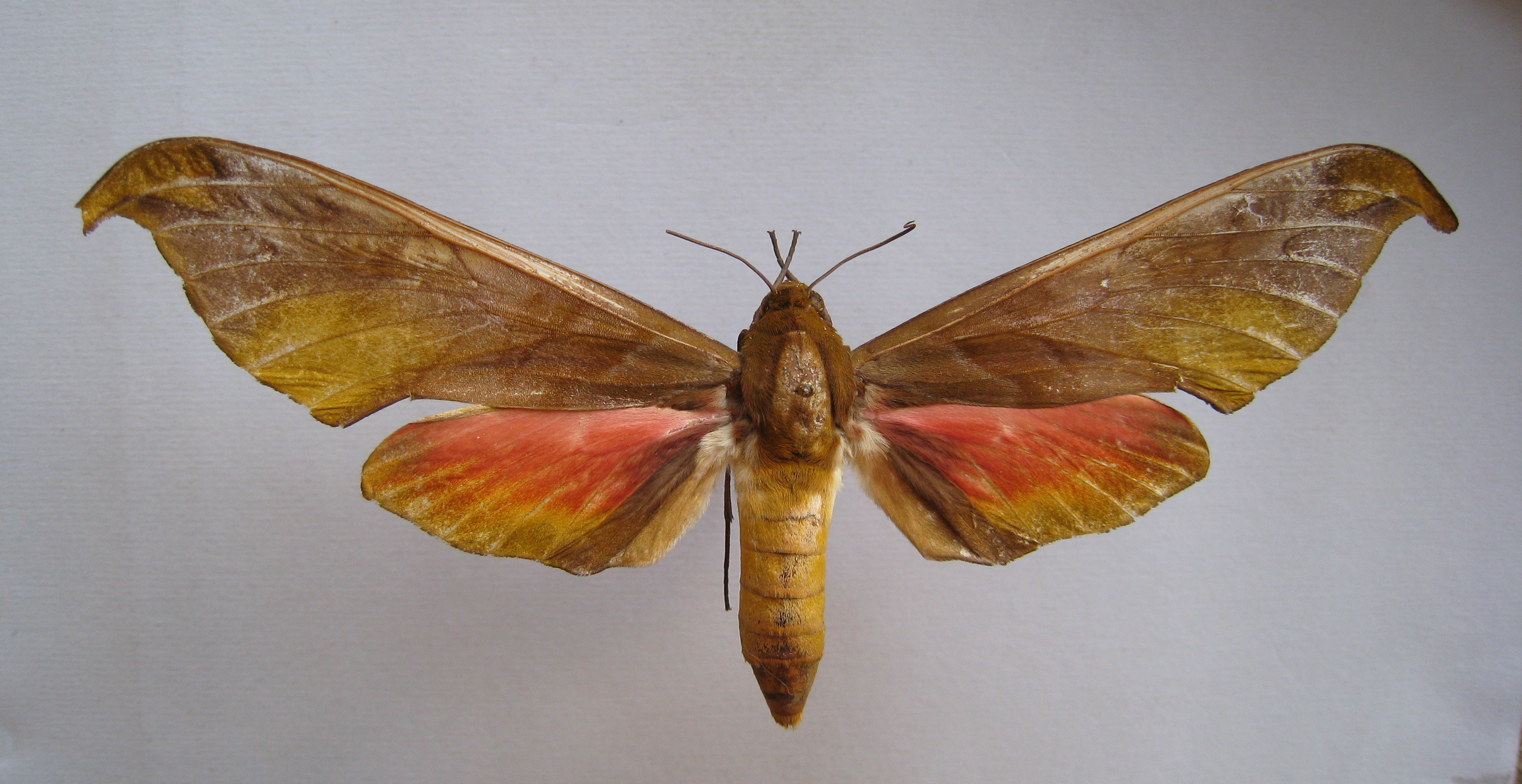

Scientific classification
- Kingdom: Animalia
- Phylum: Arthropoda
- Class: Insecta
- Order: Lepidoptera
- Family: Sphingidae
- Genus: Phylloxiphia
- Species: P. karschi

Binomial name
- Phylloxiphia karschi (Rothschild & Jordan, 1903)

Synonyms
- Pseudoclanis karschi Rothschild & Jordan, 1903; Libyoclanis karschi

= Phylloxiphia karschi =

Species of moth

Phylloxiphia karschi is a moth of the family Sphingidae. It is known from Cameroon, Gabon, Democratic Republic of the Congo and Uganda.
