= Neuroxena sulphureovitta =

Scientific classification
- Domain: Eukaryota
- Kingdom: Animalia
- Phylum: Arthropoda
- Class: Insecta
- Order: Lepidoptera
- Superfamily: Noctuoidea
- Family: Erebidae
- Subfamily: Arctiinae
- Genus: Neuroxena
- Species: N. sulphureovitta

Binomial name
- Neuroxena sulphureovitta (Strand, 1909)

Synonyms
- Eohemera sulphureovitta Strand, 1909

Species of moth

Neuroxena sulphureovitta is a moth of the subfamily Arctiinae. It is found in Ghana.
