= Neuroxena rubriceps =

Scientific classification
- Domain: Eukaryota
- Kingdom: Animalia
- Phylum: Arthropoda
- Class: Insecta
- Order: Lepidoptera
- Superfamily: Noctuoidea
- Family: Erebidae
- Subfamily: Arctiinae
- Genus: Neuroxena
- Species: N. rubriceps

Binomial name
- Neuroxena rubriceps (Mabille, 1879)

Synonyms
- Chelonia rubriceps Mabille, 1879; Eohemera biplagiata Gaede, 1926

Species of moth

Neuroxena rubriceps is a moth of the subfamily Arctiinae. It is found in Madagascar.
