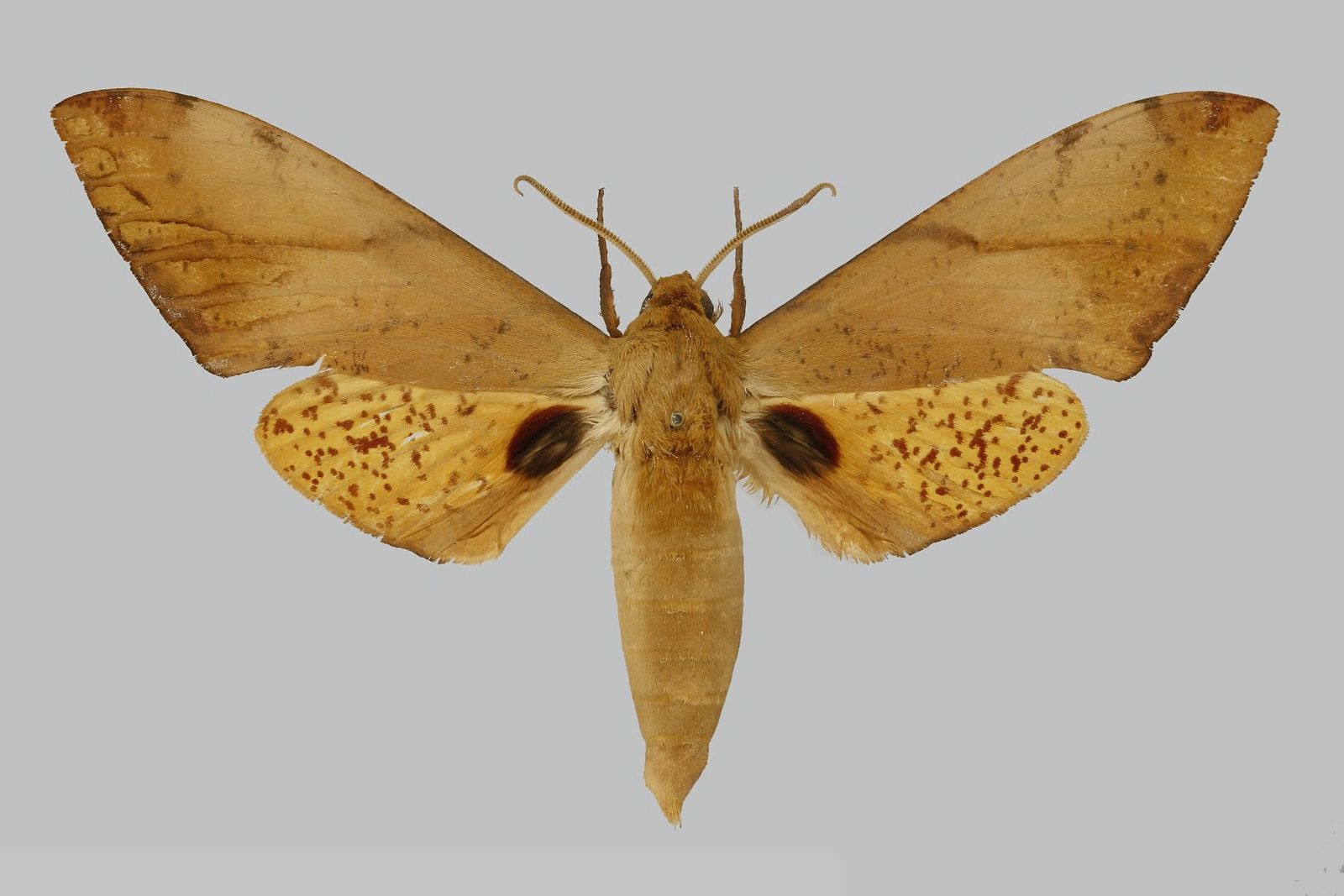

Scientific classification
- Domain: Eukaryota
- Kingdom: Animalia
- Phylum: Arthropoda
- Class: Insecta
- Order: Lepidoptera
- Family: Sphingidae
- Genus: Platysphinx
- Species: P. bouyeri

Binomial name
- Platysphinx bouyeri Haxaire & Bompar, 2003

= Platysphinx bouyeri =

Species of moth

Platysphinx bouyeri is a moth of the family Sphingidae. It is known from Burkina Faso and the Central African Republic.
