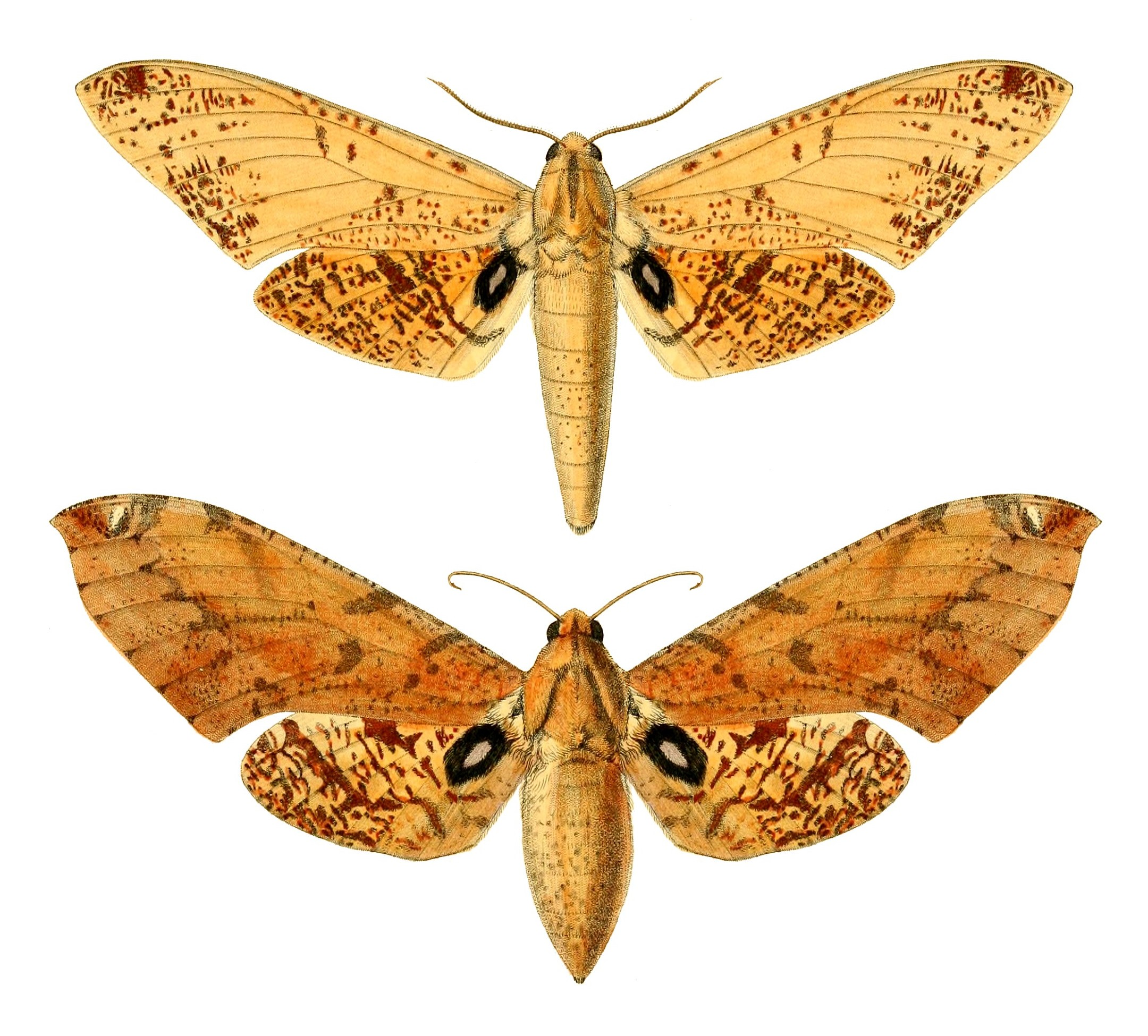
- Platysphinx stigmatica

Scientific classification
- Domain: Eukaryota
- Kingdom: Animalia
- Phylum: Arthropoda
- Class: Insecta
- Order: Lepidoptera
- Family: Sphingidae
- Tribe: Smerinthini
- Genus: Platysphinx; Rothschild & Jordan, 1903

= Platysphinx =

Genus of moths

Platysphinx is a genus of moths in the family Sphingidae first described by Walter Rothschild and Karl Jordan in 1903.

== Species ==
- Platysphinx bouyeri Haxaire & Bompar 2004
- Platysphinx constrigilis (Walker 1869)
- Platysphinx dorsti Rougeot 1977
- Platysphinx phyllis Rothschild & Jordan 1903
- Platysphinx piabilis (Distant 1897)
- Platysphinx stigmatica (Mabille 1878)
- Platysphinx vicaria Jordan 1920
- Platysphinx zabolichus Haxaire & Melichar 2007
