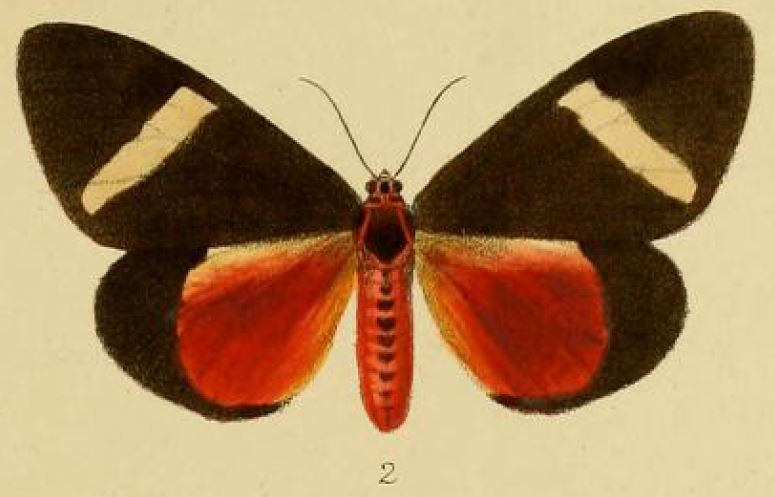
- Neuroxena flammea

Scientific classification
- Domain: Eukaryota
- Kingdom: Animalia
- Phylum: Arthropoda
- Class: Insecta
- Order: Lepidoptera
- Superfamily: Noctuoidea
- Family: Erebidae
- Subfamily: Arctiinae
- Subtribe: Nyctemerina
- Genus: Neuroxena; Kirby, 1896

Synonyms
- Parachelonia Aurivillius, 1900; Eohemera Aurivillius, 1904

= Neuroxena =

Genus of moths

Neuroxena is a genus of tiger moths in the family Erebidae. The genus was described by William Forsell Kirby in 1896.

== Species ==
The genus consists of the following species:

- Neuroxena aberrans
- Neuroxena albofasciata
- Neuroxena ansorgei
- Neuroxena auremaculatus
- Neuroxena flammea
- Neuroxena fulleri
- Neuroxena funereus
- Neuroxena lasti
- Neuroxena medioflavus
- Neuroxena obscurascens
- Neuroxena postrubidus
- Neuroxena rectilineata
- Neuroxena rubriceps
- Neuroxena simulans
- Neuroxena sulphureovitta
- Neuroxena truncatus
