= Neuroxena ansorgei =

Scientific classification
- Domain: Eukaryota
- Kingdom: Animalia
- Phylum: Arthropoda
- Class: Insecta
- Order: Lepidoptera
- Superfamily: Noctuoidea
- Family: Erebidae
- Subfamily: Arctiinae
- Genus: Neuroxena
- Species: N. ansorgei

Binomial name
- Neuroxena ansorgei Kirby, 1896

Species of moth

Neuroxena ansorgei is a moth of the subfamily Arctiinae. It is found in Democratic Republic of Congo, Kenya, Tanzania and Uganda.
