= Vanderbylia vicina =

Scientific classification
- Kingdom: Fungi
- Division: Basidiomycota
- Class: Agaricomycetes
- Order: Polyporales
- Family: Polyporaceae
- Genus: Vanderbylia
- Species: V. vicina

Binomial name
- Vanderbylia vicina (Lloyd) D.A.Reid (1973)

Synonyms
- Polyporus vicinus Lloyd (1924); Perenniporia vicina (Lloyd) Decock & Ryvarden (1999); Polyporus nigroapplanatus Van der Byl (1924)

Species of fungus

Vanderbylia vicina is a species of poroid fungus in the family Polyporaceae, and the type species of the genus Vanderbylia.

== Taxonomy ==
The fungus was originally described by Curtis Gates Lloyd in 1924 as Polyporus vicinus. Specimens were sent to Lloyd by Paul Andries van der Bijl from collections made in South Africa. Derek Reid transferred the species to the new genus Vanderbylia in 1973, in which it is the type species. Cony Decock and Leif Ryvarden proposed a transfer to Perenniporia in 1993.

== Description ==
Vanderbylia vicina has a shelf-like, semicircular fruit body that measures up to 75 mm (3 in) long, 150 mm (6 in) wide, and 25 mm (1 in) thick at the base. It has a dimitic hyphal system, with tree-like ("arboriform") skeletal hyphae in the tube tissue. The spores are more or less spherical to obovoid in shape, with dimensions averaging 8.2 by 6.6 μm. They have a dextrinoid reaction with Melzer's reagent, and have a small germ pore opposite the apiculus.

== Distribution ==
Vanderbylia vicina is found in east and southern Africa. Collections have been made in South Africa, Zimbabwe, and Ethiopia.
