= Macrocossus grebennikovi =

Scientific classification
- Kingdom: Animalia
- Phylum: Arthropoda
- Clade: Pancrustacea
- Class: Insecta
- Order: Lepidoptera
- Family: Cossidae
- Genus: Macrocossus
- Species: M. grebennikovi

Binomial name
- Macrocossus grebennikovi Yakovlev, 2013

Species of moth

Macrocossus grebennikovi is a moth in the family Cossidae. It is found in Malawi.
