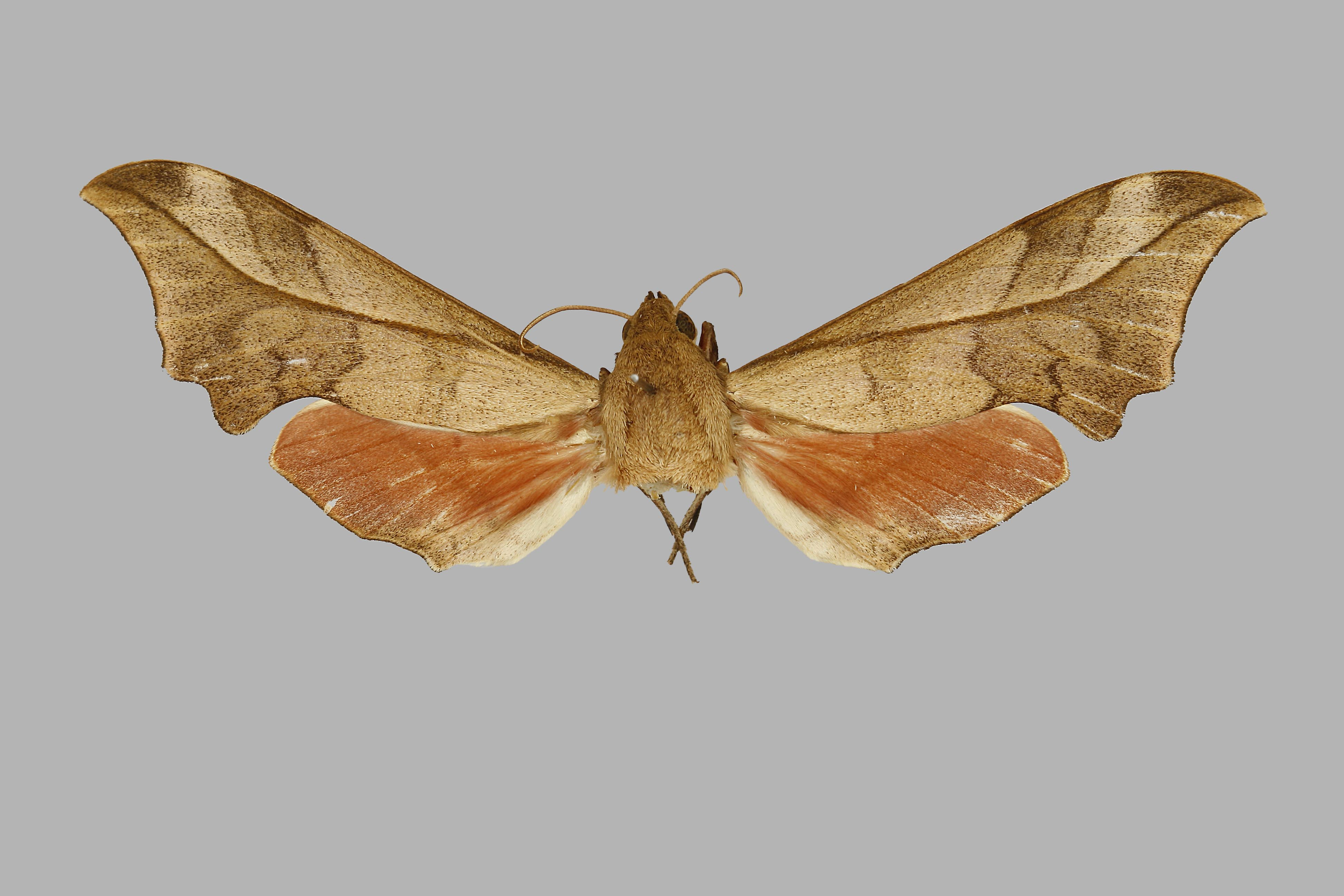

Scientific classification
- Kingdom: Animalia
- Phylum: Arthropoda
- Class: Insecta
- Order: Lepidoptera
- Family: Sphingidae
- Genus: Phylloxiphia
- Species: P. illustris

Binomial name
- Phylloxiphia illustris (Rothschild & Jordan, 1906)

Synonyms
- Typhosia illustris Rothschild & Jordan, 1906; Libyoclanis illustris

= Phylloxiphia illustris =

Species of moth

Phylloxiphia illustris is a moth of the family Sphingidae. It is known from lowland forest from Liberia to the Congo and western Uganda.

The length of the forewings is 27–29 mm.
