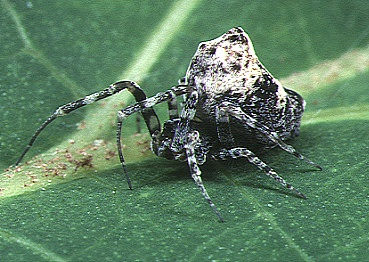
- female P. prominens from Okinawa
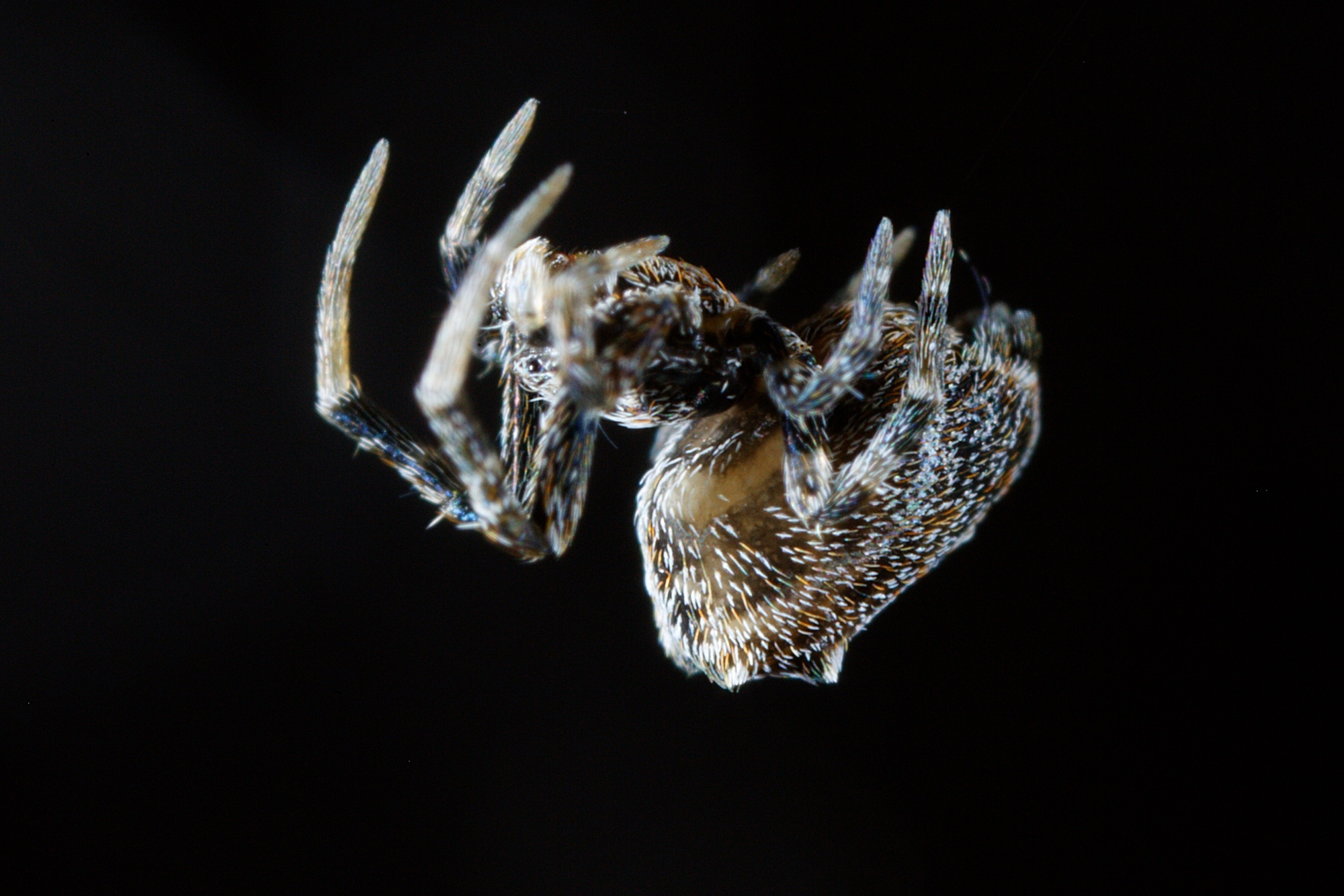
- P. congregabilis

Scientific classification
- Kingdom: Animalia
- Phylum: Arthropoda
- Subphylum: Chelicerata
- Class: Arachnida
- Order: Araneae
- Infraorder: Araneomorphae
- Family: Uloboridae
- Genus: Philoponella; Mello-Leitão, 1917

Species
- See text

Diversity
- 43 species

= Philoponella =

Genus of spiders

Philoponella is a genus of uloborid spiders. Like all Uloboridae, these species have no venom.

== Distribution ==
Philoponella species occur pantropical in the Americas, Africa, southeastern Asia and Australia, with almost half of them found from the southern United States to northern Argentina.

== Life style ==
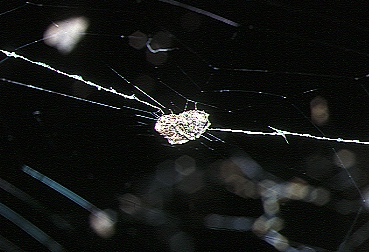
P. prominens stabilimentum

Philoponella species are web dwellers. Philoponella vicina uses its silk to compress and crush its prey.

== Cooperation ==
Some species (among them P. congregabilis and P. oweni) construct communal webs, but nevertheless do not capture prey cooperatively. However, a few species, such as P. raffrayi, are known to cooperate in prey capture. A colony of P. raffrayi is composed of individual orb-webs connected by non-adhesive silk. Its average body length is about 6 mm in females and 3 mm in males. Adult females are orange for at least a week after the final molt, and become black a few weeks later.

In these colonies, Argyrodes and Portia species can also be found, acting as kleptoparasites and predators, respectively. When relatively large prey is trapped on the periphery of the colony, two females cooperate in about 10% of cases in wrapping it, which increases their chances of success about fourfold. However, only one female then feeds on this prey. Cooperative capture is similar in P. republicana, where more than two individuals may work together.

== Description ==
The carapace is longer than wide and pale with broad dusky side stripes. The eyes are small and the posterior row is almost straight. The integument is clothed with white setae.

The abdomen has distinct front anterior tubercles, less distinct posterior tubercles, and the apex of the abdomen is nearly in the middle of its length. Specimens are quite white with faint, dusky spots on abdominal tubercles.

== Species ==
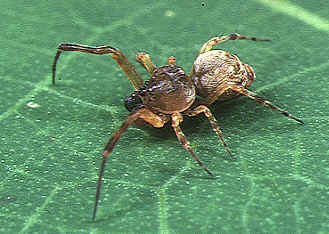
male P. prominens

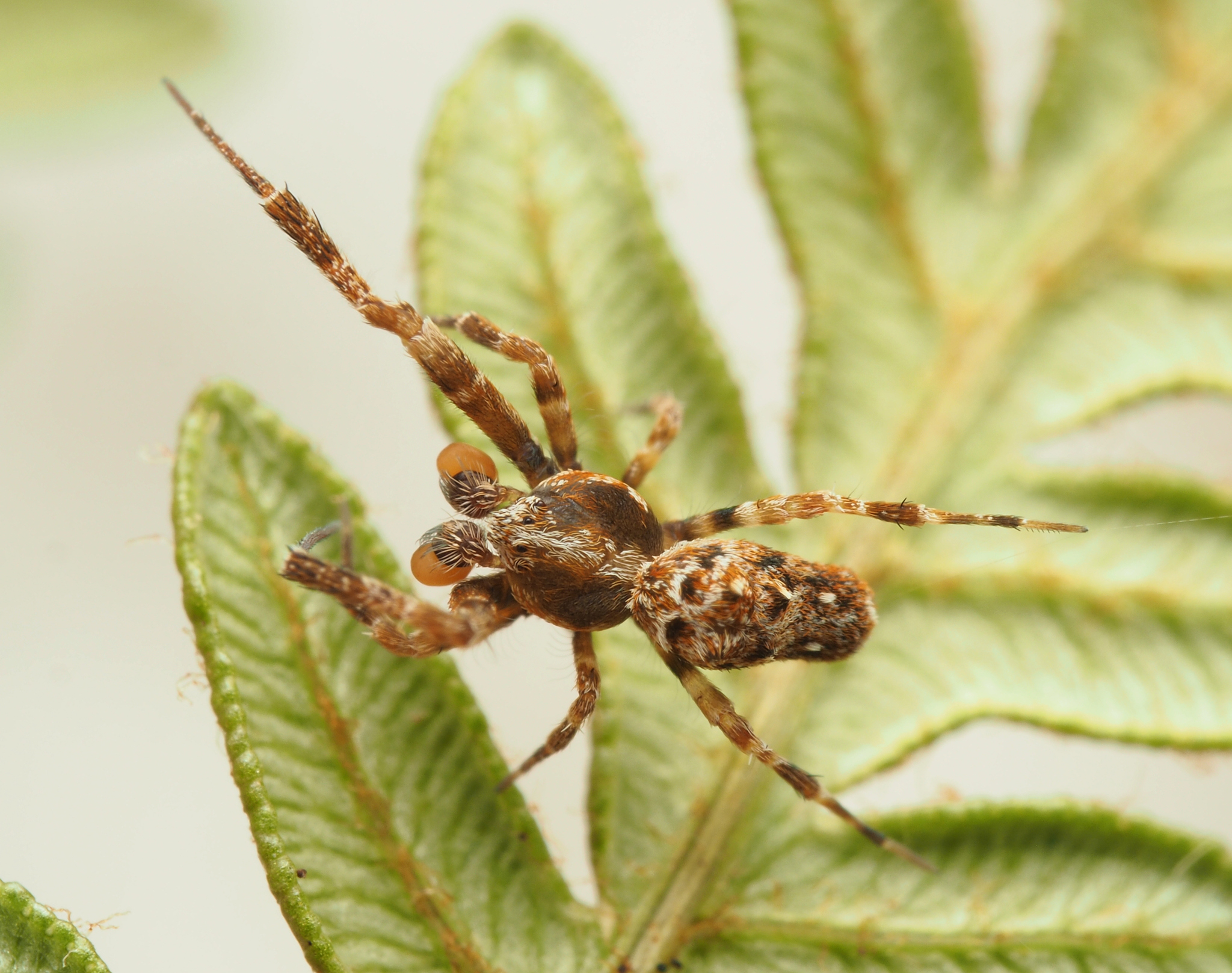
P. variabilis

As of October 2025, this genus includes 43 species:

- Philoponella alata Lin & Li, 2008 – China
- Philoponella angolensis (Lessert, 1933) – Ivory Coast, Angola, South Africa
- Philoponella arizonica (Gertsch, 1936) – United States, Mexico
- Philoponella bella Opell, 1979 – Colombia
- Philoponella collina (Keyserling, 1883) – Peru
- Philoponella congregabilis (Rainbow, 1916) – Australia. Introduced to New Zealand
- Philoponella cymbiformis Xie, Peng, Zhang, Gong & Kim, 1997 – China
- Philoponella divisa Opell, 1979 – Colombia, Brazil
- Philoponella duopunctata Faleiro & Santos, 2014 – Brazil
- Philoponella fasciata (Mello-Leitão, 1917) – Brazil, Paraguay, Argentina
- Philoponella feroka (Bradoo, 1979) – India
- Philoponella fluviidulcifis Faleiro & Santos, 2014 – Brazil
- Philoponella gibberosa (Kulczyński, 1908) – Indonesia (Java)
- Philoponella herediae Opell, 1987 – Costa Rica
- Philoponella hilaris (Simon, 1906) – India
- Philoponella lingulata Dong, Zhu & Yoshida, 2005 – China
- Philoponella lunaris (C. L. Koch, 1839) – Brazil
- Philoponella mollis (Thorell, 1895) – Myanmar
- Philoponella nasuta (Thorell, 1895) – China, Myanmar
- Philoponella nigromaculata Yoshida, 1992 – Taiwan
- Philoponella opelli Faleiro & Santos, 2014 – Ecuador, Brazil
- Philoponella operosa (Simon, 1897) – South Africa
- Philoponella oweni (Chamberlin, 1924) – United States, Mexico
- Philoponella pantherina (Keyserling, 1890) – Australia (New South Wales)
- Philoponella para Opell, 1979 – Paraguay, Argentina
- Philoponella pisiformis Dong, Zhu & Yoshida, 2005 – China
- Philoponella pomelita Grismado, 2004 – Argentina
- Philoponella prominens (Bösenberg & Strand, 1906) – China, Korea, Taiwan, Japan
- Philoponella quadrituberculata (Thorell, 1893) – Singapore, Indonesia (Java, Moluccas)
- Philoponella raffrayi (Simon, 1891) – Singapore, Indonesia (Java, Moluccas)
- Philoponella ramirezi Grismado, 2004 – Brazil
- Philoponella republicana (Simon, 1891) – Panama to Bolivia (type species)
- Philoponella rostralis Shilpa & Sudhikumar, 2022 – India
- Philoponella sabah Yoshida, 1992 – Malaysia (Borneo)
- Philoponella semiplumosa (Simon, 1893) – United States, Greater Antilles to Venezuela
- Philoponella signatella (Roewer, 1951) – Mexico to Honduras
- Philoponella subvittata Opell, 1981 – Guyana
- Philoponella tingens (Chamberlin & Ivie, 1936) – Mexico to Colombia
- Philoponella truncata (Thorell, 1895) – Myanmar, Indonesia (Java)
- Philoponella variabilis (Keyserling, 1887) – Australia (Queensland, New South Wales)
- Philoponella vicina (O. Pickard-Cambridge, 1899) – Mexico to Costa Rica
- Philoponella vittata (Keyserling, 1881) – Panama to Paraguay
- Philoponella wuyiensis Xie, Peng, Zhang, Gong & Kim, 1997 – China
