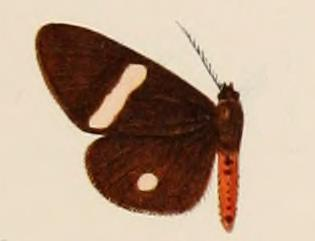

Scientific classification
- Domain: Eukaryota
- Kingdom: Animalia
- Phylum: Arthropoda
- Class: Insecta
- Order: Lepidoptera
- Superfamily: Noctuoidea
- Family: Erebidae
- Subfamily: Arctiinae
- Genus: Neuroxena
- Species: N. lasti

Binomial name
- Neuroxena lasti (Rothschild, 1910)

Synonyms
- Pericallia lasti Rothschild, 1910; Axiopaenella lasti

= Neuroxena lasti =

Species of moth

Neuroxena lasti is a moth of the subfamily Arctiinae. It is found on Madagascar.
