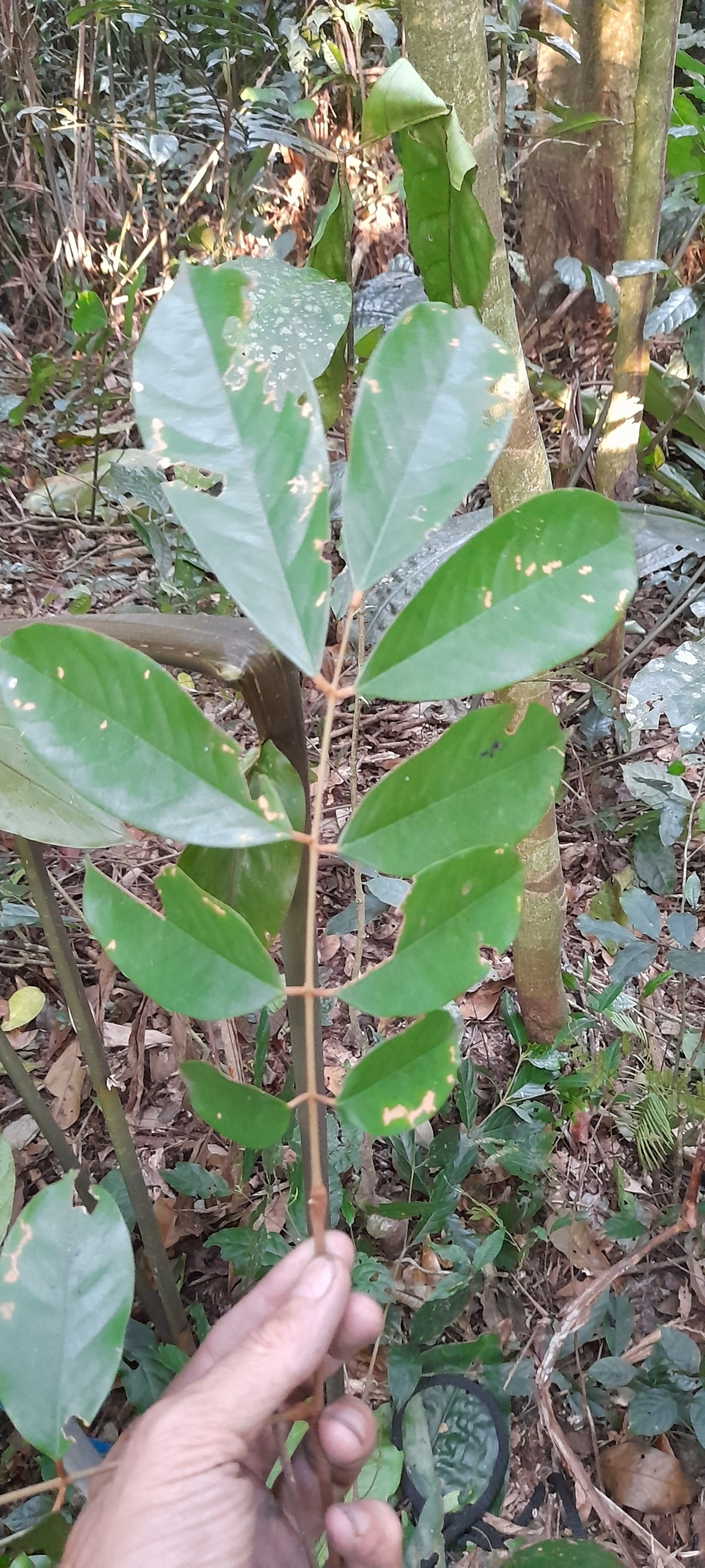
- Anthonotha pynaertii in Angola

Scientific classification
- Kingdom: Plantae
- Clade: Embryophytes
- Clade: Tracheophytes
- Clade: Spermatophytes
- Clade: Angiosperms
- Clade: Eudicots
- Clade: Rosids
- Order: Fabales
- Family: Fabaceae
- Subfamily: Detarioideae
- Tribe: Amherstieae
- Genus: Anthonotha; P.Beauv.

Type species
- Anthonotha macrophylla P.Beauv., 1806

Species
- 17; see text
- Anthonotha distribution map.

= Anthonotha =

Genus of legumes

Anthonotha is a genus within the subfamily Detarioideae of the plant family Fabaceae.

== Taxonomic history ==
The first species of the genus was described in 1806 by Palisot de Beauvois based on a specimen collected in West Africa and named Anthonotha macrophylla P.Beauv. The genus was not recognized and in 1865 Henri Baillon transferred it to the South American genus Vouapa, described by Jean Baptiste Aublet in 1775. Vouapa later became a junior synonym since the conserved name of Macrolobium was favored for the genus described by Johann Schreber in 1789.

Most species now recognized within Anthonotha were originally described within the genus Macrolobium. The species Anthonotha macrophylla continued under the illegitimate name Macrolobium palisotii described by Bentham in 1865. This was corrected by James Macbride in 1919 by publishing the correct name M. macrophyllum (P.Beauv.) Macbride.

In 1955 Léonard reinstalled Anthonotha for the rest of the African Macrolobium species, after several other species had been transferred to his newly described genera Gilbertiodendron, Paramacrolobium, and Pellegrineodendron. Léonard subclassified the reinstalled Anthonotha with 26 species into five sections. Anthonotha section Anthonotha became the genus Anthonotha in a new, narrow sense.

The species of the other four sections of Anthonotha were placed in the genera Isomacrolobium and Englerodendron by Breteler. Isomacrolobium was later synonymized with Englerodendron.

A prehistoric species, Anthonotha shimaglae, has been reported from the early Miocene of Ethiopia and is a component of an ancient forest dominated by Englerodendron.

== Species ==
Anthonotha contains the following species:

- Anthonotha acuminata (De Wild.) J.Léonard, 1957
- Anthonotha brieyi (De Wild.) J.Léonard, 1957
- Anthonotha cladantha (Harms) J.Léonard, 1955
- Anthonotha crassifolia (Baill.) J.Léonard, 1955
- Anthonotha ferruginea (Harms) J.Léonard, 1955
- Anthonotha fragrans (Baker f.) Exell & Hillc., 1955
- Anthonotha gilletii (De Wild.) J.Léonard, 1957
- Anthonotha lamprophylla (Harms) J.Léonard, 1955
- Anthonotha macrophylla P.Beauv., 1806
- Anthonotha mouandzae Breteler, 2010
- Anthonotha noldeae (Rossberg) Exell & Hillc., 1955
- Anthonotha pellegrinii Aubrév., 1968
- Anthonotha pynaertii (De Wild.) Exell & Hillc., 1955
- †Anthonotha shimaglae Pan, Jacobs, Currano, Estrella, Herendeen et Burgt, 2023 - extinct
- Anthonotha stipulacea (Benth.) J.Léonard, 1955
- Anthonotha trunciflora (Harms) J.Léonard, 1955
- Anthonotha wijmacampensis Breteler, 2010
- Anthonotha xanderi Breteler, 2010

== Phylogeny ==
The following relationships have been suggested for the genus Anthonotha:

- - Englerodendron (outgroup)
  - Anthonotha
    - - - Anthonotha noldeae
        - Anthonotha cladantha
      - - - Anthonotha pellegrinii
          - - Anthonotha wijmacampensis
            - Anthonotha brieyi
        - - Anthonotha xanderi
          - - Anthonotha trunciflora
            - - Anthonotha lamprophylla
              - - Anthonotha ferruginea
                - Anthonotha stipulacea
    - - Anthonotha mouandzae
      - - - Anthonotha gilletii
          - - Anthonotha pynaerfii
            - Anthonotha acuminata
        - - Anthonotha macrophylla
          - - Anthonotha crassifolia
            - Anthonotha fragrans
