= Phylloxiphia oweni =

Scientific classification
- Kingdom: Animalia
- Phylum: Arthropoda
- Class: Insecta
- Order: Lepidoptera
- Family: Sphingidae
- Genus: Phylloxiphia
- Species: P. oweni

Binomial name
- Phylloxiphia oweni (Carcasson, 1968)

Synonyms
- Libyoclanis oweni Carcasson, 1968

Species of moth

Phylloxiphia oweni is a moth of the family Sphingidae. It is found from Sierra Leone east to the Central African Republic and then south to Gabon, the Republic of the Congo and the Democratic Republic of the Congo.
