= Platysphinx dorsti =

Scientific classification
- Kingdom: Animalia
- Phylum: Arthropoda
- Class: Insecta
- Order: Lepidoptera
- Family: Sphingidae
- Genus: Platysphinx
- Species: P. dorsti

Binomial name
- Platysphinx dorsti Rougeot, 1977

Species of moth

Platysphinx dorsti is a moth of the family Sphingidae. It is known from Ethiopia.
