= Englerodendron obanense =

Conservation status
- Vulnerable (IUCN 2.3)

Scientific classification
- Kingdom: Plantae
- Clade: Tracheophytes
- Clade: Angiosperms
- Clade: Eudicots
- Clade: Rosids
- Order: Fabales
- Family: Fabaceae
- Genus: Englerodendron
- Species: E. obanense

Binomial name
- Englerodendron obanense (Baker f.) Estrella & Ojeda, 2019

Synonyms
- Anthonotha elongata (Hutch.) J.Léonard, 1955; Anthonotha ernae (Dinkl.) J.Léonard, 1955; Anthonotha obanensis (Baker f.) J.Léonard, 1955; Isomacrolobium elongatum (Hutch.) Aubrév. & Pellegr., 1958; Isomacrolobium obanense (Baker f.) Aubrév. & Pellegr., 1958; Macrolobium elongatum Hutch., 1916; Macrolobium ernae Dinkl., 1937; Macrolobium obanense Baker f., 1913; Triplisomeris ernae (Dinkl.) Aubrév. & Pellegr., 1958

Species of legume

Englerodendron obanense is a small tree in the family Fabaceae. It is endemic to Nigeria. It is threatened by habitat loss.
