= Philoponella angolensis =

Angola Hackled Orb-Web Spider

Scientific classification
- Kingdom: Animalia
- Phylum: Arthropoda
- Subphylum: Chelicerata
- Class: Arachnida
- Order: Araneae
- Infraorder: Araneomorphae
- Family: Uloboridae
- Genus: Philoponella
- Species: P. angolensis

Binomial name
- Philoponella angolensis (Lessert, 1933)

Synonyms
- Uloborus angolensis Lessert, 1933

Species of spider

Philoponella angolensis is a species of spider in the family Uloboridae. It is commonly known as the Angola hackled orb-web spider.

== Distribution ==
Philoponella angolensis is found in Ivory Coast, Angola, and South Africa.

In South Africa, the species has been recorded from the provinces Eastern Cape, KwaZulu-Natal, Limpopo, and Western Cape. Localities include Jeffrey's Bay, Addo Elephant National Park, King William's Town, Thornhill, Tembe Elephant Park, Ndumo Game Reserve, and Blouberg Nature Reserve.

== Habitat and ecology ==
Philoponella angolensis is an orb-web spider making webs with cribellate silk in vegetation. The species has been sampled from Fynbos, Savanna and Thicket biomes at altitudes ranging from 0 to 894 m.

== Conservation ==
Philoponella angolensis is listed as Least Concern by the South African National Biodiversity Institute due to its wide geographical range across three African countries. The species is protected in Addo Elephant National Park, Tembe Elephant Park, Ndumo Game Reserve and Blouberg Nature Reserve.

== Taxonomy ==
Philoponella angolensis was originally described by Roger de Lessert in 1933 from Angola. The species has not been revised and is known from both sexes.
