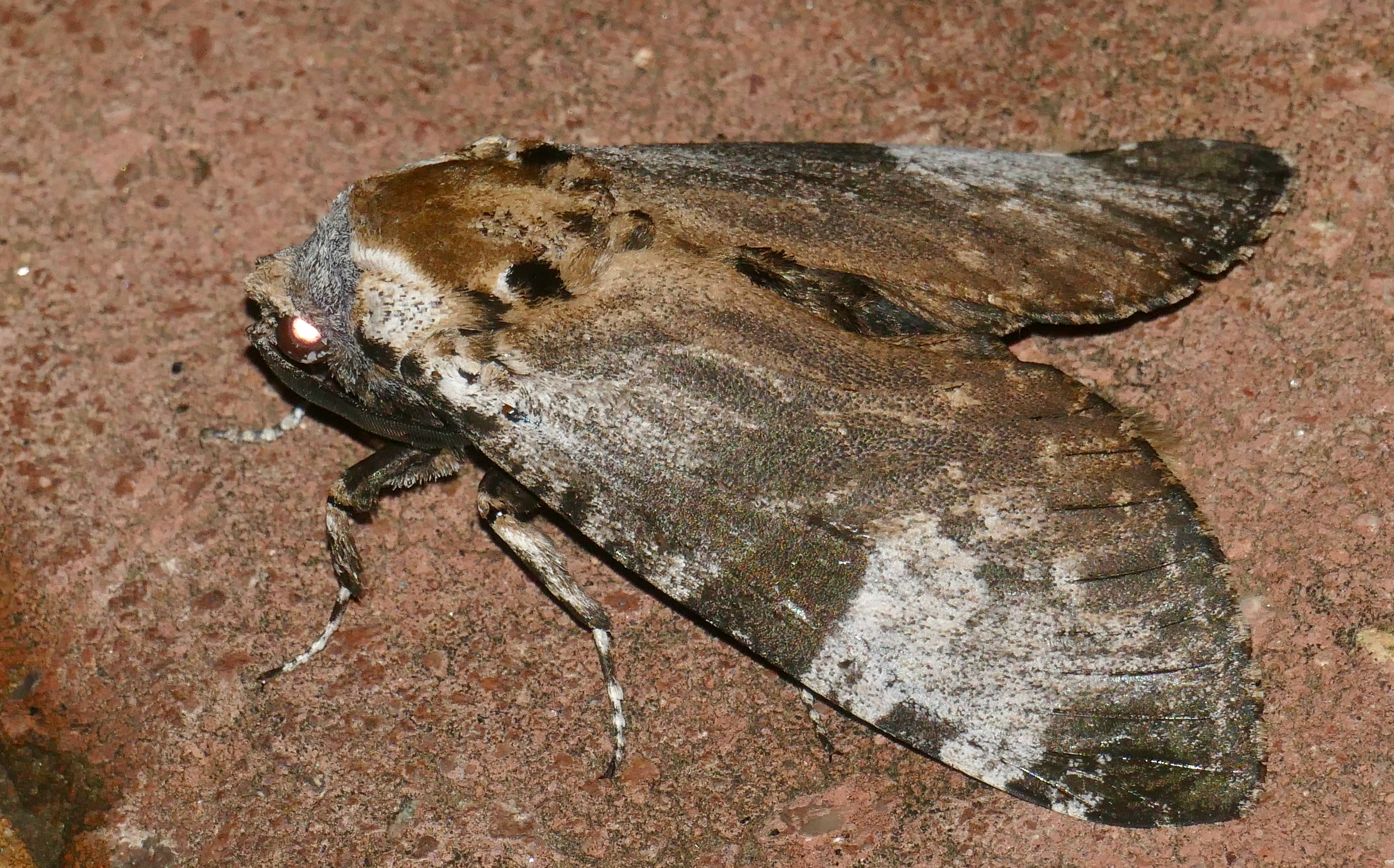

Scientific classification
- Kingdom: Animalia
- Phylum: Arthropoda
- Class: Insecta
- Order: Lepidoptera
- Family: Cossidae
- Genus: Macrocossus
- Species: M. toluminus

Binomial name
- Macrocossus toluminus (H. Druce, 1887)

Synonyms
- Cossus toluminus H. Druce, 1887; Macrocossus rudis Aurivillius, 1900

= Macrocossus toluminus =

Species of moth

Macrocossus toluminus is a moth in the family Cossidae first described by Herbert Druce in 1887. It is found in Cameroon, the Democratic Republic of the Congo, Ivory Coast, Malawi, Namibia, Sierra Leone, South Africa, Tanzania and the Gambia.
