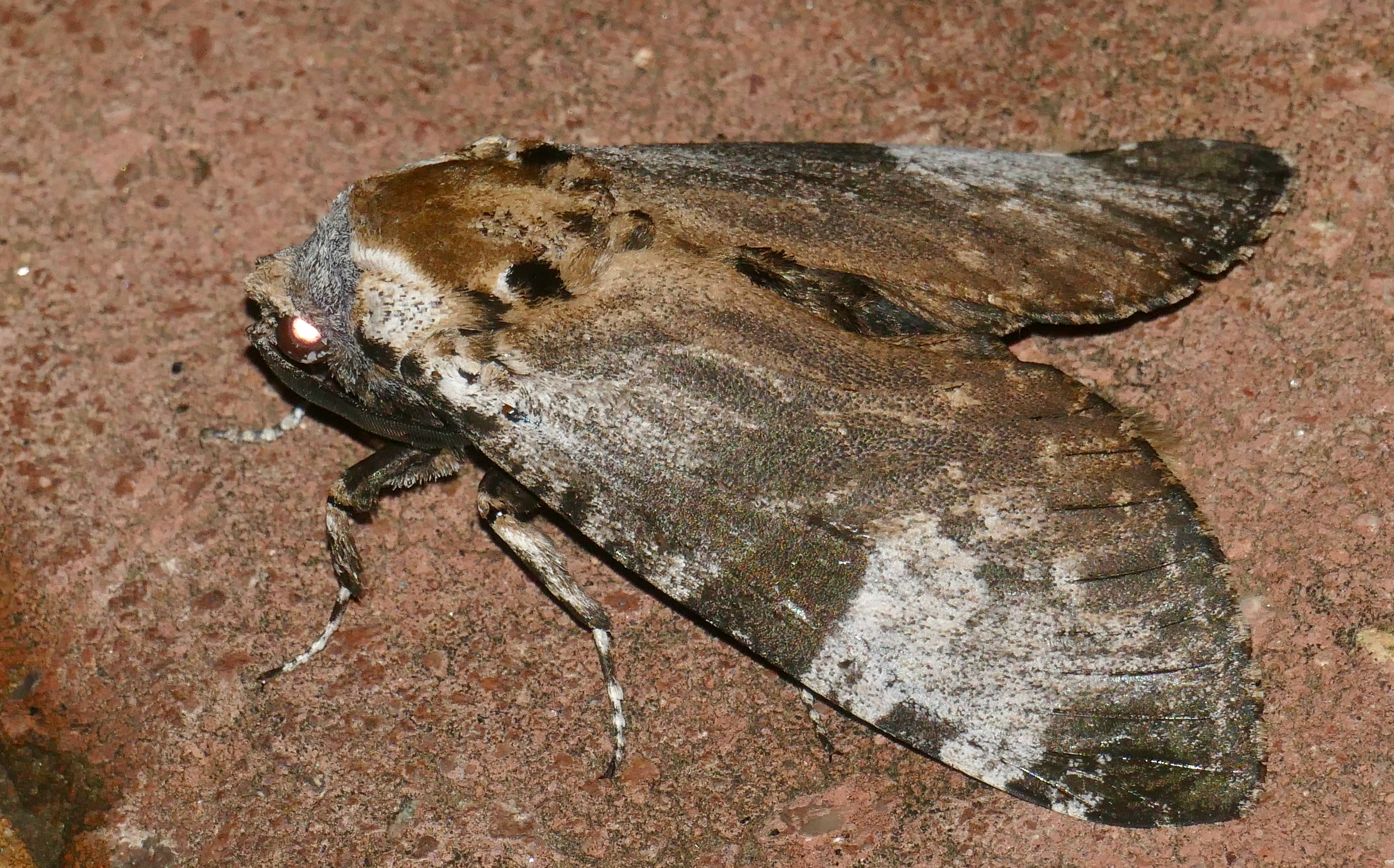
- M. toluminus

Scientific classification
- Kingdom: Animalia
- Phylum: Arthropoda
- Class: Insecta
- Order: Lepidoptera
- Family: Cossidae
- Subfamily: Cossinae
- Genus: Macrocossus; Aurivillius, 1900

= Macrocossus =

Genus of moths

Macrocossus is a genus of moths in the family Cossidae.

== Species ==
- Macrocossus caducus H.K. Clench, 1959
- Macrocossus coelebs H.K. Clench, 1959
- Macrocossus grebennikovi Yakovlev, 2013
- Macrocossus sidamo (Rougeot, 1977)
- Macrocossus toluminus (Druce, 1887)
