= Neuroxena auremaculatus =

Scientific classification
- Domain: Eukaryota
- Kingdom: Animalia
- Phylum: Arthropoda
- Class: Insecta
- Order: Lepidoptera
- Superfamily: Noctuoidea
- Family: Erebidae
- Subfamily: Arctiinae
- Genus: Neuroxena
- Species: N. auremaculatus

Binomial name
- Neuroxena auremaculatus (Rothschild, 1933)

Synonyms
- Creatonotos auremaculatus Rothschild, 1933

Species of moth

Neuroxena auremaculatus is a moth of the subfamily Arctiinae. It is found in Madagascar.
