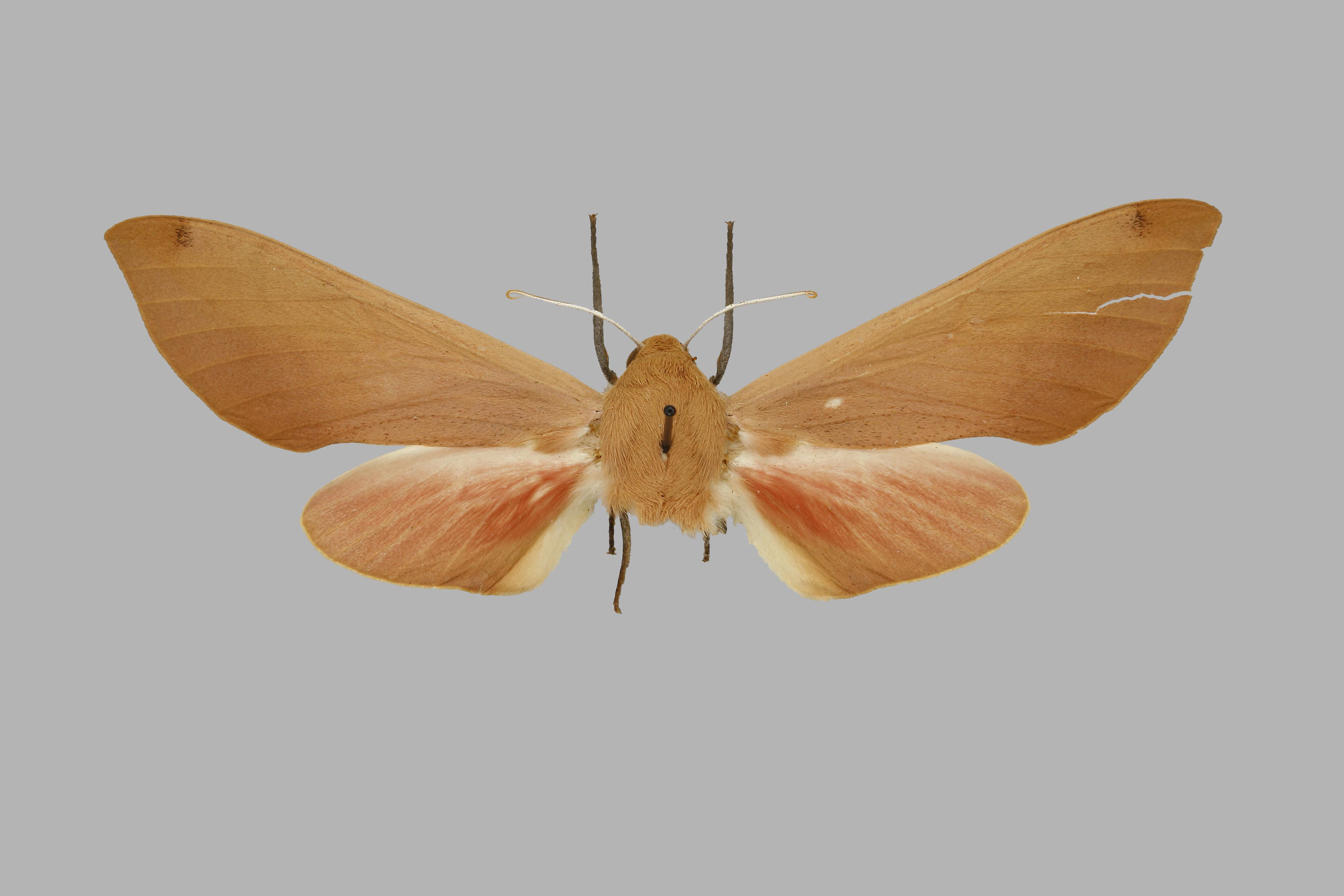

Scientific classification
- Kingdom: Animalia
- Phylum: Arthropoda
- Class: Insecta
- Order: Lepidoptera
- Family: Sphingidae
- Genus: Phylloxiphia
- Species: P. metria

Binomial name
- Phylloxiphia metria (Jordan, 1920)

Synonyms
- Libyoclanis metria Jordan, 1920; Libyoclanis noctivaga Kernbach, 1957

= Phylloxiphia metria =

Species of moth

Phylloxiphia metria is a moth of the family Sphingidae. It is known to be from Brachystegia woodland of Mozambique to Zambia and the Democratic Republic of the Congo, and north to Malawi and Tanzania.

The length of its forewings is about 37 mm for males and 45 mm for females.
