= Englerodendron nigericum =

Conservation status
- Vulnerable (IUCN 2.3)

Scientific classification
- Kingdom: Plantae
- Clade: Tracheophytes
- Clade: Angiosperms
- Clade: Eudicots
- Clade: Rosids
- Order: Fabales
- Family: Fabaceae
- Genus: Englerodendron
- Species: E. nigericum

Binomial name
- Englerodendron nigericum (Baker f.) Estrella & Ojeda, 2019

Synonyms
- Anthonotha nigerica (Baker f.) J.Léonard, 1955; Isomacrolobium nigericum (Baker f.) Aubrév. & Pellegr., 1958; Macrolobium leptorrhachis var. nigericum Baker f., 1913; Macrolobium nigericum (Baker f.) J.Léonard, 1952

Species of legume

Englerodendron nigericum is a species of tree in the family Fabaceae. It is found in Democratic Republic of the Congo and Nigeria. It is threatened by habitat loss.
