= Neuroxena postrubidus =

Scientific classification
- Kingdom: Animalia
- Phylum: Arthropoda
- Class: Insecta
- Order: Lepidoptera
- Superfamily: Noctuoidea
- Family: Erebidae
- Subfamily: Arctiinae
- Genus: Neuroxena
- Species: N. postrubidus

Binomial name
- Neuroxena postrubidus (Rothschild, 1933)

Species of moth

Neuroxena postrubidus is a moth of the subfamily Arctiinae. It is found in the Democratic Republic of Congo.
