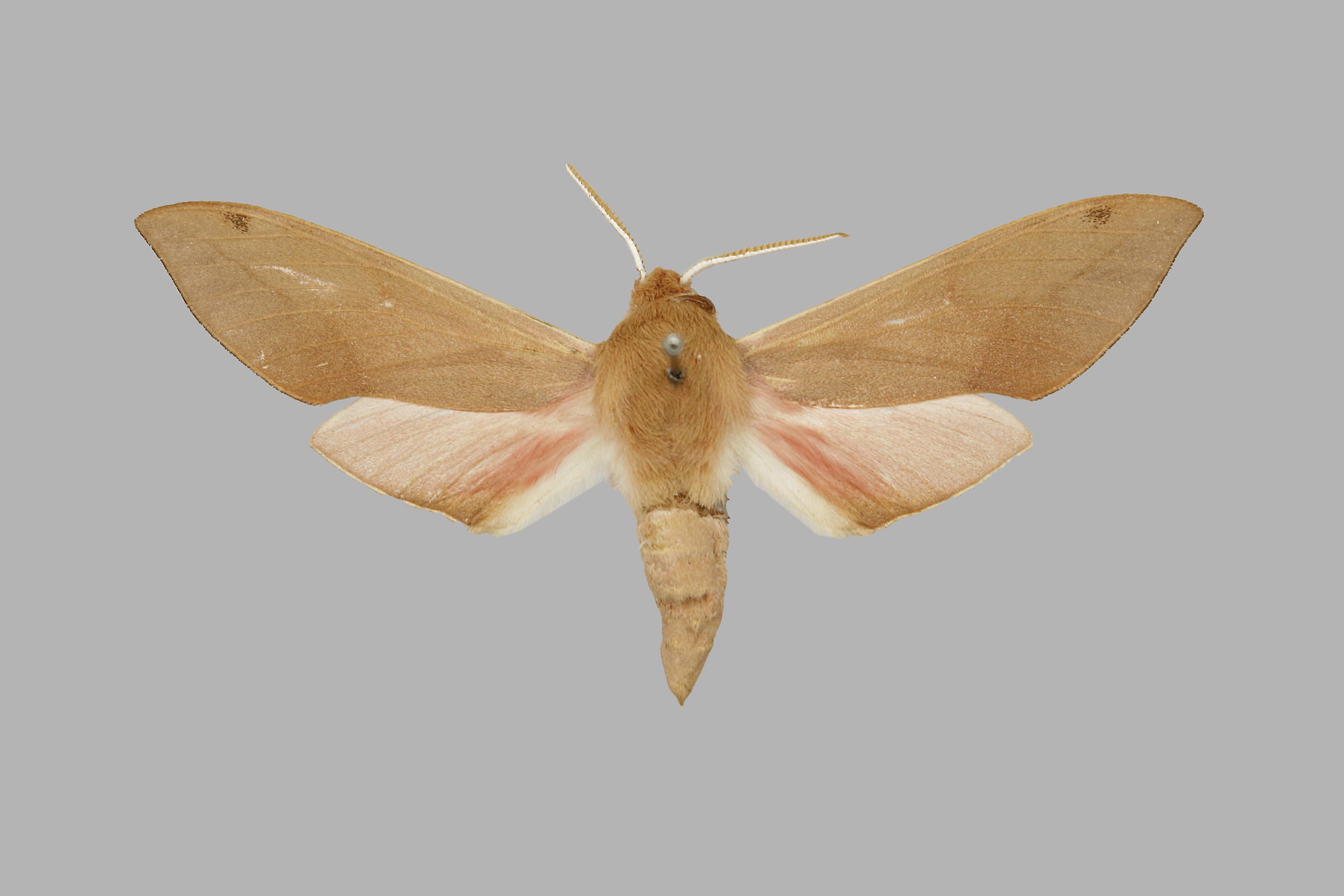

Scientific classification
- Domain: Eukaryota
- Kingdom: Animalia
- Phylum: Arthropoda
- Class: Insecta
- Order: Lepidoptera
- Family: Sphingidae
- Genus: Phylloxiphia
- Species: P. punctum

Binomial name
- Phylloxiphia punctum (Rothschild, 1907)

Synonyms
- Libyoclanis punctum Rothschild, 1907

= Phylloxiphia punctum =

Species of moth

Phylloxiphia punctum is a moth of the family Sphingidae. It is known from savanna from north-eastern South Africa to Zimbabwe, Zambia, the Democratic Republic of the Congo and Tanzania.

The length of the forewings is about 35 mm.
