= Englerodendron usambarense =

Conservation status
- Near Threatened (IUCN 3.1)

Scientific classification
- Kingdom: Plantae
- Clade: Tracheophytes
- Clade: Angiosperms
- Clade: Eudicots
- Clade: Rosids
- Order: Fabales
- Family: Fabaceae
- Genus: Englerodendron
- Species: E. usambarense

Binomial name
- Englerodendron usambarense Harms

Species of legume

Englerodendron usambarense is a species of plant in the family Fabaceae. It is found only in Tanzania.
