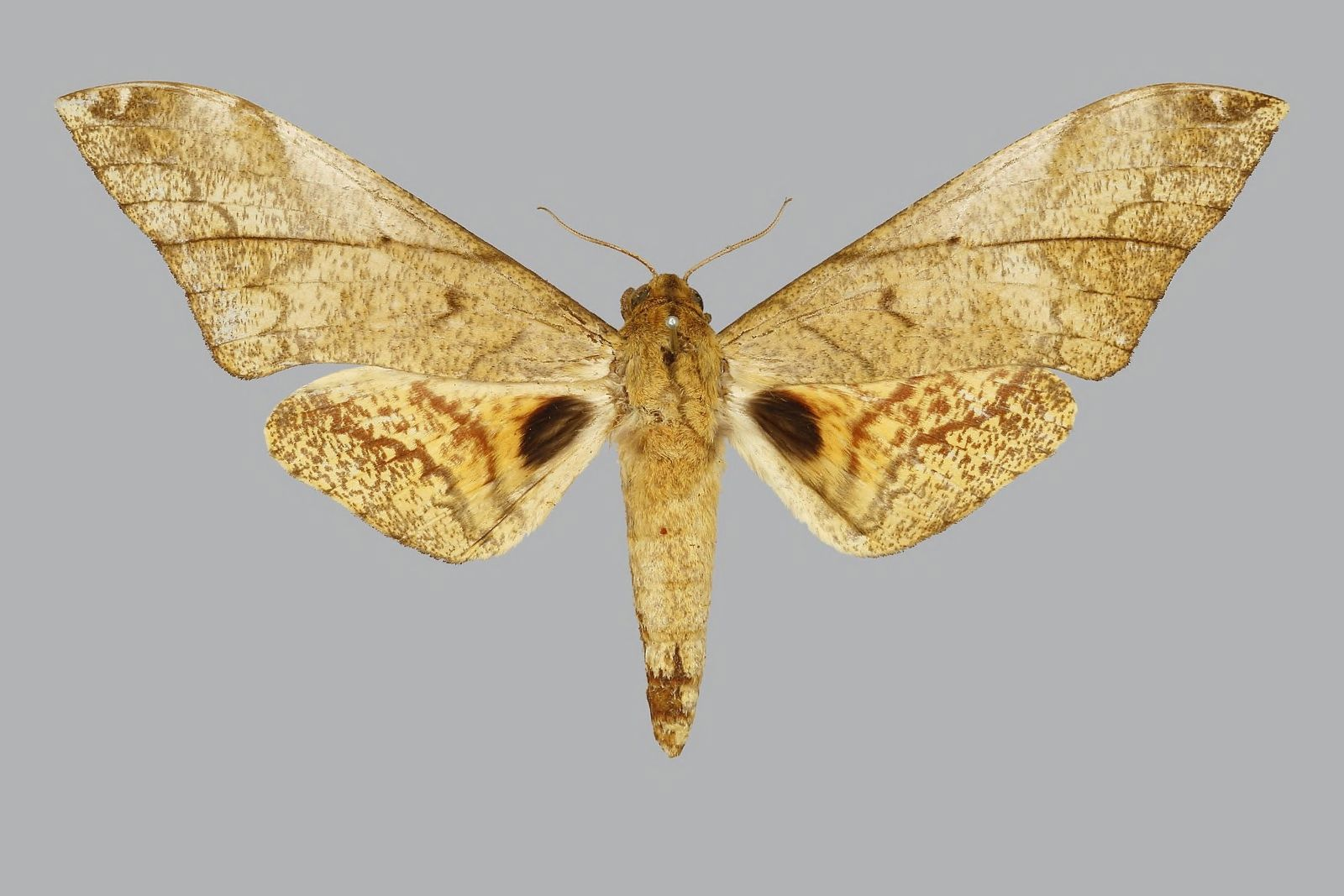
- Platysphinx vicaria vicaria

Scientific classification
- Kingdom: Animalia
- Phylum: Arthropoda
- Class: Insecta
- Order: Lepidoptera
- Family: Sphingidae
- Genus: Platysphinx
- Species: P. vicaria

Binomial name
- Platysphinx vicaria Jordan, 1920

= Platysphinx vicaria =

Species of moth

Platysphinx vicaria is a moth of the family Sphingidae. It is known from Sierra Leone to Nigeria, Cameroon and the Central African Republic.

== Subspecies ==
- Platysphinx vicaria vicaria
- Platysphinx vicaria basquini Pierre, 1989 (Gabon)
