= Philoponella oweni =

Scientific classification
- Kingdom: Animalia
- Phylum: Arthropoda
- Subphylum: Chelicerata
- Class: Arachnida
- Order: Araneae
- Infraorder: Araneomorphae
- Family: Uloboridae
- Genus: Philoponella
- Species: P. oweni

Binomial name
- Philoponella oweni (Chamberlin, 1924)

Synonyms
- Uloborus oweni Chamberlin, 1924

Species of spider

Philoponella oweni is a species of spider belonging to the family Uloboridae, the cribellate orb weavers. They are around 4.7–7.1 mm long in length and are primarily found in the arid southwestern parts of the United States. These spiders are most known for being semi-social, a rare trait within spiders. Semi-social, in the case of P. oweni, refers to the coexistence of facultatively communal and solitary females within the same habitat. These groups usually form in response to environmental factors, and often never involve true cooperation. This lack of true cooperation means these spiders do not share prey items, do not work together when spinning webs and do not care for one another's young. The coexistence of both solitary and communal species within the same habitat can be explained by both tactics have similar net reproductive success values. This was can be explained by comparing the number of eggs within egg cases to the number of surviving offspring for both tactics. The number of surviving offspring of communal and solitary beings does not vary significantly, which mostly due to the parasitism by pteromalid wasps (Arachnopteromalus dasys). These wasp which prefer consume and parasitize communal P. oweni webs and eggs, counteracting the increase of eggs per egg case that communal spiders tend to produce over solitary.

== Distribution and habitat ==
Philoponella oweni is primarily found in arid locations within the United States. These locations are more specifically the southwestern states. These spiders have also been found in northwestern Mexico, Colorado, Arizona and Sonora, Mexico.

== Diet ==
=== Feeding ===
There is a significant difference in the amount of time a female spider spends during feeding solely based on if she is communal or solitary. Only 22% of solitary females were found feeding each hour, whereas 56% of female communal spiders were found feeding each hour. This food intake has a direct effect on the female's egg production. When these spiders were on an adequate diet, regardless of solitary or communal, they produced an average of 23 eggs per egg case, compared to those on a poor diet, who only produced an average of 10 eggs per egg case. The higher feeding rate per hour within communal groups and increase in eggs produced when on a sufficient diet explains why these communal females on average produce more eggs per egg case than solitary females. Communal females must therefore be utilizing more energy in egg production than their solitary comrades.

Experimentally, reducing communal groups' numbers led to an increase in individual feeding rates. These results indicate that those living within these groups must be competing with each other for prey. However, in P. oweni there must be a benefit that these communal individuals are receiving in order for them to continue living together. The benefit is their ability to dominate and occupy areas that have a significantly high abundance of insects, which outweighs the cost of competition between each other.

== Webs ==
Web building is heavily affected by whether P. oweni is solitary or lives within a communal web. When solitary, female spiders will spin a prey-capture orb along with some irregular threads above and below it by itself. P. oweni communal spiders prefer to build their webs in sites that are more protected, such as in trees which are hollowed out or clefts among rocks, with the intention of building webs to last a long time. Because these spiders are limited in where they can build their webs, the same locations are used continuously every year by sub-sequential generations of spiders. When the number of web building attachment sites are scarce the population of P. oweni in the area tends to be more communal. But, when the number of locations for web attachment increases, these spider populations have more solitary individuals. In communal groups, every female will construct her own prey-capture orb. These orbs share support lines between them, and within these communal webs there is at least one retreat area that is used by all members within the groups. P. oweni do not remove their orbs on a daily basis. These spiders actually repair and use these orbs for multiple days. The webs of these spiders consist of tangles of 'space-webbing' also called 'knock-down threads' in addition to the orb they created themselves. The space-webbing often serves as a support for both solitary and/ or a communal female's web. Webs of communal groups of P. oweni occur in locations with significantly higher insect abundance compared to solitary females web locations. In regards to web maintenance between communal and solitary female spiders, there is no significant difference in the amount of orb replaced each day by either group on their webs. Likewise, the mean orb diameter of either group did not differ significantly.

== Reproduction and life cycle ==
=== Reproductive life cycle ===
Based on field observations, this spider's breeding season occurs annually. The subadults of P. oweni emerge from overwintering sites in the spring. In the case of primary study location, Arizona, this occurs in between early April and early June. After these subadults emerge, they begin spinning their orbs during this warm spring weather. This emergence is heavily dependent on the spider's elevation. Females are sedentary and remain at one location their whole lives while males often move from web to web. Mating then follows in late spring and into early summer. Males in general die by early July.

== Parental care ==
=== Oviposition and egg guarding ===
Into late June and early July, most females start to build and lay egg-cases, while some continue to lay eggs in September. When a female spider creates an egg case, it is given a distinctive color marking that corresponds with the mother. This allows for females to identify the mother of an egg case if they are living within a large communal group. The mother then moves into a safe "retreat area" and stays here with her egg-case stuck to her spinnerets and held by her fourth pair of legs. Her young emerge from their eggs about 20 days after the mother reaches this point. Once the young spiders have hatched from the egg case, the female discards it and leaves the retreat area to spin a new prey-capture orb.

=== Early life of spiderlings ===
Similar to many freshly hatched spiderlings from all types of species, the young P. oweni remain in the egg case for the first instar and molt, emerging from as a second instar spiderling. These spiderlings leave both an empty eggshell and their first exoskeleton behind when they leave. In general, the hatchlings stay in the maternal web initially, for varying lengths of time. These spiderlings that remain spin their own orbs within the meshwork of the adult female orbs. In general, most related and unrelated females tolerate the presence of spiderlings if they are living within a communal setting. As the season progresses, some immature spiderlings disperse out from their natal web while other spiderlings remain. Those that choose to remain will then emerge the following spring and occupy their natal locations, which is vital for them as there is often a lack of locations for web attachment. In some situations, the immature spiderlings actually bud off their parental web. They will cluster and build their interconnected webs farther and farther away from the central main section of the mother web until this connection is broken, at which point they will have completely relocated.

== Social behavior ==
Philoponella oweni facultatively forms communal groups. These groups tend to form in places where ideal web building sites are scarce and potential prey insects abound. Communal groups allow for multiple females to protect their site while still benefiting from the easy access prey. This communal behavior is not considered cooperation since these females do not collaborate in hunting, do not work together on spinning webs, and do not care for each other's young. The size of these factually communal webs can range from 2-40 adult females, with the addition of a number of adult males and immature offspring.

Both strategies result in a roughly equal number of surviving offspring. This is because the average number of eggs per egg case for females varies substantially depending on strategy. Communal females lay approximately 10-12 more eggs per egg case, which can be explained via feed rates; see diet. However, the communal females also experience significantly higher rates of parasitism. Pteromalid wasps parasitized 28% of communal egg cases compared to only 10% of solitary females egg cases.

== Enemies ==
=== Parasitism ===
Pteromalid wasps (Arachnopteromalus dasys) have been recorded parasitizing P. oweni egg-cases. This parasitism involves the wasp larvae feeding externally on the spider eggs contents, leaving only empty eggshells and killing all the spider eggs. This egg-parasitism has an impact on the reproductive success of individual females as well as the communal benefit from female spiders living within them. Although these communal groups are parasitized at higher rates than solitary individual, there has been no evidence of these communal groups forming any type of group defense against enemies.

Kleptoparasites also prey on P. oweni and have been frequently found in their webs. In general, these parasites utilize P. oweni webs or any host species as their natural habitats. The kleptoparasites found within P. oweni's web are Argyrodes, another species of spider. It has been observed that A. baboquivari predating on P. oweni 7/19 sightings within these spider webs. This predation was done by both male and female A. baboquivari and involved the consumption of both adults and immature eggs of P. oweni. These predatory spiders often inhabit or live near their hosts webs and steal their prey. The appearance of these kleptoparasites occurred more commonly within communal groups of P. oweni than solitary. Only 28% of the webs within one study were communal, but 50% of Argyrodes observations occurred with these communal spiders webs. This observation is not to be confused with predation. Predation itself did not occur enough for a statistical analysis to be calculated. Even so, half of those predatory events that occurred to P. oweni were within communal groups. It is speculated that this had occurred more frequently because predators may be able to remain within communal webs longer before being found. These communal webs are often larger as well, which could explain why these kleptoparasites are invading these spiders more frequently.
