= Anthonotha fragrans =

Scientific classification
- Kingdom: Plantae
- Clade: Tracheophytes
- Clade: Angiosperms
- Clade: Eudicots
- Clade: Rosids
- Order: Fabales
- Family: Fabaceae
- Genus: Anthonotha
- Species: A. fragrans

Binomial name
- Anthonotha fragrans (Baker f.) Exell & Hillc.

Species of plant

Anthonotha fragrans is a medium to large sized tree commonly found in the rainforest environments of West and Central Africa; it belongs to the Fabaceae family. Its sapwood exudes a white to creamy exudate.

== Description ==
The species can reach 45 meters tall and up to 1.3 meters in diameter. Leaves are paripinnately compound, with two to five pairs of leaflets per pinna, stipules detach at an early stage, petiole ranges between 0.5 and 1.5 cm long but can reach 4 cm in length; leaf-blade is elliptic to oblong in outline, its cross-section is terete shaped, the thick petiolule is 3–7 mm long, adaxial surface is glabrous while the lower surface is covered with appressed, dense, brown hairs. The hairy inflorescence is raceme type, axillary or terminal in the leaf axis, flowers are fragrant, bracts are ovate in outline and 1–2 mm long, pedicel is 2–5 mm long.

== Distribution ==
The species occurs in West and Central Africa from Guinea eastwards to the Congo basin. It is found on sandy or sandy loam soil in deciduous or semi-deciduous forests of the region.

== Ecology ==
Anthonotha fragrans is a host species to Clavulinaceae, Thelephoraceae and Boletaceae families of fungi in an ectomycorrhizal relationship.
