= Neuroxena aberrans =

Scientific classification
- Kingdom: Animalia
- Phylum: Arthropoda
- Class: Insecta
- Order: Lepidoptera
- Superfamily: Noctuoidea
- Family: Erebidae
- Subfamily: Arctiinae
- Genus: Neuroxena
- Species: N. aberrans

Binomial name
- Neuroxena aberrans Bethune-Baker, 1927

Species of moth

Neuroxena aberrans is a moth of the subfamily Arctiinae. It is found in Cameroon.

The wingspan is about 40 mm. Both wings are black, the forewings with only an oblique subhyaline bar across the wing just beyond the cell. The hindwings are uniform black on the upperside. The underside is yellow, with the apical area broadly black, gradually narrowing down the termen until it is quite finely black at the tornus. The inner marginal fold is yellow.
