= Neuroxena funereus =

Scientific classification
- Domain: Eukaryota
- Kingdom: Animalia
- Phylum: Arthropoda
- Class: Insecta
- Order: Lepidoptera
- Superfamily: Noctuoidea
- Family: Erebidae
- Subfamily: Arctiinae
- Genus: Neuroxena
- Species: N. funereus

Binomial name
- Neuroxena funereus (Rothschild, 1933)

Synonyms
- Creatonotos funereus Rothschild, 1933

Species of moth

Neuroxena funereus is a moth of the subfamily Arctiinae. It is found in Nigeria.
