= Neuroxena albofasciata =

Scientific classification
- Kingdom: Animalia
- Phylum: Arthropoda
- Class: Insecta
- Order: Lepidoptera
- Superfamily: Noctuoidea
- Family: Erebidae
- Subfamily: Arctiinae
- Genus: Neuroxena
- Species: N. albofasciata

Binomial name
- Neuroxena albofasciata (H. Druce, 1910)

Synonyms
- Eohemera albofasciata H. Druce, 1910

Species of moth

Neuroxena albofasciata is a moth of the subfamily Arctiinae first described by Herbert Druce in 1910. It is found in Cameroon.
