= Philoponella feroka =

Scientific classification
- Kingdom: Animalia
- Phylum: Arthropoda
- Subphylum: Chelicerata
- Class: Arachnida
- Order: Araneae
- Infraorder: Araneomorphae
- Family: Uloboridae
- Genus: Philoponella
- Species: P. feroka

Binomial name
- Philoponella feroka (Bradoo, 1979)

Spider species

Philoponella feroka is a spider of the Uloboridae family.

== Range ==
Kerala, Andhra Pradesh, Gujarat and Karnataka in India.

== Habitat ==
Paddy fields, fences, and shrubs found next to the highway.

== Ecology ==
Found on the webs of the social spider Stegodyphus sarasinorum.
