= Neuroxena obscurascens =

Scientific classification
- Domain: Eukaryota
- Kingdom: Animalia
- Phylum: Arthropoda
- Class: Insecta
- Order: Lepidoptera
- Superfamily: Noctuoidea
- Family: Erebidae
- Subfamily: Arctiinae
- Genus: Neuroxena
- Species: N. obscurascens

Binomial name
- Neuroxena obscurascens (Strand, 1909)

Synonyms
- Eohemera obscurascens Strand, 1909; Neuroxena obscurescens Vári & Kroon, 1986

Species of moth

Neuroxena obscurascens is a moth of the subfamily Arctiinae. It is found in Cameroon, Nigeria and South Africa.
