= Macrocossus coelebs =

Scientific classification
- Kingdom: Animalia
- Phylum: Arthropoda
- Clade: Pancrustacea
- Class: Insecta
- Order: Lepidoptera
- Family: Cossidae
- Genus: Macrocossus
- Species: M. coelebs

Binomial name
- Macrocossus coelebs Clench, 1959

Species of moth

Macrocossus coelebs is a moth in the family Cossidae. It is found in Namibia.
