= Neuroxena simulans =

Scientific classification
- Kingdom: Animalia
- Phylum: Arthropoda
- Class: Insecta
- Order: Lepidoptera
- Superfamily: Noctuoidea
- Family: Erebidae
- Subfamily: Arctiinae
- Genus: Neuroxena
- Species: N. simulans

Binomial name
- Neuroxena simulans (Toulgoët, 1971)

Synonyms
- Eohemera simulans Toulgoët, 1971

Species of moth

Neuroxena simulans is a moth of the subfamily Arctiinae first described by Hervé de Toulgoët in 1971. It is found in Madagascar.
