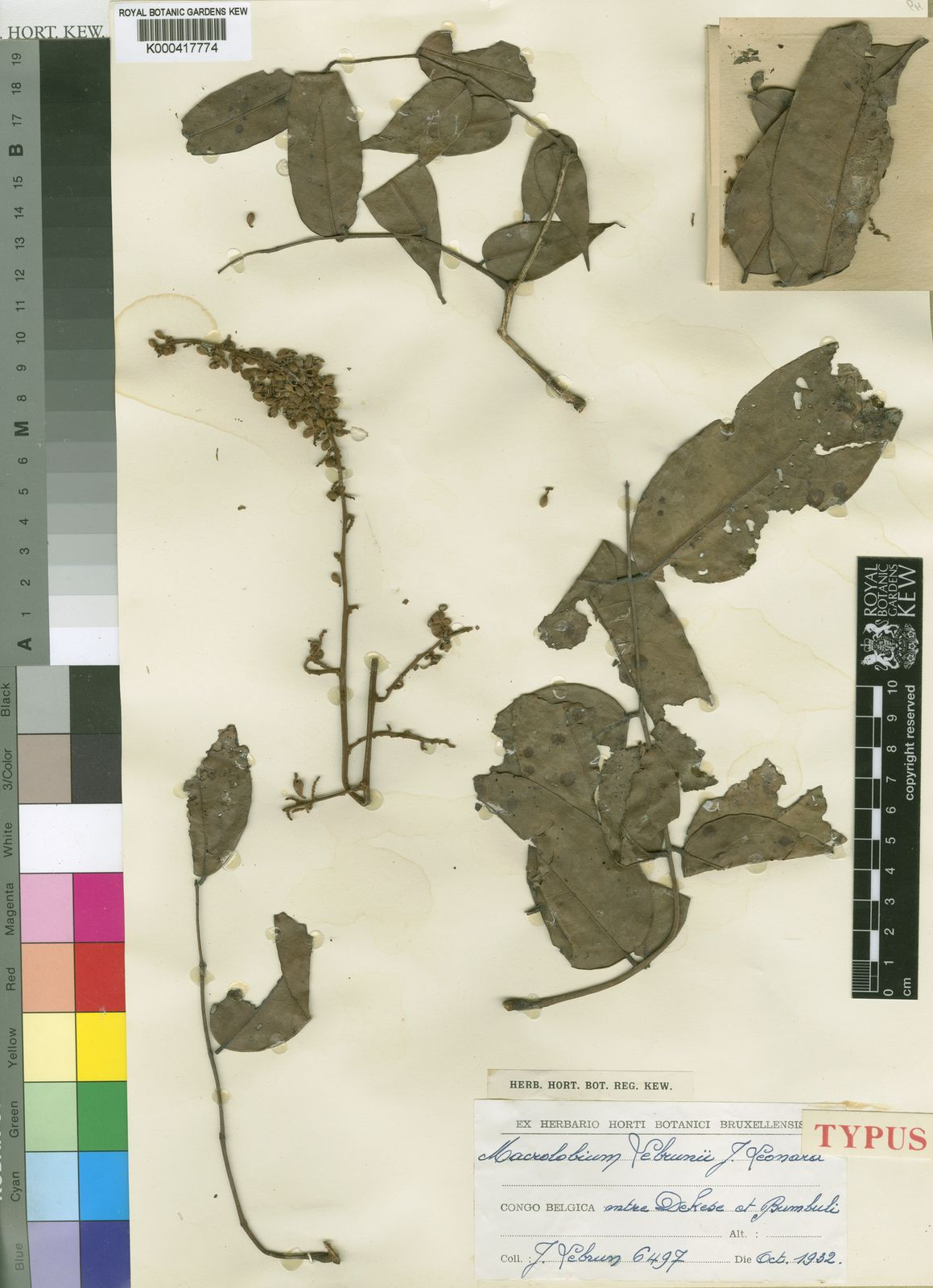
- A specimen of Englerodendron lebrunii from Royal Botanic Gardens Kew

Conservation status
- Vulnerable (IUCN 3.1)

Scientific classification
- Kingdom: Plantae
- Clade: Tracheophytes
- Clade: Angiosperms
- Clade: Eudicots
- Clade: Rosids
- Order: Fabales
- Family: Fabaceae
- Genus: Englerodendron
- Species: E. lebrunii

Binomial name
- Englerodendron lebrunii (J.Léonard) Estrella & Ojeda, 2019

Synonyms
- Anthonotha lebrunii (J.Léonard) J.Léonard, 1957; Isomacrolobium lebrunii (J.Léonard) Aubrév. & Pellegr. ex Breteler, 2008; Macrolobium lebrunii J.Léonard, 1952

= Englerodendron lebrunii =

Species of legume

Englerodendron lebrunii is a species of tree in the family Fabaceae. It is found only in Democratic Republic of the Congo. It is threatened by habitat loss.
