= Neuroxena fulleri =

Scientific classification
- Domain: Eukaryota
- Kingdom: Animalia
- Phylum: Arthropoda
- Class: Insecta
- Order: Lepidoptera
- Superfamily: Noctuoidea
- Family: Erebidae
- Subfamily: Arctiinae
- Genus: Neuroxena
- Species: N. fulleri

Binomial name
- Neuroxena fulleri (H. Druce, 1883)

Synonyms
- Nyctemera fulleri H. Druce, 1883

Species of moth

Neuroxena fulleri is a moth of the subfamily Arctiinae first described by Herbert Druce in 1883. It is found in Cameroon, Equatorial Guinea, Gabon and Nigeria.
