= Vanderbylia robiniophila =

Scientific classification
- Kingdom: Fungi
- Division: Basidiomycota
- Class: Agaricomycetes
- Order: Polyporales
- Family: Polyporaceae
- Genus: Vanderbylia
- Species: V. robiniophila

Binomial name
- Vanderbylia robiniophila (Murrill) B.K. Cui & Y.C. Dai

Synonyms
- List: Trametes robiniophila Murrill; Perenniporia robiniophila (Murrill) Ryvarden; Polyporus robiniophilus (Murrill) Lloyd; Poria robiniophila (Murrill) Ginns

Species of fungus

Vanderbylia robiniophila is a species of polypore fungus in the family Polyporaceae.
