= Philoponella operosa =

Cape Hackled Orb-Web Spider

Scientific classification
- Kingdom: Animalia
- Phylum: Arthropoda
- Subphylum: Chelicerata
- Class: Arachnida
- Order: Araneae
- Infraorder: Araneomorphae
- Family: Uloboridae
- Genus: Philoponella
- Species: P. operosa

Binomial name
- Philoponella operosa (Simon, 1897)

Synonyms
- Uloborus operosus Simon, 1897

Species of spider

Philoponella operosa is a species of spider in the family Uloboridae. It is endemic to South Africa and is commonly known as the Cape hackled orb-web spider.

== Distribution ==
Philoponella operosa is found only in South Africa, where it has been recorded from Addo Elephant National Park in the Eastern Cape.

== Habitat and ecology ==
The habitat and ecology of this species are unknown.

== Conservation ==
Philoponella operosa is listed as Data Deficient by the South African National Biodiversity Institute due to unknown provenance and taxonomic reasons. More sampling is needed to collect males and to determine the species range.

== Taxonomy ==
Philoponella operosa was originally described by Eugène Simon in 1897 as Uloborus operosus with the type locality given only as "Colonie du Cap". The status of the species remains obscure. The species has not been revised and is known only from females, which have not been illustrated.
