= Neuroxena rectilineata =

Scientific classification
- Kingdom: Animalia
- Phylum: Arthropoda
- Class: Insecta
- Order: Lepidoptera
- Superfamily: Noctuoidea
- Family: Erebidae
- Subfamily: Arctiinae
- Genus: Neuroxena
- Species: N. rectilineata

Binomial name
- Neuroxena rectilineata (Toulgoët, 1972)

Synonyms
- Eohemera rectilinea Toulgoët, 1972

Species of moth

Neuroxena rectilineata is a moth of the subfamily Arctiinae first described by Hervé de Toulgoët in 1972. It is found on Mayotte in the Comoro Islands.
