= Englerodendron leptorrhachis =

Conservation status
- Critically Endangered (IUCN 2.3)

Scientific classification
- Kingdom: Plantae
- Clade: Tracheophytes
- Clade: Angiosperms
- Clade: Eudicots
- Clade: Rosids
- Order: Fabales
- Family: Fabaceae
- Genus: Englerodendron
- Species: E. leptorrhachis

Binomial name
- Englerodendron leptorrhachis (Harms) Estrella & Ojeda, 2019

Synonyms
- Anthonotha leptorrhachis (Harms) J.Léonard, 1955; Isomacrolobium leptorrhachis (Harms) Aubrév. & Pellegr., 1958; Macrolobium leptorrhachis Harms, 1902

Species of legume

Englerodendron leptorrhachis is a species of tree in the family Fabaceae. It is endemic to Cameroon. Its natural habitat is subtropical or tropical dry forests. It is threatened by habitat loss.
