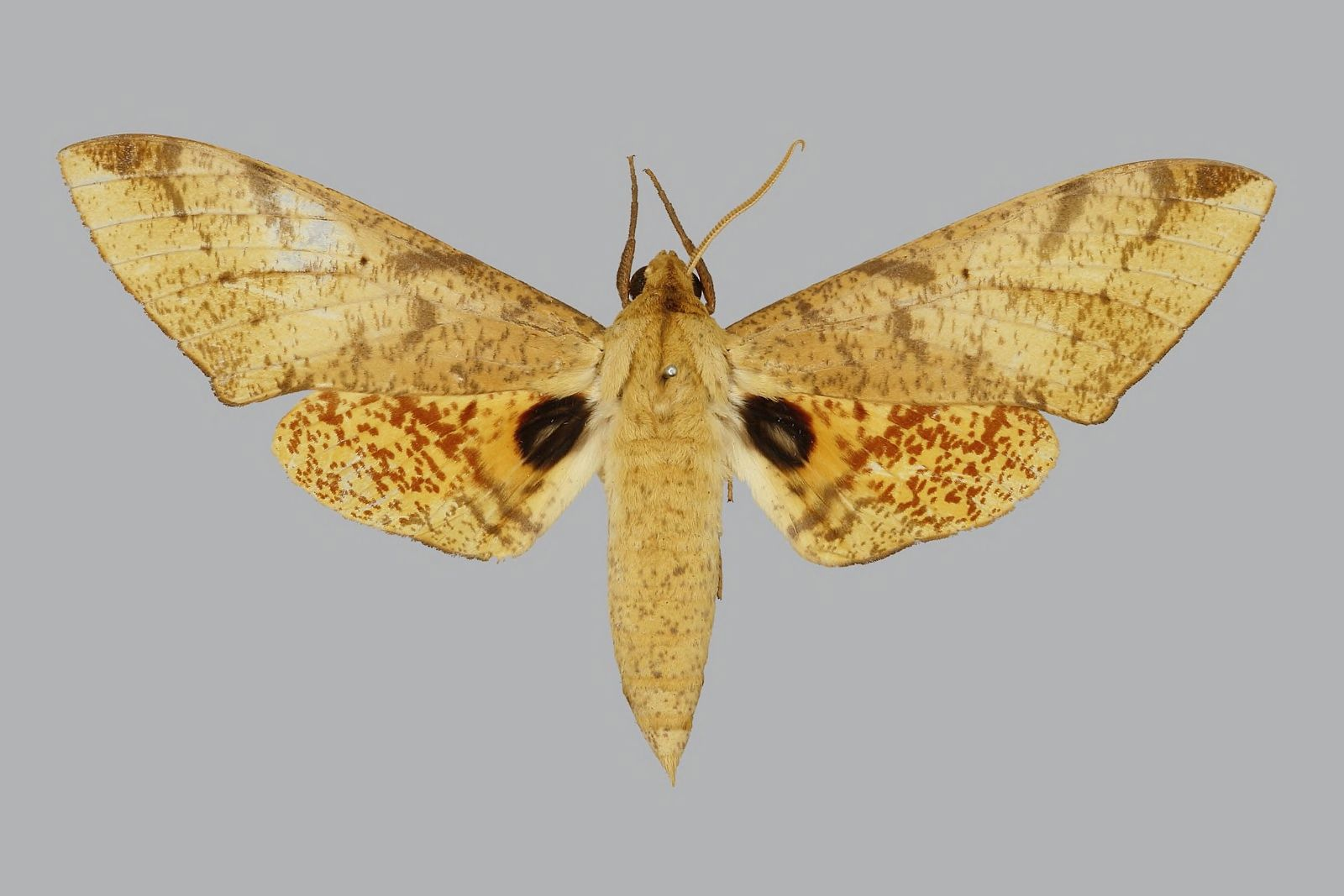

Scientific classification
- Kingdom: Animalia
- Phylum: Arthropoda
- Class: Insecta
- Order: Lepidoptera
- Family: Sphingidae
- Genus: Platysphinx
- Species: P. phyllis

Binomial name
- Platysphinx phyllis Rothschild & Jordan, 1903

= Platysphinx phyllis =

Species of moth

Platysphinx phyllis is a moth of the family Sphingidae. It is known from Sierra Leone to Nigeria.
