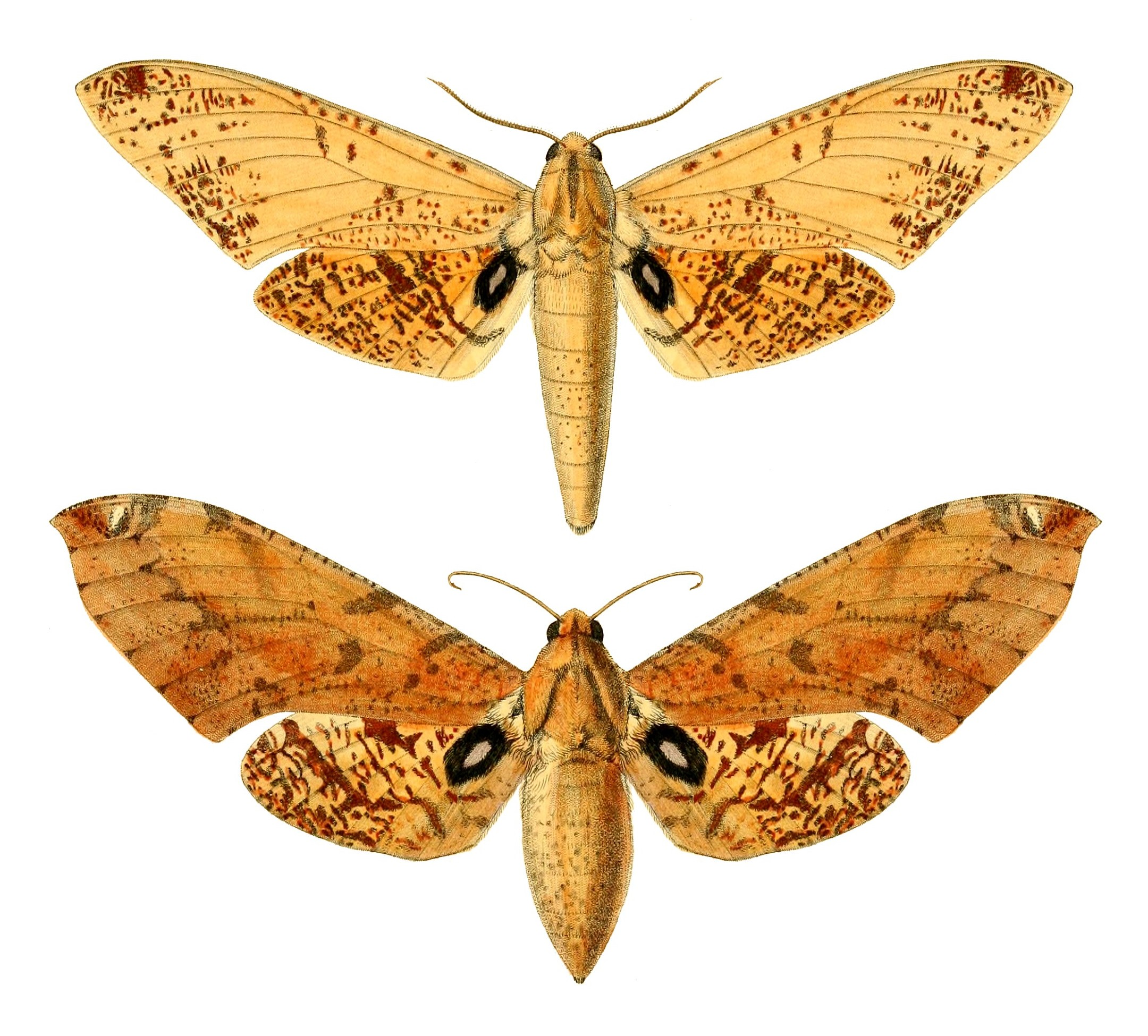

Scientific classification
- Kingdom: Animalia
- Phylum: Arthropoda
- Class: Insecta
- Order: Lepidoptera
- Family: Sphingidae
- Genus: Platysphinx
- Species: P. stigmatica

Binomial name
- Platysphinx stigmatica (Mabille, 1878)

Synonyms
- Basiana stigmatica Mabille, 1878; Basiana conspersa Dewitz

= Platysphinx stigmatica =

Species of moth

Platysphinx stigmatica is a moth of the family Sphingidae. It is known from forests from Nigeria to the Congo, Angola and western Uganda.
