= Englerodendron =

Scientific classification
- Kingdom: Plantae
- Clade: Tracheophytes
- Clade: Angiosperms
- Clade: Eudicots
- Clade: Rosids
- Order: Fabales
- Family: Fabaceae
- Subfamily: Detarioideae
- Tribe: Amherstieae
- Genus: Englerodendron; Harms, 1907

Type species
- Englerodendron usambarense Harms

Species
- 17; see text

Synonyms
- Isomacrolobium Aubrév. & Pellegr.; Leonardendron Aubrév; Pseudomacrolobium Hauman; Triplisomeris Aubrév. & Pellegr.

Genus of legumes

Englerodendron is a small genus of legumes belonging to the family Fabaceae, that are native to tropical Africa.

It is found in the countries of Cameroon, Congo, Equatorial Guinea, Gabon, Ghana, Guinea, Ivory Coast, Liberia, Nigeria, Congo, Sierra Leone, Tanzania and Zaire.

The genus name of Englerodendron is in honour of Adolf Engler (1844–1930), a German botanist, and also; Dendron, a Greek word meaning "tree". It was first published and described in Bot. Jahrb. Syst. Vol.40 on page 27 in 1907.

A recent study indicates that an early Miocene (Aquitanian) tropical moist forest from Ethiopia may represent a monodominant forest dominated by a prehistoric species of Englerodendron, Englerodendron mulugetanum.

== Species ==
It contains the following species:

- Englerodendron brachyrhachis (Breteler) Estrella & Ojeda
- Englerodendron conchyliophorum (Pellegr.) Breteler
- Englerodendron explicans (Baill.) Estrella & Ojeda
- Englerodendron gabunense (J.Léonard) Breteler
- Englerodendron graciliflorum (Harms) Estrella & Ojeda
- Englerodendron hallei (Aubrév.) Estrella & Ojeda
- Englerodendron isopetalum (Harms) Breteler & Wieringa
- Englerodendron korupense Burgt
- Englerodendron lebrunii (J.Léonard) Estrella & Ojeda
- Englerodendron leptorrhachis (Harms) Estrella & Ojeda
- Englerodendron macranthum (J.Léonard) Lachenaud, 2022
- Englerodendron mengei (De Wild.) Estrella & Ojeda
- † Englerodendron mulugetanum Pan, Jacobs, Bush, Estrella, Grímsson, Herendeen, Burgt et Currano, 2023 - extinct
- Englerodendron nguemae Lachenaud & Bidault, 2022
- Englerodendron nigericum (Baker f.) Estrella & Ojeda
- Englerodendron obanense (Baker f.) Estrella & Ojeda
- Englerodendron sargosii Pellegr.
- Englerodendron triplisomere (Pellegr.) Estrella & Ojeda
- Englerodendron usambarense Harms
- Englerodendron vignei (Hoyle) Estrella & Ojeda

== Phylogeny ==
The following relationships have been suggested for the genus Englerodendron:

- - Anthonotha (outgroup)
  - Englerodendron
    - - Englerodendron explicans
      - - Englerodendron vignei
        - Englerodendron obanense
    - - - - Englerodendron conchyliophorum
          - - Englerodendron isopetalum
            - Englerodendron nigericum
        - - Englerodendron leptorrhachis
          - - Englerodendron brachyrhachis
            - Englerodendron triplisomere
      - - Englerodendron mengei
        - - Englerodendron usambarense
          - - Englerodendron lebrunii
            - - Englerodendron gabunense
              - Englerodendron graciliflorum
              - Englerodendron korupense
