= Neuroxena medioflavus =

Scientific classification
- Kingdom: Animalia
- Phylum: Arthropoda
- Clade: Pancrustacea
- Class: Insecta
- Order: Lepidoptera
- Superfamily: Noctuoidea
- Family: Erebidae
- Subfamily: Arctiinae
- Genus: Neuroxena
- Species: N. medioflavus

Binomial name
- Neuroxena medioflavus (Rothschild, 1935)

Synonyms
- Creatonotos medioflavus Rothschild, 1935

Species of moth

Neuroxena medioflavus is a moth of the subfamily Arctiinae. It is found in Ghana and Nigeria.
