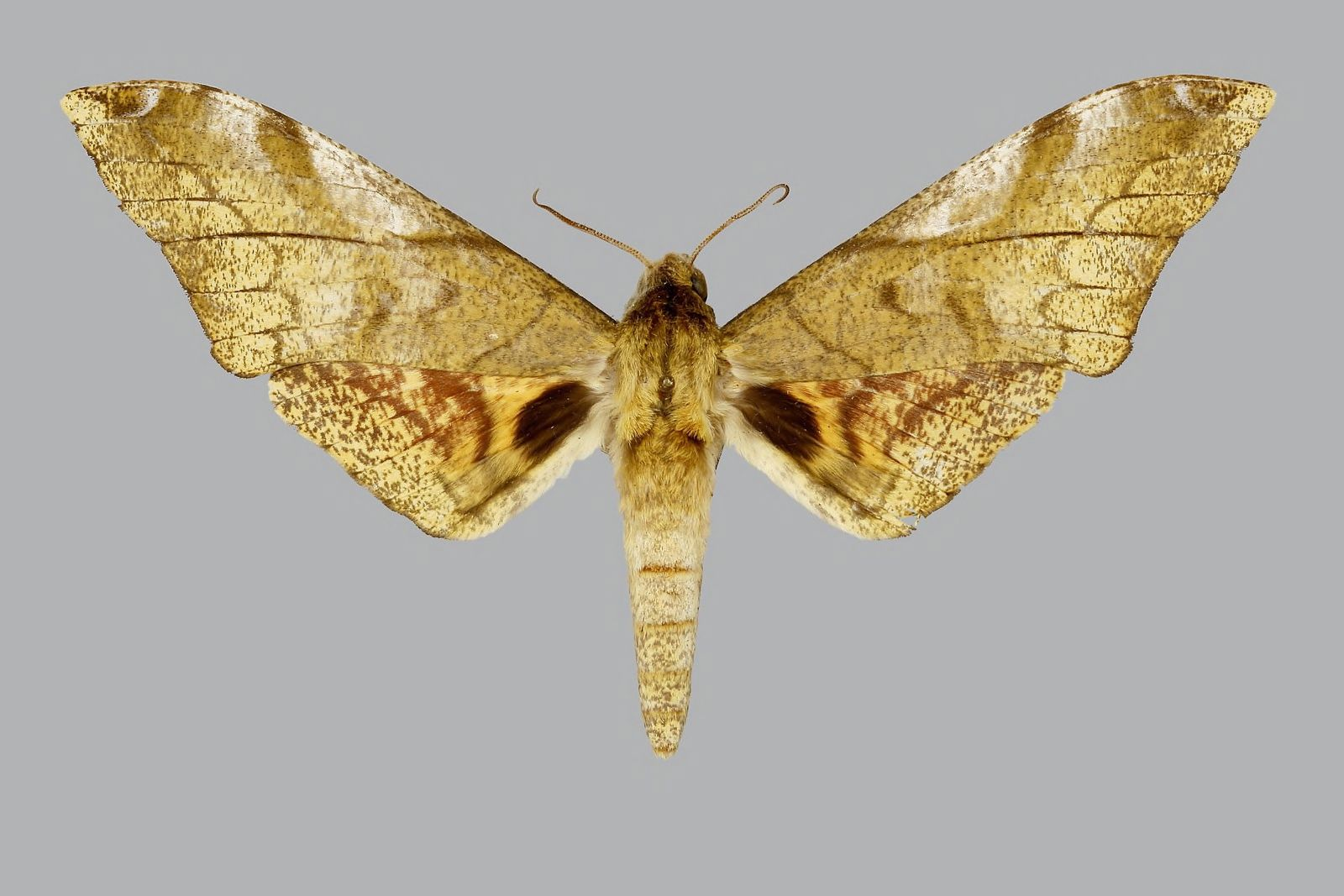
- Platysphinx constrigilis constrigilis

Scientific classification
- Domain: Eukaryota
- Kingdom: Animalia
- Phylum: Arthropoda
- Class: Insecta
- Order: Lepidoptera
- Family: Sphingidae
- Genus: Platysphinx
- Species: P. constrigilis

Binomial name
- Platysphinx constrigilis (Walker, 1869)

Synonyms
- Ambulyx constrigilis Walker, 1869; Platysphinx lemoulti Clark 1936; Platysphinx bituberculatus Darge, 1986

= Platysphinx constrigilis =

Species of moth

Platysphinx constrigilis is a moth of the family Sphingidae. It was described by Francis Walker in 1869. It is known from the forests of Sub-Saharan Africa.

The wingspan is 55–60 mm (2.2–2.4 in). The larvae feed on Alchornea cordifolia, Anthonotha macrophylla, Baphia pubescens, Lonchocarpus cyanescens, and Millettia zechiana.

== Subspecies ==
There are two subspecies:

- Platysphinx constrigilis constrigilis (Liberia to Angola and Kenya)
- Platysphinx constrigilis lamtoi Pierre, 1989 (Ivory Coast)
