= Phylloxiphia goodii =

Scientific classification
- Domain: Eukaryota
- Kingdom: Animalia
- Phylum: Arthropoda
- Class: Insecta
- Order: Lepidoptera
- Family: Sphingidae
- Genus: Phylloxiphia
- Species: P. goodii

Binomial name
- Phylloxiphia goodii (Holland, 1889)

Synonyms
- Phylloxiphia goodi; Polyptychus goodii Holland, 1889; Libyoclanis goodii; Libyoclanis bainbridgei Rothschild & Jordan, 1906

Species of moth

Phylloxiphia goodii is a moth of the family Sphingidae. It is known from Sierra Leone, Liberia, Cameroon, the Central African Republic, Gabon, the Democratic Republic of the Congo and the Republic of the Congo.
