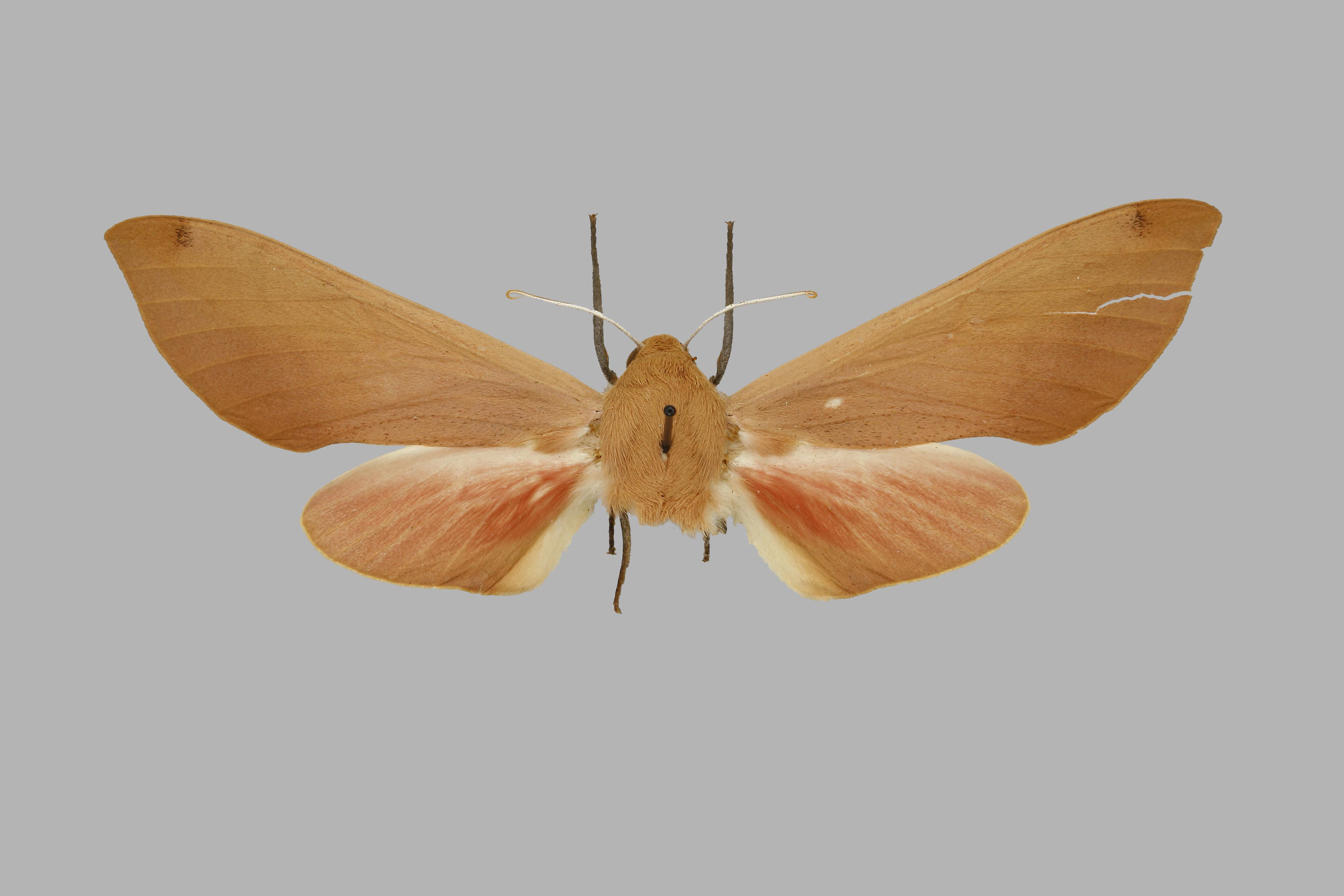
- Phylloxiphia metria

Scientific classification
- Domain: Eukaryota
- Kingdom: Animalia
- Phylum: Arthropoda
- Class: Insecta
- Order: Lepidoptera
- Family: Sphingidae
- Tribe: Smerinthini
- Genus: Phylloxiphia; Rothschild & Jordan, 1903

Synonyms
- Libyoclanis Rothschild & Jordan, 1906

= Phylloxiphia =

Genus of moths

Phylloxiphia is a genus of moths in the family Sphingidae erected by Walter Rothschild and Karl Jordan in 1903.

== Species ==
- Phylloxiphia bicolor (Rothschild, 1894)
- Phylloxiphia formosa Schultze, 1914
- Phylloxiphia goodii (Holland, 1889)
- Phylloxiphia illustris (Rothschild & Jordan, 1906)
- Phylloxiphia karschi (Rothschild & Jordan, 1903)
- Phylloxiphia metria (Jordan, 1920)
- Phylloxiphia oberthueri Rothschild & Jordan, 1903
- Phylloxiphia oweni (Carcasson, 1968)
- Phylloxiphia punctum (Rothschild, 1907)
- Phylloxiphia vicina (Rothschild & Jordan, 1915)
