= Phylloxiphia bicolor =

Scientific classification
- Domain: Eukaryota
- Kingdom: Animalia
- Phylum: Arthropoda
- Class: Insecta
- Order: Lepidoptera
- Family: Sphingidae
- Genus: Phylloxiphia
- Species: P. bicolor

Binomial name
- Phylloxiphia bicolor (Rothschild, 1894)

Synonyms
- Clanis bicolor Rothschild, 1894; Libyoclanis bicolor

Species of moth

Phylloxiphia bicolor is a moth of the family Sphingidae. It is known from forests from Sierra Leone to the Congo and Angola.
