= Macrocossus sidamo =

Scientific classification
- Kingdom: Animalia
- Phylum: Arthropoda
- Class: Insecta
- Order: Lepidoptera
- Family: Cossidae
- Genus: Macrocossus
- Species: M. sidamo

Binomial name
- Macrocossus sidamo (Rougeot, 1977)

Synonyms
- Cossus sidamo Rougeot, 1977

Species of moth

Macrocossus sidamo is a moth in the family Cossidae. It is found in Ethiopia.
