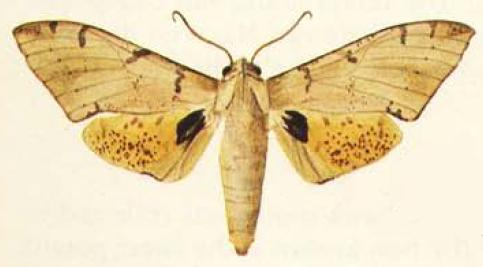

Scientific classification
- Domain: Eukaryota
- Kingdom: Animalia
- Phylum: Arthropoda
- Class: Insecta
- Order: Lepidoptera
- Family: Sphingidae
- Genus: Platysphinx
- Species: P. piabilis

Binomial name
- Platysphinx piabilis (Distant, 1897)

Synonyms
- Ambulyx piabilis Distant, 1897; Platysphinx bourkei Trimen, 1910

= Platysphinx piabilis =

Species of moth

Platysphinx piabilis is a moth of the family Sphingidae first described by William Lucas Distant in 1897. It is known from savanna and other open habitats in southern and eastern Africa.
