= Philoponella vicina =

Scientific classification
- Domain: Eukaryota
- Kingdom: Animalia
- Phylum: Arthropoda
- Subphylum: Chelicerata
- Class: Arachnida
- Order: Araneae
- Infraorder: Araneomorphae
- Family: Uloboridae
- Genus: Philoponella
- Species: P. vicina

Binomial name
- Philoponella vicina (O. P.-Cambridge, 1899)

Synonyms
- Uloborus vicinus

Species of spider

Philoponella vicina is a species of spider that does not use venom (characteristic of Uloboridae), but instead wraps its prey in hundreds of metres of spider silk to crush it to death. The spider then goes on to regurgitate digestive fluid into the shroud, then consuming the pre-digested liquid.

Stabilimenta occur in more than half of constructed orbs, most commonly with two lines pointing up and down from the spider. If only one radius is constructed, it is mostly constructed above the spider. Some spiders build resting webs that are not used for prey capture. These also sometimes feature stabilimenta, suggesting that prey capture plays no role in its construction. When disturbed, the spider flees up one of the stabilimentum lines.

== Distribution ==
The spider is found natively from Mexico to Costa Rica.
