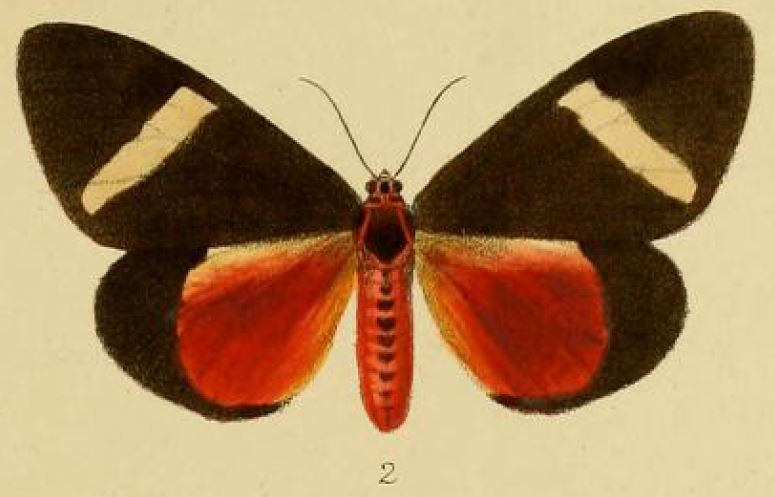

Scientific classification
- Domain: Eukaryota
- Kingdom: Animalia
- Phylum: Arthropoda
- Class: Insecta
- Order: Lepidoptera
- Superfamily: Noctuoidea
- Family: Erebidae
- Subfamily: Arctiinae
- Genus: Neuroxena
- Species: N. flammea

Binomial name
- Neuroxena flammea (Schaus & Clements, 1893)

Synonyms
- Aletis flammea Schaus & Clements, 1893

= Neuroxena flammea =

Species of moth

Neuroxena flammea is a moth of the family Erebidae described by William Schaus and W. G. Clements in 1893. It is found in Ghana, Liberia and Sierra Leone.
