= Anthonotha macrophylla =

Scientific classification
- Kingdom: Plantae
- Clade: Tracheophytes
- Clade: Angiosperms
- Clade: Eudicots
- Clade: Rosids
- Order: Fabales
- Family: Fabaceae
- Genus: Anthonotha
- Species: A. macrophylla

Binomial name
- Anthonotha macrophylla P.Beauv.

Species of plant

Anthonotha macrophylla is a shrub to small understory tree within the family Fabaceae. It is endemic to the rain forest regions of West Africa and it is the most common of species within the Anthonotha genus in Africa.

== Description ==
A shrub or small sized tree with a spreading crown that can grow up to 20 m tall and reach a diameter of 60 cm, its branches are greyish to pale-brown in color, they are sometimes glabrescent or with short appressed hairs. Leaves paripinnately compound arranged with 2–4 pairs of leaflets per pinnae, petiole and rachis are somewhat terete, the former is 1–7 cm long, and the latter is 2.5–11 cm long; leaflets are obovate to elliptic in outline. Inflorescence is a loose raceme panicle, axillary flowered on shoot or below leaves; pedicel is 3–8 mm long, bracteoles can be up to 1 mm thick with an elliptical outline and glabrous edges, petal is white to yellow in color. Fruit is an elliptical to oblong pod, dark brown to blackish in color, 4–7 seeded.

== Distribution ==
Occurs in the forest environments of West Africa from Senegal eastwards to the Central African regions.

== Uses ==
Seed is used in some food preparations, stem bark is used to treat venereal and intestinal ailments and a leaf decoction is used to teat jaundice, Stems are used as staking materials for yam and wood is obtained as firewood.
