= Phylloxiphia formosa =

Scientific classification
- Domain: Eukaryota
- Kingdom: Animalia
- Phylum: Arthropoda
- Class: Insecta
- Order: Lepidoptera
- Family: Sphingidae
- Genus: Phylloxiphia
- Species: P. formosa

Binomial name
- Phylloxiphia formosa Schultze, 1914

Synonyms
- Libyoclanis major Rothschild & Jordan, 1915

Species of moth

Phylloxiphia formosa is a moth of the family Sphingidae. It is found from Sierra Leone, Liberia and Ivory Coast to the Central African Republic, Uganda and Tanzania, south to Zambia.
