= Phylloxiphia vicina =

Scientific classification
- Domain: Eukaryota
- Kingdom: Animalia
- Phylum: Arthropoda
- Class: Insecta
- Order: Lepidoptera
- Family: Sphingidae
- Genus: Phylloxiphia
- Species: P. vicina

Binomial name
- Phylloxiphia vicina (Rothschild & Jordan, 1915)

Synonyms
- Libyoclanis vicina Rothschild & Jordan, 1915

Species of moth

Phylloxiphia vicina is a moth of the family Sphingidae. It is found from Liberia to Nigeria and to Tanzania and Zambia.
