= Paul Andries van der Bijl =

South African mycologist (1888-1939)

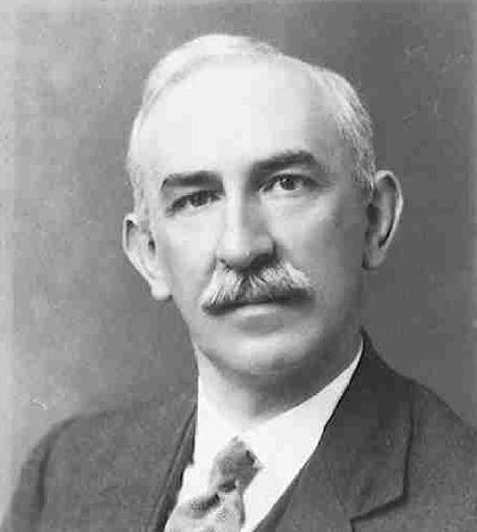
- Born: May 23, 1888
- Died: 1939 (aged 50–51)
- Occupation: mycologist
- Known for: work on polypores or bracket fungi

Paul Andries van der Bijl or alternatively Van der Byl (23 May 1888 – 1939) was a South African mycologist known for his work on polypores or bracket fungi.

== Life and work ==
Born on his father's farm in the Paarl district of Cape Colony, he graduated from the University of Stellenbosch (formerly Victoria College) in 1909.

In 1911, Van der Bijl was appointed mycologist and phytopathologist at the South African National Collection of Fungi. In 1914 he was proposed as a member of the Linnean Society of London. In 1915 he headed the newly established phytopathological laboratory at the National Herbarium. He became the first professor of plant pathology in South Africa at the University of Stellenbosch in 1921. Stefanus Johannes Du Plessis (1908–1995) was a student of his.

== Publications ==
- Van der Bijl PA. (1916). "Note on Polyporus lucidus Leyss., and its effect on the wood of the willow". South African Journal of Science. 13: 506–515.
- Van der Bijl PA. (1917). "Fomes applanatus (Pers.) Wallr. in South Africa, and its effect on the wood of Black ironwood trees (Olea laurofolia)". South African Journal of Science. 14: 485–492.
- Van der Bijl PA. (1921). "Note on Lysurus woodii (MacOwan), Lloyd". Transactions of the Royal Society of South Africa. 9 (2): 191–193. Bibcode:1921TRSSA...9..191V. doi:10.1080/00359192109520209.
- Van der Bijl PA. (1921). "South African Xylarias occurring around Durban, Natal". Transactions of the Royal Society of South Africa. 9 (2): 181–183. Bibcode:1921TRSSA...9..181V. doi:10.1080/00359192109520206.
- Van der Bijl PA. (1921). "The genus Tulostoma in South Africa". Transactions of the Royal Society of South Africa. 9 (2): 185–186. Bibcode:1921TRSSA...9..185V. doi:10.1080/00359192109520207.
- Van der Bijl PA. (1922). "A contribution to our understanding of the Polyporaceae of South Africa". South African Journal of Science: 243–293.
- Van der Bijl PA. (1922). "Some South African stereums". Transactions of the Royal Society of South Africa. 10 (1): 151–157. Bibcode:1922TRSSA..10..151V. doi:10.1080/00359192209519276.
- Van der Bijl PA. (1924). "Descriptions of additional South African Polyporeae" in South African Journal of Science". 21: 308–313.
