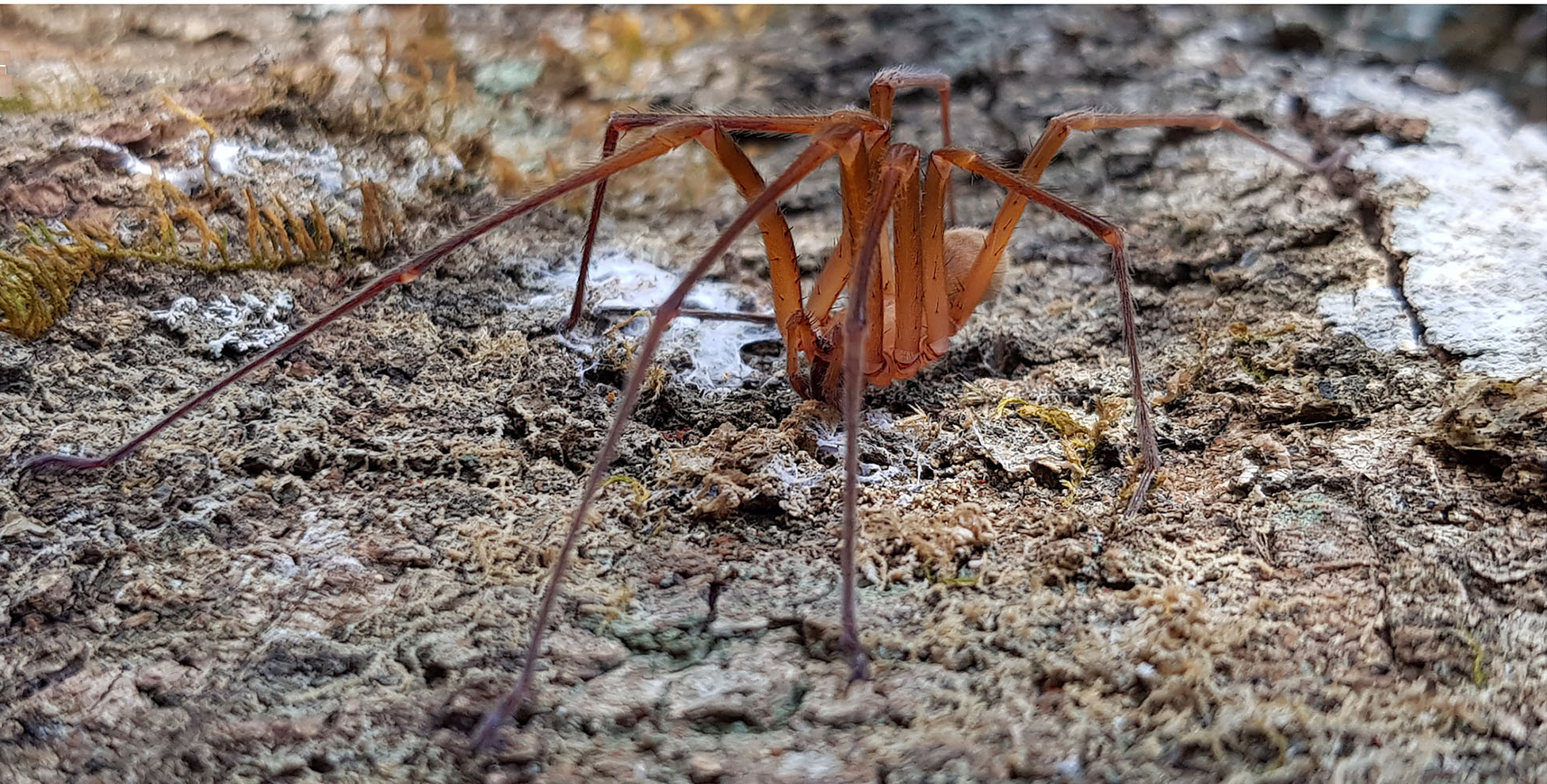
- Progradungula barringtonensis holotype male

Scientific classification
- Kingdom: Animalia
- Phylum: Arthropoda
- Subphylum: Chelicerata
- Class: Arachnida
- Order: Araneae
- Infraorder: Araneomorphae
- Family: Gradungulidae
- Genus: Progradungula
- Species: P. barringtonensis

Binomial name
- Progradungula barringtonensis Michalik & Smith, 2024

= Progradungula barringtonensis =

Species of spider

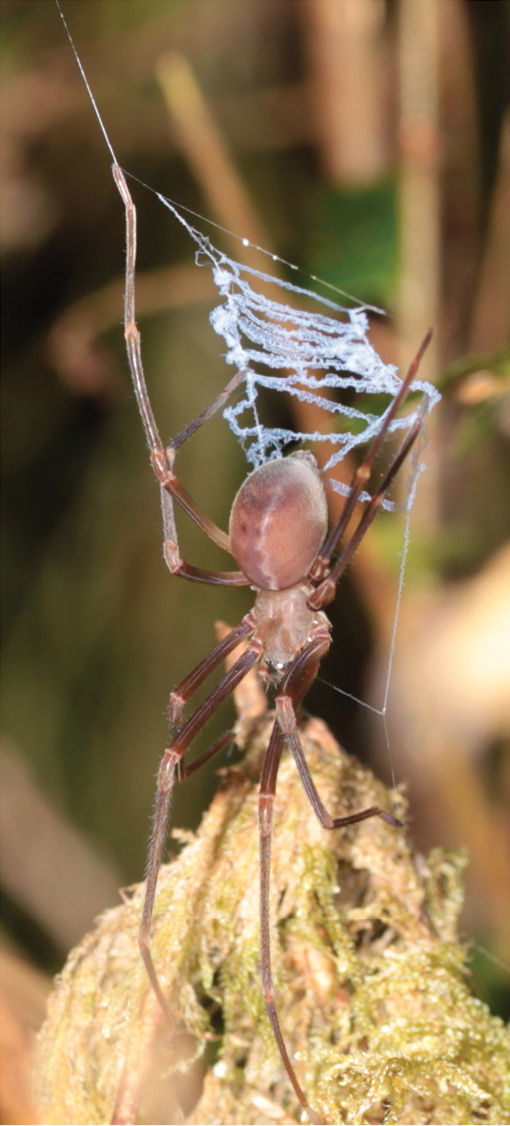
P. otwayensis with web ladder

Progradungula barringtonensis is a species of cribellate spider endemic to the Barrington Tops National Park of New South Wales, Australia. It is one of only three species in the gradungulid genus Progradungula. At the time of description only an adult male and a number of juveniles were known. Progradungula has been described as a "ghost of Gondwana", surviving through several mass extinctions in relictual populations across Australia.

== Anatomy and morphology ==
Arachnologists Peter Michalik and Helen Smith DNA barcoded both the adult holotype male and an immature individual of unidentified sex. However, they only took morphologic measurement for the type description from the holotype, opting not to give a description of the immature individual. Proportionally, P. barringtonensis males are the largest of the genus, followed by P. otwayensis and then P. carraiensis as the smallest. The carapace is oval in outline, being 5.1 mm (3/16 in) at the widest and 7.5 mm (5/16 in) long. The leg span for the species is up to 10 cm (3.9 in). The abdomen is more elongated than the carapace, with a length of 7.6 mm (5/16 in) and a width of only 4.6 mm (3/16 in). As with other spiders in the family Gradungulidae, P. barringtonensis lacks the spinnerets found in most web weaving spider groups, instead it is cribellate, having a "sieve plate" structure, called the cribellum, which is covered with numerous tiny "spigots" which produce thin silk strands. The cribellum in the male is described as "vestigial" with a narrow silk producing field, and the calamistrum, silk combing hairs on the hind legs metatarsus are similarly smaller in size.

The male has a yellowish brown coloration to the upper cephalothorax carapace which darkens around the eyes. The sternum on the underside of the cephalothorax is also yellowish brown which darkens to a reddish brown marginal rim around the edges. The abdomen is a uniform dark brown while the legs are all yellowish brown. Dark red-dish brown is found across the chelicerae, maxillae and labium in the mouth region.

== Ecology and behavior ==
Like its sister species Progradungula otwayensis, P. barringtonensis inhabits old-growth Antarctic beech forests and were found associated with old hollow tree-trunks. While P. otwayensis is thought to preferentially choose the oldest Nothofagus trunks, the adult and juvenile studied by the research team were taken from a eucalyptus species tree. Other webs and individuals were observed at ground level in very dark hollows formed by dislodged roots and similar cavities.

Progradungula barringtonensis individuals build webs with a "ladder" shape by trailing a zigzag of sticky cribellum silk across two close to parallel non-sticky lines. When observed in the wild, the ladders most frequently had around eight loops of silk, though the captive juvenile averaged between 14 and 25 loops, a number seen in the sister species Progradungula carraiensis. Arachnologist William Eberhard noted that unlike other ladder web forming spiders, P. otwayensis added several non-sticky cross bridge threads before laying out the sticky rungs. These were possibly done as an extra measure to stabilize the catching surface more. They then ran a sticky thread mass down one edge and formed a series of zig-zag rungs up the middle area with the side turns doubly attached to the under-treads. The noted plasticity between the wild and captive immature spiders was noted by the authors, who postulated that since cribellate silk is energy expensive, the regular food offerings to the captive spider allowed for more intricate webs while wild specimens maintained conservative webs due to lower food encounters.

== Diet ==
The natural diet of Progradungula barringtonensis is unknown. The juvenile kept by the research team was fed once a week with a single small cricket.

== Etymology ==
Peter Michalik and Helen Smith chose to coin the specific epithet barringtonensis as a toponym reflecting the type locality. Following the naming tradition used for the two other Progradungula species, P. carraiensis and P. otwayensis, the new species was named for the Barrington Tops National Park, New South Wales, where the known populations live.

== Taxonomy ==
The first indication of a new species was the 2007 discovery of a juvenile spiders web constructed in the hollow base of a eucalyptus in Barrington Tops. The research team took a live juvenile on March 3, 2016, and kept it in captivity for observations. The first sighting and capture of an adult happened on November 14, 2019, 12 years after the initial 2007 web discovery, at the same tree. The same day a second immature specimen was also collected and a day later a third immature spider was caught.

The captured male was designated the holotype specimen and accessioned into the Australian Museum collections, Sydney Australia as AMS KS.12599, while the 2016 immature specimen was eventually added to the Museum of Nature Hamburg (Zoology) as MH-A0010454. The immature specimen collected the same day as the holotype was also added to the AM collections as "AMSKS.12599". While the last specimen collected was examined for the type description, it was not deposited into a museum collection. As an additional step, the ZMH-A0010454 juvenile was DNA barcoded via sequencing of the mitochondrial Cytochrome c oxidase subunit I gene. The sequenced genetic material was deposited into the Bethesda, Maryland National Center for Biotechnology Information GenBank collections as sequence OR687334. P. barringtonensis is one of only three described species in the genus Progradungula, the other two being P. carraiensis and P. otwayensis.

== Distribution ==
The full range is not known, but researchers Peter Michalik, Helen M. Smith, Graham Milledge, and Danilo Harms suspect that the species is likely restricted to the Old-growth forests of Barrington Tops, New South Wales. Specifically the higher elevation Nothofagus groves with a sub-alpine climate, regular rainfall, and yearly snow fall events are likely the habitat zone in the national park that the species can exist in. Given the national park is outside the documented range for either of the other two described species Smith and Graham Milledge conducted a series of additional exploratory trips to the park and locating several populations. Some visits they documented much juvenile activity in known habitat tress, other visits missed all spider activity. Extensive investigation of secondary growth Nothofagus and of eucalyptus stands lacking a Nothofagus component showed those areas to be missing P. barringtonensis populations. These researchers also speculate that the genus Progradungula is relictual, being a hold over from before the major climate changes since the Miocene. They suggested the genus to be a "ghost of Gondwana", having suffered through several major extinctions and now lingers in a few sheltered refugia habitats.
