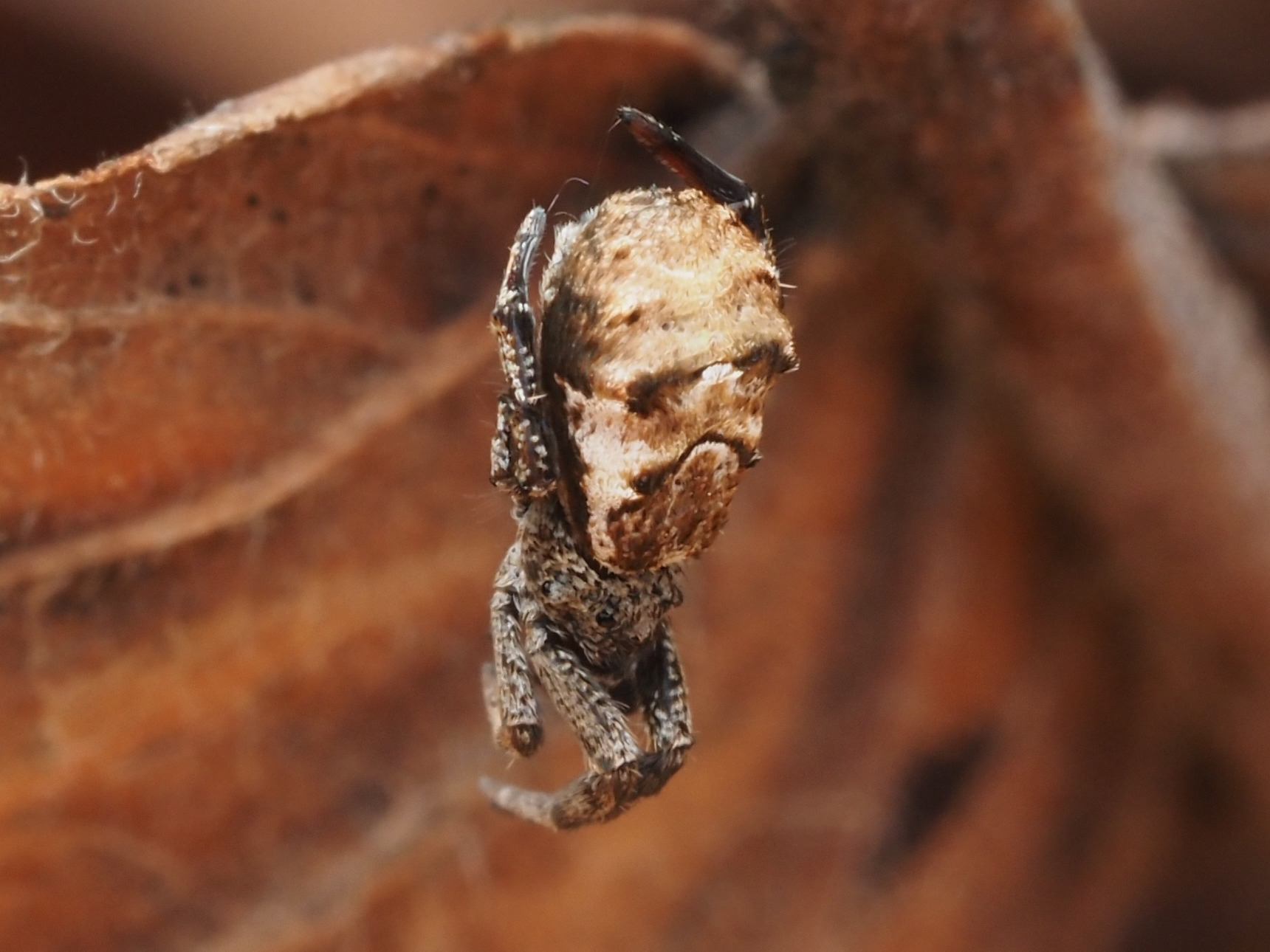
- H. cavatus
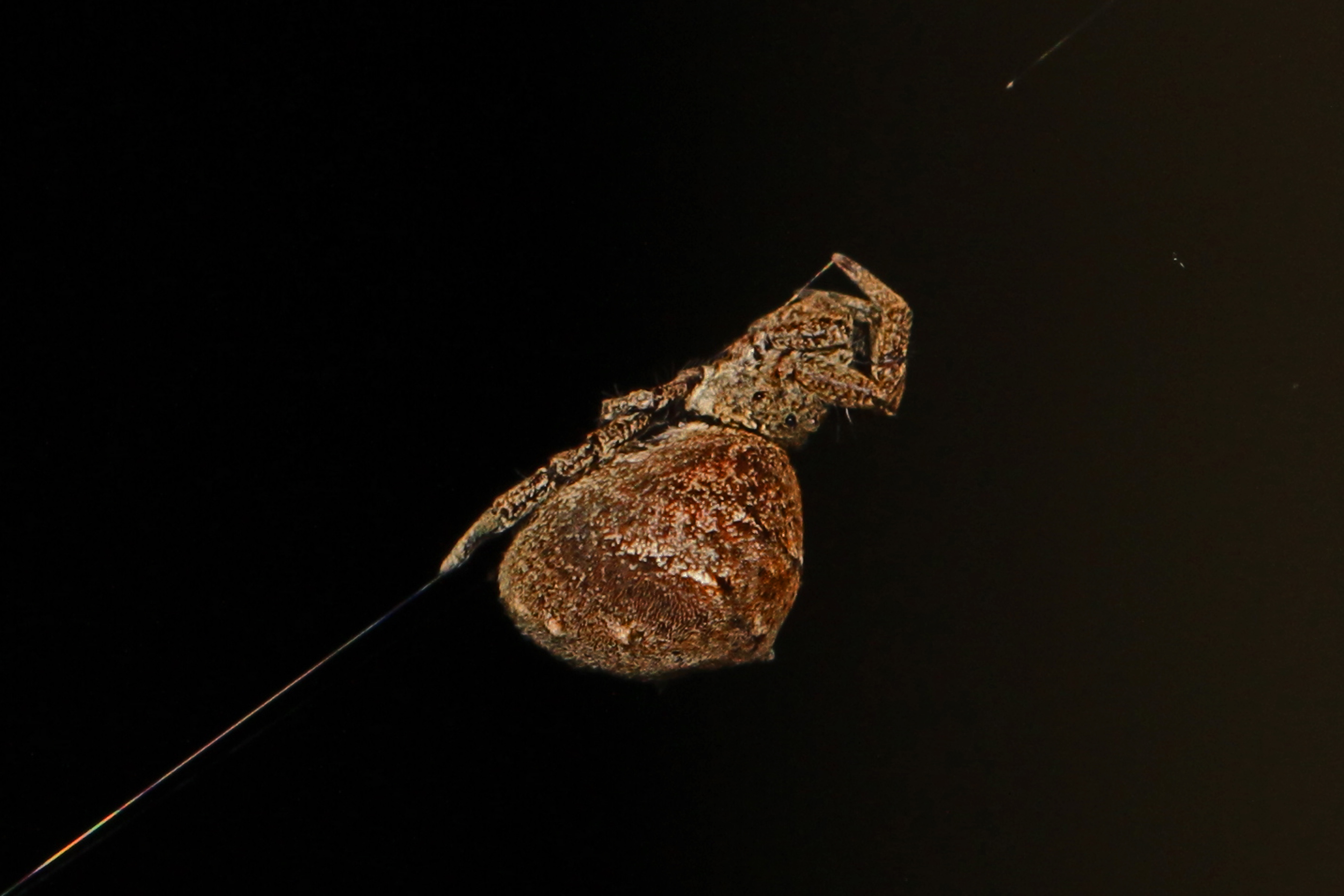
- Female Hyptiotes cavatus from Woodbridge, Virginia

Scientific classification
- Kingdom: Animalia
- Phylum: Arthropoda
- Subphylum: Chelicerata
- Class: Arachnida
- Order: Araneae
- Infraorder: Araneomorphae
- Family: Uloboridae
- Genus: Hyptiotes; Walckenaer, 1837

Diversity
- 17 species, see text

= Hyptiotes =

Hyptiotes Temporal range: Palaeogene–present

Genus of spiders

Hyptiotes is a genus of spiders in the family Uloboridae.

== Life style ==
Hyptiotes spiders produce a rudimentary orb-web consisting only of four radii connected to a single thread which the spider uses to manipulate the web. This triangular web is made between leaves on plants. The spider sits at a vertex until it detects vibrations that signify the collision of its prey. At this moment the spider releases a coil of silk which it has held taut in such a manner that the tension of the web causes it to entangle the prey. The spider then wraps its prey in special wrapping silk.

The egg-sac is flattened, mottled brown in colour and attached to the surface of a twig.

== Description ==
The cephalothorax is as broad as long and weakly convex above, highest and broadest at the second eye row. The carapace is narrowed and rounded in front and widely rounded posteriorly.

The eight eyes are arranged in two unequal, transverse rows. The anterior row is procurved as seen from in front and nearly straight in dorsal view. The median eyes are close together and very small, while the lateral eyes are widely separated from the medians. The much wider posterior eye row is recurved, with large median eyes as widely separated as the anterior lateral eyes. The clypeus is broad and sloping.

The sternum is triangular, considerably longer than wide, truncated and widest in front, quite evenly tapering behind to a blunt point between slightly separated posterior coxae.

The abdomen of females is sub-oval and moderately to strongly arched, while the abdomen of males is more slender. The anterior spinnerets are much larger than the posterior pair.

The legs are short and stout. Legs of females are without spines except for a few on the ventral surface of the metatarsi. Legs of males are longer with dorsal and lateral spines. The calamistrum occupies most of the length of the flattened fourth metatarsus and consists of a single series of curved bristles.

== Species ==
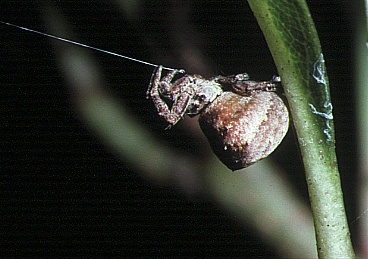
H. affinis

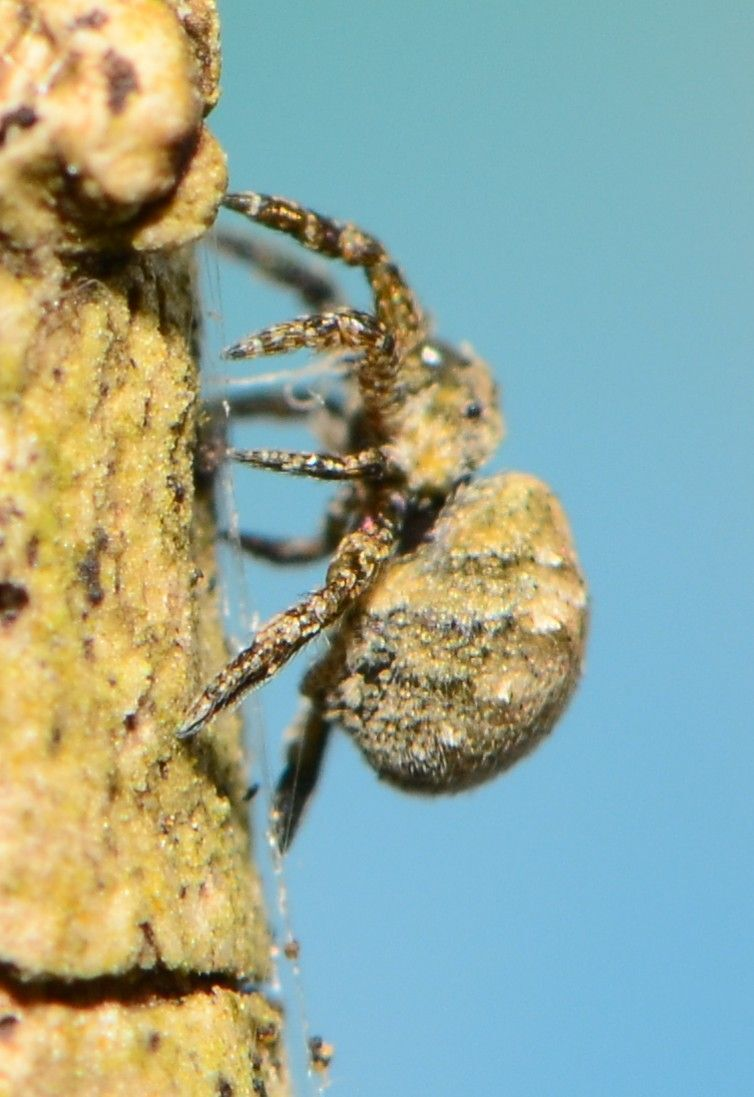
H. akermani

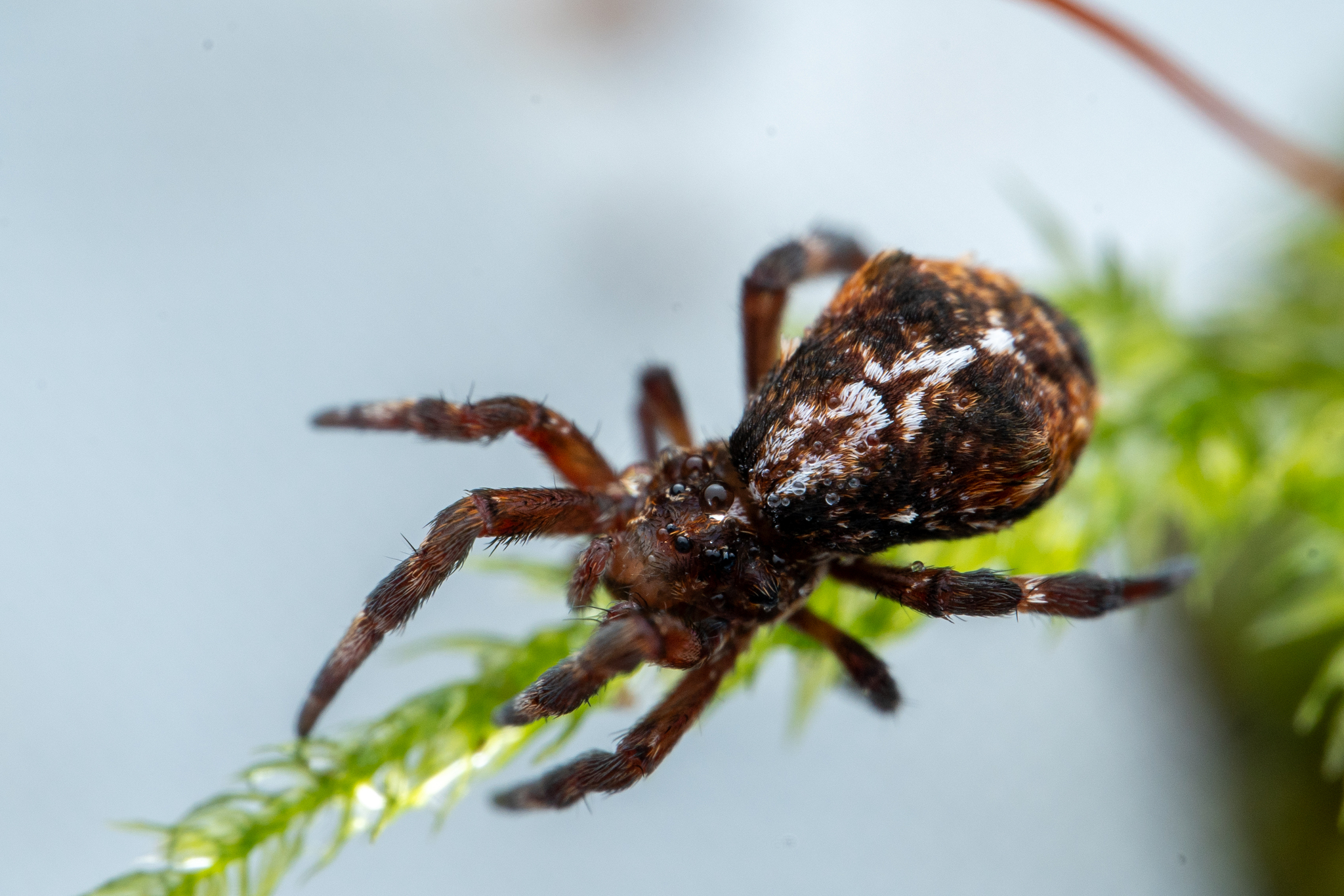
H. gertschi

As of October 2025, this genus includes seventeen species:

- Hyptiotes affinis Bösenberg & Strand, 1906 – India, China, Korea, Taiwan, Japan
- Hyptiotes akermani Wiehle, 1964 – South Africa
- Hyptiotes analis Simon, 1892 – Sri Lanka
- Hyptiotes cavatus (Hentz, 1847) – Canada, United States
- Hyptiotes dentatus Wunderlich, 2008 – France
- Hyptiotes fabaceus Dong, Zhu & Yoshida, 2005 – China
- Hyptiotes flavidus (Blackwall, 1862) – Madeira, Mediterranean, Russia (Europe), Caucasus
- Hyptiotes gerhardti Wiehle, 1929 – Greece, Caucasus (Russia, Georgia)
- Hyptiotes gertschi Chamberlin & Ivie, 1935 – Alaska, Canada, United States
- Hyptiotes himalayensis Tikader, 1981 – India
- Hyptiotes indicus Simon, 1905 – India
- Hyptiotes nonggang Huang, Yin, Cai & Xu, 2023 – China
- Hyptiotes paradoxus (C. L. Koch, 1834) – Europe, Algeria, Tunisia, Turkey, Caucasus, China (type species)
- Hyptiotes puebla Muma & Gertsch, 1964 – United States, Mexico
- Hyptiotes solanus Dong, Zhu & Yoshida, 2005 – China
- Hyptiotes tehama Muma & Gertsch, 1964 – United States
- Hyptiotes xinlongensis Liu, Wang & Peng, 1991 – China
