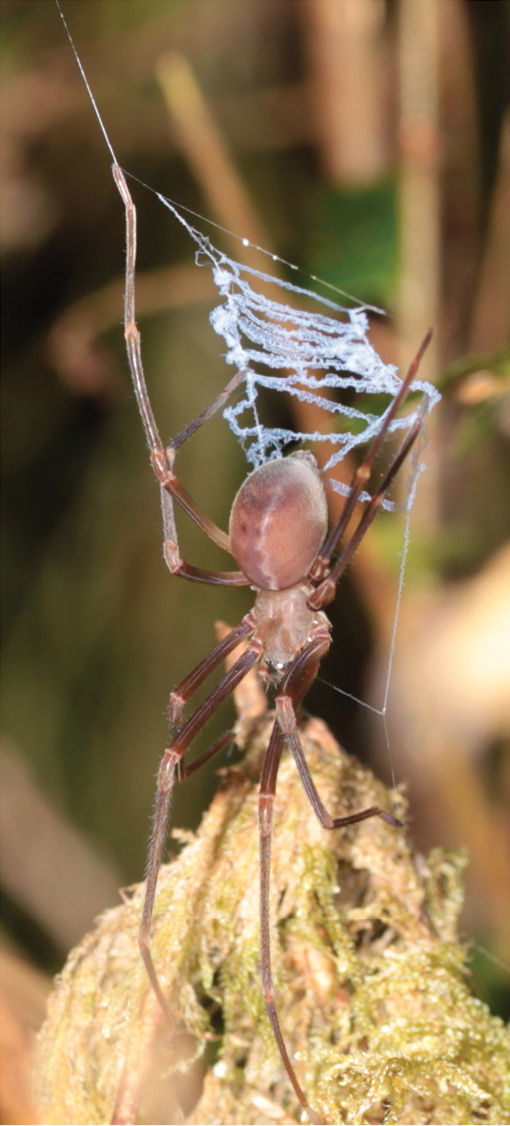
- P. otwayensis immature male shown holding its catching ladder and assuming a hunting posture

Scientific classification
- Kingdom: Animalia
- Phylum: Arthropoda
- Subphylum: Chelicerata
- Class: Arachnida
- Order: Araneae
- Infraorder: Araneomorphae
- Family: Gradungulidae
- Genus: Progradungula
- Species: P. otwayensis

Binomial name
- Progradungula otwayensis Milledge, 1997
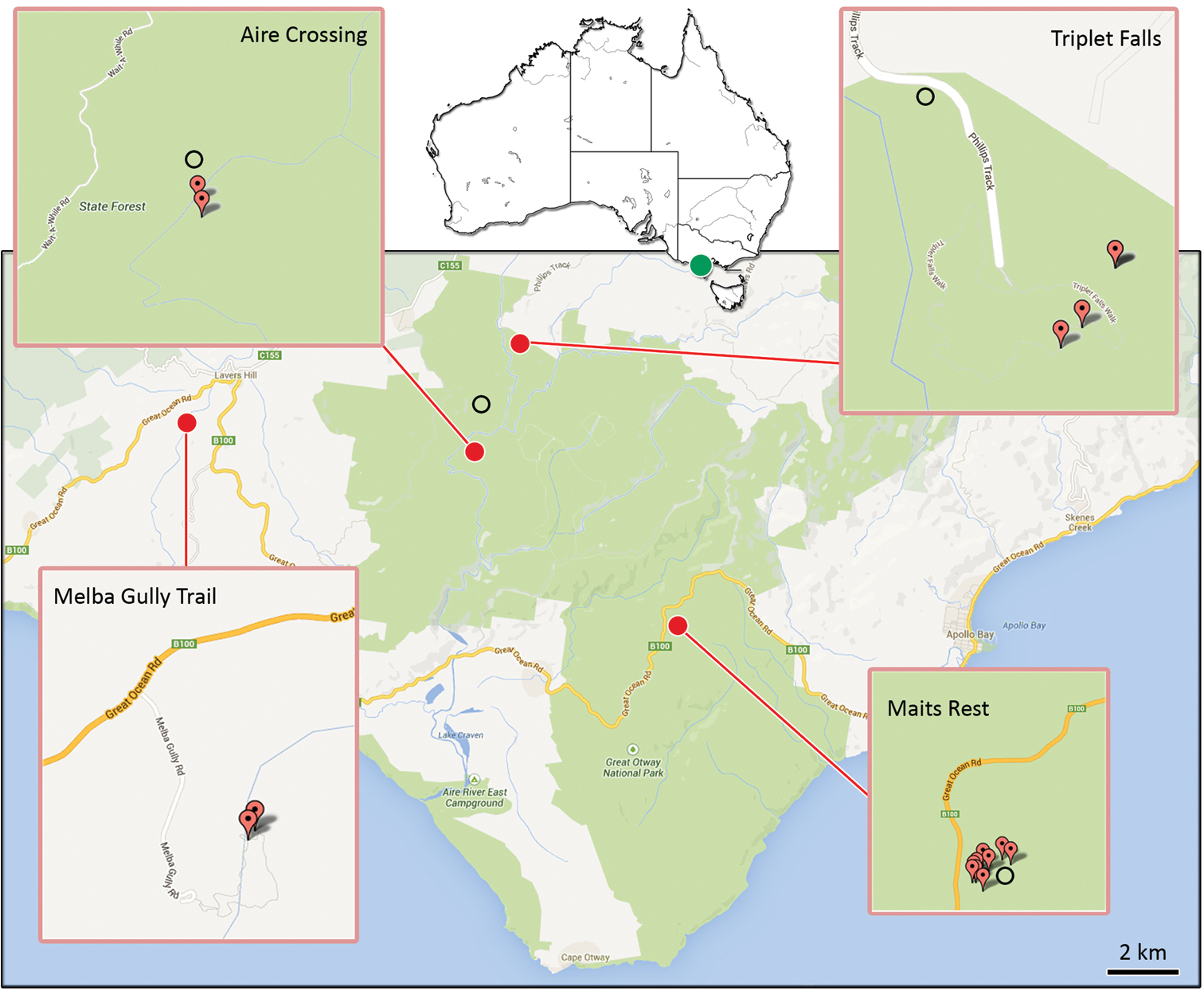
- Distribution map of P. otwayensis in the Great Otway National Park of Victoria, Australia. Red marks indicate localities for Michalik et al. (2013); black circles indicate localities given by Milledge (1997).

= Progradungula otwayensis =

Species of spider

Progradungula otwayensis, commonly known as the Otway odd-clawed spider, is a species of cribellate spider endemic to the Great Otway National Park of Victoria, Australia. It is one of only three species in the gradungulid genus Progradungula.

Odd-clawed spiders are medium-sized to large spiders, with an approximate body length of 10 to 15 mm (0.39 to 0.59 in) and a leg span of 72 to 77 mm (2.8 to 3.0 in). They are lightly pigmented, from yellowish brown to light mauvish gray, with three chevron markings on the rear upper part of their abdomen. Like other gradungulids, their legs are tipped with three claws. These claws are particularly well-developed on the first and second leg pairs and are used for latching unto prey. They are ambush predators, building characteristic ladder-shaped snares close to the ground. They stand head-down on these webs waiting for prey which they then scoop up into these webs to trap them.

== Taxonomy ==
Odd-clawed spiders were first described by the Australian arachnologist Graham A. Milledge in 1997. They are named after the Great Otway National Park, from where the type specimens were recovered. Milledge's specimens comprised only one adult male and several juveniles. The female was unknown until 2013 when the arachnologists Peter Michalik, Luis Piacentini, Elisabeth Lipke, and Martin J. Ramírez described an adult female for the first time.

Progradungula otwayensis is one of only two species classified under the genus Progradungula. The other species being the very similar Carrai cave spider (Progradungula carraiensis). They can be distinguished from the latter by the presence of a single jutting structure (process) on the syringe-like copulatory organ (embolus) of the bulb on the male pedipalps, in contrast to two in Carrai cave spiders. Female odd-clawed spiders also have eight sperm receptacles (spermathecae) on their genitals (epigyne), in contrast to six in the Carrai cave spiders.

Progradungula otwayensis belongs to the family Gradungulidae, superfamily Austrochiloidea, and suborder Araneomorphae.

== Description ==
The carapace (upper part of the cephalothorax) of females is 6.92 mm (0.272 in) and 4.66 mm (0.183 in) wide. It is widest between the second and third leg pairs. The sternum (lower part of the cephalothorax) is elongated and shield-shaped with a pointed tip at the rear ending at the midpoint of the fourth leg pair. The abdomen (opisthosoma) is 8.51 mm (0.335 in) long and 7.18 mm (0.283 in) wide. The first pair of legs is the longest at 40.30 mm (1.587 in), while the third pair is the shortest at 27.14 mm (1.069 in). The second and fourth pair of legs are around the same lengths, at 30.86 mm (1.215 in) and 32.46 mm (1.278 in) respectively.

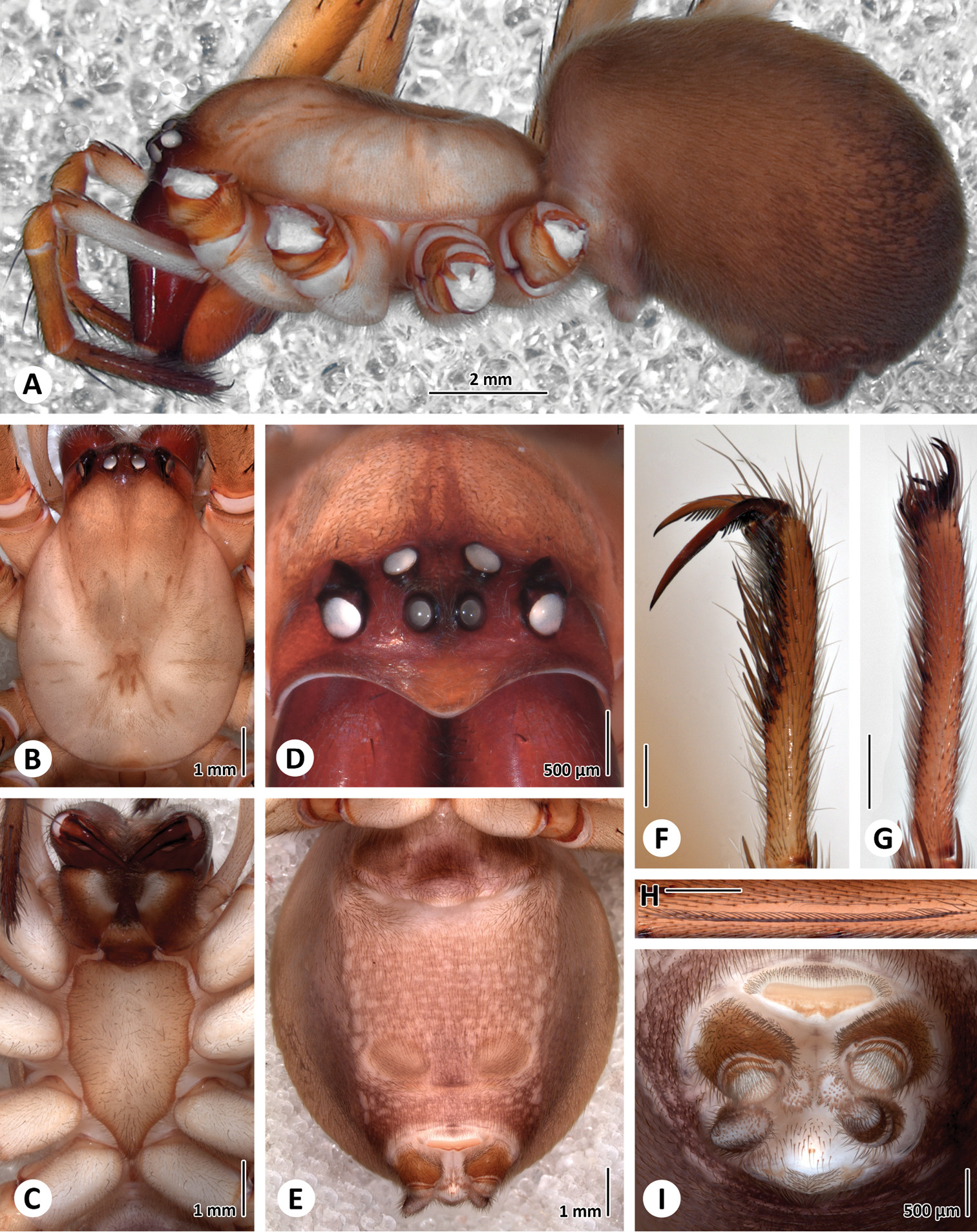
P. otwayensis female: A Side view of cephalothorax and abdomen; B Carapace; C Sternum; D Frontal view of eyes; E Ventral view of abdomen; F Tarsus of first leg pair with claws; G Tarsus of fourth leg pair; H Calamistrum; I Ventral view of spinnerets. Scale bar in F–H is 500 μm.

The males are smaller than the females, with a carapace about 5.42 mm (0.213 in) long and 3.98 mm (0.157 in) wide. The abdomen is relatively shorter than the carapace unlike in the females. It is about 5.40 mm (0.213 in) long and 3.98 mm (0.157 in) wide. As with the females, the first pair of legs is the longest at 37.89 mm (1.492 in), and the third pair the shortest at 24.89 mm (0.980 in). The second and fourth leg pairs are both around 30 mm (1.2 in) in length.

The last segments of the legs (tarsi) in both males and females have three claws on the tips. Longest on the first two pairs of legs, and shorter on the rest. The hook-like and raptorial upper two claws (the superior claws) on the ends of the first two leg pairs are dissimilar from each other. They are complemented by dense forward facing bristles (setae) on the underside of the tarsus, which are particularly strongly developed on the first and second leg pair. The legs also possess a slightly asymmetrical pattern of spines. A short row of fine comb-like bristles (the calamistrum) is found on the second quarter of the second-to-the-last leg segments (metatarsi) of the fourth leg pair.

Odd-clawed spiders have eight eyes arranged in two rows of four. The front row curves slightly backward, while the back row curves slightly forward. The anterior and posterior lateral (left and right) eyes are clustered closely together, while the median eyes are spaced further from each other. In females, the anterior and posterior lateral eyes are the largest pairs, with a diameter of 0.35 mm (0.014 in). The anterior median eyes are the smallest with a diameter of 0.23 mm (0.0091 in). The posterior median eyes are slightly smaller than the lateral eyes, at a diameter of 0.32 mm (0.013 in). In males, the anterior lateral eyes are the largest pair, with a diameter of 0.29 mm (0.011 in). Their posterior median eyes and posterior lateral eyes are about the same size, with a diameter of 0.25 mm (0.0098 in). As with the female, the anterior median eyes are the smallest pair, with a diameter of only 0.15 mm (0.0059 in). All of the eyes are white in colour, except for the anterior median eyes which are black.

The fang appendages (chelicerae) are strong and vertically oriented. They possess large forward facing teeth on the cheliceral groove, three in females and four in males, evenly spaced from each other. Very small backward facing teeth (denticles) are also present in a row on the basal half of the cheliceral groove, five in females and three to four in males. A spine is present on the upper side of the tip. Sound-producing ridges on the chelicerae (stridulatory organs) are absent in females but present in males. The chewing appendages (maxillae) are located immediately behind the chelicerae. They are strongly curved on the outside edges and tapers into a blunt tip. They possess serrated edges (serrulae) used to cut up prey. The lower lip (labium) which covers the mouth opening has an indentation at the tip. It is 0.83 mm (0.033 in) long and 0.87 mm (0.034 in) wide in females. In males, it is 0.69 mm (0.027 in) long and 0.85 mm (0.033 in) wide.

In life, odd-clawed spiders have a yellowish brown carapace, darker around the eye regions. The mouthparts are reddish brown. The sternum is reddish brown at the sides, paler in the middle. The legs are also yellowish brown. The abdomen is fawn coloured in females with three dark-brown chevron shaped markings on the rear half. In males, the abdomen is a light mauvish grey, with a pale stripe in the middle of the upper surface of the front half. In the rear half, they have three paler chevron shaped markings.

== Distribution and habitat ==
Odd-clawed spiders are endemic to the Great Otway National Park of Victoria, Australia. They seem to prefer to build their webs near or in the hollows of myrtle beech (Nothofagus cunninghamii), particularly in very old trees which usually have extensive hollows. Webs have also been found near hollows in mountain ash (Eucalyptus regnans), the bases of tree ferns (Cyatheales), and even under bridges. Though in areas where old myrtle trees are abundant, these other habitats are much less inhabited. This may indicate that they are dependent on the microclimate of the myrtle beech hollows.

== Behaviour ==
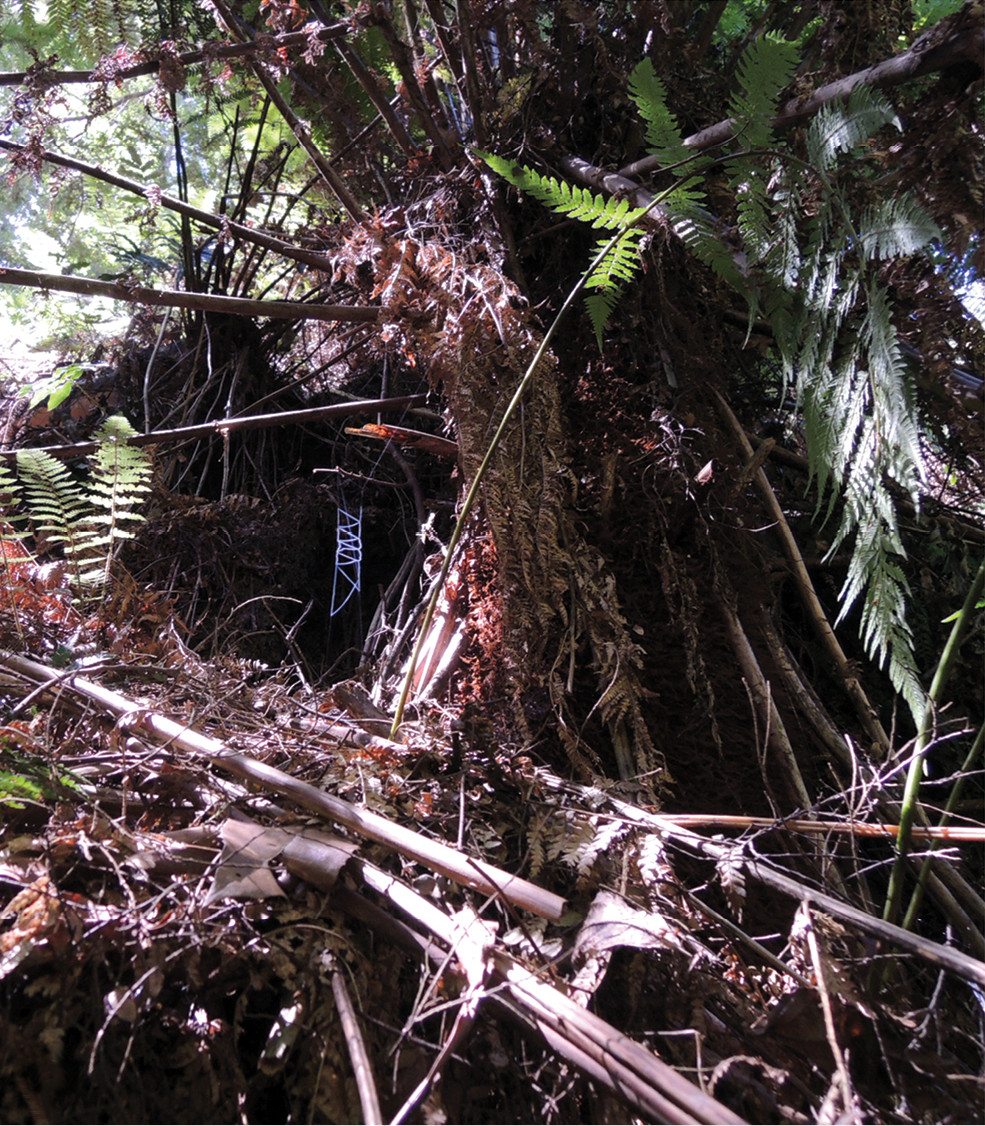
Catching ladder of P. otwayensis in the hollow of a large tree fern

Odd-clawed spiders are nocturnal. During the day, they rest inside their retreats in the tree hollows. An hour or so after sunset, they emerge to build their webs or to hunt.

Along with Progradungula carraiensis and Macrogradungula moonya, odd-clawed spiders are one of the only three species belonging to the family Gradungulidae that are cribellate. Unlike other members of the family which are all cursorial (active roving hunters), these three species are ambush predators that construct snares. The snares are made from silk spun from specialized spinnerets known as the cribellum, and combed with the row of bristles (the calamistrum) on their fourth leg pair. Unlike normal spinnerets, the cribellum produces extremely fine silk that can easily entangle prey without the need for glue. The snares of all three species are distinctively ladder-shaped, in contrast to the snares of other cribellate spiders from other families.

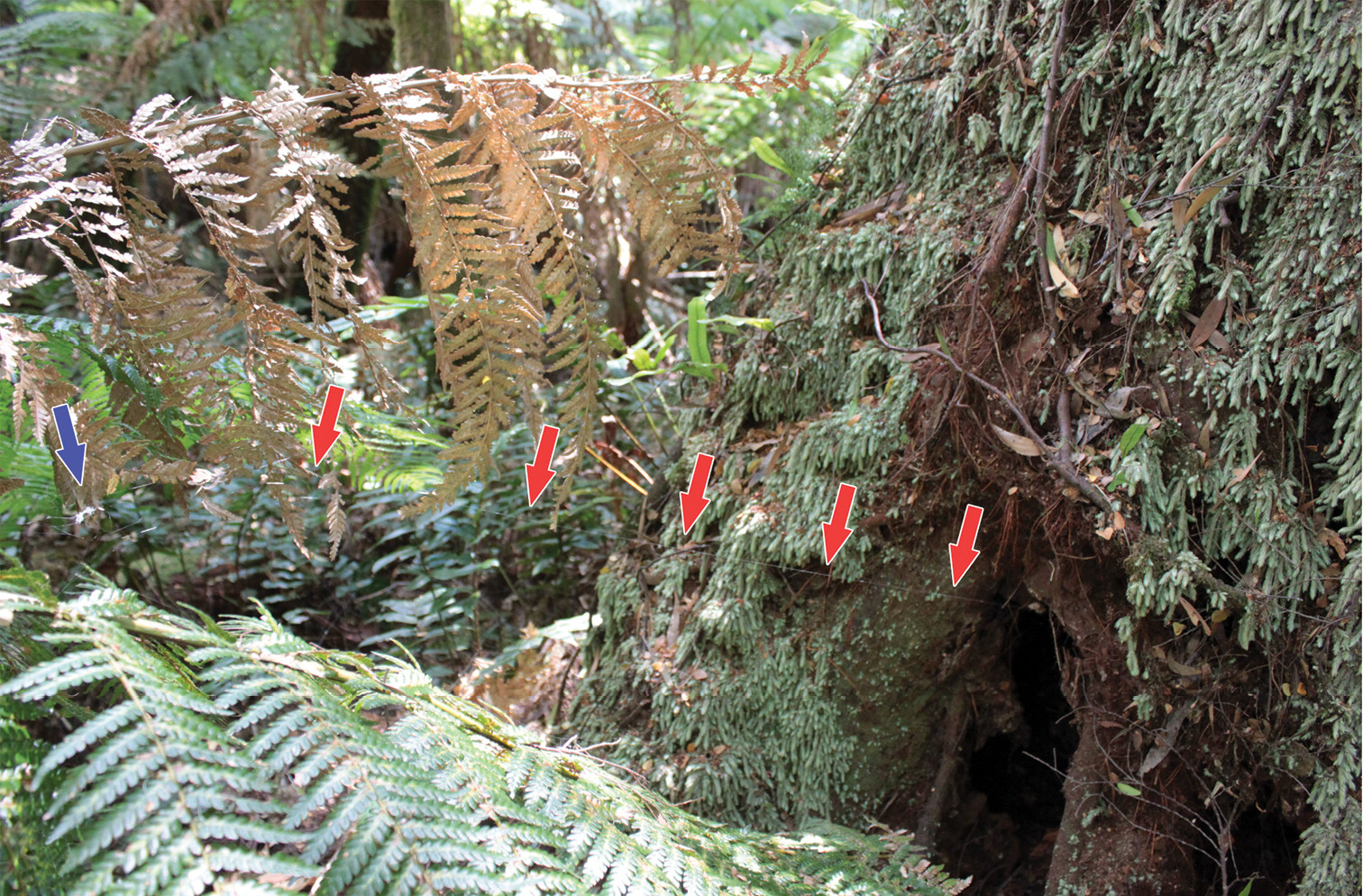
The support web (blue arrow) of P. otwayensis shown connected by a single sturdy line (red arrows) to a hollow in a myrtle beech tree.

The larger part of the odd-clawed spider's web is composed of a network of supporting threads built up to 2 m (6.6 ft) above the ground. Two lateral support threads extend from this network and are attached to vegetation or ground below. These threads are held more or less parallel to each other by several short bridge threads. The spider spins the catching ladder in between them, composed of a loose irregular zigzag of cribellate thread. The catching ladder and the supporting webs are usually built far from the retreat of the spider in the tree hollows, as far as 3 m (9.8 ft) away. The retreat and the webs are connected to each other by a single sturdy thread.

The prey-catching behaviour of odd-clawed spiders is similar to that of Progradungula carraiensis and Macrogradungula moonya. The spider takes position on its catching ladder with its head facing downwards toward the substrate. In this position, its fangs are at about the same level as the lowest "rung" of the catching ladder. The third and fourth pair of legs are used to stretch and hold the catching ladder behind the spider. The first and second pair of legs are held outstretched in front of the spider, just above the ground level. The second pair of legs may touch, or at least is very close to, the lateral support threads. Through these threads, the spider senses vibrations coming from the ground. These vibrations (in addition to air currents) warn the spider of approaching prey.

When a prey animal is detected within the range of the spider, it lunges with its clawed front legs and scoops it up into the catching ladder, also administering a bite in the process. The catching ladder detaches from the lateral support threads and entangles the prey. Due to its elasticity, the cribellate threads can stretch to comfortably envelop even large prey. The spider restrains the enmeshed prey while continuing to inject it with venom. When the prey stops moving, the spider relaxes its hold, turns around on the web and begins wrapping the prey in silk. The catching ladder is destroyed during the capture and the spider may rebuild it during or even before feeding on the caught prey.

Odd-clawed spiders also have similar defensive behaviour as Progradungula carraiensis. During low-level disturbances, they retreat towards the upper support webs or dismount towards the nearest surface. In greater threat levels, however, they immediately drop from their webs to the ground and "play dead" (thanatosis), assuming an inert posture with their legs tightly held against their bodies.

In contrast to adults and immature individuals, all the juveniles were observed to build their catching ladders and support webs inside the tree hollows. No catching ladders of juveniles have been found in the open. This seems to indicate that early instars of odd-clawed spiders live exclusively within the tree hollows.

== Conservation ==
Due to their apparent dependence on myrtle beech trees (which explains their extremely limited distribution range), their survival is closely tied to the preservation of habitats where myrtle beech also occurs.
