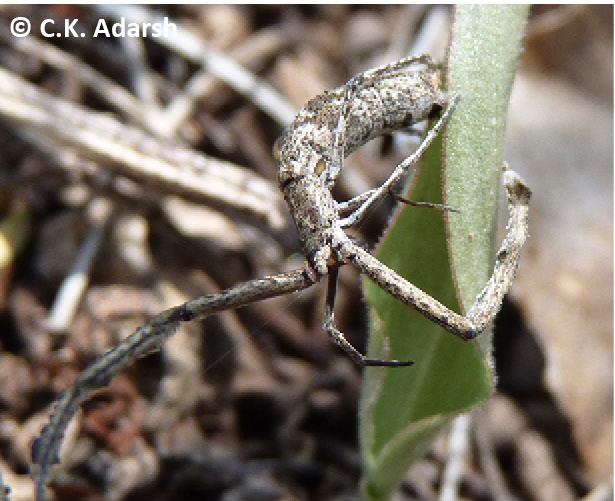
- M. extensus
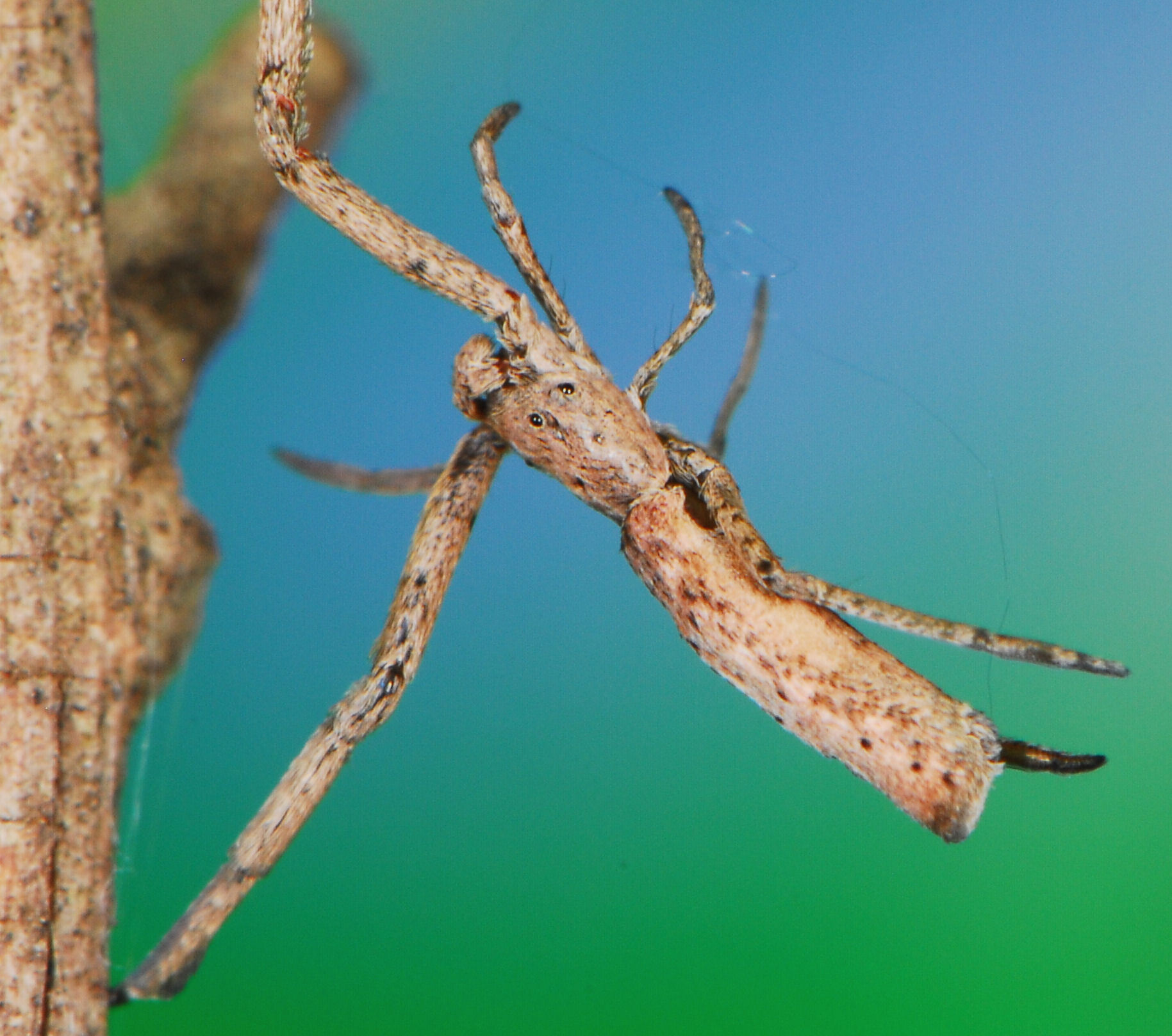
- M. brevicaudus

Scientific classification
- Kingdom: Animalia
- Phylum: Arthropoda
- Subphylum: Chelicerata
- Class: Arachnida
- Order: Araneae
- Infraorder: Araneomorphae
- Family: Uloboridae
- Genus: Miagrammopes; O. Pickard-Cambridge, 1870

Type species
- M. thwaitesi O. Pickard-Cambridge, 1870

Species
- 71, see text

Synonyms
- Huanacauria; Miagrammopsidis; Mumaia; Ranguma

= Miagrammopes =

Miagrammopes Temporal range: Palaeogene–present

Genus of spiders

Miagrammopes is a genus of cribellate orb weavers first described by Octavius Pickard-Cambridge in 1870. These spiders have a unique shape and only four of their original eight eyes. They spin a single line of web, actively watching and jerking the line to catch their prey.

== Life style ==
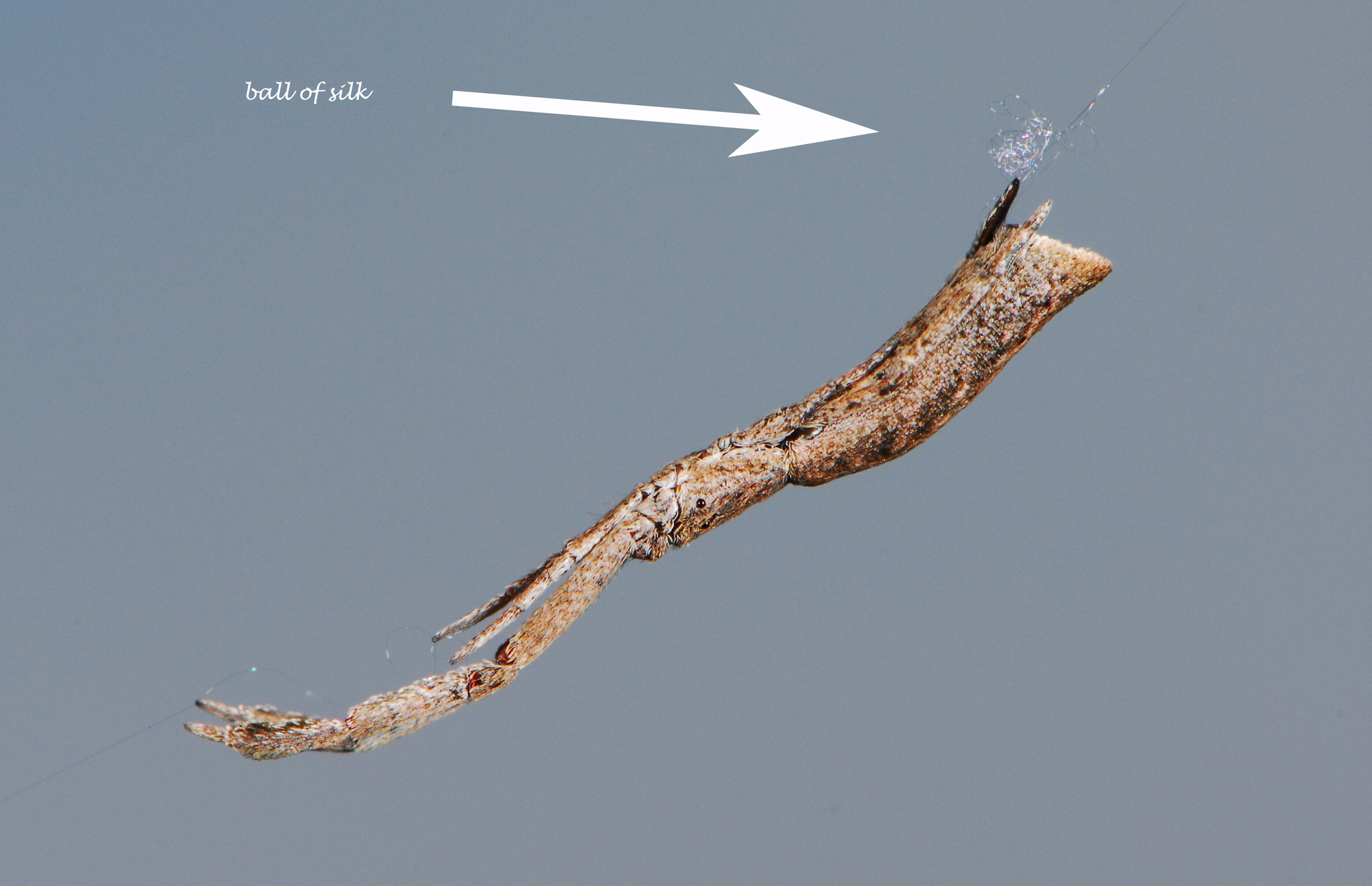
M. brevicaudatus, showing ball of silk

Miagrammopes species construct a horizontal, usually single thread between two branches or twigs. The spider lays down a thick band of viscid silk and then takes up a position upside down near a point of attachment, with only the central section consisting of cribellate silk. The thread has one or a few sticky capture threads attached to it that are held under tension. The line is kept under tension and released with a snap when prey alights on the inviting line and becomes entangled.

The attack behaviour involves rapid jerking and sudden sagging of the capture thread. In some tropical species such as Miagrammopes brevicaudus, the web consists of three threads. The spider positions itself at the end of one of the upper threads and only approaches the mid-section in darkness.

The female carries the cylindrical egg-sac until the spiderlings emerge.

== Description ==
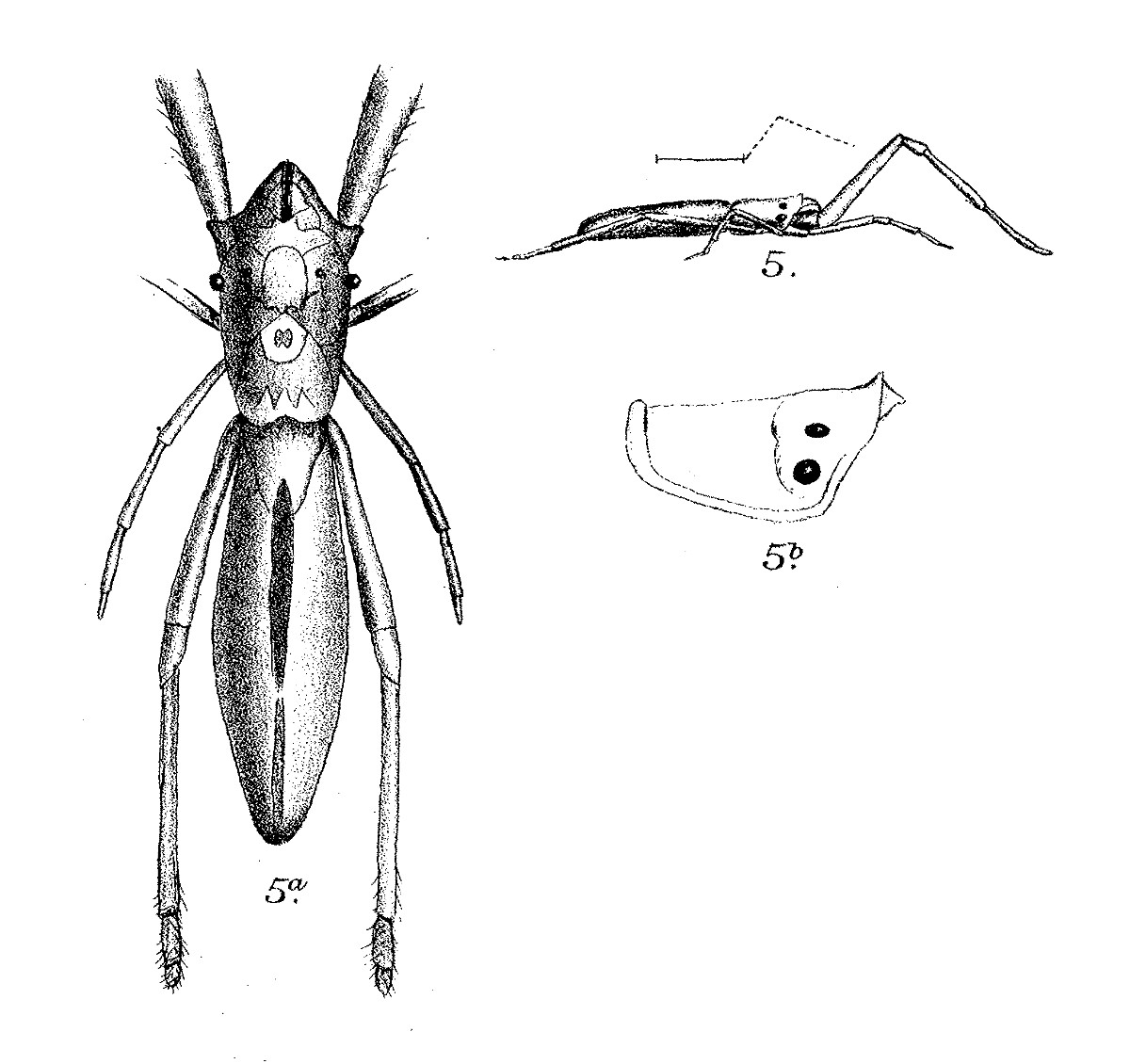
M. gulliveri

The carapace is longer than wide, low, and weakly convex above. The cephalic region is broad and obtusely rounded in front. The thoracic region has nearly subparallel sides and is truncated behind.

The eyes are unequal in size and arranged in two unequal transverse rows. The eyes of the front row are minute or obsolete, with evidence of anterior median eyes seen in small, dark pigment spots in some specimens. The posterior row is recurved with median eyes widely separated. The clypeus is broad and sloping, equal in width to two or more diameters of the posterior median eye.

The sternum is elongated and divided into two unequal sternites seemingly joined to the carapace between second and third coxae by narrow sclerites. The abdomen is elongated, often tubular. The calamistrum is a broad lobe with the spinning field entire.

The leg formula is 1423. The legs are quite long and unequal, with the second and third pairs short and thin. The fourth pair is long and laterally compressed, while the first pair is stoutest and longest with apical segments laterally compressed. The trochanters of the first and fourth legs are strongly developed, exceeding the coxae in length. The metatarsus IV is laterally compressed with a ventral comb of short spines. The calamistrum occupies most of the length of the compressed fourth metatarsus and consists of a single, sinuous series of curved bristles set on a thin keel on the dorsal surface of the segment. The front tibiae of males often have rows of stout spines.

== Species ==
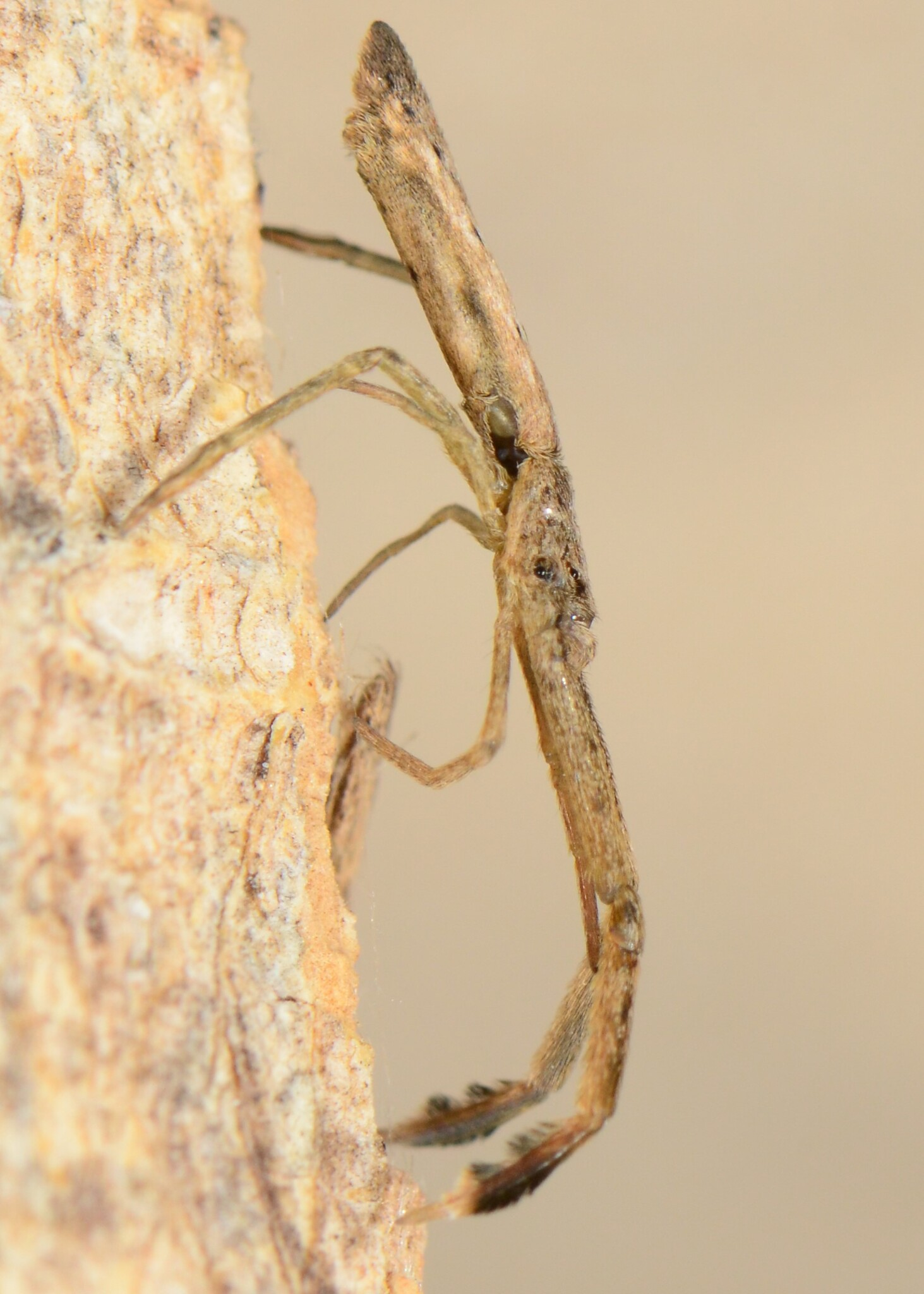
M. constrictus

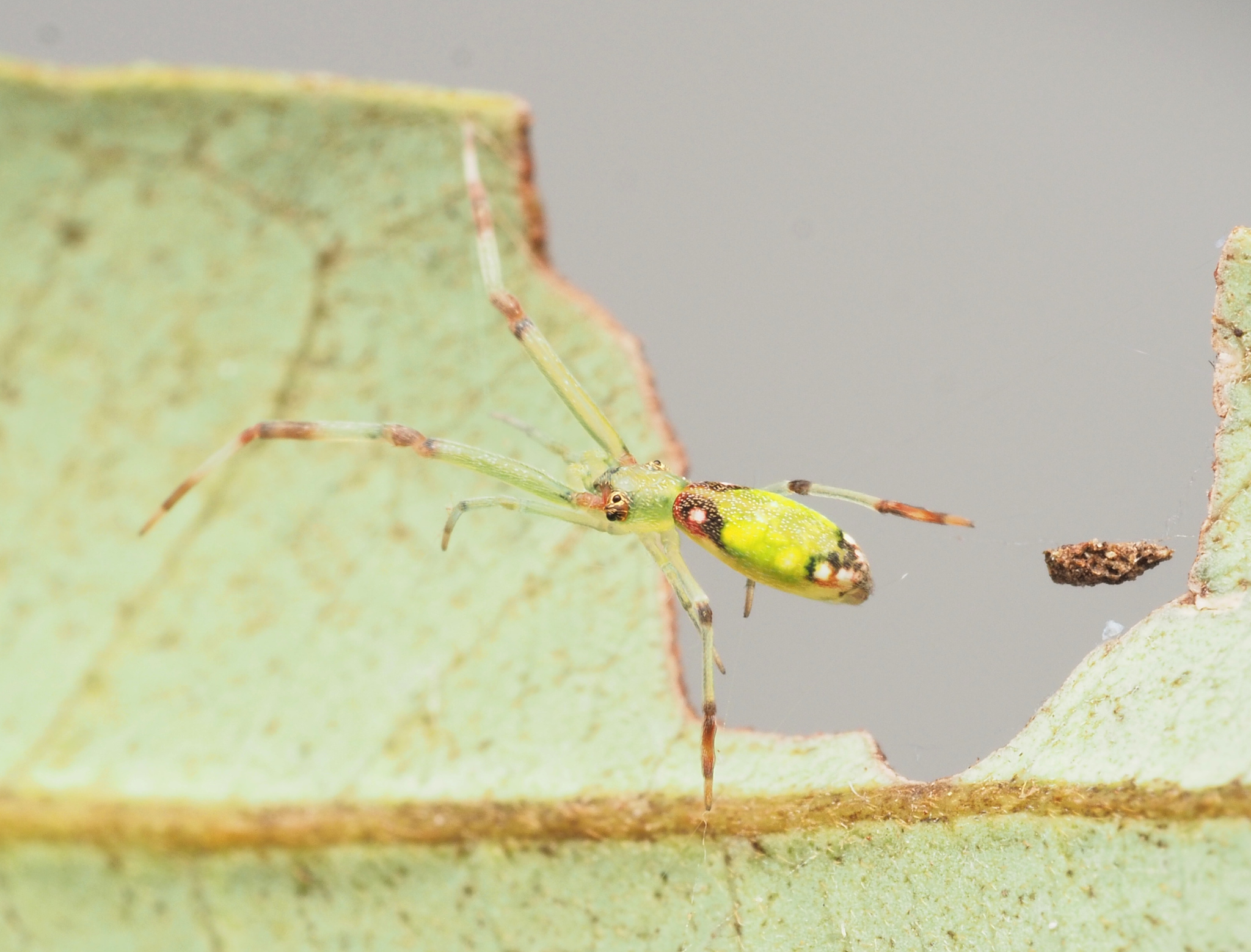
M. flavus

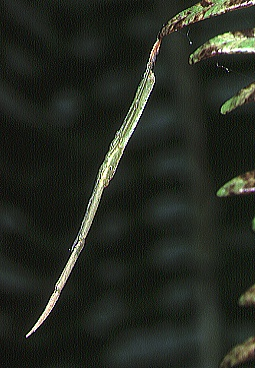
M oblongus

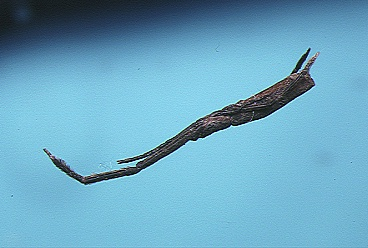
M. orientalis

As of October 2025, this genus includes 71 species:

- Miagrammopes albocinctus Simon, 1893 – Venezuela
- Miagrammopes alboguttatus F. O. Pickard-Cambridge, 1902 – Guatemala to Panama
- Miagrammopes albomaculatus Thorell, 1891 – India (Nicobar Is.)
- Miagrammopes animotus Chickering, 1968 – Puerto Rico
- Miagrammopes apostrophus Sen, Saha & Raychaudhuri, 2013 – India
- Miagrammopes aspinatus Chickering, 1968 – Panama
- Miagrammopes auriculatus Cai & Xu, 2021 – China
- Miagrammopes auriventer Schenkel, 1953 – Venezuela
- Miagrammopes bambusicola Simon, 1893 – Venezuela
- Miagrammopes bifurcatus Dong, Yan, Zhu & Song, 2004 – China
- Miagrammopes birabeni Mello-Leitão, 1945 – Argentina
- Miagrammopes biroi Kulczyński, 1908 – Papua New Guinea
- Miagrammopes bradleyi O. Pickard-Cambridge, 1874 – Australia (New South Wales)
- Miagrammopes brasiliensis Roewer, 1951 – Brazil
- Miagrammopes brevicaudus O. Pickard-Cambridge, 1882 – South Africa, Eswatini
- Miagrammopes brevior Kulczyński, 1908 – Papua New Guinea
- Miagrammopes brooksptensis Barrion & Litsinger, 1995 – Philippines
- Miagrammopes cambridgei Thorell, 1887 – Myanmar, Indonesia (Sumatra)
- Miagrammopes caudatus Keyserling, 1890 – Australia (Queensland)
- Miagrammopes ciliatus Petrunkevitch, 1926 – Puerto Rico, St. Vincent
- Miagrammopes constrictus Purcell, 1904 – South Africa
- Miagrammopes corticeus Simon, 1893 – Venezuela
- Miagrammopes cubanus Banks, 1909 – Cuba
- Miagrammopes extensus Simon, 1889 – India
- Miagrammopes fasciatus Rainbow, 1916 – Australia (Queensland)
- Miagrammopes ferdinandi O. Pickard-Cambridge, 1870 – Sri Lanka
- Miagrammopes flavus (Wunderlich, 1976) – Australia (Queensland)
- Miagrammopes gravelyi Tikader, 1971 – India
- Miagrammopes grodnitskyi Logunov, 2018 – Vietnam
- Miagrammopes gulliveri Butler, 1876 – Mauritius (Rodriguez)
- Miagrammopes guttatus Mello-Leitão, 1937 – Brazil, Argentina
- Miagrammopes indicus Tikader, 1971 – India
- Miagrammopes intempus Chickering, 1968 – Panama
- Miagrammopes kinabalu Logunov, 2018 – Malaysia (Borneo)
- Miagrammopes kirkeensis Tikader, 1971 – India
- Miagrammopes larundus Chickering, 1968 – Panama
- Miagrammopes latens Bryant, 1936 – Cuba, Hispaniola
- Miagrammopes lehtineni (Wunderlich, 1976) – Australia (Queensland)
- Miagrammopes licinus Chickering, 1968 – Panama
- Miagrammopes longicauda O. Pickard-Cambridge, 1882 – South Africa
- Miagrammopes luederwaldti Mello-Leitão, 1925 – Brazil
- Miagrammopes maigsieus Barrion & Litsinger, 1995 – Philippines
- Miagrammopes mexicanus O. Pickard-Cambridge, 1893 – United States, Mexico
- Miagrammopes molitus Chickering, 1968 – Jamaica
- Miagrammopes oblongus Yoshida, 1982 – Taiwan, Japan
- Miagrammopes oblucus Chickering, 1968 – Jamaica
- Miagrammopes orientalis Bösenberg & Strand, 1906 – China, Korea, Taiwan, Japan
- Miagrammopes paraorientalis Dong, Zhu & Yoshida, 2005 – China
- Miagrammopes pinopus Chickering, 1968 – Virgin Is.
- Miagrammopes plumipes Kulczyński, 1911 – Indonesia (New Guinea)
- Miagrammopes poonaensis Tikader, 1971 – India
- Miagrammopes raffrayi Simon, 1881 – Tanzania (Zanzibar)
- Miagrammopes rimosus Simon, 1886 – Thailand, Vietnam
- Miagrammopes romitii Caporiacco, 1947 – Guyana
- Miagrammopes rubripes Mello-Leitão, 1949 – Brazil
- Miagrammopes rutundus Liang & Xu, 2021 – China
- Miagrammopes satpudaensis Rajoria, 2015 – India
- Miagrammopes scoparius Simon, 1892 – St. Vincent
- Miagrammopes sexpunctatus Simon, 1906 – India
- Miagrammopes similis Kulczyński, 1908 – Papua New Guinea
- Miagrammopes simus Chamberlin & Ivie, 1936 – Panama
- Miagrammopes singaporensis Kulczyński, 1908 – Singapore
- Miagrammopes spatulatus Dong, Yan, Zhu & Song, 2004 – China
- Miagrammopes sutherlandi Tikader, 1971 – India
- Miagrammopes thwaitesi O. Pickard-Cambridge, 1870 – India, Sri Lanka (type species)
- Miagrammopes tonatus Chickering, 1968 – Jamaica
- Miagrammopes trailli O. Pickard-Cambridge, 1882 – Brazil
- Miagrammopes uludusun Logunov, 2018 – Malaysia (Borneo)
- Miagrammopes unguliformis Dong, Yan, Zhu & Song, 2004 – China
- Miagrammopes unipus Chickering, 1968 – Panama
- Miagrammopes viridiventris Strand, 1911 – Indonesia (Kei Is.)
