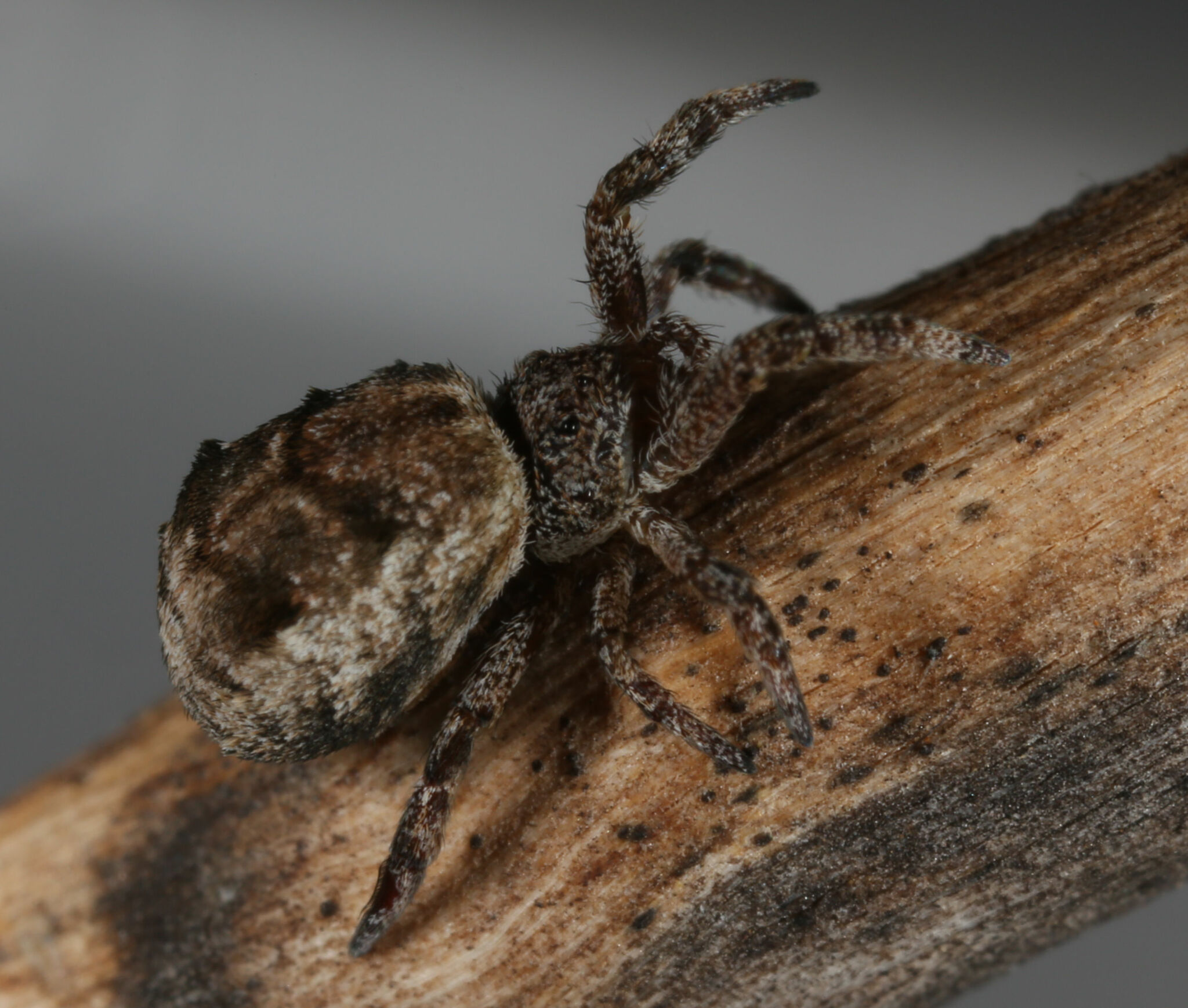

Scientific classification
- Kingdom: Animalia
- Phylum: Arthropoda
- Subphylum: Chelicerata
- Class: Arachnida
- Order: Araneae
- Infraorder: Araneomorphae
- Family: Uloboridae
- Genus: Hyptiotes
- Species: H. puebla

Binomial name
- Hyptiotes puebla Muma & Gertsch, 1964

= Hyptiotes puebla =

Species of spider

Hyptiotes puebla is a species of cribellate orb weaver in the spider family Uloboridae. It is found in the United States and Mexico.
