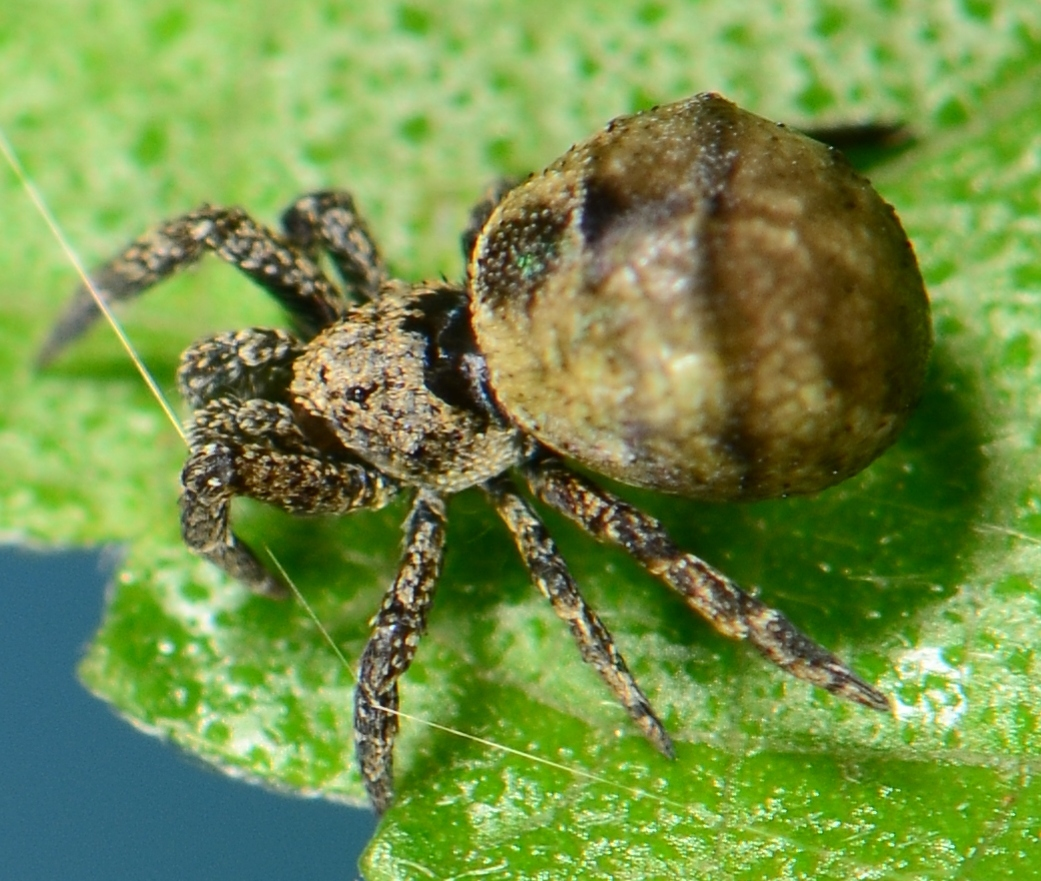
- Juvenile female
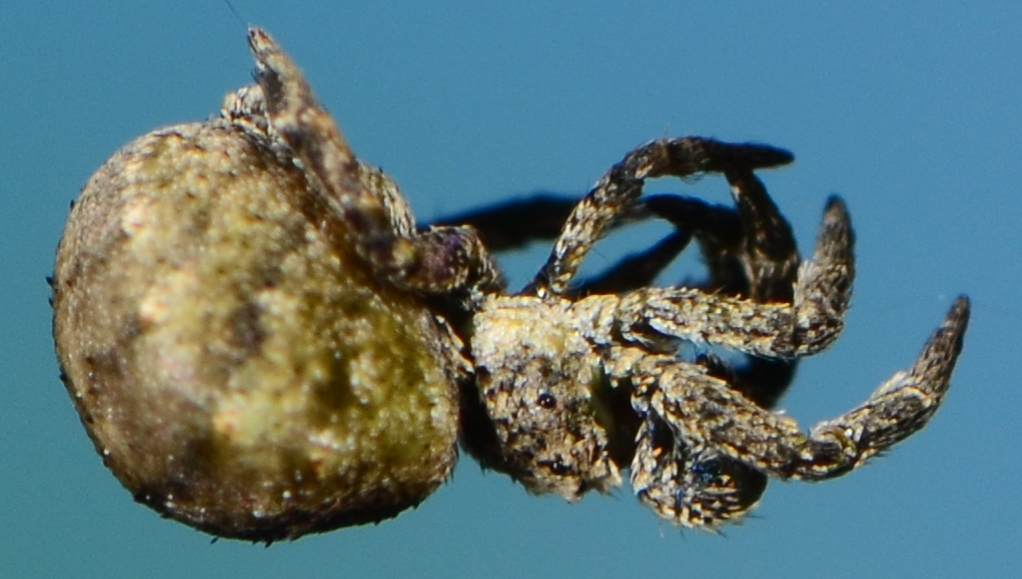
- Juvenile female

Scientific classification
- Kingdom: Animalia
- Phylum: Arthropoda
- Subphylum: Chelicerata
- Class: Arachnida
- Order: Araneae
- Infraorder: Araneomorphae
- Family: Uloboridae
- Genus: Hyptiotes
- Species: H. akermani

Binomial name
- Hyptiotes akermani Wiehle, 1964

= Hyptiotes akermani =

Ackerman's Triangle-Web Spider

Species of spider

Hyptiotes akermani is a species of spider in the family Uloboridae. It is endemic to South Africa and is commonly known as Ackerman's triangle-web spider.

== Distribution ==
Hyptiotes akermani is found only in South Africa, where it has been recorded from the provinces Eastern Cape, Gauteng, KwaZulu-Natal, and Limpopo.

Notable localities include Hogsback, Addo Elephant National Park, Mkambati Nature Reserve, Dinokeng, Cathedral Peak, Ifafa Beach, Loteni Nature Reserve, Blouberg Nature Reserve, and Lekgalameetse Nature Reserve.

== Habitat and ecology ==
Hyptiotes akermani produces a reduced orb-web consisting only of four radii connected to a single thread. The spider rests on this single thread, which is held under tension and manipulated when catching prey. The triangular webs are constructed in vegetation.

The species inhabits Forest, Grassland and Savanna biomes at altitudes ranging from 1 to 1706 m.

== Description ==
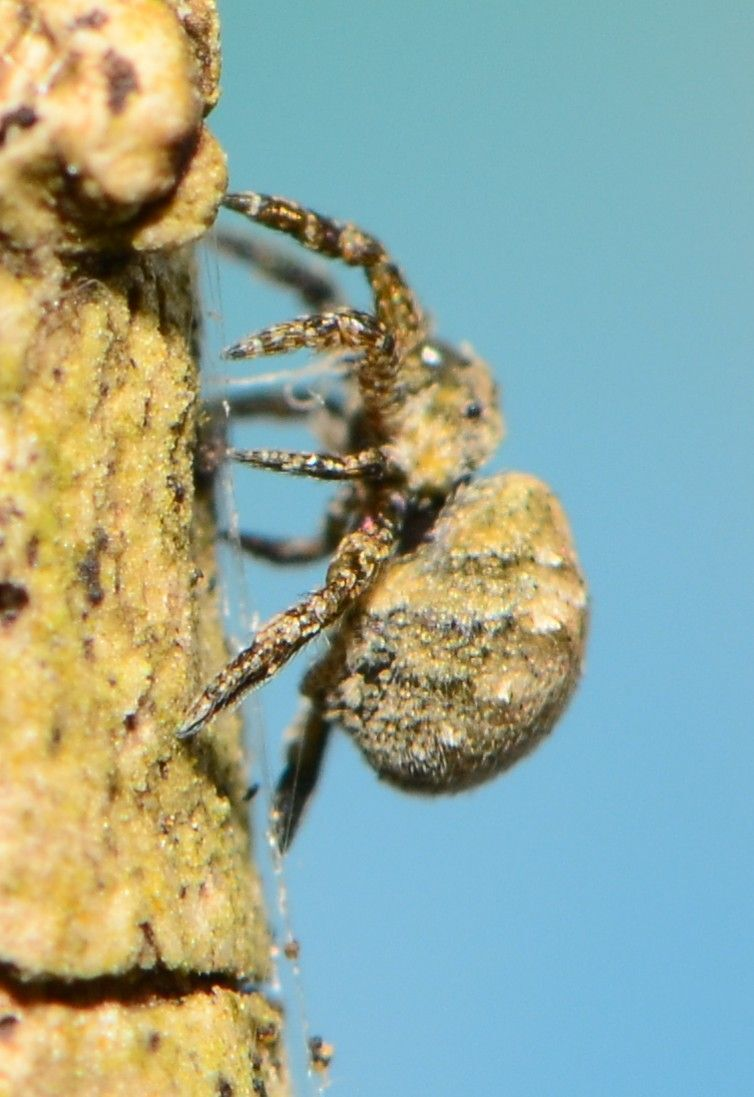
juvenile female

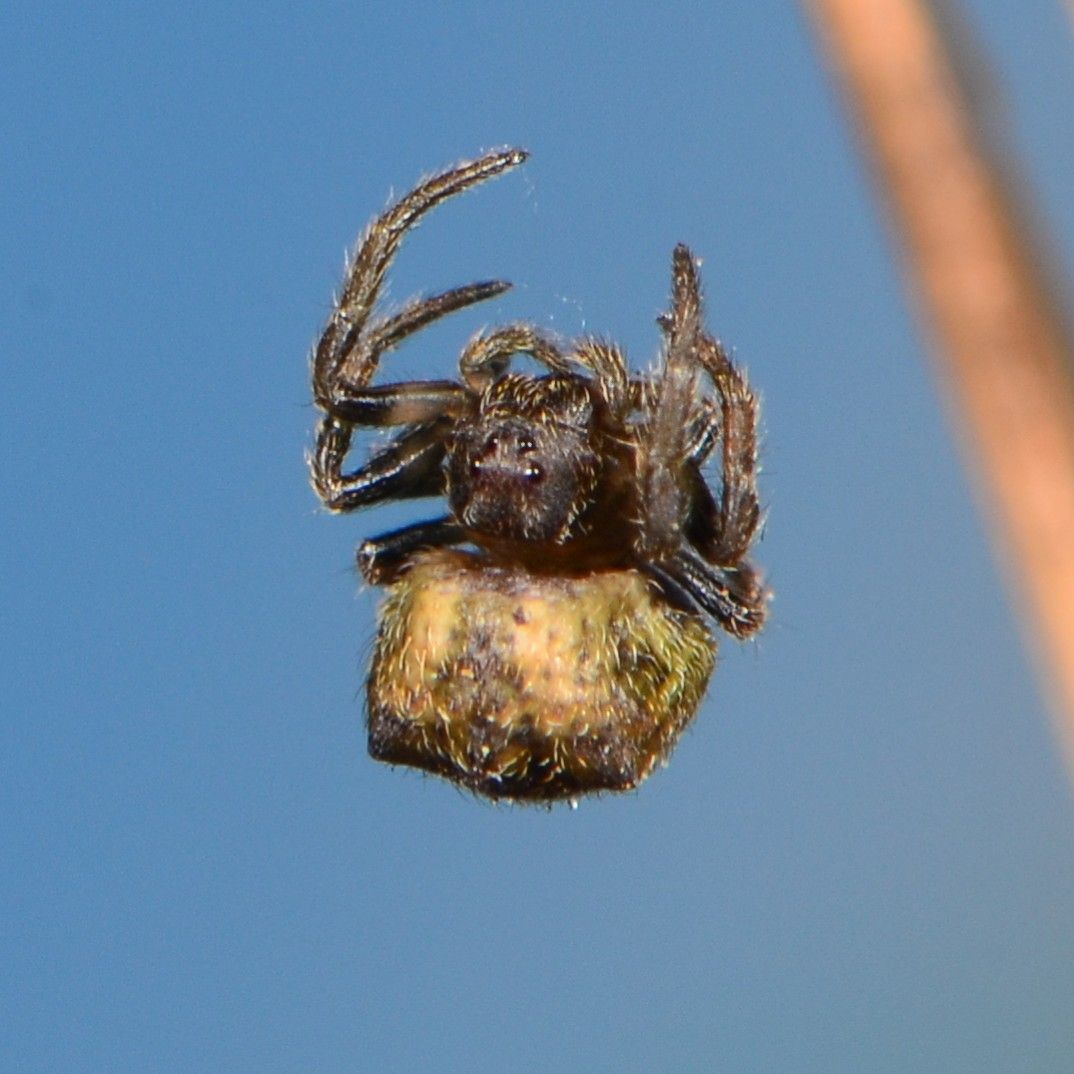
juvenile female

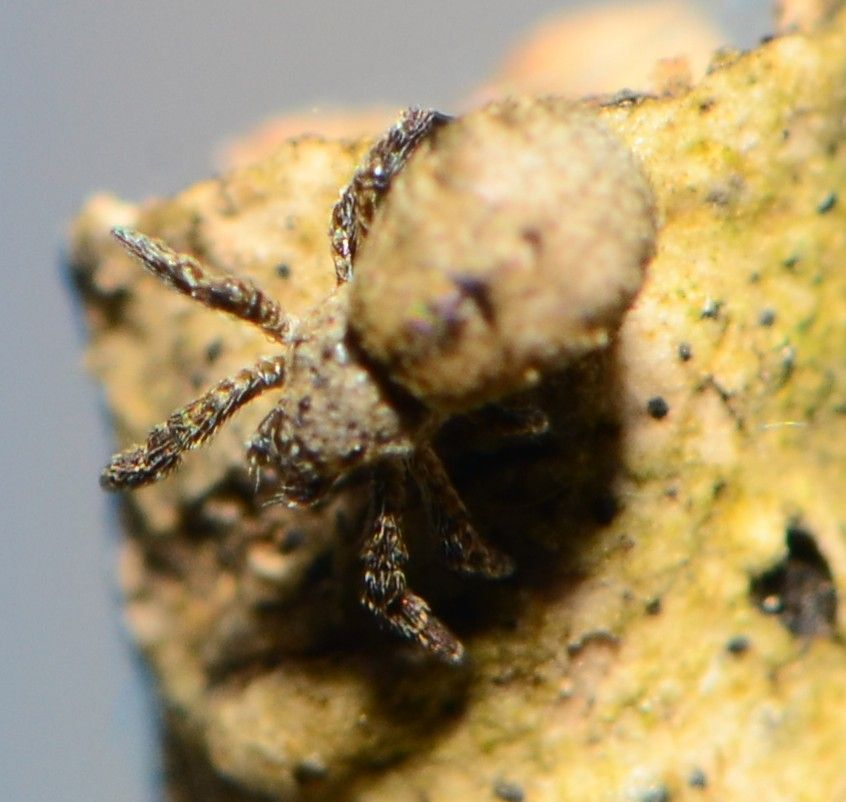
juvenile female

== Conservation ==
Hyptiotes akermani is listed as Least Concern by the South African National Biodiversity Institute due to its wide geographical range. The species is protected in several areas including Addo Elephant National Park, Mkambati Nature Reserve, Blouberg Nature Reserve, Lhuvhodo Nature Reserve and Lekgalameetse Nature Reserve.

== Taxonomy ==
Hyptiotes akermani was originally described by Wiehle in 1964 from Ifafa Beach in KwaZulu-Natal. The species is known only from females.
