= Miagrammopes mexicanus =

Scientific classification
- Domain: Eukaryota
- Kingdom: Animalia
- Phylum: Arthropoda
- Subphylum: Chelicerata
- Class: Arachnida
- Order: Araneae
- Infraorder: Araneomorphae
- Family: Uloboridae
- Genus: Miagrammopes
- Species: M. mexicanus

Binomial name
- Miagrammopes mexicanus O. P.-Cambridge, 1893

Species of spider

Miagrammopes mexicanus is a species of cribellate orb weaver in the spider family Uloboridae. It is found in the United States and Mexico.
