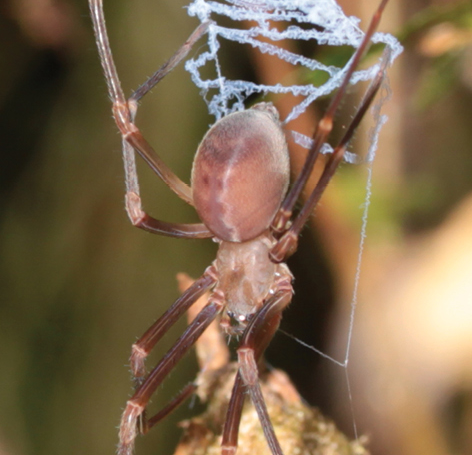
- P. otwayensis

Scientific classification
- Kingdom: Animalia
- Phylum: Arthropoda
- Subphylum: Chelicerata
- Class: Arachnida
- Order: Araneae
- Infraorder: Araneomorphae
- Family: Gradungulidae
- Genus: Progradungula; Forster & Gray, 1979

Type species
- P. carraiensis Forster & Gray, 1979

Species
- 3, see text

= Progradungula =

Genus of spiders

Progradungula is a genus of Australian large-clawed spiders that was first described by Raymond Robert Forster and Michael R. Gray in 1979.

The name is derived from Latin pro ("before"), and the genus name Gradungula, referring to the ancient ancestry of the genus. It is the first discovered web-building cribellate spider in a "primitive" araneomorph spider family and helped establish the idea that all araneomorph spiders evolved from cribellate ancestors.

These spiders have an uncommon web-making technique and prey-capturing behaviour. A small (approximately 25 mm × 6 mm (0.98 in × 0.24 in)), tilting, ladder-like platform of cribellate capturing silk is supported by an overhead structure of threads linked to the rock walls and consists of two parallel stabilizing silk lines.

== Species ==
As of October 2025, this genus includes three species:

- Progradungula barringtonensis Michalik & Smith, 2024 – Australia (New South Wales)
- Progradungula carraiensis Forster & Gray, 1979 – Australia (New South Wales) (type species)
- Progradungula otwayensis Milledge, 1997 – Australia (Victoria)
