= Miagrammopes ferdinandi =

Scientific classification
- Kingdom: Animalia
- Phylum: Arthropoda
- Subphylum: Chelicerata
- Class: Arachnida
- Order: Araneae
- Infraorder: Araneomorphae
- Family: Uloboridae
- Genus: Miagrammopes
- Species: M. ferdinandi

Binomial name
- Miagrammopes ferdinandi O. Pickard-Cambridge, 1870

Species of spider

Miagrammopes ferdinandi is a species of spider of the genus Miagrammopes. It is endemic to Sri Lanka.
