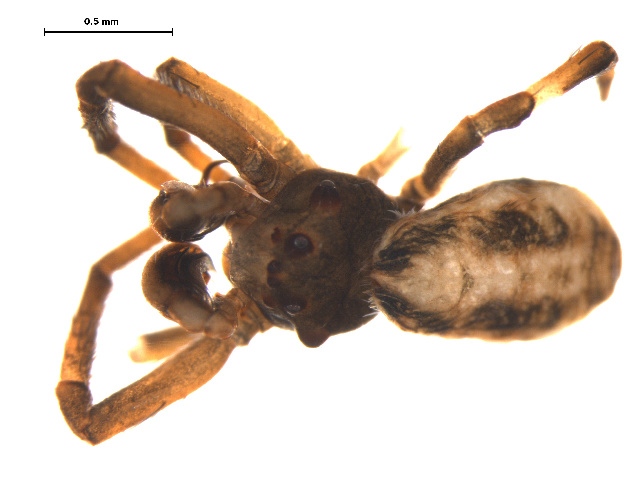
- H. gertshi, male
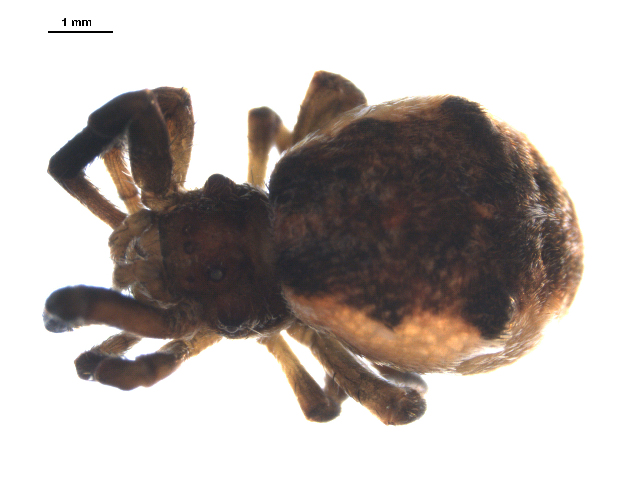
- H. gertshi, female

Scientific classification
- Kingdom: Animalia
- Phylum: Arthropoda
- Subphylum: Chelicerata
- Class: Arachnida
- Order: Araneae
- Infraorder: Araneomorphae
- Family: Uloboridae
- Genus: Hyptiotes
- Species: H. gertschi

Binomial name
- Hyptiotes gertschi Chamberlin & Ivie, 1935

= Hyptiotes gertschi =

Species of spider

Hyptiotes gertschi is a species of cribellate orb weaver in the spider family Uloboridae. It is found in the United States and Canada.
