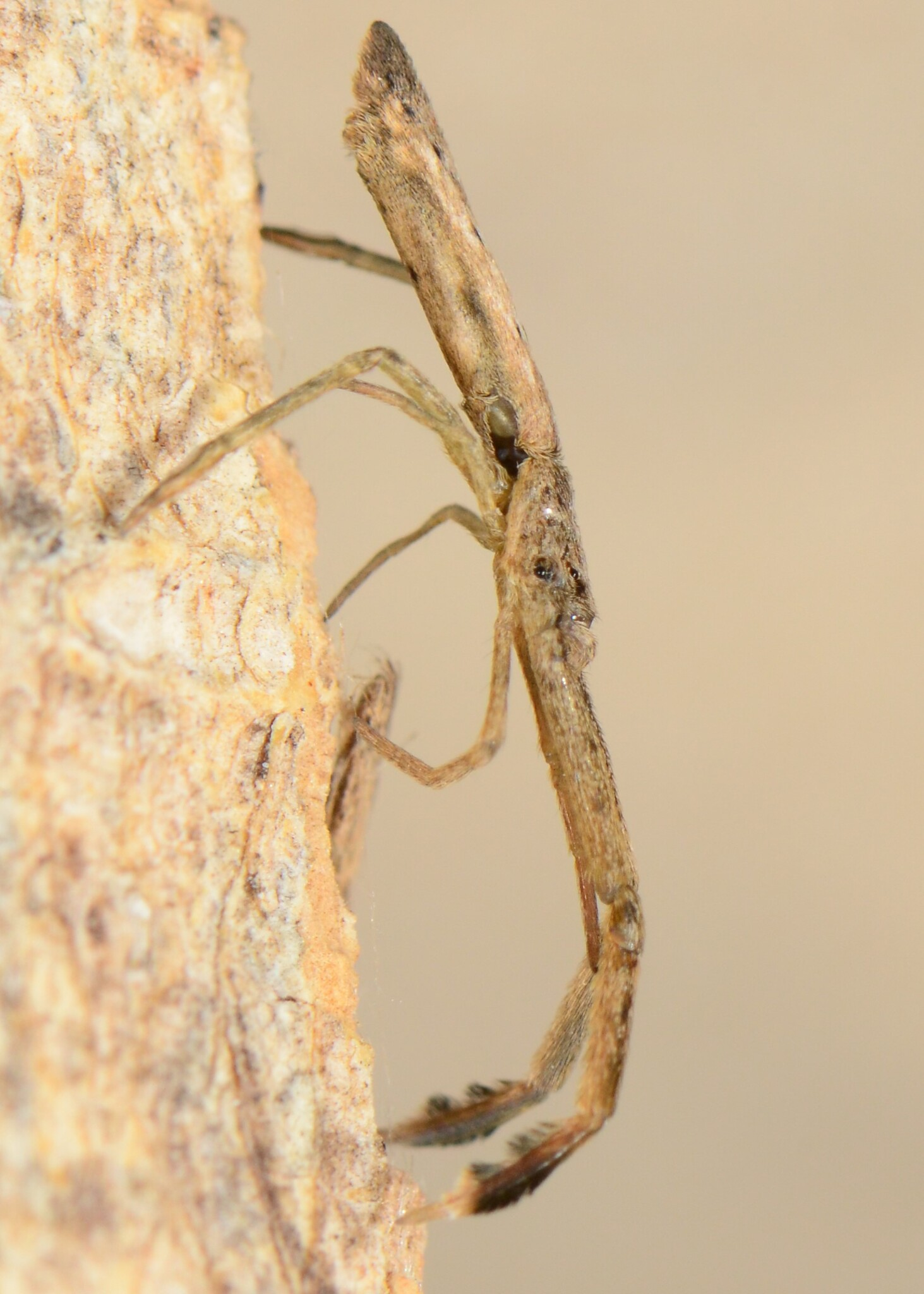
- Female

Scientific classification
- Kingdom: Animalia
- Phylum: Arthropoda
- Subphylum: Chelicerata
- Class: Arachnida
- Order: Araneae
- Infraorder: Araneomorphae
- Family: Uloboridae
- Genus: Miagrammopes
- Species: M. constrictus

Binomial name
- Miagrammopes constrictus Purcell, 1904

Synonyms
- Mumaia constricta Lehtinen, 1967

= Miagrammopes constrictus =

Six-spotted Single-Line Web Spider

Species of spider

Miagrammopes constrictus is a species of spider in the family Uloboridae. It is endemic to South Africa and is commonly known as the six-spotted single-line web spider.

== Distribution ==
Miagrammopes constrictus is found only in South Africa, where it has been recorded from the provinces Eastern Cape, Gauteng, KwaZulu-Natal, Limpopo, Mpumalanga, North West, and Western Cape.

Notable localities include Mountain Zebra National Park, Addo Elephant National Park, Hluhluwe Nature Reserve, Tembe Elephant Park, Ndumo Game Reserve, Luvhondo Nature Reserve, Polokwane Nature Reserve, and Kruger National Park.

== Habitat and ecology ==
The webs are made in vegetation and this species has been sampled from the Grassland, Nama Karoo and Savanna biomes at altitudes ranging from 17 to 1513 m.

== Description ==
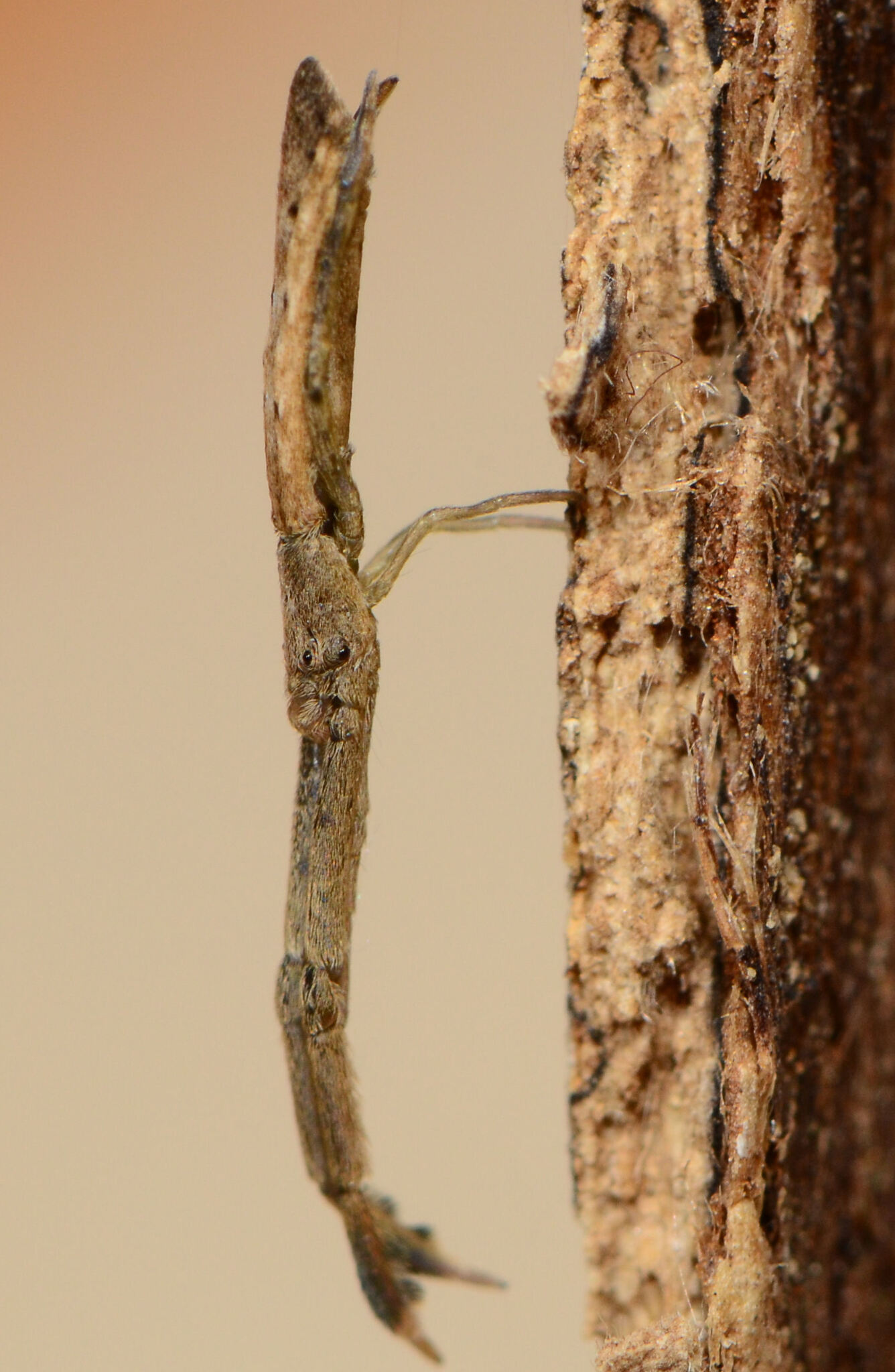

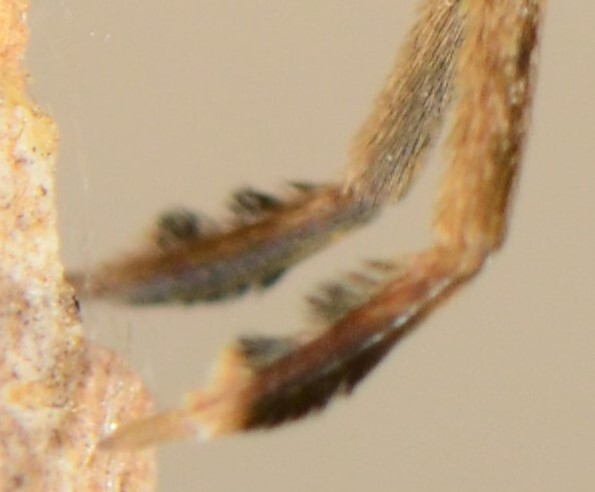
leg detail

Females are recognized by a thick mane of setae on tarsi I and an abdomen with six black spots.

== Conservation ==
Miagrammopes constrictus is listed as Least Concern by the South African National Biodiversity Institute due to its wide geographical range. The species is protected in several areas including Mountain Zebra National Park, Addo Elephant National Park, Hluhluwe Nature Reserve, Tembe Elephant Park and Vryheid Nature Reserve.

== Taxonomy ==
Miagrammopes constrictus was described by Purcell in 1904 from Durban. The species has not been revised and is known only from females.
