= Hyptiotes analis =

Scientific classification
- Kingdom: Animalia
- Phylum: Arthropoda
- Subphylum: Chelicerata
- Class: Arachnida
- Order: Araneae
- Infraorder: Araneomorphae
- Family: Uloboridae
- Genus: Hyptiotes
- Species: H. analis

Binomial name
- Hyptiotes analis Simon, 1892

Species of spider

Hyptiotes analis is a species of spider of the genus Hyptiotes. It is endemic to Sri Lanka.
