= Hyptiotes dentatus =

Scientific classification
- Kingdom: Animalia
- Phylum: Arthropoda
- Subphylum: Chelicerata
- Class: Arachnida
- Order: Araneae
- Infraorder: Araneomorphae
- Family: Uloboridae
- Genus: Hyptiotes
- Species: H. dentatus

Binomial name
- Hyptiotes dentatus Wunderlich, 2008

Species of spider

Hyptiotes dentatus is a spider species found in France.
