= Progradungula carraiensis =

Scientific classification
- Kingdom: Animalia
- Phylum: Arthropoda
- Subphylum: Chelicerata
- Class: Arachnida
- Order: Araneae
- Infraorder: Araneomorphae
- Family: Gradungulidae
- Genus: Progradungula
- Species: P. carraiensis

Binomial name
- Progradungula carraiensis Forster & Gray, 1979

Species of spider

Progradungula carraiensis, or the Carrai cave spider, is a cribellate spider found only in the moist forests and limestone caves of the Carrai Plateau in northern New South Wales. It is one of only three species in the gradungulid genus Progradungula.

These spiders are 8–12 mm (5/16–1/2 in) long, with long and slender legs. They specialize in eating insects that feed on bat guano in the Carrai Plateau caves.

To catch prey, they build a special web with an upper network of threads attached to the rock walls. This supports a small (25 mm × 6 mm (1 in × 1/4 in)) platform made of cribellate silk. The spider sits head down on the platform and extends its front legs until the enlarged tarsal claws on their front legs are just above the ground. With these, they then scoop their prey into their web, which wraps around the insect.
