= Calamistrum =

Leg structure in spiders

In spiders, the calamistrum is a row of specialized leg bristles used to comb out fine bands of silk. It is only found on cribellate spiders, that is, spiders that possess the spinning organ known as the cribellum. The calamistrum and cribellum are used to form the hackled bands of silk which are characteristic of the webs of these spiders. The calamistrum is found on the upper margin of the metatarsus of the hind legs. Each bristle of the calamistrum is serrated on one side and smooth on the other.

The length of a spider's calamistrum is always equal to or greater than the width of the cribellum. The ratio between calamistrum length and cribellum width varies greatly, however, even among related species. This is likely due to differences in spinning behavior and as well as differences in the size and shape of the legs and abdomen.

When male cribellate spiders reach sexual maturity, they either lose the cribellum and calamistrum or retain them in a vestigial form.

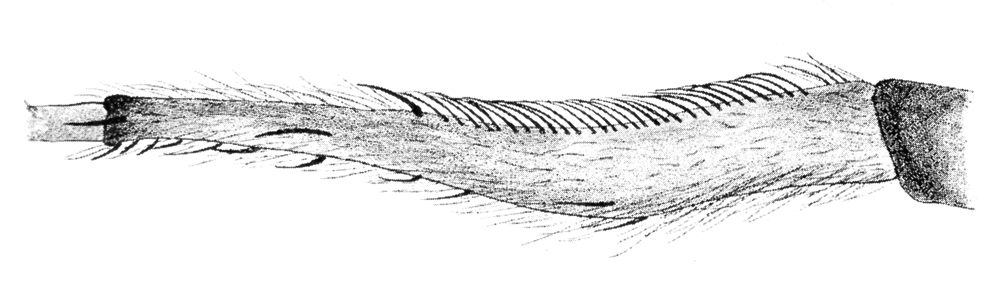
Calamistrum of Zosis geniculata
