= C22orf39 =

Human gene

Identifiers
- Aliases: C22orf39, chromosome 22 open reading frame 39
- External IDs: MGI: 1919557; HomoloGene: 138422; GeneCards: C22orf39; OMA:C22orf39 - orthologs

Gene location (Human)
Chr.	Chromosome 22 (human)
Band	22q11.21	Start	19,351,368 bp
Band	22q11.21	End	19,447,711 bp

Gene location (Mouse)
Chr.	Chromosome 16 (mouse)
Band	16|16 A3	Start	18,655,328 bp
Band	16|16 A3	End	18,658,910 bp
RNA expression pattern
Bgee	Human / Mouse (ortholog); Top expressed in: gastrocnemius muscle; muscle of thigh; tibialis anterior muscle; skeletal muscle tissue; deltoid muscle; cingulate gyrus; anterior cingulate cortex; quadriceps femoris muscle; amygdala; vastus lateralis muscle / Top expressed in: neural layer of retina; right kidney; proximal tubule; Region II of hippocampus proper; yolk sac; lip; muscle of thigh; plantaris muscle; interventricular septum; thymus; More reference expression data
BioGPS	n/a
Orthologs
Species	Human	Mouse
Entrez	128977	72307
Ensembl	ENSG00000242259	ENSMUSG00000071632
UniProt	Q6P5X5	Q3U595
RefSeq (mRNA)	NM_173793; NM_001166242	NM_001033164
RefSeq (protein)	NP_001159714; NP_776154	NP_001028336
Location (UCSC)	Chr 22: 19.35 – 19.45 Mb	Chr 16: 18.66 – 18.66 Mb
PubMed search
- Wikidata
View/Edit Human	View/Edit Mouse

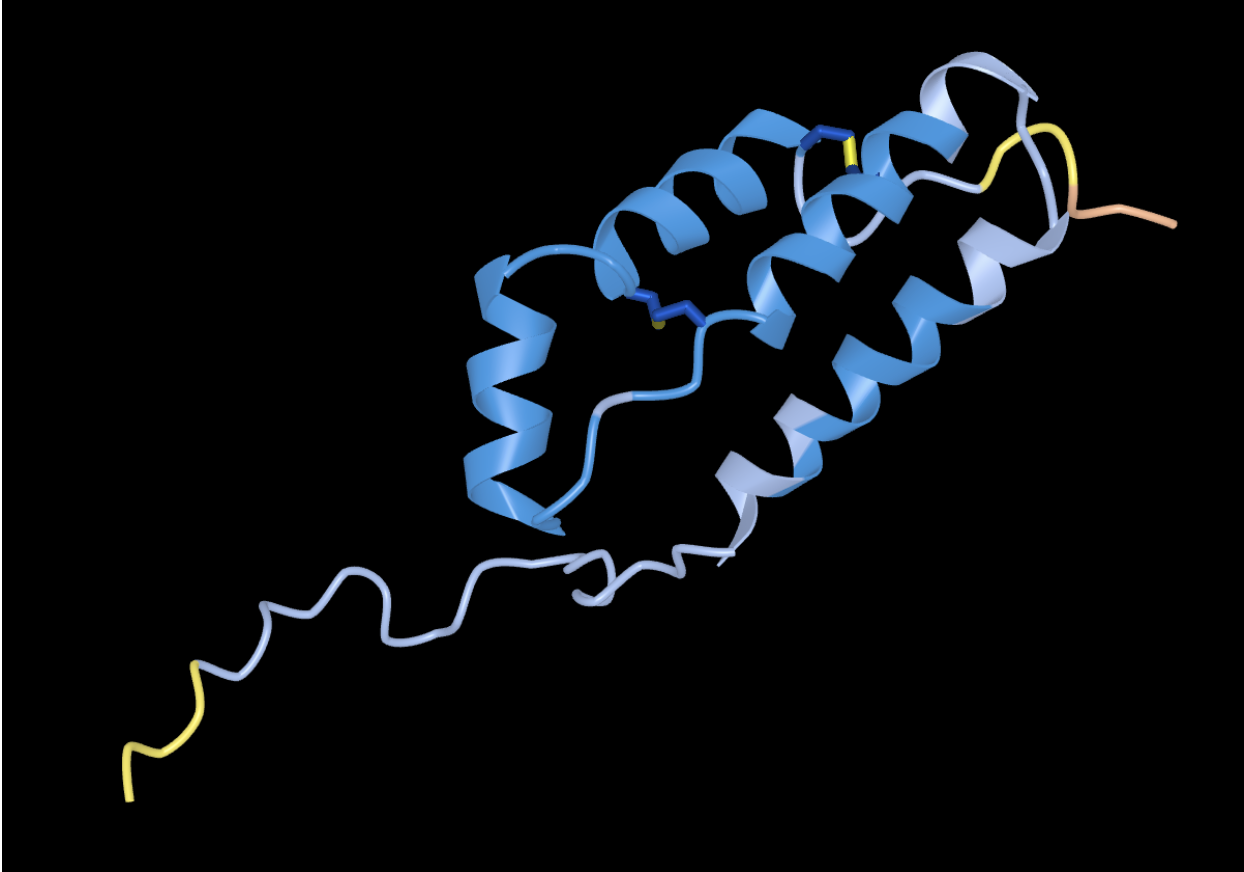
Tertiary structure of the C22orf39 protein

Synaptic plasticity regulator Plasticity Associated Neural Transcript (PANTS) is a protein which in humans is encoded by the C22orf39 gene. C22orf39 is expressed at high levels throughout the body, though expression is highest in skeletal muscle and the heart.

== Gene ==
The human C22orf39 gene is located on the minus strand on chromosome 22 (22q11.21), has 3 exons, and spans 6,826 bp.

== Transcript ==
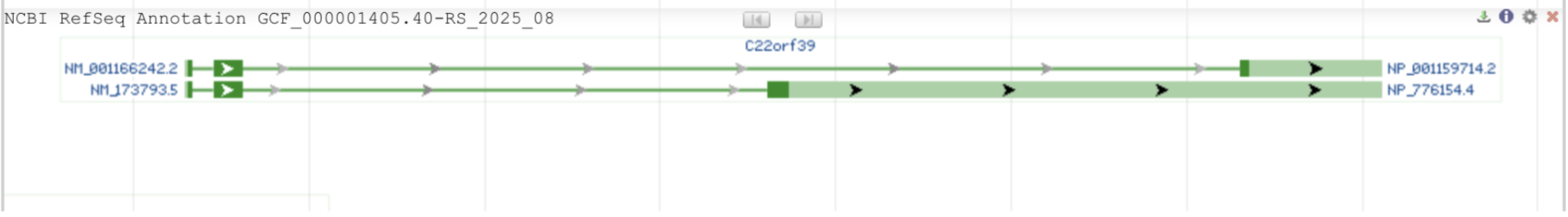
Alternate splice forms of the C22orf39 transcript

Human C22orf39 has 2 main transcripts. Variant 1 is 318 nt long and differs from Variant 2 by having a longer but overlapping 3’ exon and encoding a different C-terminus of the C22orf39 protein. Both transcripts are the same total length with the same number of exons.

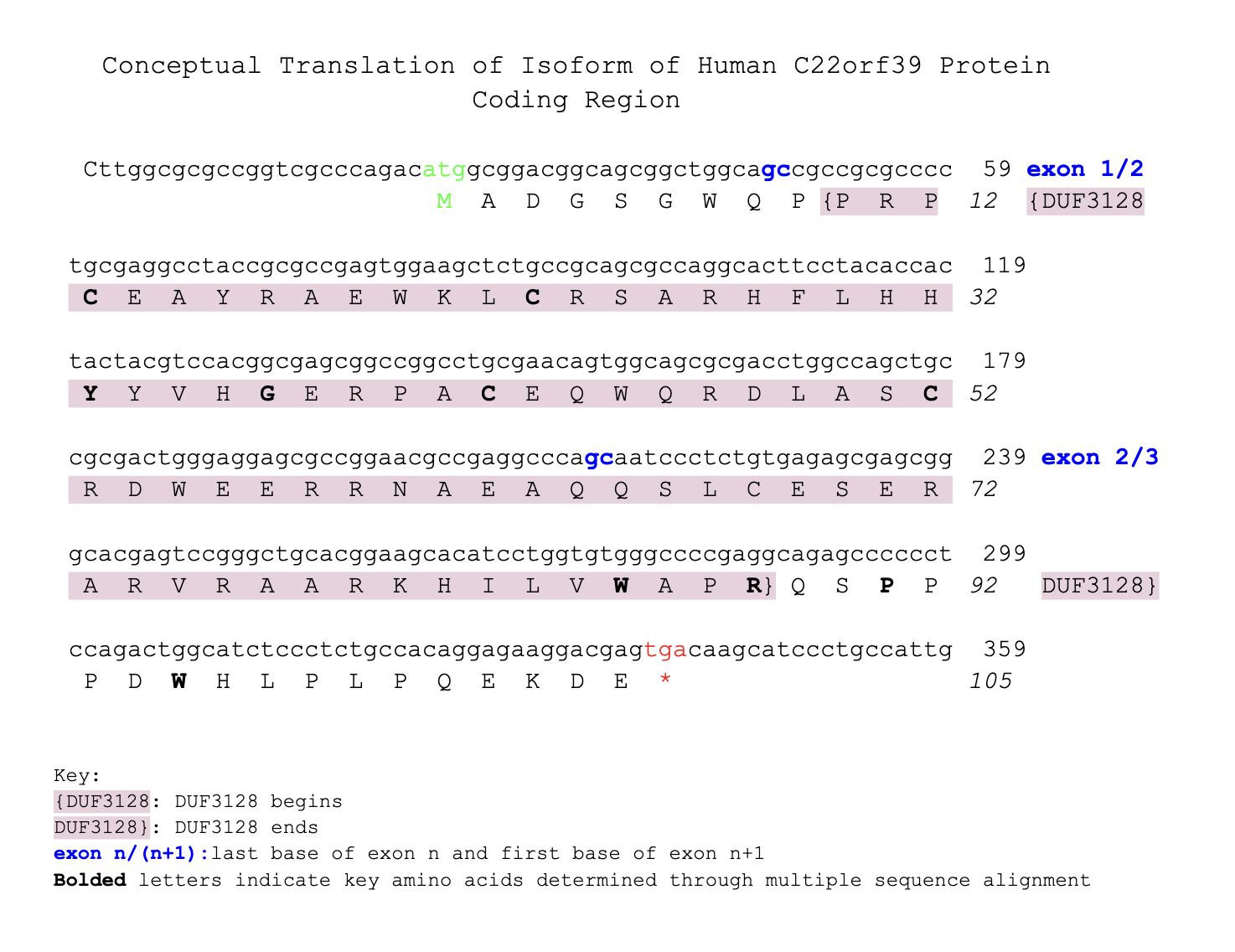
Conceptual translation of isoform of human C22orf39 protein coding region

== Protein ==
In humans, C22orf39 comes in two isoforms, 1 (105 aa) and 2 (80 aa). Isoform 1 of C22orf39 has a calculated molecular weight of approximately 12.4 kDa and an isoelectric point (pI) of 7.71 in humans, though pI is not conserved throughout homologs. C22orf39 has a domain of unknown function (DUF3128). The C22orf39 protein is tryptophan and arginine rich and low in threonine.

== Regulation ==
=== Gene ===
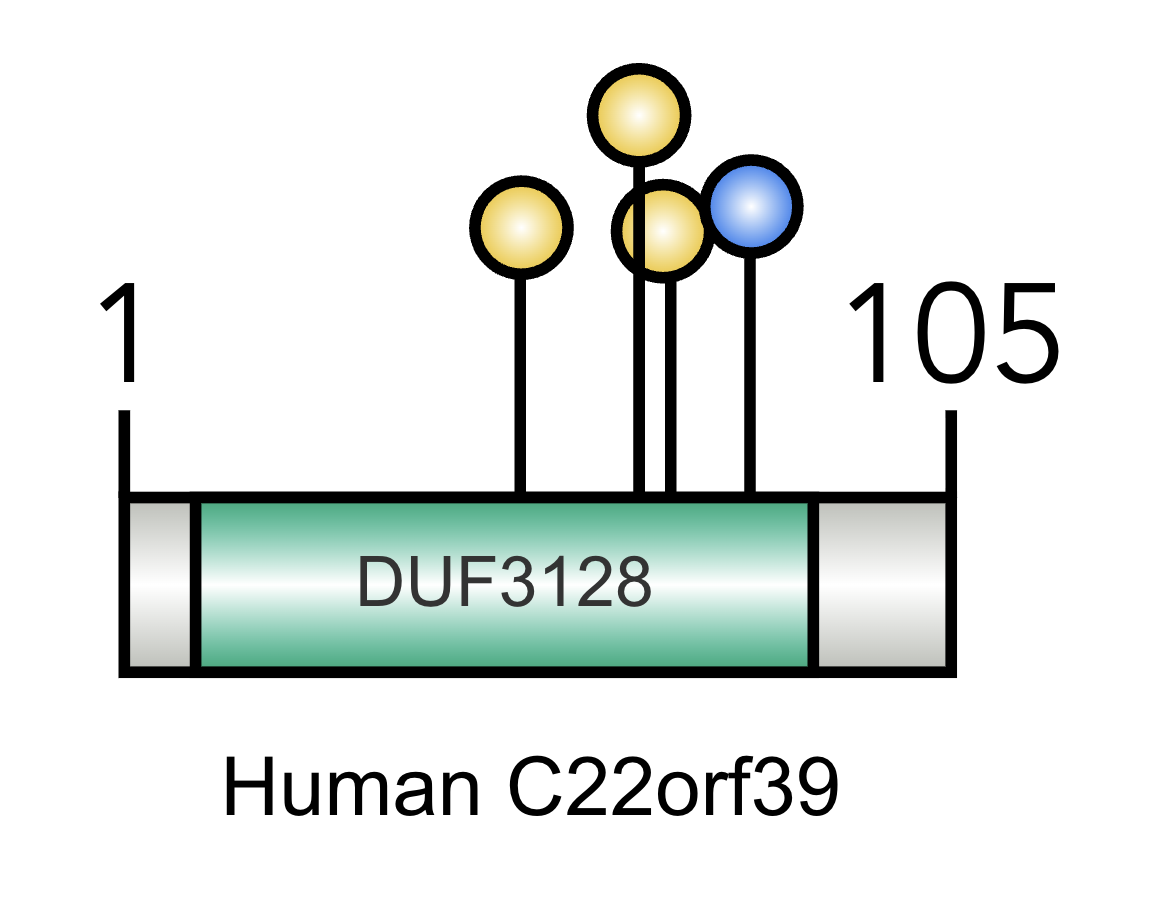
C22orf39 protein schematic with predicted phosphorylation sites in yellow and acetylation site in blue

C22orf39 has variable expression at relatively high levels throughout most tissues in the body. mRNA expression of C22orf39 is highest in skeletal muscle and the heart. The C22orf39 protein is also found abundantly throughout the whole organism. Antibody imaging reveals that C22orf39 is localized to the endoplasmic reticulum.

=== Transcript ===
C22orf39 has a highly conserved miRNA binding site in the 3' UTR.

=== Protein (post-translational modifications) ===
C22orf39 is localized to the cytoplasm or mitochondria. C22orf39 has several predicted phosphorylation sites and an acetylation site.

== Homology/evolution ==
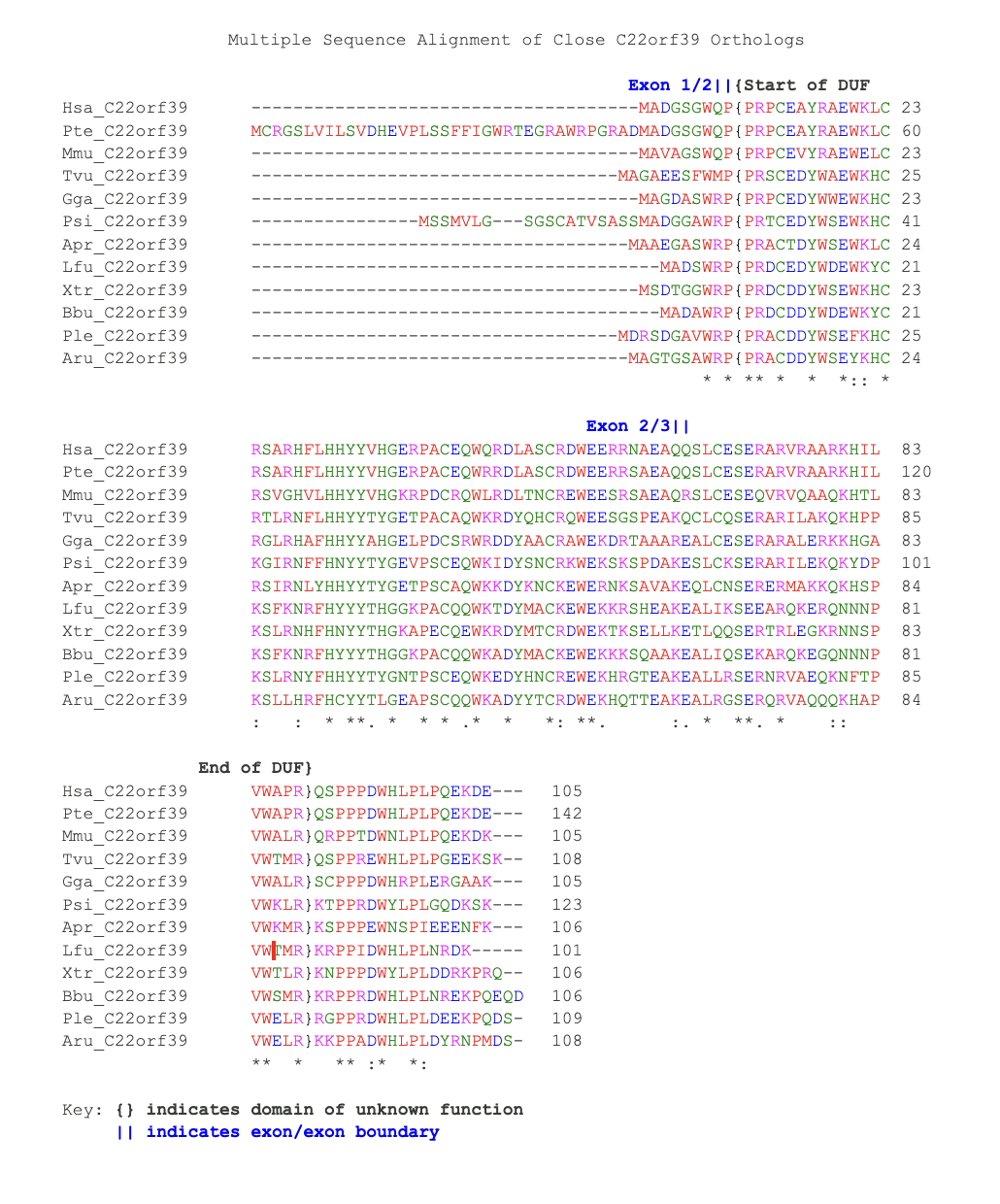
Multiple sequence alignment of close, vertebrate C22orf39 orthologs

C22orf39 has no paralogs.

C22orf39 orthologs are found in almost all multicellular animals, excluding several select taxonomic groups including flatworms and roundworms. The most distant related orthologs are sponges. Orthologs range in sequence identity from 24% to 98%: mammals (60-98%), birds/reptiles (50-59%), amphibians (46-50%), fish (49-50%), and invertebrates (24-39%).

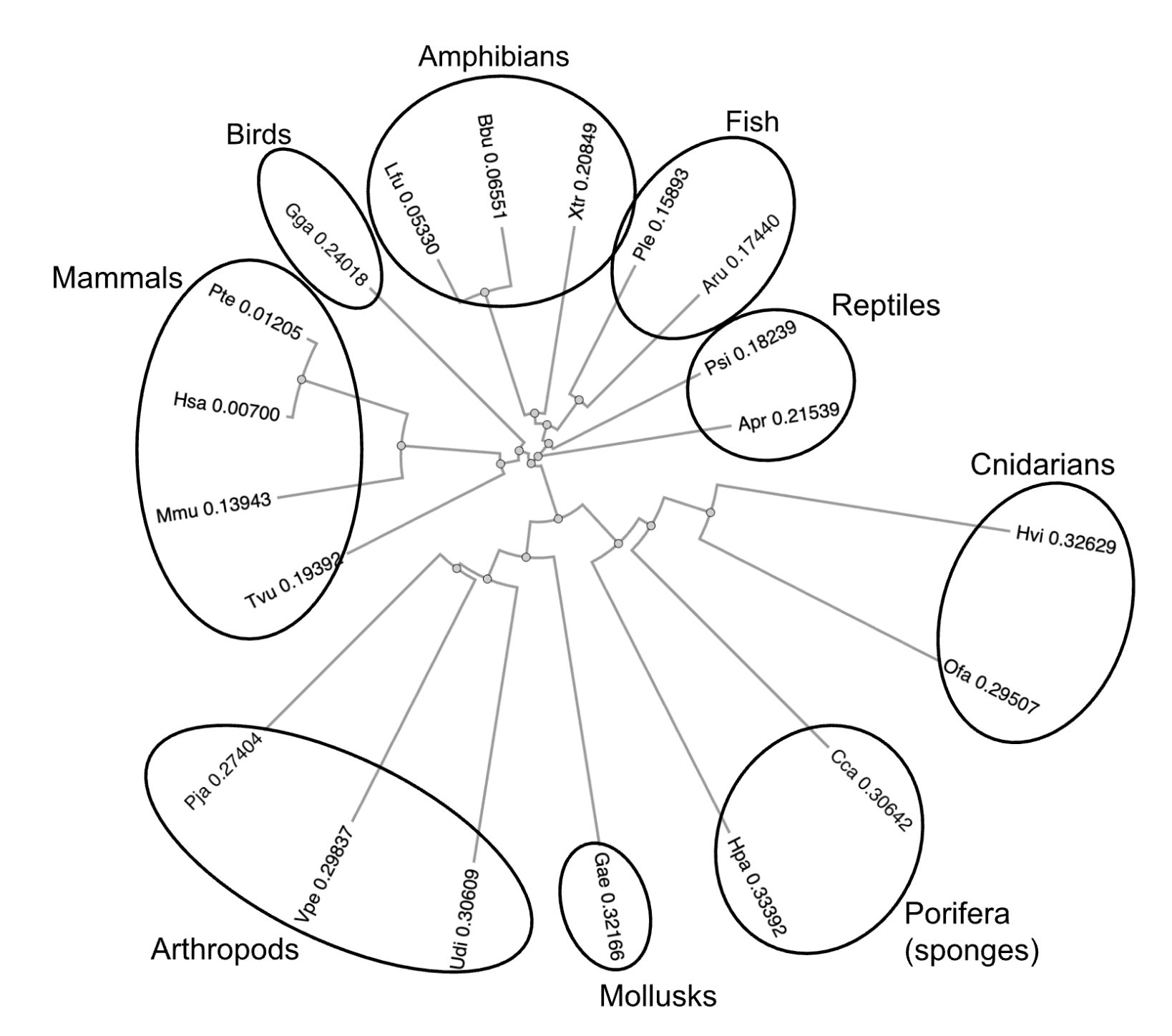
Phylogenetic tree of C22orf39 orthologs

C22orf39 Orthologs
	Genus/Species	Common Name	Taxonomic Group	Date of Divergence (MYA)	Accession #	Sequence Length	Sequence Identity %	Sequence Similarity %
Mammals	Homo sapiens	Human	Primate	0	NP_776154.4	105	100	100
	Piliocolobus tephrosceles	Red Colobus Monkey	Primate	28.8	XP_023048350.2	142	98	100
	Mus musculus	Mouse	Rodentia	87	NP_001028336.1	81	72	82
	Trichosurus vulpecula	Bushtail Possum	Marsupial	160	XP_036613470.1	108	60	75
Birds/Reptiles	Gallus gallus	Chicken	Avian	319	XP_015131179.1	105	59	68
	Pelodiscus sinensis	Chinese Softshell Turtle	Testudines	319	XP_006135010.3	123	51	75
	Ahaetulla prasina	Vine Snake	Squamata	319	XP_058014370.1	106	50	72
Amphibians	Leptodactylus fuscus	Rufous Frog	Amphibian	352	XP_075132091.1	106	48	70
	Xenopus tropicalis	Western Clawed Frog	Amphibian	352	XP_004910632.1	106	47	69
	Bufo bufo	Common Toad	Amphibian	352	XP_040272282.1	106	46	71
Fish	Acipenser ruthenus	Sterlet Sturgeon	Fish	429	XP_058888772.1	108	50	66
	Plectropomus leopardus	Leopard Coral Grouper	Fish	429	XP_042344043.1	109	49	69
Invertebrates: Cnidarians	Orbicella faveolata	Star Coral	Anthozoa	685	XP_020628890.1	109	24	53
	Hydra viridissima	Hydra	Hydrozoa	685	XP_079916326.1	108	24	42
Invertebrates: Anthropods	Penaeus japonicus	Prawn	Crustacean	686	XP_042862443.1	149	36	56
	Vespula pensylvanica	Western Yellow Jacket	Insect	686	XP_043677143.1	145	35	58
	Uloborus diversus	Orb Weaver	Spider	686	XP_054709478.1	156	31	51
Invertebrates: Mollusks	Gigantopelta aegis	Sea Snail	Gastropod	686	XP_041347459.1	150	39	58
Invertebrates: Sponges	Halichondria panicea	Breadcrumb Sponge	Porifera	758	XP_064392711.1	115	33	40
	Corticium candelabrum	Marine Sponge	Porifera	758	XP_062516804.1	119	27	34

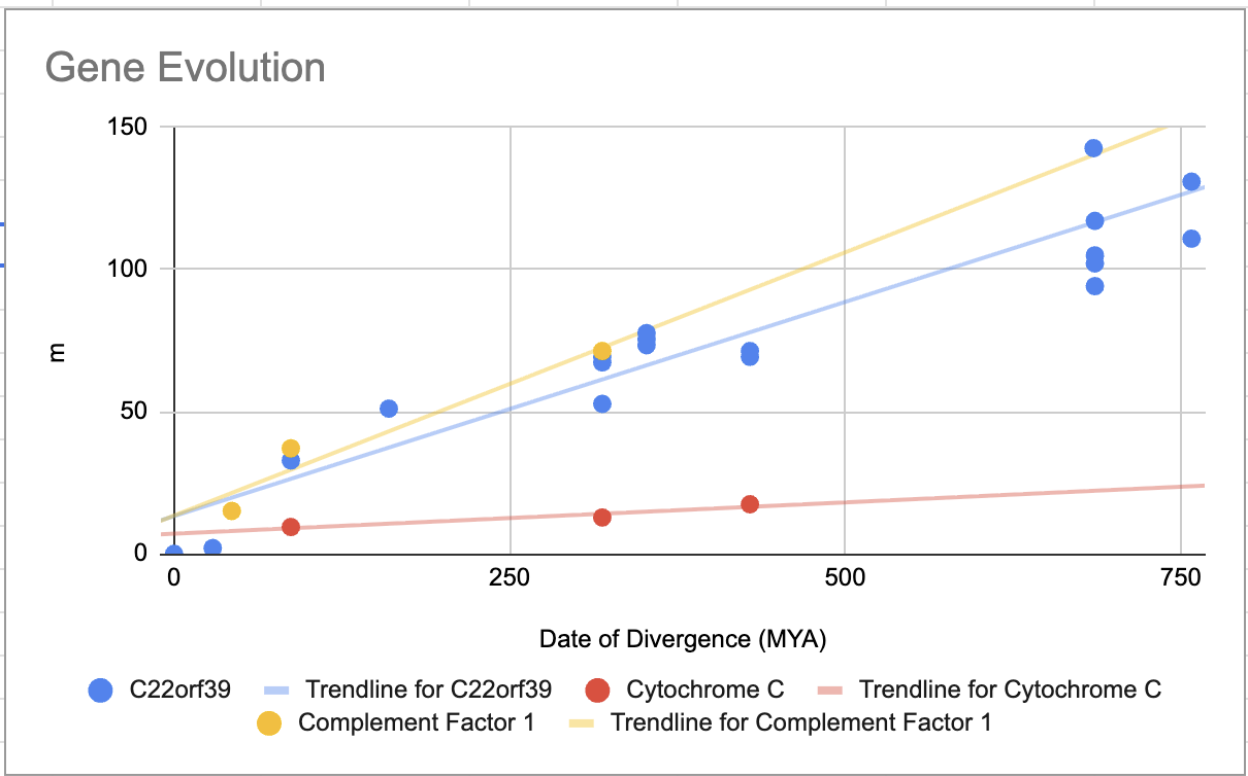
Rate of evolution for the C22orf39 gene in comparison to two reference genes

Comparing C22orf39 ortholog data to the known evolution rates of cytochrome C and complement factor 1 suggests that the C22orf39 gene evolves relatively quickly.

== Clinical significance ==
In a study inducing hepatocarcinogenesis (production of liver cancer) in mice through overexpression of the human MYC gene, the C22orf39 gene was shown to be silenced in PICM-19 cells (a liver cell line from fetal pigs) following MYC-induction (the overexpression of MYC oncogenes), suggesting that the absence of the C22orf39 protein is necessary for carcinogenesis.

C22orf39 is part of the regulatory network of transcription factor breast cancer type 1 susceptibility protein (BRCA1), the up-regulation of which has a high connectivity with differentially expressed genes (DEG’s) that may contribute to increased risk of esophageal squamous cell carcinoma (ESCC).

Individuals with Duchenne muscular dystrophy are shown to have lower C22orf39 expression, though this is likely an effect of the condition rather than a cause.

A study of 22q11.2 deletion syndrome in mice (a condition that increases risk of schizophrenia, among other neurological and physiological issues), identified a C22orf39 ortholog in mice (referred to as mouse Pants). In control mice, Pants was found to have increased expression in the hippocampus of aging mouse brains. This study suggests that the loss of C22orf39 in 22q11.2 deletion syndrome could be a major contributor to the age-related plasticity deficits displayed by mice with this deletion.
