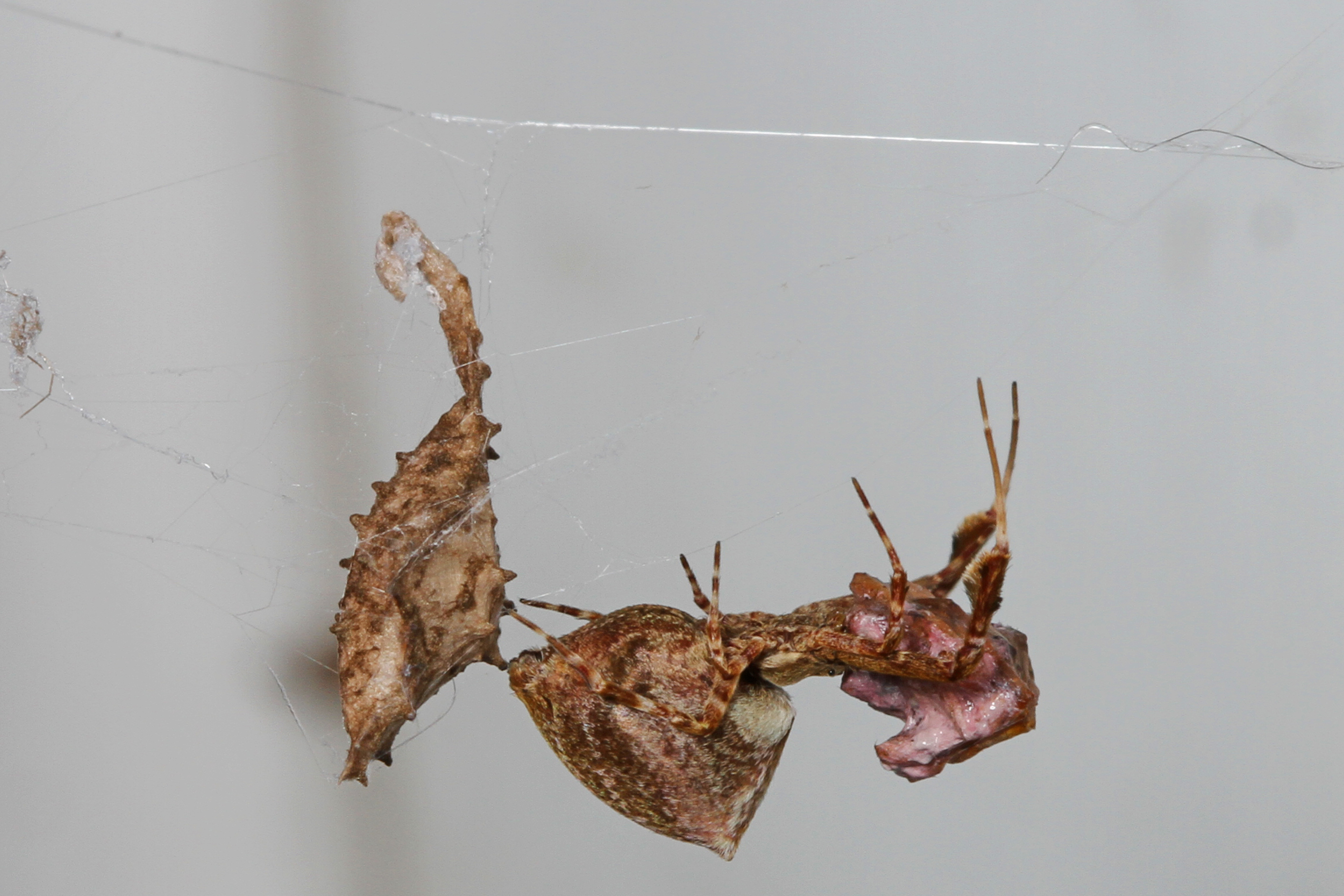
- On the left is her distinctive egg sac, in the center roughly triangular abdomen and on the right pink food.

Scientific classification
- Domain: Eukaryota
- Kingdom: Animalia
- Phylum: Arthropoda
- Subphylum: Chelicerata
- Class: Arachnida
- Order: Araneae
- Infraorder: Araneomorphae
- Family: Uloboridae
- Genus: Uloborus
- Species: U. glomosus

Binomial name
- Uloborus glomosus (Walckenaer, 1841)

= Uloborus glomosus =

Species of spider

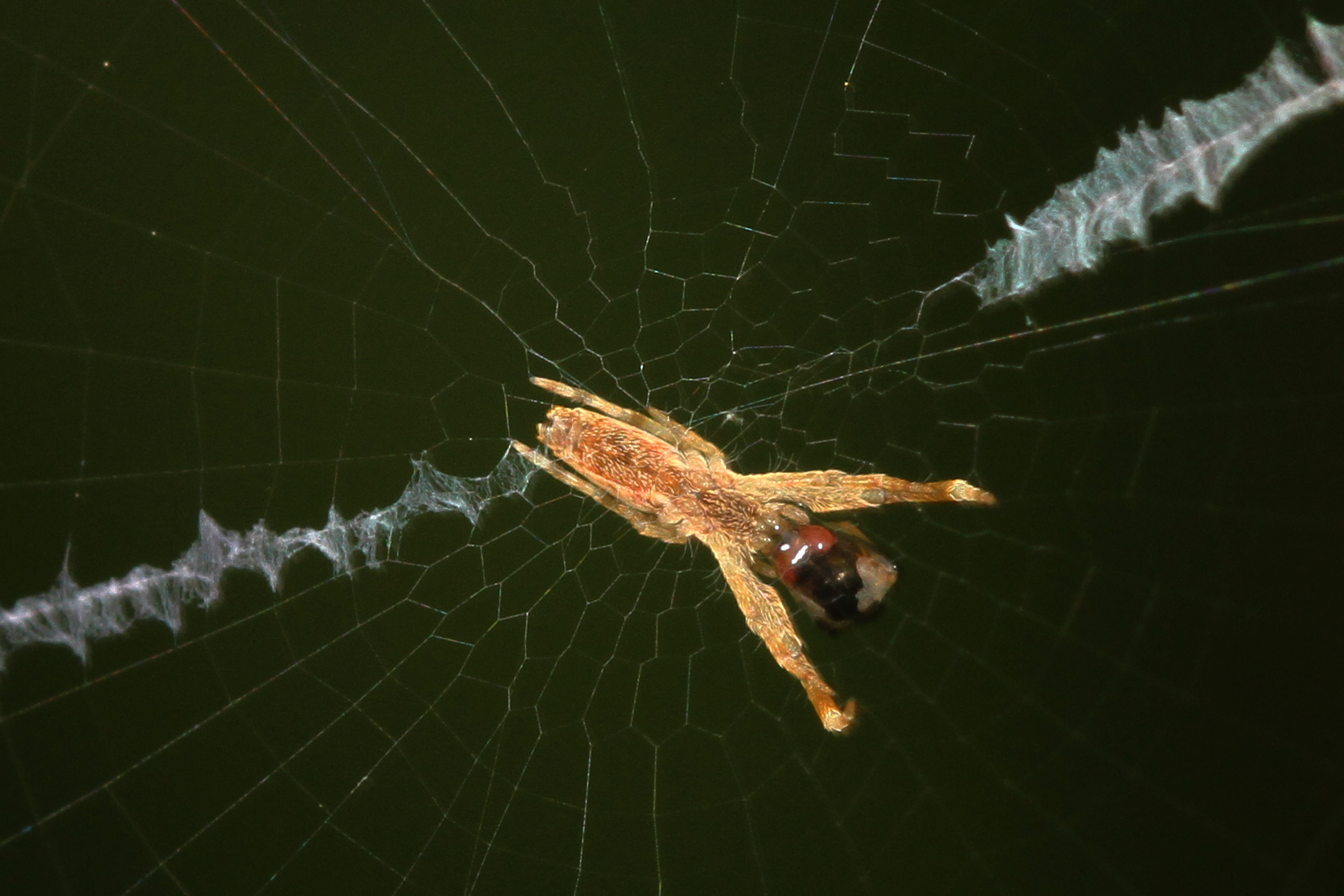
Web

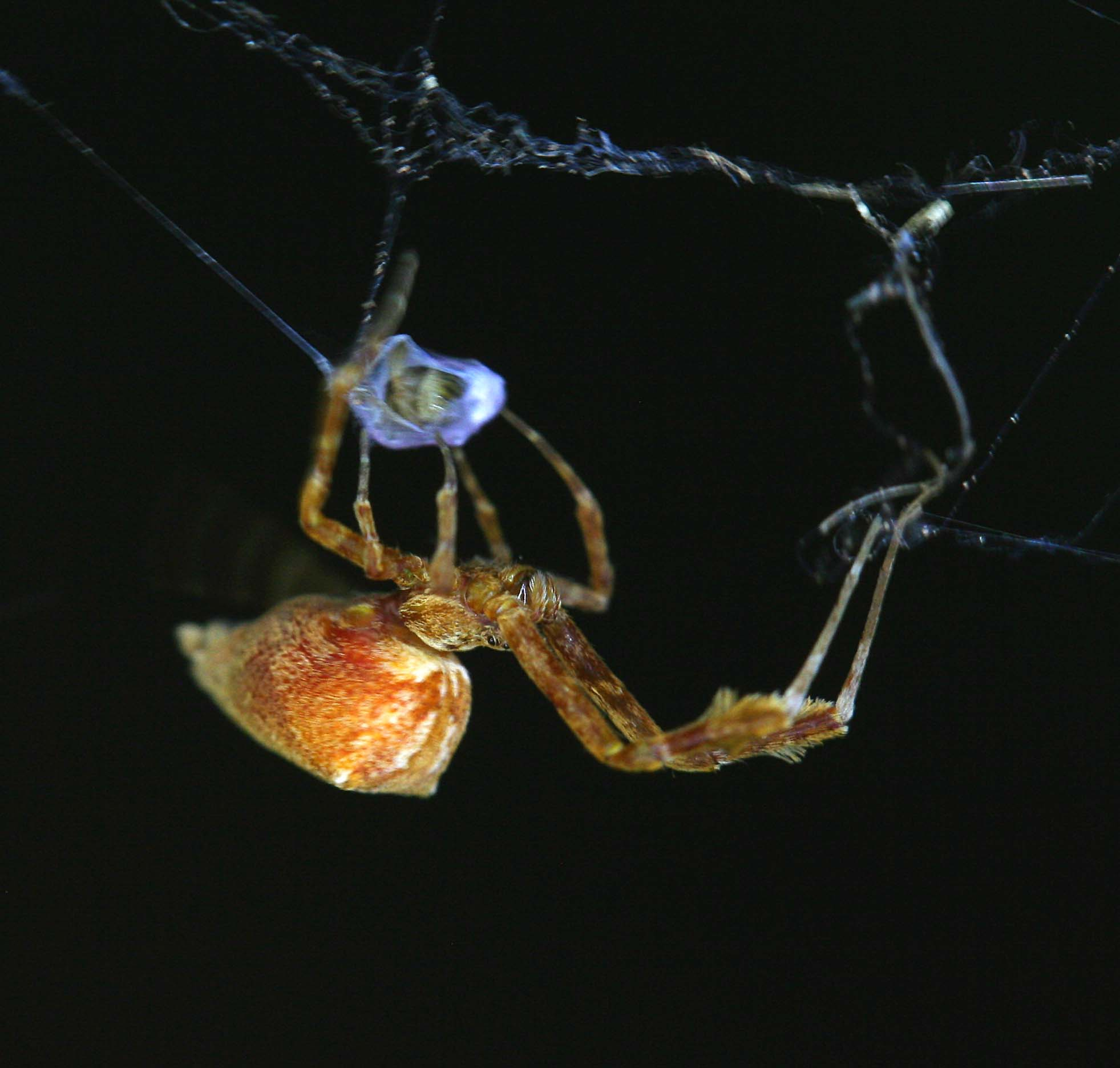
Wrapping prey

Uloborus glomosus is a species of spider in the family Uloboridae. It is one of only a few Uloborus species found in North America and the only species found in Canada. Like all other species in the Uloboridae, Uloborus glomosus does not possess venom glands, relying instead on cribellate, a fuzzy non sticky silk that they use to trap and then wrap their prey. This species exhibits different disturbance behaviors depending on factors such as the time of day, and presence of eggsacs in the web. They may jump from the web, move to the edge, remain in the center, or jerk the web to shake it. If eggsacs are present, the female spider will jerk at the web and if not present, then the female spider will walk to the opposite side of the web.
