= Uloborus rufus =

Scientific classification
- Domain: Eukaryota
- Kingdom: Animalia
- Phylum: Arthropoda
- Subphylum: Chelicerata
- Class: Arachnida
- Order: Araneae
- Infraorder: Araneomorphae
- Family: Uloboridae
- Genus: Uloborus
- Species: U. rufus

Binomial name
- Uloborus rufus Schmidt & Krause, 1995

Species of spider

Uloborus rufus is a species of spiders of the family Uloboridae. It is endemic in Cape Verde. The species was named and described by Günter E. W. Schmidt and Rolf Harald Krause in 1995.
