= Uloborus umboniger =

Scientific classification
- Kingdom: Animalia
- Phylum: Arthropoda
- Subphylum: Chelicerata
- Class: Arachnida
- Order: Araneae
- Infraorder: Araneomorphae
- Family: Uloboridae
- Genus: Uloborus
- Species: U. umboniger

Binomial name
- Uloborus umboniger Kulczyński, 1908

Species of spider

Uloborus umboniger, is a species of spider of the genus Uloborus. It is endemic to Sri Lanka.
