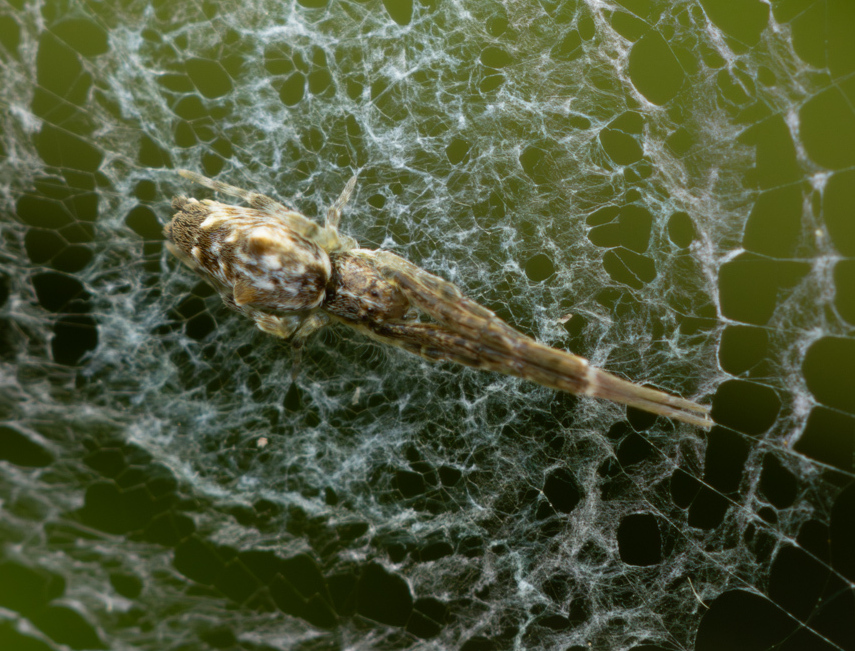
- juvenile
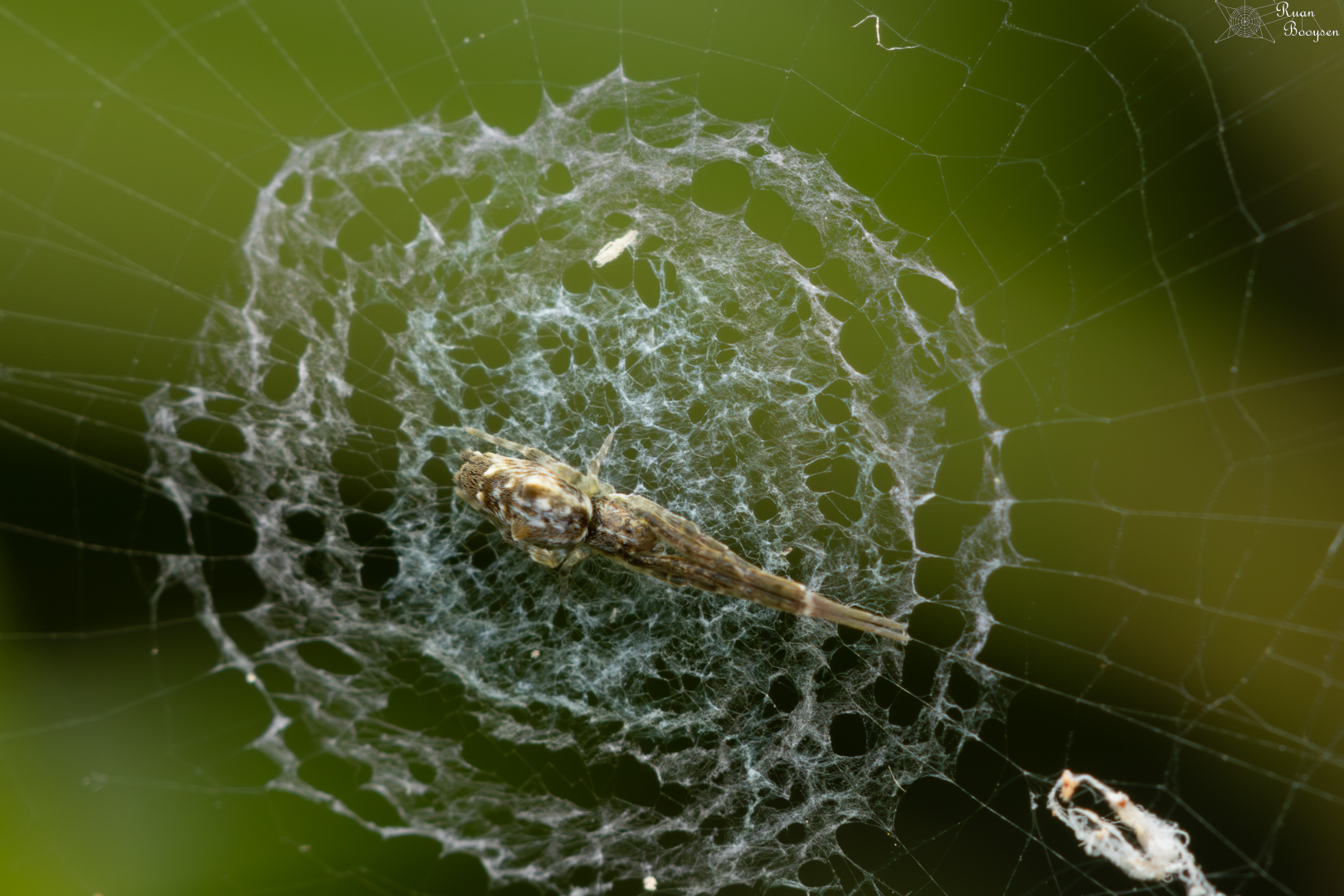
- juvenile

Scientific classification
- Kingdom: Animalia
- Phylum: Arthropoda
- Subphylum: Chelicerata
- Class: Arachnida
- Order: Araneae
- Infraorder: Araneomorphae
- Family: Uloboridae
- Genus: Uloborus
- Species: U. planipedius

Binomial name
- Uloborus planipedius Simon, 1897

Synonyms
- Uloborus planipedellus Strand, 1907

= Uloborus planipedius =

Species of spider

Uloborus planipedius is a species of spider in the family Uloboridae. It is endemic to South Africa.

== Distribution ==
Uloborus planipedius is found only in South Africa, where it has been recorded from the provinces Eastern Cape, KwaZulu-Natal, Limpopo, and Western Cape.

Notable localities include Mountain Zebra National Park, Addo Elephant National Park, Port Elizabeth, Ndumo Game Reserve, Kruger National Park, Limpopo Valley Nature Reserve, and Karoo National Park.

== Habitat and ecology ==
Uloborus planipedius is an orb-web spider making webs with cribellate silk in vegetation in the Forest, Grassland, Nama Karoo and Savanna biomes at altitudes ranging from 7 to 1513 m.

== Conservation ==
Uloborus planipedius is listed as Least Concern by the South African National Biodiversity Institute due to its wide geographical range. The species is protected in several areas including Addo Elephant National Park, Karoo National Park, Mountain Zebra National Park, Ndumo Game Reserve and Kruger National Park.

== Taxonomy ==
Uloborus planipedius was described by Eugène Simon in 1897 from Port Elizabeth. The species has not been revised and is known only from females, which have not been illustrated.
