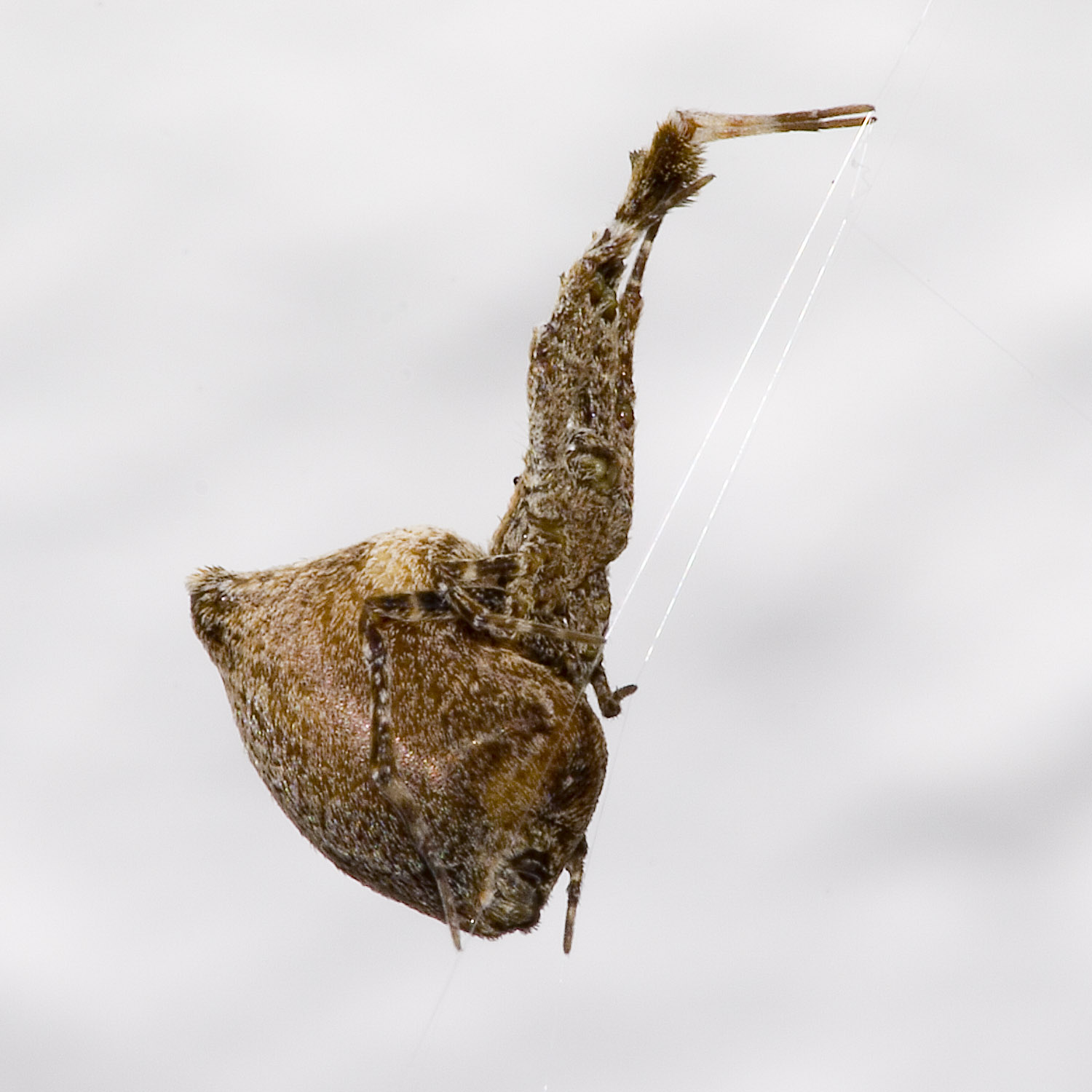
- Uloborus plumipes
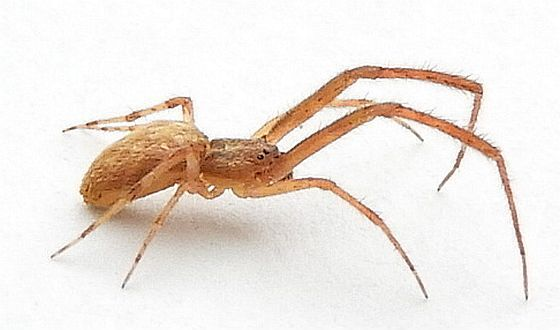
- Uloborus glomosus

Scientific classification
- Kingdom: Animalia
- Phylum: Arthropoda
- Subphylum: Chelicerata
- Class: Arachnida
- Order: Araneae
- Infraorder: Araneomorphae
- Family: Uloboridae
- Genus: Uloborus; Latreille, 1806

Species
- See text

Diversity
- 80 species

= Uloborus =

Genus of spiders

Uloborus is a spider genus in the family Uloboridae with 79 described species.

== Distribution ==
Most species occur in the tropics and subtropics, with only a few species in northern America and Europe.

== Life style ==
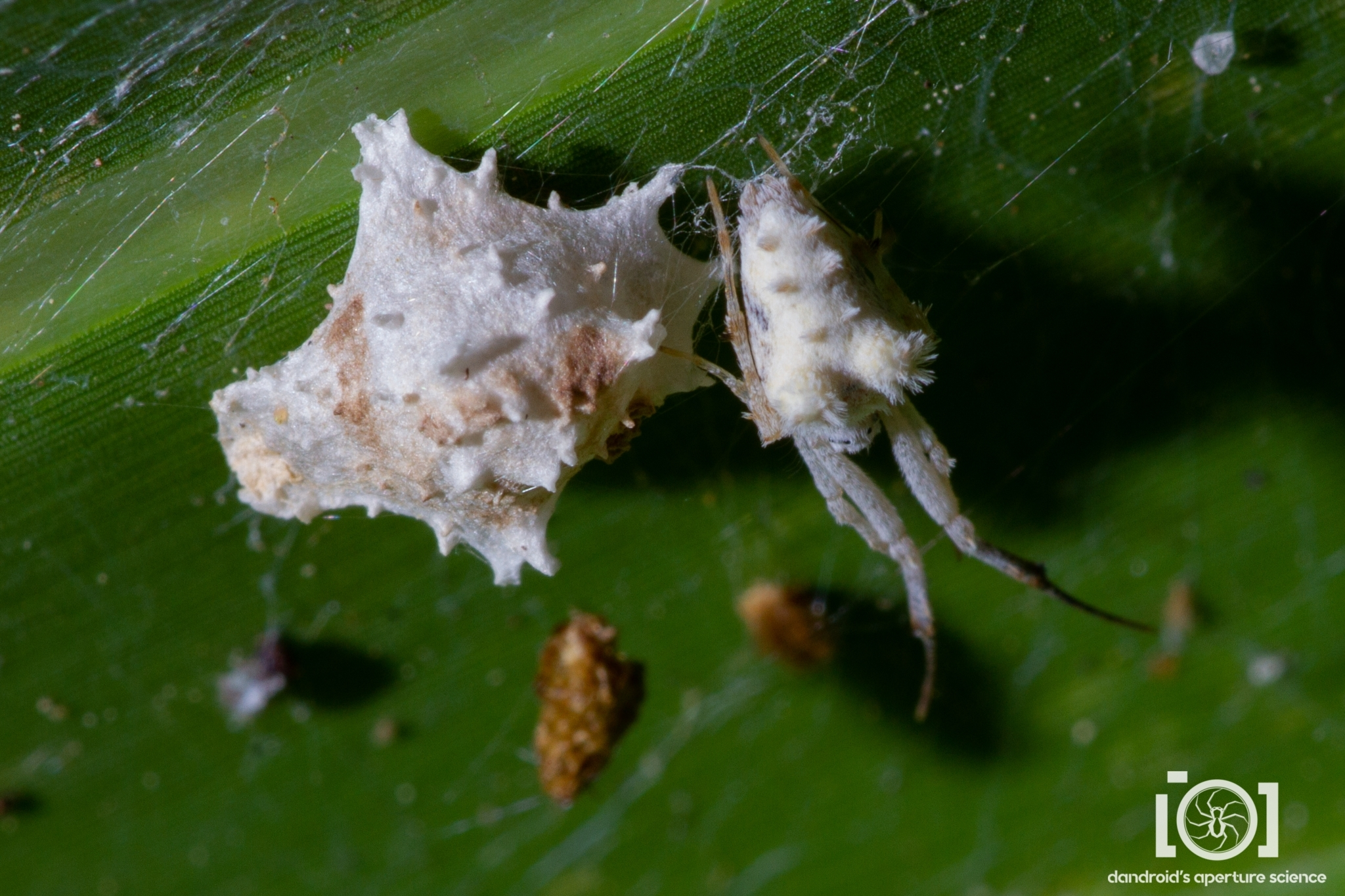
U. campestratus with egg sac

Uloborus spiders build small orb-webs with cribellate silk. The hub is often meshed or strengthened with a stabilimentum that varies in shape, with the most common configuration being a linear silk band.

The web is usually tugged forcefully as the spider approaches the prey to locate it and entangle it further. The first, and to a lesser extent the second legs, are used for tugging. The front legs are used to lightly touch the prey. Hanging from the first and second legs, the spider uses the fourth pair of legs to throw silk onto the prey to subdue it. The spider faces away from the prey while wrapping it. The silk entangles the thrashing limbs, preventing injury to the spider. They prey on a variety of flying insects.

Uloborids lack venom glands and use digestive enzymes that are poured onto the prey to kill them. The silk wrapped around the prey becomes transparent after absorbing some of the enzymes. Spiders are frequently seen with large prey masses in their mouths.

== Description ==
The chelicerae of these cribellate spiders are robust, but, like all Uloboridae, there are no venom glands. Eight small eyes are present.

The carapace is pear-shaped. The cephalic and thoracic regions of females are level, with the thoracic depression being a shallow pit. The cephalic region of males is curved slightly downward from the thoracic depression. The eight eyes are arranged in two rows and both eye rows are recurved.

The abdomen is longer than wide with 1-2 humps. The colour of the body is usually dull shades of cream, grey or brown, usually with markings.

Legs I and IV are longer than the other legs. The tibiae I have a brush of long setae in some species.

== Species ==
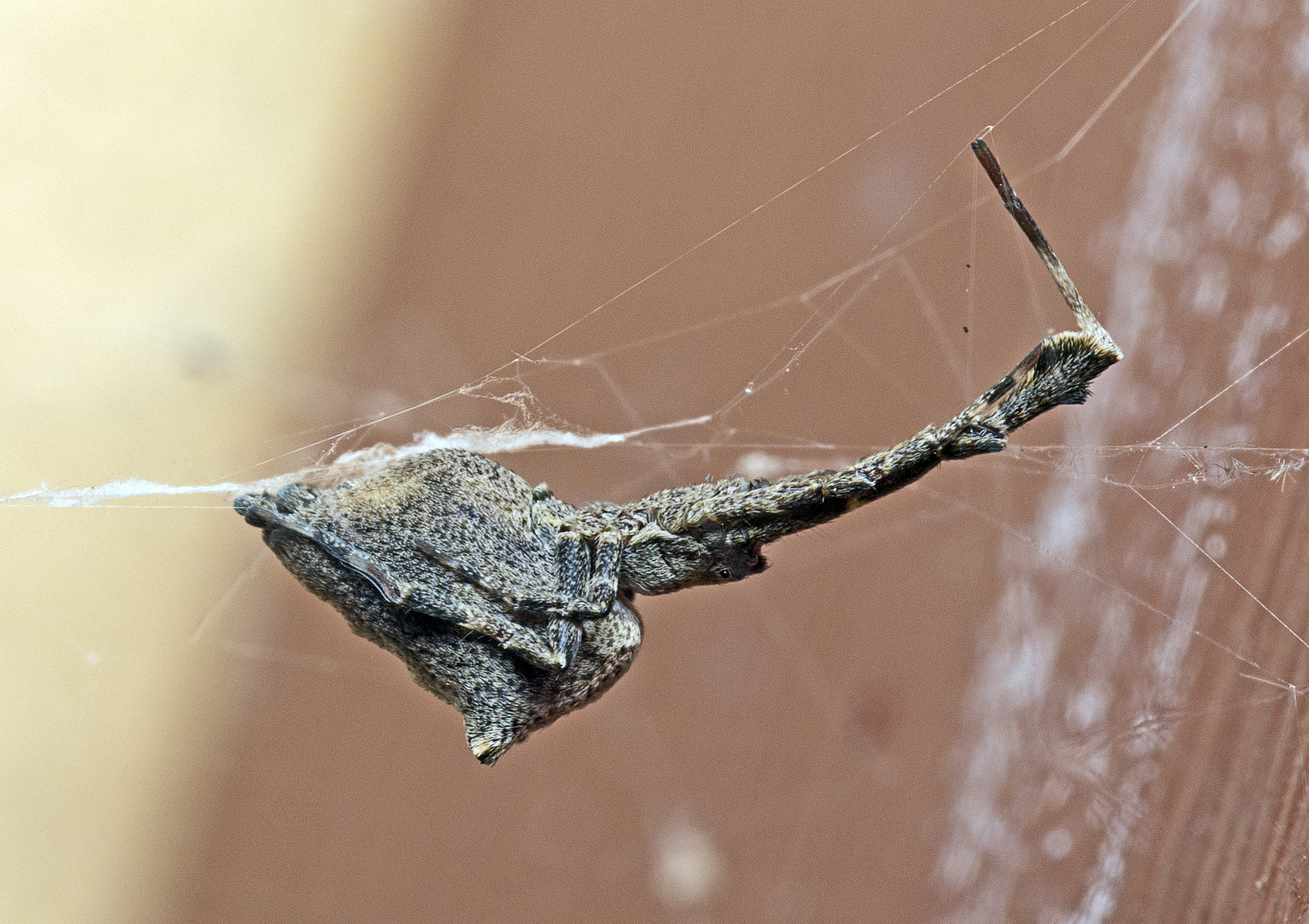
U. barbipes

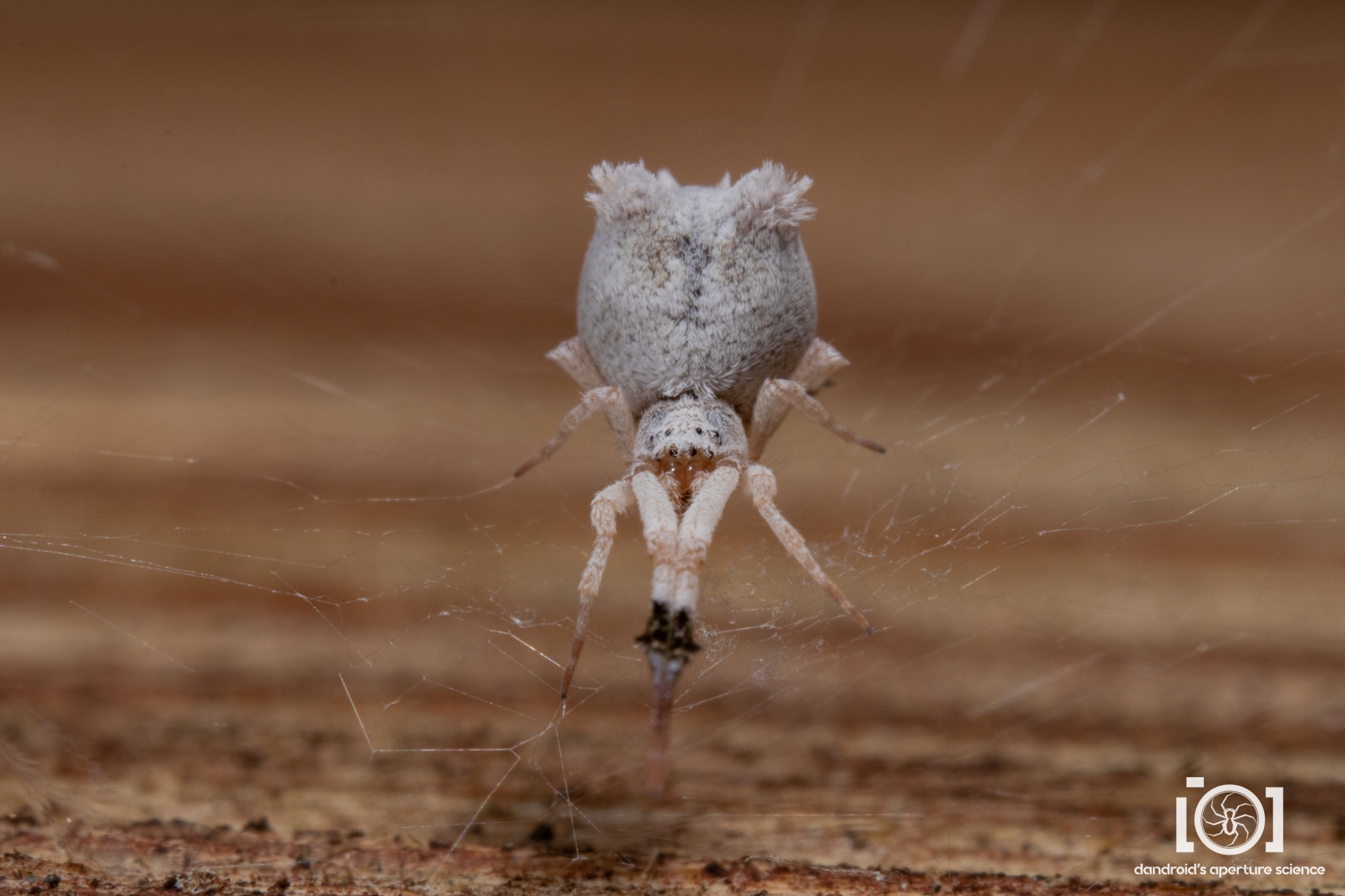
U. campestratus

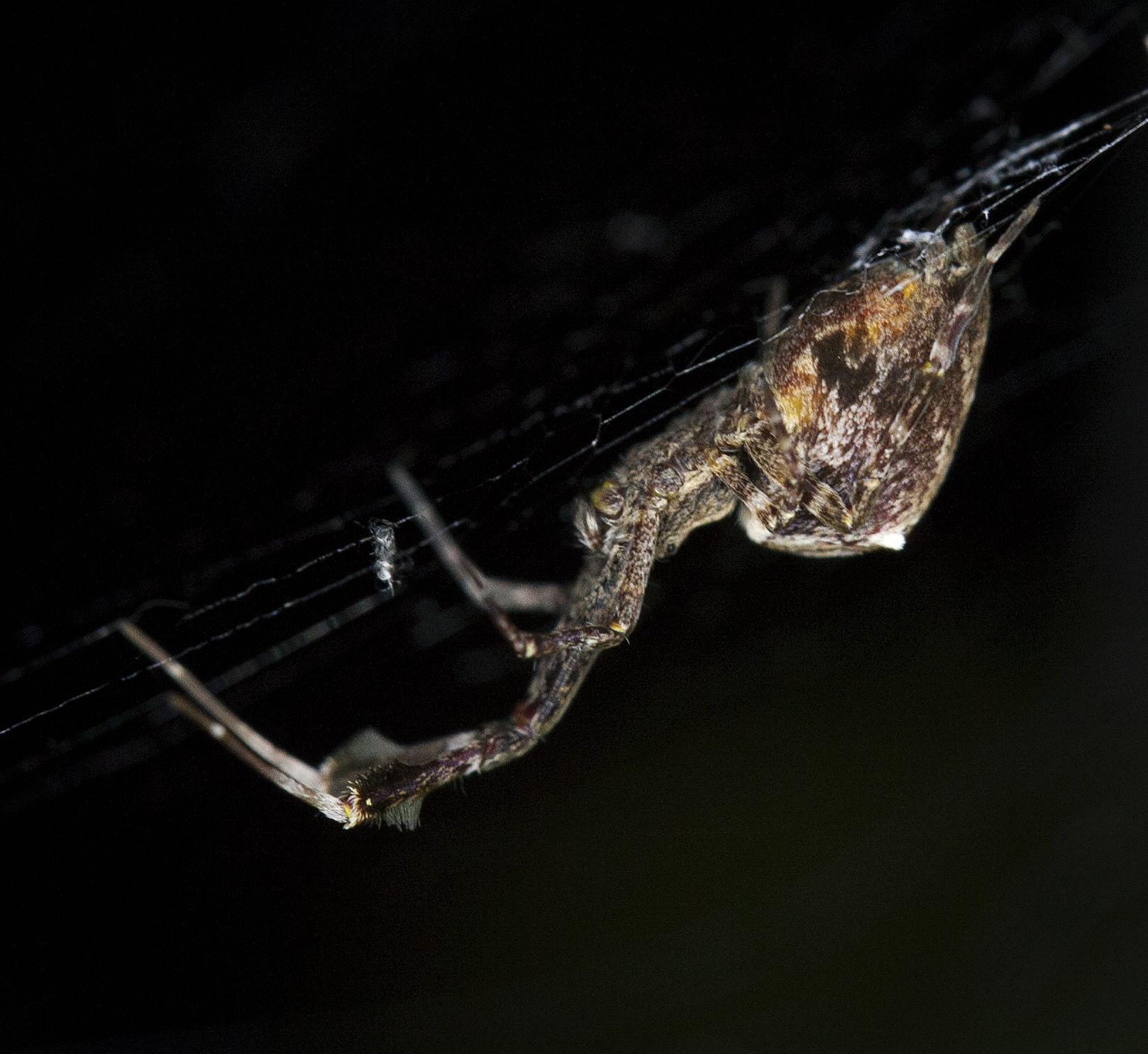
U. plumipes

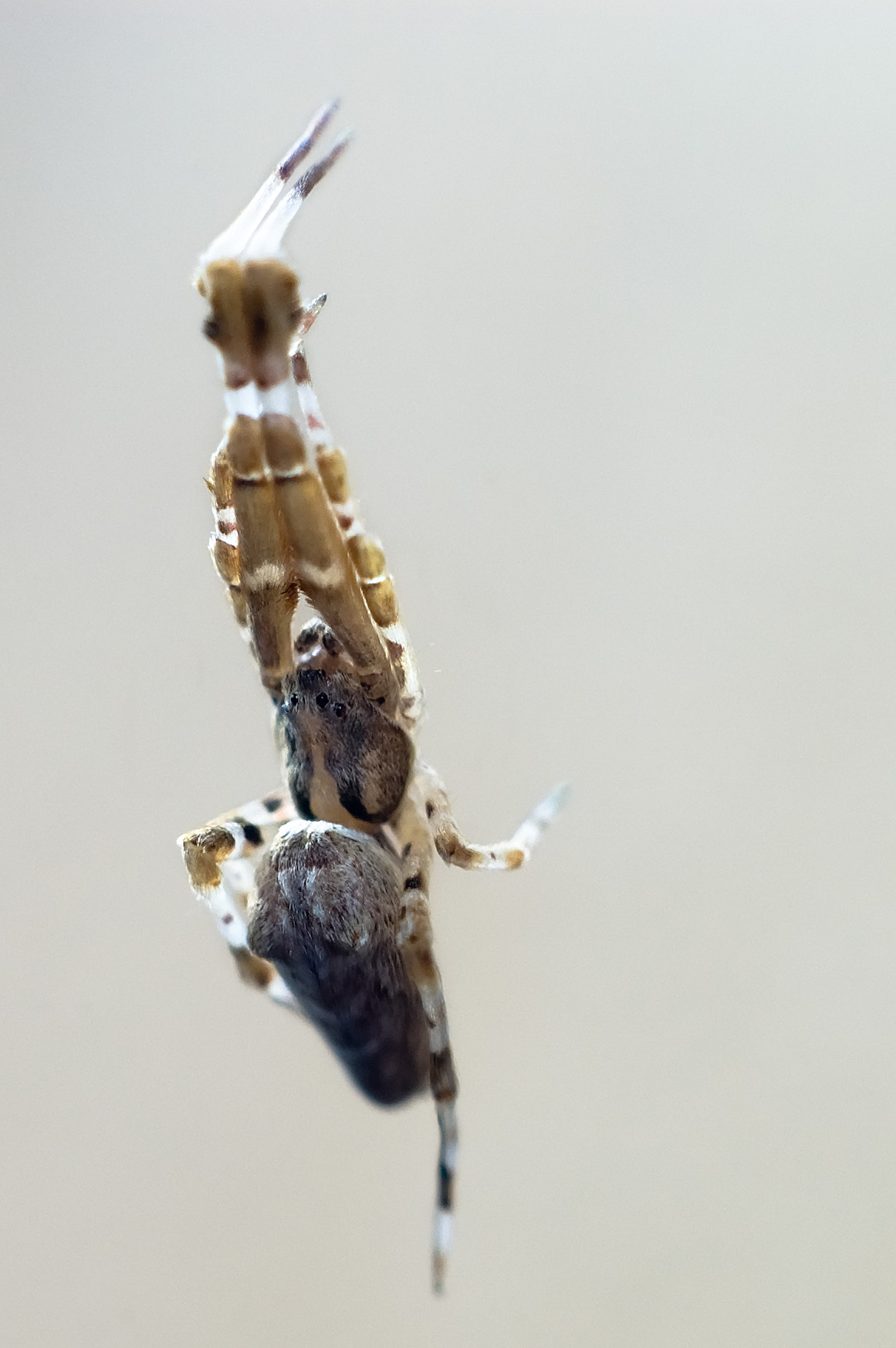
U. walckenaerius

As of October 2025, this genus includes 72 species and five subspecies:

- Uloborus albescens O. Pickard-Cambridge, 1885 – Pakistan, India
- Uloborus albofasciatus Chrysanthus, 1967 – New Guinea
- Uloborus albolineatus Mello-Leitão, 1941 – Argentina
- Uloborus ater Mello-Leitão, 1917 – Brazil
- Uloborus aureus Vinson, 1863 – Madagascar
- Uloborus barbipes L. Koch, 1872 – Australia (Queensland)
- Uloborus berlandi Roewer, 1951 – Guinea
- Uloborus biconicus Yin & Hu, 2012 – China
- Uloborus bigibbosus Simon, 1905 – India
- Uloborus bispiralis Opell, 1982 – New Guinea
- Uloborus campestratus Simon, 1893 – USA to Venezuela
- Uloborus canescens C. L. Koch, 1844 – Colombia
- Uloborus cellarius Yin & Yan, 2012 – China
- Uloborus chinmoyiae Biswas & Raychaudhuri, 2013 – Bangladesh
- Uloborus conus Opell, 1982 – New Guinea
- Uloborus crucifaciens Hingston, 1927 – Myanmar
- Uloborus cubicus (Thorell, 1898) – Myanmar
- Uloborus diversus Marx, 1898 – United States, Mexico
- Uloborus eberhardi Opell, 1981 – Costa Rica
- Uloborus elongatus Opell, 1982 – Argentina
- Uloborus emarginatus Kulczyński, 1908 – Indonesia (Java)
- Uloborus filidentatus Hingston, 1932 – Guyana
- Uloborus filifaciens Hingston, 1927 – India (Andaman Is.)
- Uloborus filinodatus Hingston, 1932 – Guyana
- Uloborus formosanus Yoshida, 2012 – Taiwan
- Uloborus formosus Marx, 1898 – Mexico
- Uloborus furunculus Simon, 1906 – India
- Uloborus gilvus (Blackwall, 1870) – Italy, Greece
- Uloborus glomosus (Walckenaer, 1841) – Canada, United States, Mexico
- Uloborus guangxiensis Zhu, Sha & Chen, 1989 – China
- Uloborus humeralis van Hasselt, 1882 – Myanmar, Indonesia (Sumatra, Java)
  - U. h. marginatus Kulczyński, 1908 – Indonesia (Java)
- Uloborus inaequalis Kulczyński, 1908 – New Guinea
- Uloborus jabalpurensis Bhandari & Gajbe, 2001 – India
- Uloborus jarrei Berland & Millot, 1940 – Guinea
- Uloborus kerevatensis Opell, 1991 – Papua New Guinea
- Uloborus khasiensis Tikader, 1969 – India
- Uloborus krishnae Tikader, 1970 – India (mainland, Nicobar Is.)
- Uloborus leucosagma Thorell, 1895 – Myanmar
- Uloborus limbatus Thorell, 1895 – Myanmar
- Uloborus llastay Grismado, 2002 – Argentina
- Uloborus lugubris (Thorell, 1895) – Myanmar
- Uloborus metae Opell, 1981 – Colombia
- Uloborus minutus Mello-Leitão, 1915 – Brazil
- Uloborus modestus Thorell, 1891 – India (Nicobar Is.)
- Uloborus montifer Marples, 1955 – Samoa
- Uloborus niger Mello-Leitão, 1917 – Brazil
- Uloborus oculatus Kulczyński, 1908 – Singapore
- Uloborus parvulus Schmidt, 1976 – Canary Islands
- Uloborus penicillatoides Xie, Peng, Zhang, Gong & Kim, 1997 – China
- Uloborus pictus Thorell, 1898 – Myanmar
- Uloborus pinnipes Thorell, 1877 – Indonesia (Sulawesi)
- Uloborus planipedius Simon, 1897 – South Africa
- Uloborus plumipes Lucas, 1846 – Europe, Africa, Yemen, Iran, Pakistan. Introduced to Argentina, Philippines, Japan
  - U. p. javanus Kulczyński, 1908 – Indonesia (Java)
- Uloborus pteropus (Thorell, 1887) – Myanmar
- Uloborus rufus Schmidt & Krause, 1995 – Cape Verde
- Uloborus scutifaciens Hingston, 1927 – Myanmar
- Uloborus segregatus Gertsch, 1936 – USA to Colombia, Galapagos
- Uloborus sexfasciatus Simon, 1893 – Philippines
- Uloborus shendurneyensis Asima, Sudhikumar & Prasad, 2021 – India
- Uloborus spelaeus Bristowe, 1952 – Malaysia
- Uloborus strandi (Caporiacco, 1940) – Ethiopia
- Uloborus tenuissimus L. Koch, 1872 – Samoa
- Uloborus tetramaculatus Mello-Leitão, 1940 – Brazil
- Uloborus trifasciatus Thorell, 1890 – Indonesia (Sunda Is.)
- Uloborus trilineatus Keyserling, 1883 – Mexico to Argentina
- Uloborus umboniger Kulczyński, 1908 – Sri Lanka
- Uloborus undulatus Thorell, 1878 – Indonesia, (Java)
  - U. u. indicus Kulczyński, 1908 – Malaysia
  - U. u. obscurior Kulczyński, 1908 – New Guinea
  - U. u. pallidior Kulczyński, 1908 – Indonesia, (Java)
- Uloborus vanillarum Vinson, 1863 – Madagascar
- Uloborus velutinus Butler, 1883 – Madagascar
- Uloborus villosus Keyserling, 1881 – Colombia
- Uloborus viridimicans Simon, 1893 – Philippines
- Uloborus walckenaerius Latreille, 1806 – Madeira, Europe, Turkey, Caucasus, Russia (Europe to Far East), Iraq, Iran, Kazakhstan, Central Asia, China, Korea, Japan. Introduced to Cape Verde, St. Helena, South Africa (type species)
