= Uloborus gilvus =

Scientific classification
- Kingdom: Animalia
- Phylum: Arthropoda
- Subphylum: Chelicerata
- Class: Arachnida
- Order: Araneae
- Infraorder: Araneomorphae
- Family: Uloboridae
- Genus: Uloborus
- Species: U. gilvus

Binomial name
- Uloborus gilvus (Blackwall, 1870)

Species of spider

Uloborus gilvus is a spider species found in Italy and Greece.
