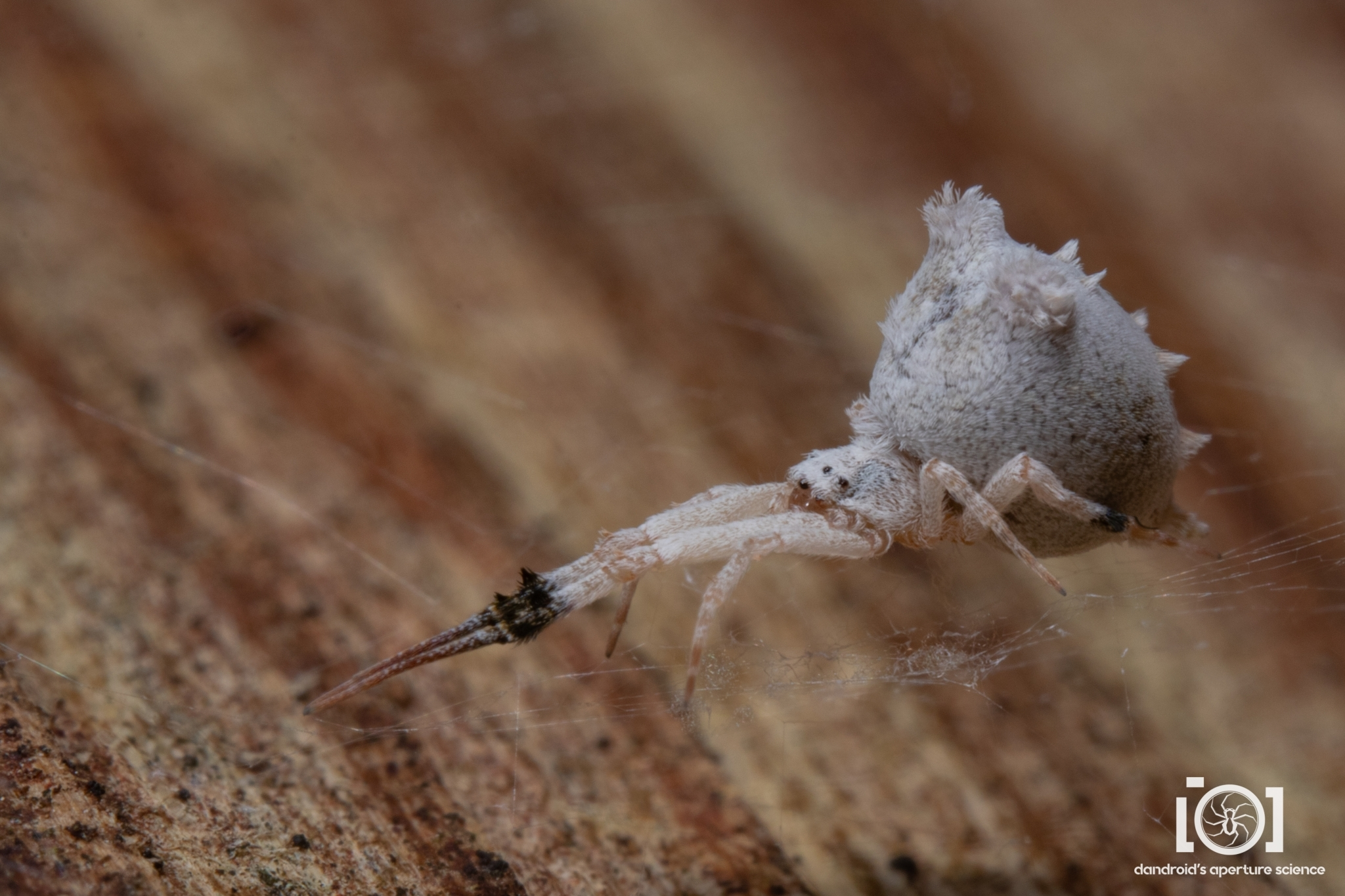

Scientific classification
- Kingdom: Animalia
- Phylum: Arthropoda
- Subphylum: Chelicerata
- Class: Arachnida
- Order: Araneae
- Infraorder: Araneomorphae
- Family: Uloboridae
- Genus: Uloborus
- Species: U. campestratus

Binomial name
- Uloborus campestratus Simon, 1893

= Uloborus campestratus =

Species of spider

Uloborus campestratus is a species of cribellate orb weaver in the spider family Uloboridae. It is found in a range from the United States to Venezuela.
