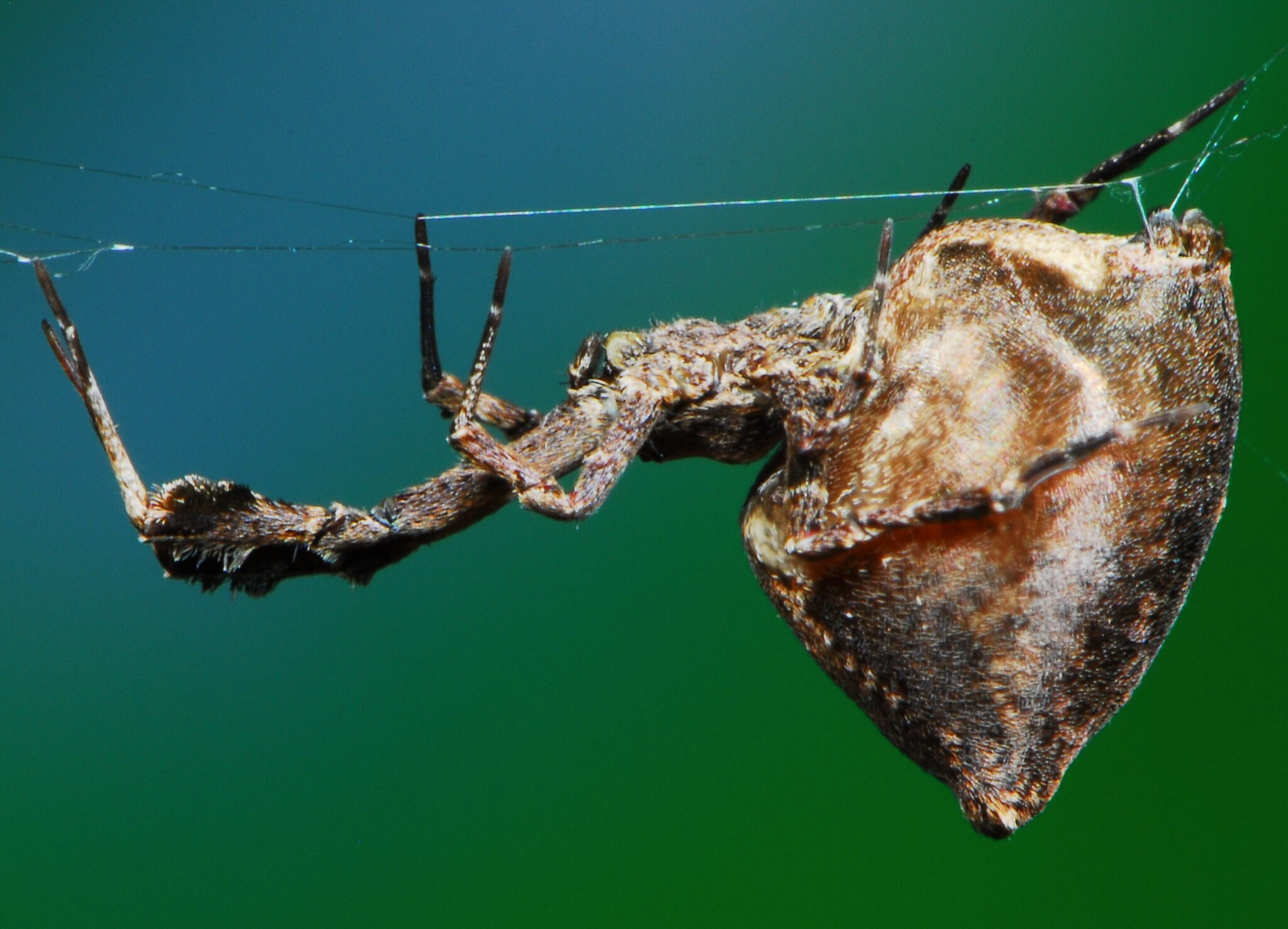
- Female
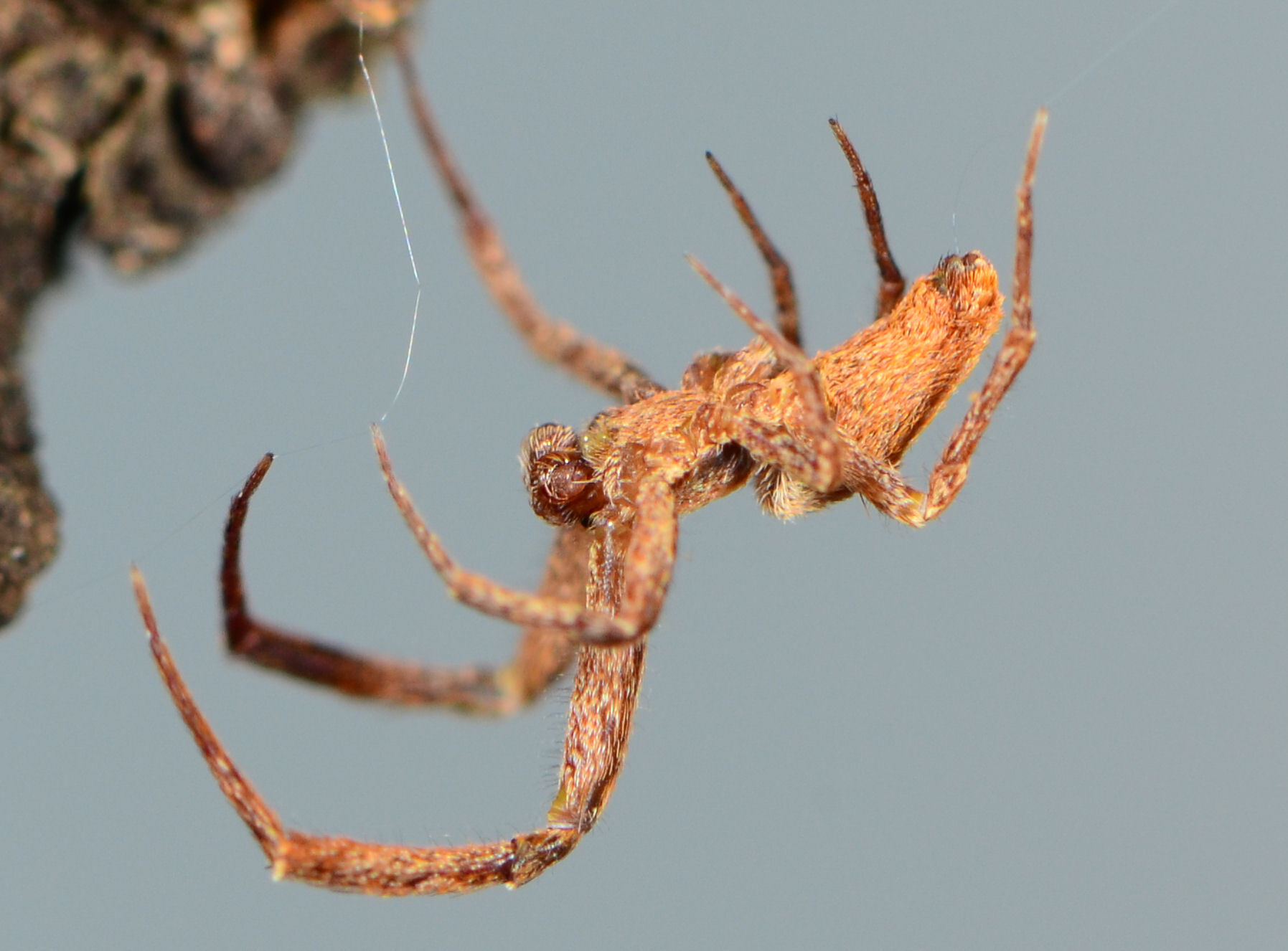
- Male

Scientific classification
- Kingdom: Animalia
- Phylum: Arthropoda
- Subphylum: Chelicerata
- Class: Arachnida
- Order: Araneae
- Infraorder: Araneomorphae
- Family: Uloboridae
- Genus: Uloborus
- Species: U. plumipes

Binomial name
- Uloborus plumipes Lucas, 1846
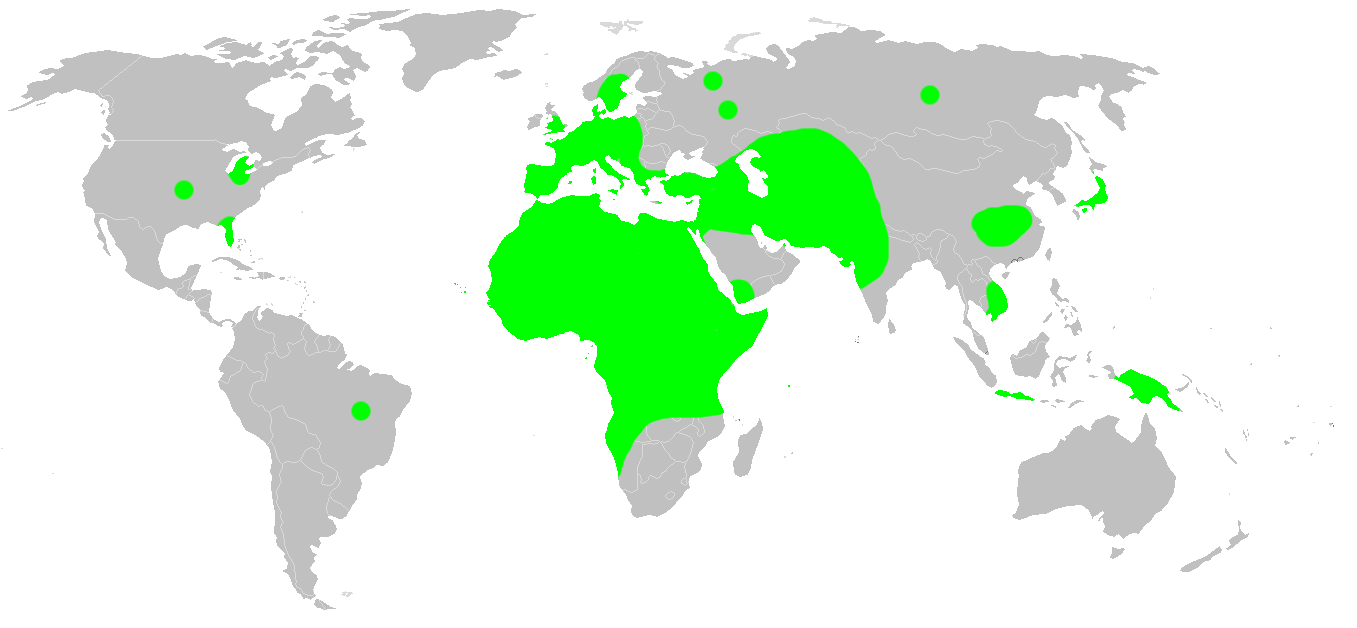

Synonyms
- Uloborus costae Thorell, 1858; Orithya gnava Blackwall, 1865; Uloborus signatus O. Pickard-Cambridge, 1876; Orithya gnavus Blackwall, 1877; Uloborus niloticus Simon, 1884; Uloborus pictiventris Simon, 1890; Uloborus niveivestis Simon, 1893; Uloborus gnavus Lehtinen, 1967

= Uloborus plumipes =

Garden center spider

Species of spider

Uloborus plumipes is a species of Old World cribellate spider in the family Uloboridae. Common names include the feather-legged lace weaver and the garden centre spider, the latter name being due to its frequent occurrence of this spider in garden centres. The species name is derived from the Latin pluma "feather" and pes "foot".

Females grow up to 10 mm. They lack venom glands, and are therefore non-venomous. A stabilimentum is sometimes present. Pattern and colouration is quite variable. In contrast to Uloborus walckenaerius, it has distinct tufts of hairs on the front legs. They are well-camouflaged as they hang upside down motionlessly in their horizontal webs. Young spiders look like dead insects and are thus hard to find on a web. The empty egg sac can often be seen attached to house plants. It is flattish, papery and brown and about 0.5 cm long, with the shape of a dried holly leaf.

== Distribution and habitat ==
Uloborus plumipes has a widespread distribution throughout the Old World and has been introduced to Argentina and the Philippines.

It originated from warmer parts of the Old World where its typical habitat is on the trunk or among dead twigs and branches of trees. It has spread to the Netherlands, Belgium and other parts of Europe where it is found in heated greenhouses. It was first recorded in the United Kingdom in 1992 and has since spread to many areas particularly in the south and east. It is often known as the garden centre spider because it is found on houseplants growing in hothouses in garden centres and is able to survive the winter in greenhouses that are heated to maintain a temperature well above freezing point. It may perform a useful function in helping to control whitefly.

== Behaviour ==
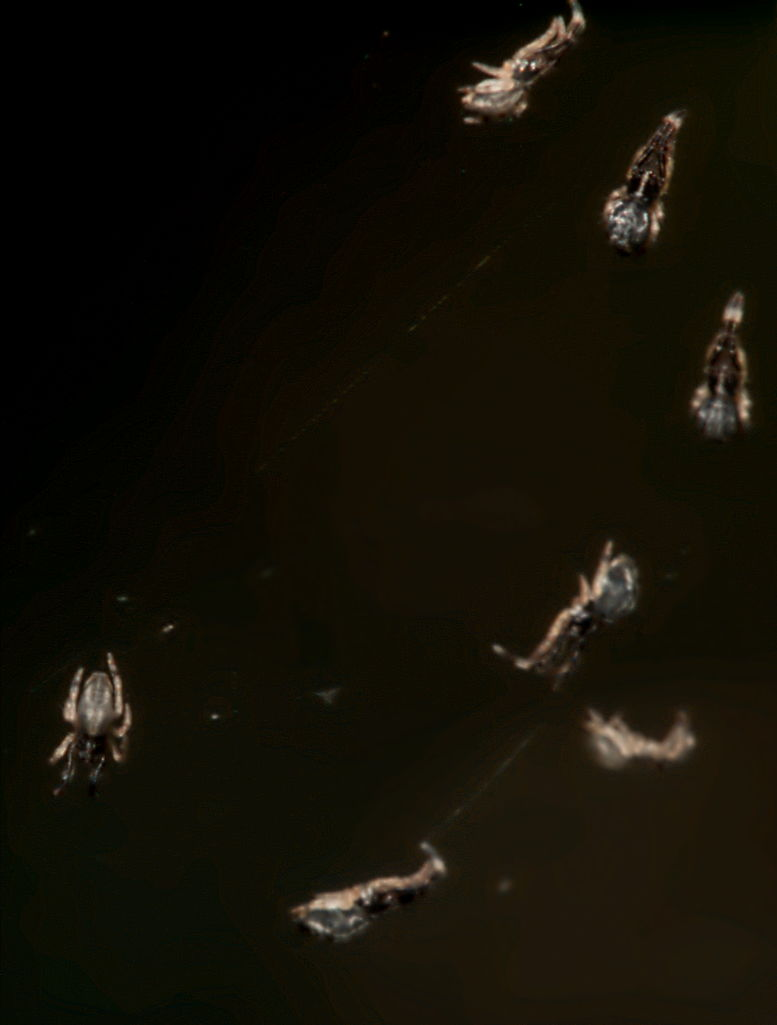
Spiderlings on a web

Uloborus plumipes is a cribellate spider with a cribellum, a silk spinning organ which consists of one or more plates covered in thousands of tiny spigots. The fine fibres produced are combined by comblike bristles on the hind legs into slender silk threads with a fuzzy texture that are able to trap prey without the use of glue.

This spider is an expert in camouflage and very much resembles a bit of dead bark or other piece of detritus as it dangles from its web. It is normally found on dead branches, among dead twigs or under the eaves of a house. It hangs inertly in the centre of the small, horizontal web it has spun with its legs in line with its body. The web often looks bedraggled with broken strands and the whole effect is of an ancient, abandoned cobweb with a scrap of dead plant material adhering to it. The eggs are concealed in silk egg sacs which are also suspended from the web. The female spider closely resembles these as she dangles nearby. The American naturalist Elizabeth Peckham describes how she attempted to take down a small web with eleven apparent cocoons suspended from it, only to find one of these inert objects springing to activity as the female revealed her presence on the web.

Female feather-legged spiders compete for possession of webs and communicate their intentions through thread pulling and shaking the occupied web. These interactions can lead to physical altercations between females.

== Description ==
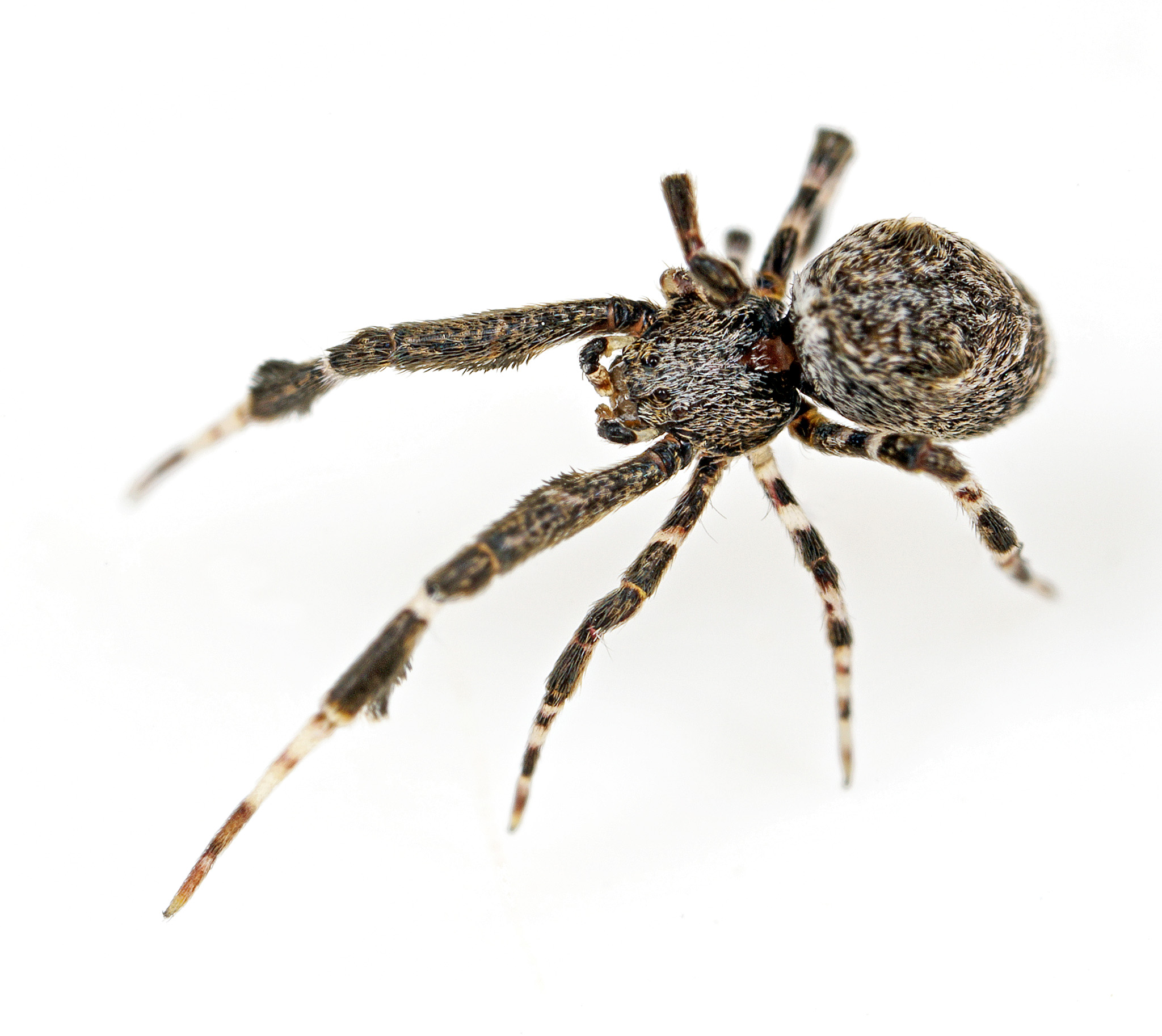

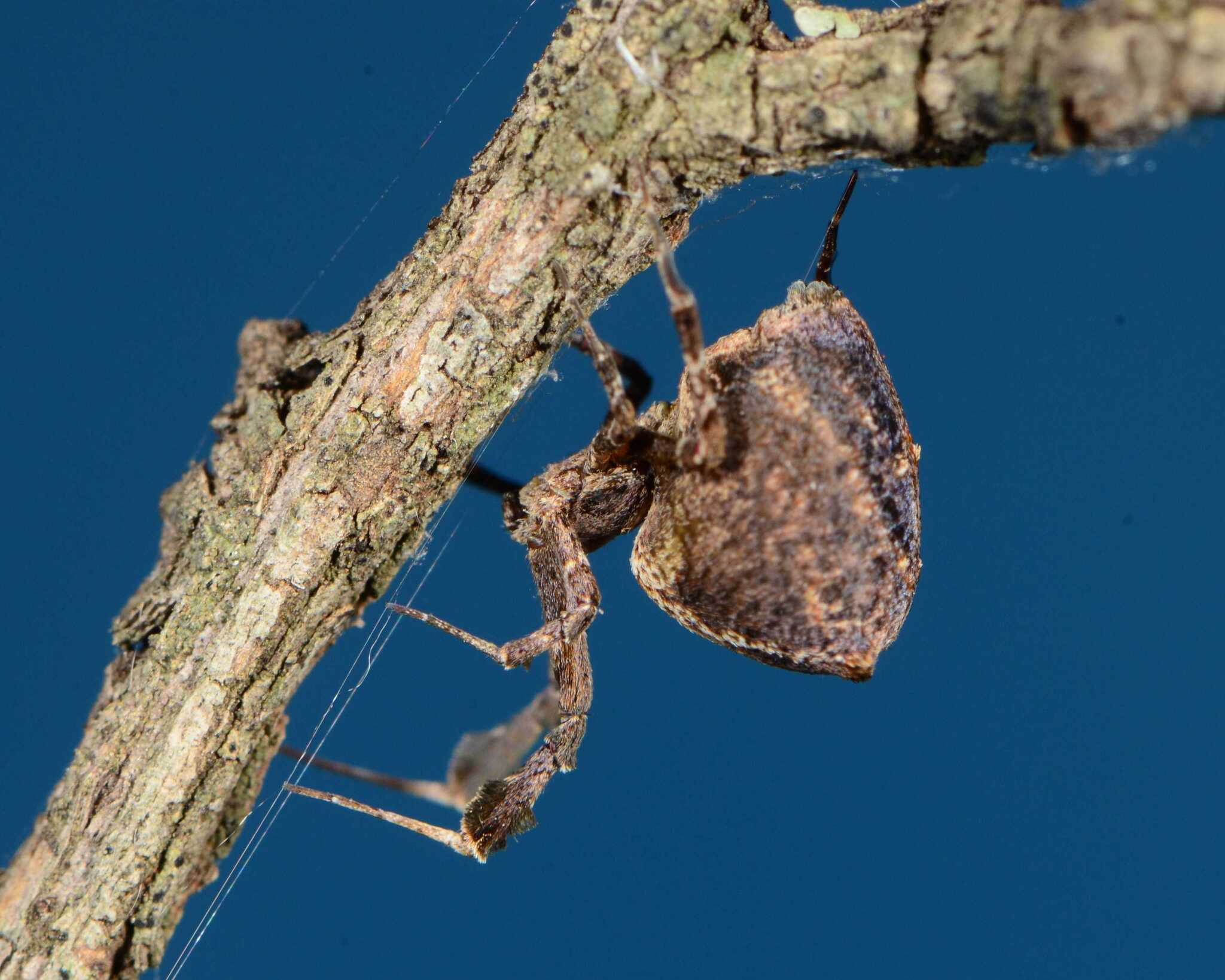
female

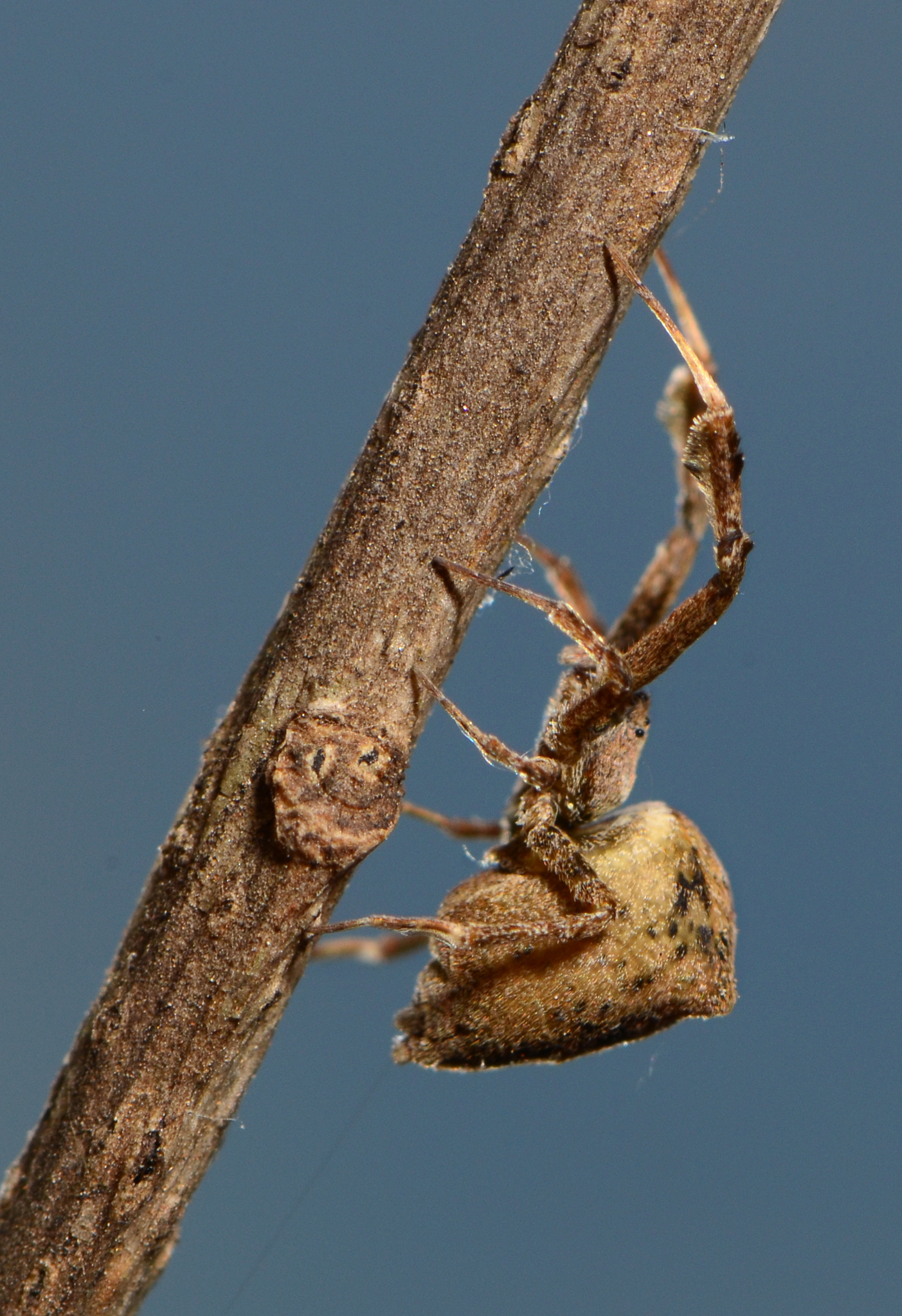
female

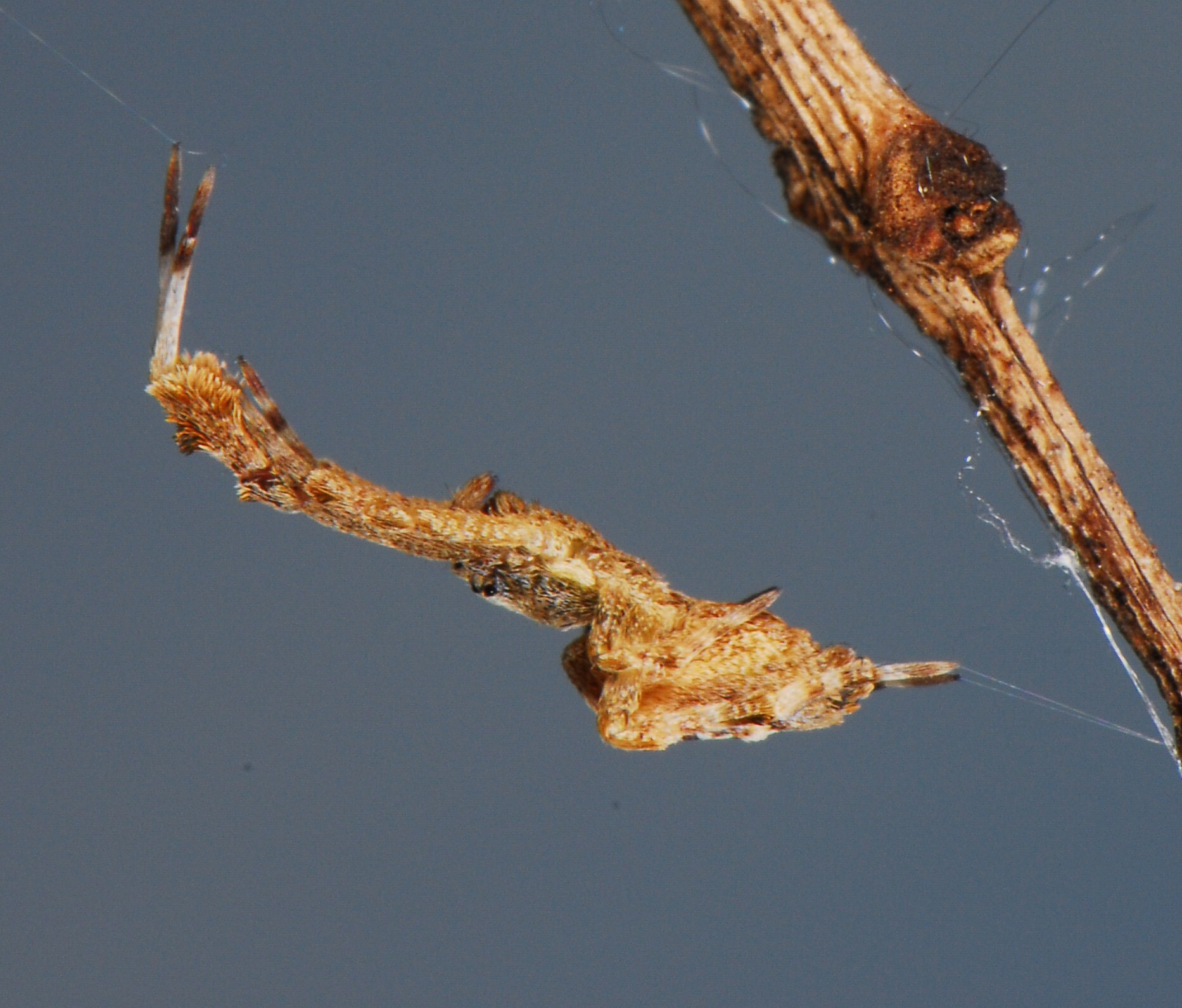
juvenile female

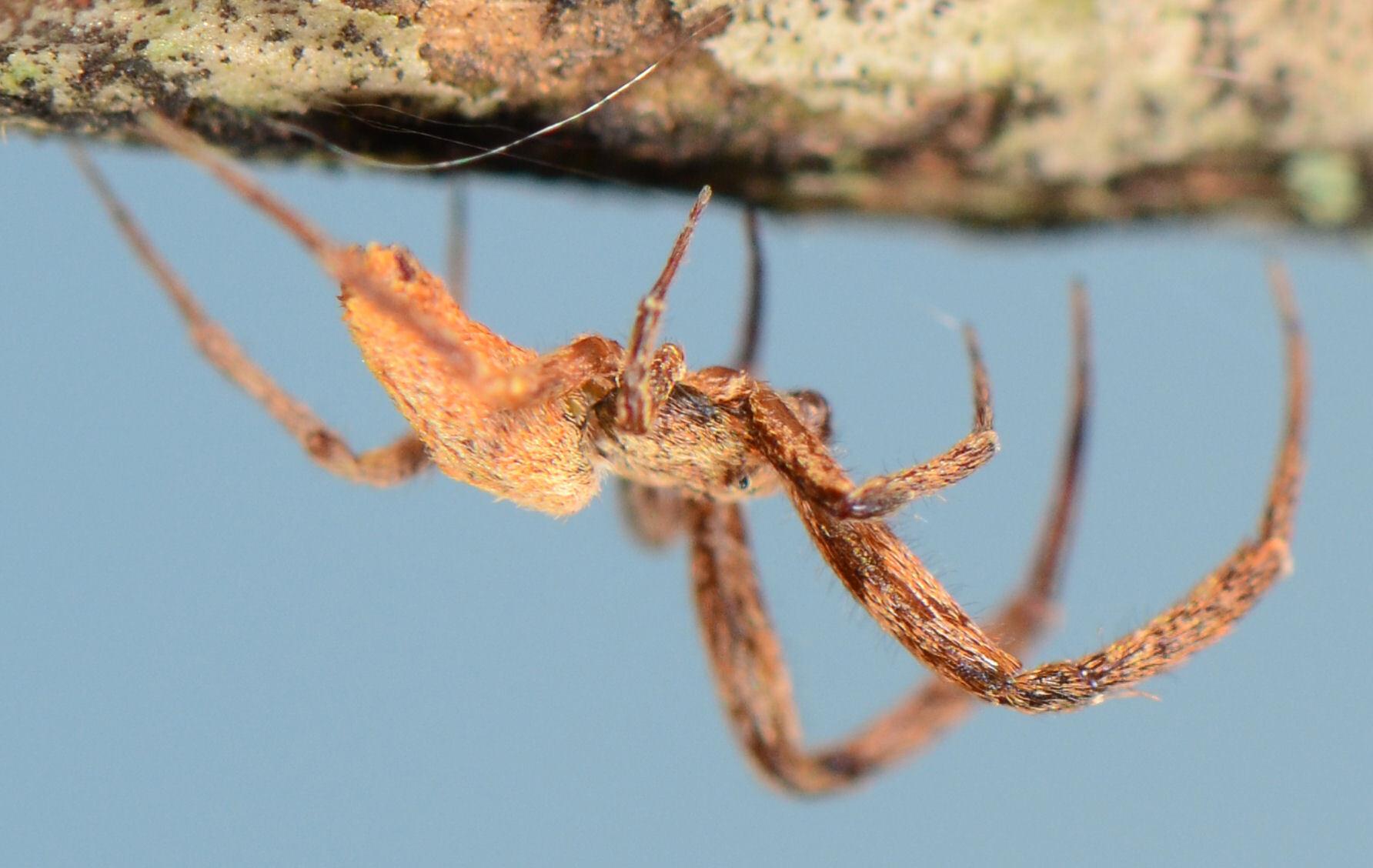
male

Uloborus plumipes is a small spider with adult females growing to a length of about 6 mm (0.2 in). The abdomen is truncated and patterned with various irregular tubercles and granulations. The front pair of legs are uneven in appearance with the tibia clothed in dense hairs while the naked terminal segments are very slender. The colour is some shade of greyish-brown mottled with white specks.
