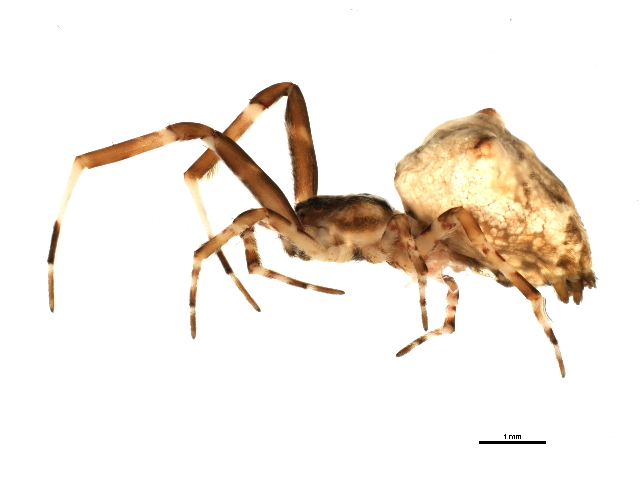
- U. diversus, adult female

Scientific classification
- Kingdom: Animalia
- Phylum: Arthropoda
- Subphylum: Chelicerata
- Class: Arachnida
- Order: Araneae
- Infraorder: Araneomorphae
- Family: Uloboridae
- Genus: Uloborus
- Species: U. diversus

Binomial name
- Uloborus diversus Marx, 1898

Synonyms
- U. albineus (Marx, 1898); U. californicus (Banks, 1904); U. utahensis (Chamberlin, 1919); U. saphes (Chamberlin, 1924); U. crepedinis (Chamberlin, 1924)

= Uloborus diversus =

Species of spider

Uloborus diversus is a species of cribellate orb weaver in the spider family Uloboridae. It is found in the desert regions of the Southwestern United States and Mexico. It is an important model species for understanding the evolution of spidroins and understanding orb-weaving behavior. To provide resources for this research a 2.15-Gbp chromosome-level draft genome assembly was sequenced and assembled to 10 chromosomes.

== Description ==
U. diversus is typically brown, with paler colourations more common than melanic ones. Patterns and markings vary, though most individuals have a mottled line that runs longitudinally down the abdomen. Leg markings are distinct, with visible rings.

U. diversus shows minor sexual dimorphism, with males sporting tibial spines and a slightly flattened abdomen.

== Taxonomy ==
Due to the great variability in appearance of U. diversus, many junior synonyms exist for this species.
