= A. nuda =

A. nuda may refer to:

- Aaptos nuda, a sea sponge
- Achroosia nuda, a Brazilian moth
- Agrotis nuda, a synonym of Agrotis bilitura, commonly called the potato cutworm, a South American moth
- Alcadia nuda, a Cuban land snail
- Andrena nuda, commonly called the naked miner bee, a North American bee
- Anomoeotes nuda, an African moth
- Apostasia nuda, an orchid
- Astroboa nuda, a basket star
- Astrophytum nuda, a synonym of Astrophytum myriostigma, a Mexican cactus
- Avena nuda, commonly called the hulless oat or naked oat
