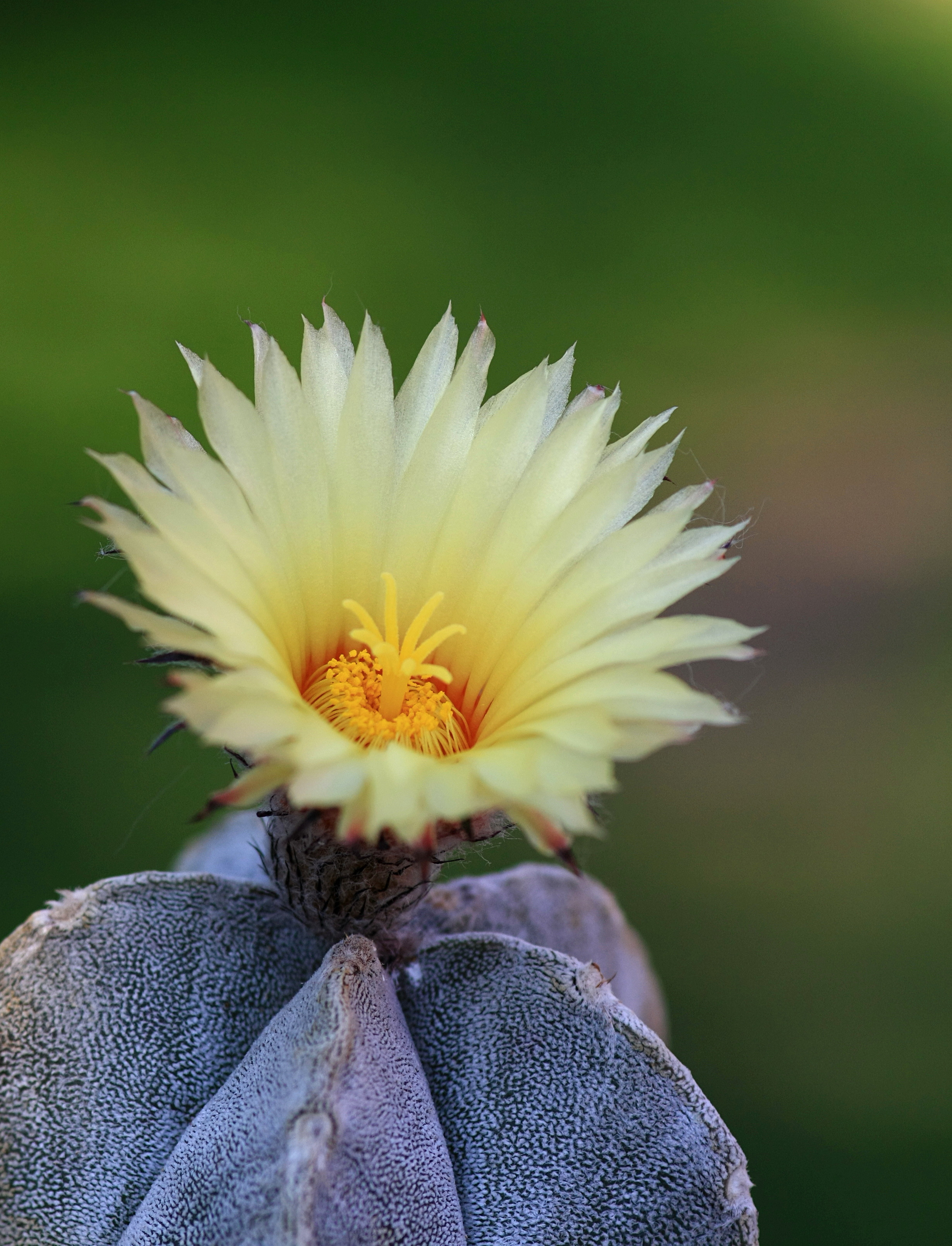

Conservation status
- Vulnerable (IUCN 3.1)

Scientific classification
- Kingdom: Plantae
- Clade: Tracheophytes
- Clade: Angiosperms
- Clade: Eudicots
- Order: Caryophyllales
- Family: Cactaceae
- Subfamily: Cactoideae
- Genus: Astrophytum
- Species: A. coahuilense

Binomial name
- Astrophytum coahuilense (H.Moeller) Kanfer

= Astrophytum coahuilense =

Species of cactus

Astrophytum coahuilense is a cactus species belonging to the genus Astrophytum.

== Taxonomy ==
The species was originally described as a subspecies of Echinocactus myriostigma (now Astrophytum myriostigma), before later being considered synonymous with A. myriostigma. Morphological comparisons done in 2005 by David Hunt, as well as genetic testing performed in 2016, supported classifying A. coahuilense as a separate species. The 2016 genetic testing, performed using Bayesian Evolutionary Analysis Sampling, found that A. coahuilense may have diverged from a common ancestor with A. capricorne around 3.3 million years ago during the Pliocene.

A morphological study performed in 2024 found results that supported the hypothesis that the species may have resulted from an ancient hybridization between A. myriostigma and A. capricorne.

== Description ==
A. coahuilense may be confused with Astrophytum myriostigma, as the two looks similar to each other. A. coahuilense possesses a five-ribbed structure, albeit the epidermis is more covered in softer trichomes compared to A. myriostigma. It grows up to a size of 10 cm (occasionally 20 cm). The flowers are yellow with a characteristic red throat, although can appear pure red or very rarely pure yellow. In the fruit which is red till olive-green colored and basal opening are up to 200 seeds, similar as in the case of A. capricorne.

== Distribution and habitat ==
A. coahuilense is native to Mexico, specifically the south-western regions of Coahuila and Durango. They inhabit preferentially sunny south and east slopes on lime formations (limestone hills) located in xerophytic shrubland, rarely growing in the north or west position between white grey rock in a loose to thick vegetation, which primarily consists of a dry bush community. The soil consists mainly of lime gravel and sand with isolated humus feedthroughs.

The species is known from three severely fragmented localities, with an extent of occurrence of just under 6000 km². In each location there is reportedly only a few plants, though at the hill of Las Palmas, Durango the species reportedly is found at a density of 1000 per 10 hectares.

== Conservation ==
=== Threats ===
The species is listed as Vulnerable on the IUCN Red List, with the last assessment being performed in 2009. The main threats to the species were identified as illegal harvesting and overgrazing of the area by livestock, particularly goats.
