= Thermochrous melanoneura =

Scientific classification
- Kingdom: Animalia
- Phylum: Arthropoda
- Class: Insecta
- Order: Lepidoptera
- Family: Anomoeotidae
- Genus: Thermochrous
- Species: T. melanoneura

Binomial name
- Thermochrous melanoneura Hampson, 1920

Species of moth

Thermochrous melanoneura is a species of moth of the Anomoeotidae family. It is found in Malawi.
