= Thermochrous neurophaea =

Scientific classification
- Kingdom: Animalia
- Phylum: Arthropoda
- Class: Insecta
- Order: Lepidoptera
- Family: Anomoeotidae
- Genus: Thermochrous
- Species: T. neurophaea

Binomial name
- Thermochrous neurophaea Hering, 1928

Species of moth

Thermochrous neurophaea is a species of moth of the Anomoeotidae family, discovered by Erich Martin Hering in 1928. It is found in Tanzania.
