= Anomoeotes diaphana =

Scientific classification
- Kingdom: Animalia
- Phylum: Arthropoda
- Class: Insecta
- Order: Lepidoptera
- Family: Anomoeotidae
- Genus: Anomoeotes
- Species: A. diaphana

Binomial name
- Anomoeotes diaphana Hering, 1932

Species of moth

Anomoeotes diaphana is a species of moth of the Anomoeotidae family. It is known from the Democratic Republic of the Congo.
