= Anomoeotes elegans =

Scientific classification
- Domain: Eukaryota
- Kingdom: Animalia
- Phylum: Arthropoda
- Class: Insecta
- Order: Lepidoptera
- Family: Anomoeotidae
- Genus: Anomoeotes
- Species: A. elegans

Binomial name
- Anomoeotes elegans Pagenstecher, 1903

Species of moth

Anomoeotes elegans is a species of moth of the Anomoeotidae family. It is known from Kenya.
