= Anomoeotes infuscata =

Scientific classification
- Domain: Eukaryota
- Kingdom: Animalia
- Phylum: Arthropoda
- Class: Insecta
- Order: Lepidoptera
- Family: Anomoeotidae
- Genus: Anomoeotes
- Species: A. infuscata

Binomial name
- Anomoeotes infuscata Talbot, 1929

Species of moth

Anomoeotes infuscata is a species of moth of the Anomoeotidae family. It is known from Angola.
