= Thermochrous marginata =

Scientific classification
- Kingdom: Animalia
- Phylum: Arthropoda
- Class: Insecta
- Order: Lepidoptera
- Family: Anomoeotidae
- Genus: Thermochrous
- Species: T. marginata

Binomial name
- Thermochrous marginata Talbot, 1929

Species of moth

Thermochrous marginata is a species of moth of the Anomoeotidae family. It is found in Angola.
