= Dianeura jacksoni =

Scientific classification
- Kingdom: Animalia
- Phylum: Arthropoda
- Clade: Pancrustacea
- Class: Insecta
- Order: Lepidoptera
- Family: Anomoeotidae
- Genus: Dianeura
- Species: D. jacksoni

Binomial name
- Dianeura jacksoni Butler, 1888

Synonyms
- Plethoneura aperta Bryk, 1913; Dianeura aperta

Species of moth

Dianeura jacksoni is a species of moth of the Anomoeotidae family. It was described from Manda Island in Kenya.

The wingspan is 22–31 mm.
