= Thermochrous exigua =

Scientific classification
- Kingdom: Animalia
- Phylum: Arthropoda
- Class: Insecta
- Order: Lepidoptera
- Family: Anomoeotidae
- Genus: Thermochrous
- Species: T. exigua

Binomial name
- Thermochrous exigua Talbot, 1932

Species of moth

Thermochrous exigua is a species of moth of the Anomoeotidae family. It is found in Malawi.
