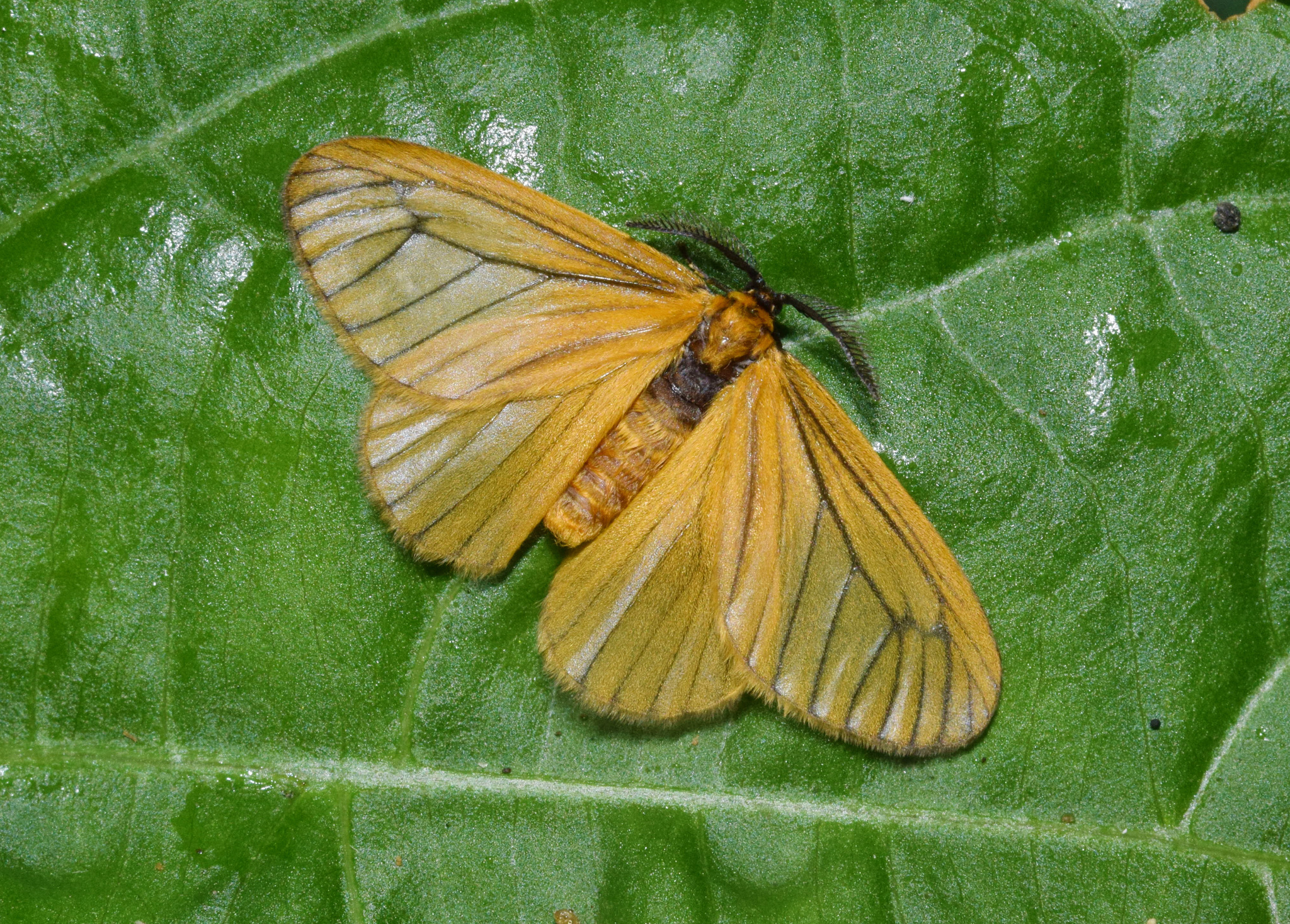
- Adult
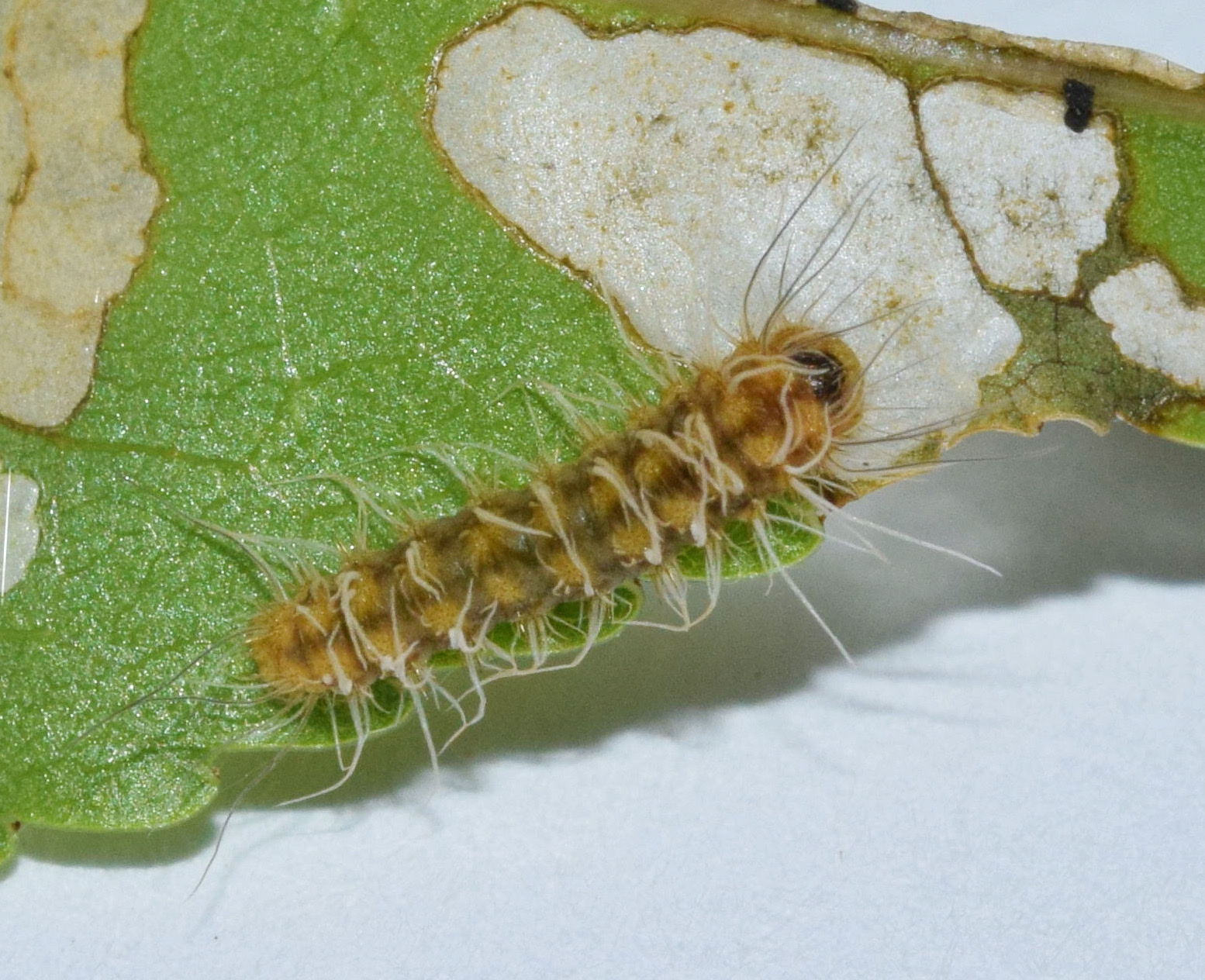
- Larvae

Scientific classification
- Kingdom: Animalia
- Phylum: Arthropoda
- Class: Insecta
- Order: Lepidoptera
- Family: Anomoeotidae
- Genus: Anomoeotes
- Species: A. nigrivenosus

Binomial name
- Anomoeotes nigrivenosus Butler, 1893

= Anomoeotes nigrivenosus =

Species of moth

Anomoeotes nigrivenosus is a species of moth of the Anomoeotidae family. It is known from the Democratic Republic of the Congo and South Africa.
