= Thermochrous succisa =

Scientific classification
- Kingdom: Animalia
- Phylum: Arthropoda
- Class: Insecta
- Order: Lepidoptera
- Family: Anomoeotidae
- Genus: Thermochrous
- Species: T. succisa

Binomial name
- Thermochrous succisa Hering, 1937

Species of moth

Thermochrous succisa is a species of moth of the Anomoeotidae family. It is found in the Democratic Republic of the Congo.
