= Anomoeotes nox =

Scientific classification
- Kingdom: Animalia
- Phylum: Arthropoda
- Class: Insecta
- Order: Lepidoptera
- Family: Anomoeotidae
- Genus: Anomoeotes
- Species: A. nox

Binomial name
- Anomoeotes nox Aurivillius, 1907

Species of moth

Anomoeotes nox is a species of moth of the Anomoeotidae family. It is known from the Republic of the Congo.
