= Anomoeotes separatula =

Scientific classification
- Domain: Eukaryota
- Kingdom: Animalia
- Phylum: Arthropoda
- Class: Insecta
- Order: Lepidoptera
- Family: Anomoeotidae
- Genus: Anomoeotes
- Species: A. separatula

Binomial name
- Anomoeotes separatula Strand, 1913

Species of moth

Anomoeotes separatula is a species of moth of the Anomoeotidae family. It is known from Equatorial Guinea.
