= Dianeura goochii =

Scientific classification
- Domain: Eukaryota
- Kingdom: Animalia
- Phylum: Arthropoda
- Class: Insecta
- Order: Lepidoptera
- Family: Anomoeotidae
- Genus: Dianeura
- Species: D. goochii

Binomial name
- Dianeura goochii Butler, 1888

Species of moth

Dianeura goochii is a species of moth of the Anomoeotidae family. It is known from South Africa.
