= Thermochrous fumicincta =

Scientific classification
- Kingdom: Animalia
- Phylum: Arthropoda
- Clade: Pancrustacea
- Class: Insecta
- Order: Lepidoptera
- Family: Anomoeotidae
- Genus: Thermochrous
- Species: T. fumicincta

Binomial name
- Thermochrous fumicincta Hampson, 1910

Species of moth

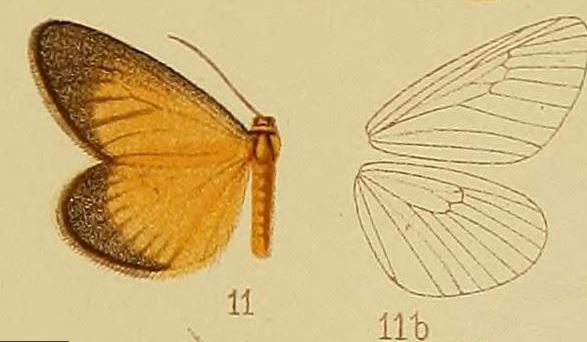
Thermochrous fumicincta

Thermochrous fumicincta is a species of moth of the Anomoeotidae family. It is found in the Republic of the Congo.
