= Anomoeotes triangularis =

Scientific classification
- Kingdom: Animalia
- Phylum: Arthropoda
- Clade: Pancrustacea
- Class: Insecta
- Order: Lepidoptera
- Family: Anomoeotidae
- Genus: Anomoeotes
- Species: A. triangularis

Binomial name
- Anomoeotes triangularis Jordan, 1907

Species of moth

Anomoeotes triangularis is a species of moth of the Anomoeotidae family. It is found in Sierra Leone.
