= Anomoeotes levis =

Scientific classification
- Kingdom: Animalia
- Phylum: Arthropoda
- Clade: Pancrustacea
- Class: Insecta
- Order: Lepidoptera
- Family: Anomoeotidae
- Genus: Anomoeotes
- Species: A. levis

Binomial name
- Anomoeotes levis Felder, 1888

Species of moth

Anomoeotes levis is a species of moth of the Anomoeotidae family. It is from South Africa.

The larvae have been recorded feeding on Bauhinia and Gardenia species.
