= Anomoeotes leucolena =

Scientific classification
- Domain: Eukaryota
- Kingdom: Animalia
- Phylum: Arthropoda
- Class: Insecta
- Order: Lepidoptera
- Family: Anomoeotidae
- Genus: Anomoeotes
- Species: A. leucolena

Binomial name
- Anomoeotes leucolena Holland, 1893

Species of moth

Anomoeotes leucolena is a species of moth of the Anomoeotidae family. It is known from Angola, Cameroon, Equatorial Guinea, Gabon and Sierra Leone.
