= Anomoeotes instabilis =

Scientific classification
- Kingdom: Animalia
- Phylum: Arthropoda
- Class: Insecta
- Order: Lepidoptera
- Family: Anomoeotidae
- Genus: Anomoeotes
- Species: A. instabilis

Binomial name
- Anomoeotes instabilis Talbot, 1929

Species of moth

Anomoeotes instabilis is a species of moth of the Anomoeotidae family. It is known from Cameroon.
