= Thermochrous stenocraspis =

Scientific classification
- Kingdom: Animalia
- Phylum: Arthropoda
- Class: Insecta
- Order: Lepidoptera
- Family: Anomoeotidae
- Genus: Thermochrous
- Species: T. stenocraspis

Binomial name
- Thermochrous stenocraspis Hampson, 1910

Species of moth

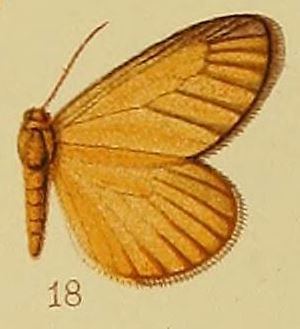
Thermochrous stenocraspis

Thermochrous stenocraspis is a species of moth of the Anomoeotidae family. It is found in the Democratic Republic of the Congo and Zimbabwe.
