= Anomoeotes phaeomera =

Scientific classification
- Kingdom: Animalia
- Phylum: Arthropoda
- Class: Insecta
- Order: Lepidoptera
- Family: Anomoeotidae
- Genus: Anomoeotes
- Species: A. phaeomera

Binomial name
- Anomoeotes phaeomera Hampson, 1920

Species of moth

Anomoeotes phaeomera is a species of moth of the Anomoeotidae family. It is known from Angola and Cameroon.
