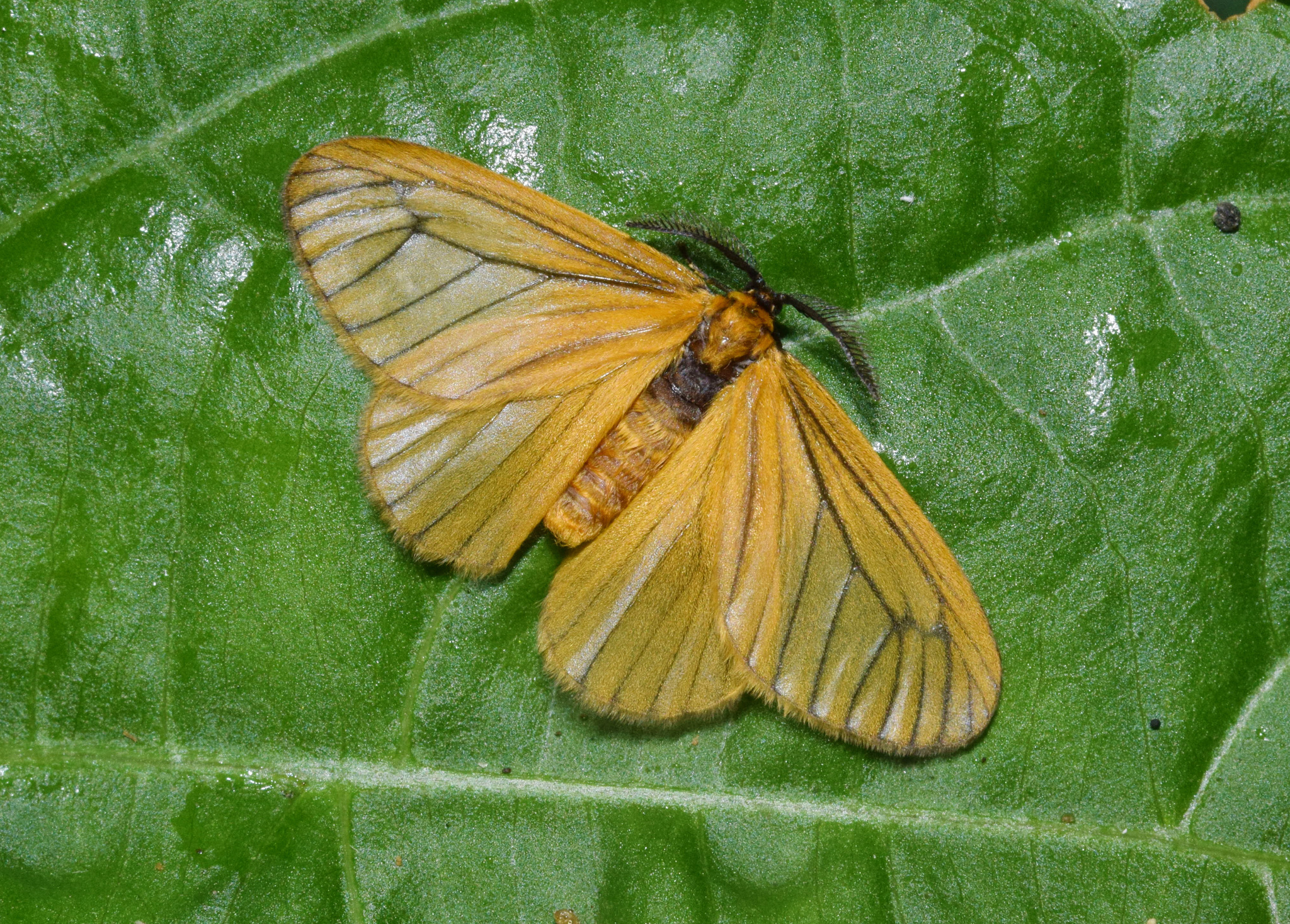
- Anomoeotes nigrivenosus

Scientific classification
- Domain: Eukaryota
- Kingdom: Animalia
- Phylum: Arthropoda
- Class: Insecta
- Order: Lepidoptera
- Family: Anomoeotidae
- Genus: Anomoeotes; Felder, 1874

Synonyms
- Anamoetes Holland, 1893; Anomocoetes Strand, 1912; Anomoetes Neave, 1940

= Anomoeotes =

Genus of moths

Anomoeotes is a genus of moths in the Anomoeotidae family.

== Species ==
- Anomoeotes diaphana Hering, 1932
- Anomoeotes elegans Pagenstecher, 1903
- Anomoeotes infuscata Talbot, 1929
- Anomoeotes instabilis Talbot, 1929
- Anomoeotes leucolena Holland, 1893
- Anomoeotes levis Felder, 1888
- Anomoeotes nigrivenosus Butler, 1893
- Anomoeotes nox Aurivillius, 1907
- Anomoeotes nuda Holland, 1897
- Anomoeotes phaeomera Hampson, 1920
- Anomoeotes separatula Strand, 1913
- Anomoeotes simulatrix Talbot, 1929
- Anomoeotes tenellula Holland, 1893
- Anomoeotes triangularis Jordan, 1907
