= Akesina =

Scientific classification
- Domain: Eukaryota
- Kingdom: Animalia
- Phylum: Arthropoda
- Class: Insecta
- Order: Lepidoptera
- Family: Anomoeotidae
- Genus: Akesina; Moore, 1888
- Species: A. basalis

Binomial name
- Akesina basalis Moore, 1888

Synonyms
- Anesina Kirby, 1892

Genus of moths

Akesina is a genus of moths in the family Anomoeotidae containing only one species Akesina basalis, which is known from Himachal Pradesh, India. Both the genus and species were first described by Frederic Moore in 1888.
