= Anomoeotes nuda =

Scientific classification
- Domain: Eukaryota
- Kingdom: Animalia
- Phylum: Arthropoda
- Class: Insecta
- Order: Lepidoptera
- Family: Anomoeotidae
- Genus: Anomoeotes
- Species: A. nuda

Binomial name
- Anomoeotes nuda Holland, 1897

Species of moth

Anomoeotes nuda is a species of moth of the Anomoeotidae family described by William Jacob Holland in 1897. It is known from Africa where it was found at the River Darde.
