= Dianeura =

Scientific classification
- Domain: Eukaryota
- Kingdom: Animalia
- Phylum: Arthropoda
- Class: Insecta
- Order: Lepidoptera
- Family: Anomoeotidae
- Genus: Dianeura; Butler, 1888

Synonyms
- Plethoneura Bryk, 1913

Genus of moths

Dianeura is a genus of moths in the Anomoeotidae family.

== Species ==
- Dianeura goochii Butler, 1888
- Dianeura jacksoni Butler, 1888
