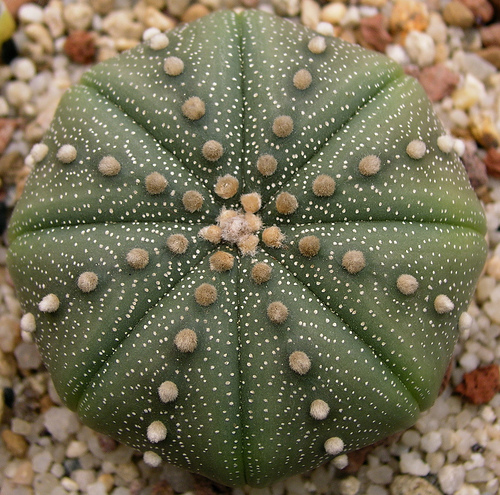

Conservation status
- Vulnerable (IUCN 3.1)
- CITES Appendix I

Scientific classification
- Kingdom: Plantae
- Clade: Embryophytes
- Clade: Tracheophytes
- Clade: Angiosperms
- Clade: Eudicots
- Order: Caryophyllales
- Family: Cactaceae
- Subfamily: Cactoideae
- Genus: Astrophytum
- Species: A. asterias

Binomial name
- Astrophytum asterias (Zucc.) Lem.

= Astrophytum asterias =

Species of cactus

Astrophytum asterias is a species of cactus in the genus Astrophytum, and is native to small parts of Texas in the United States and Mexico. Common names include sand dollar cactus, sea urchin cactus, star cactus and star peyote.

== Description ==
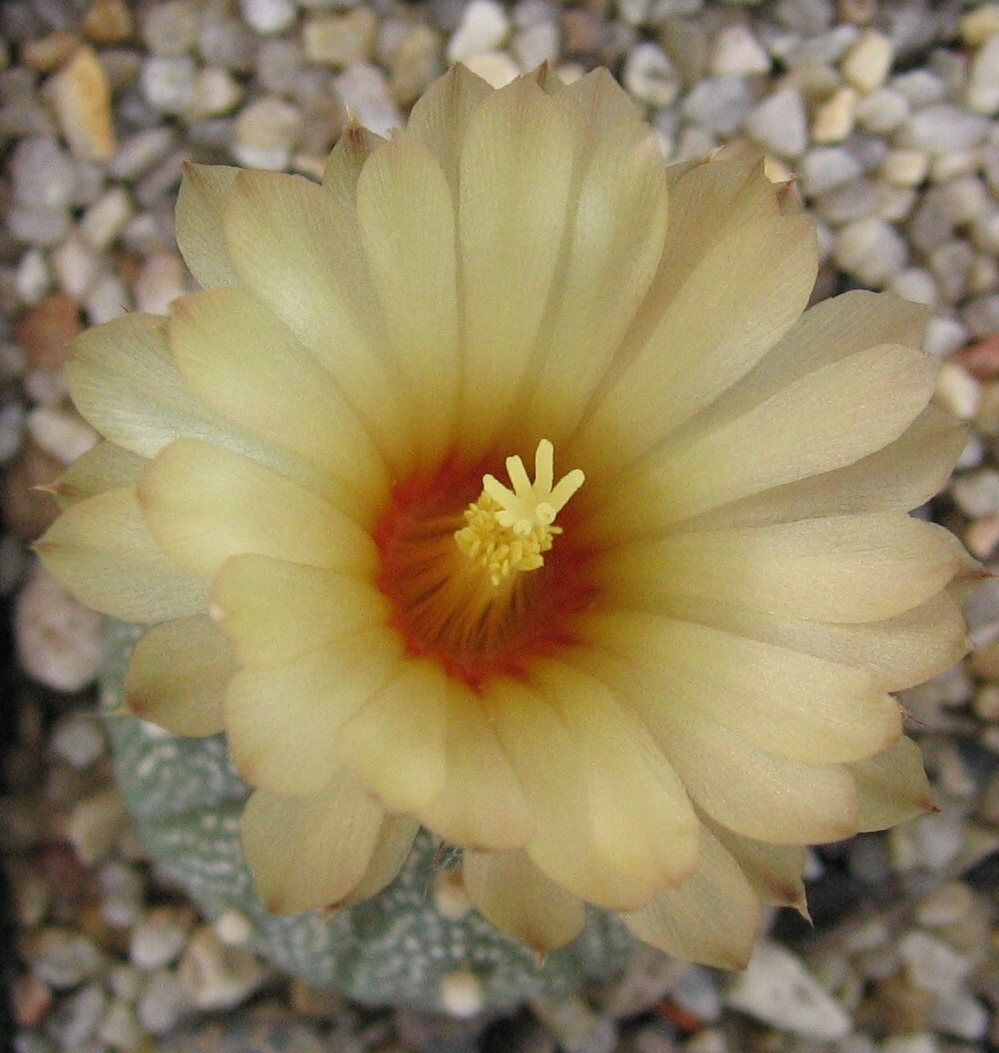
Astrophytum asterias in flower

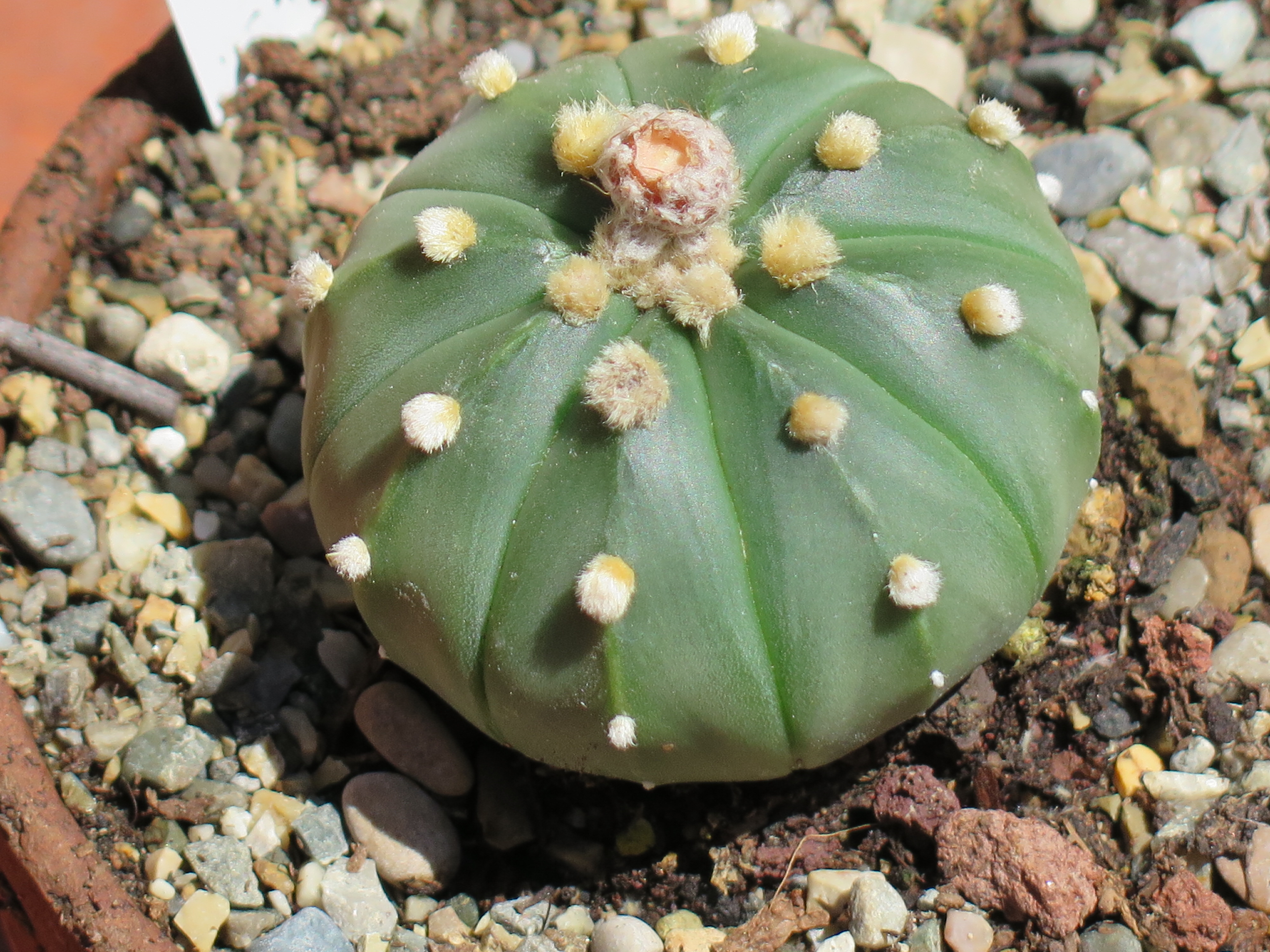
Astrophytum asterias nudum

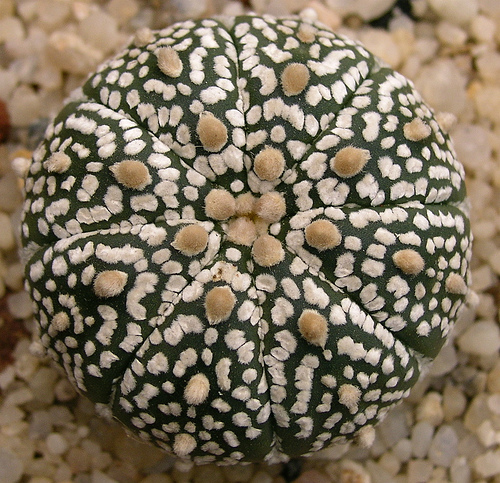
Astrophytum asterias 'Super Kabuto'

A. asterias is small, round, spineless and squat, reaching a height of 2.5–6 cm (1–2 in) and a diameter of 5–15 cm (2–6 in). The disc-shaped body is divided into 7–10 sections, known as ribs; in the middle of each rib there are woolly areoles. The body is a greenish-brown colour and may appear speckled from its covering of white scales (trichomes). The flowers of this cactus are yellow with red bases and the outer parts are very woolly. Green to pink oval fruits are produced; the outside coat is covered with woolly hairs.

== Biology ==
Reproduction takes place via sexual outcrossing through cross-pollination; star cacti reach sexual maturity after a few years, when they have attained 2–3 cm (0.8–1.2 in) in diameter. Flowers are produced from March to June (the summer season in its native habitat) and fruiting occurs from April to June. The primary pollinators of A. asterias are medium to large size bees with one species, Diadasia rinconis being the most effective.

== Distribution and habitat ==
Star cactus is native to the lower Rio Grande Valley of Texas in the United States and the states of Nuevo León and Tamaulipas in Mexico, to the east of the Sierra Madre Oriental mountain range.

Previously more abundant, this species is today restricted to a small portion of Starr County, Texas, and a few localized sites in Tamaulipas. Today this species is associated with thorn scrub, amongst rocky ground; it may have previously occupied richer, flat grasslands that have since been developed. It has probably been extirpated from Nuevo León.

== Cultivation ==
Sand Dollar Cactus has been grown as a houseplant since the 1840s, like other members of its genus and despite its rarity in the wild. It is readily propagated from seed, so most plants encountered in nurseries are seed grown. The popularity of this species among collectors and enthusiasts has ensured that a number of cultivars are available. One such cultivar is the 'Super Kabuto', a clonally propagated variety whose large trichomes congregate into dense spots, arranged in a striking pattern.

== Conservation ==
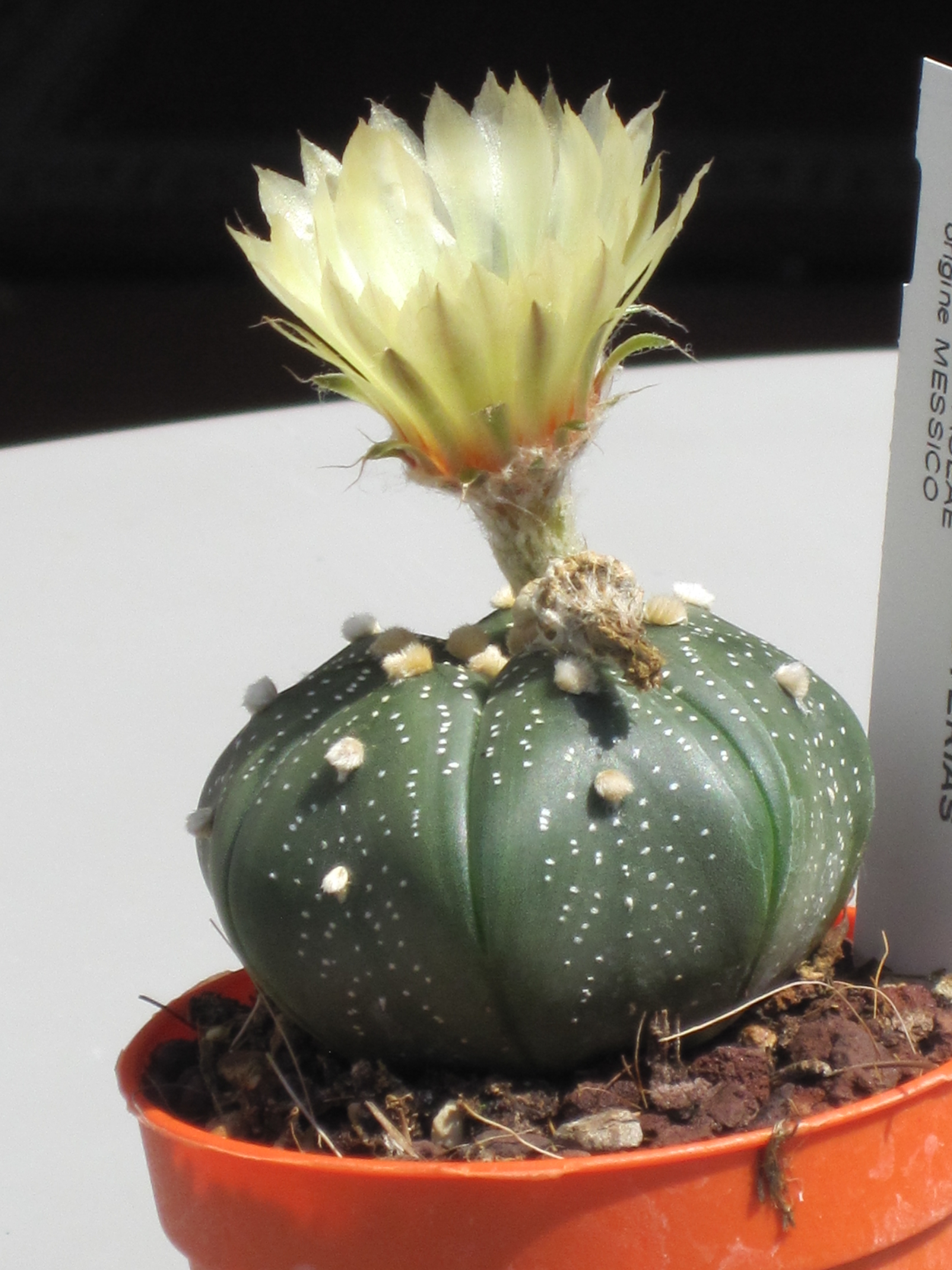
Astrophytum asterias with flower

As with certain other slowly maturing cacti, A. asterias is listed as endangered by the United States Fish and Wildlife Service, vulnerable on the International Union for Conservation of Nature's Red List, and critically imperiled by The Nature Conservancy. It is listed on Appendix I of the Convention on International Trade in Endangered Species of Wild Fauna and Flora (CITES), meaning that commercial international trade in wild-collected specimens is prohibited. Despite this protection, illegal collection continues to threaten the future of this species, and its decline in the wild has been largely attributed to over-collection and poaching. It is sometimes accidentally harvested due to its similarity to the closely related and coexisting peyote (Lophophora williamsii). Other contributing factors are thought to be urban development and herbicides. Habitat destruction has been, and remains, the major cause of the decline in this species; vast areas have been converted to agricultural use and road construction. In Texas, mechanical and chemical bush clearing techniques together with the introduction of invasive grasses have had devastating effects.

The United States Fish and Wildlife Service have drafted a Recovery Plan in an attempt to secure the future of this species. The Recovery Plan highlights the need to protect existing populations, carry out research into possible new populations and to develop a formal conservation agreement between the United States and Mexico.
