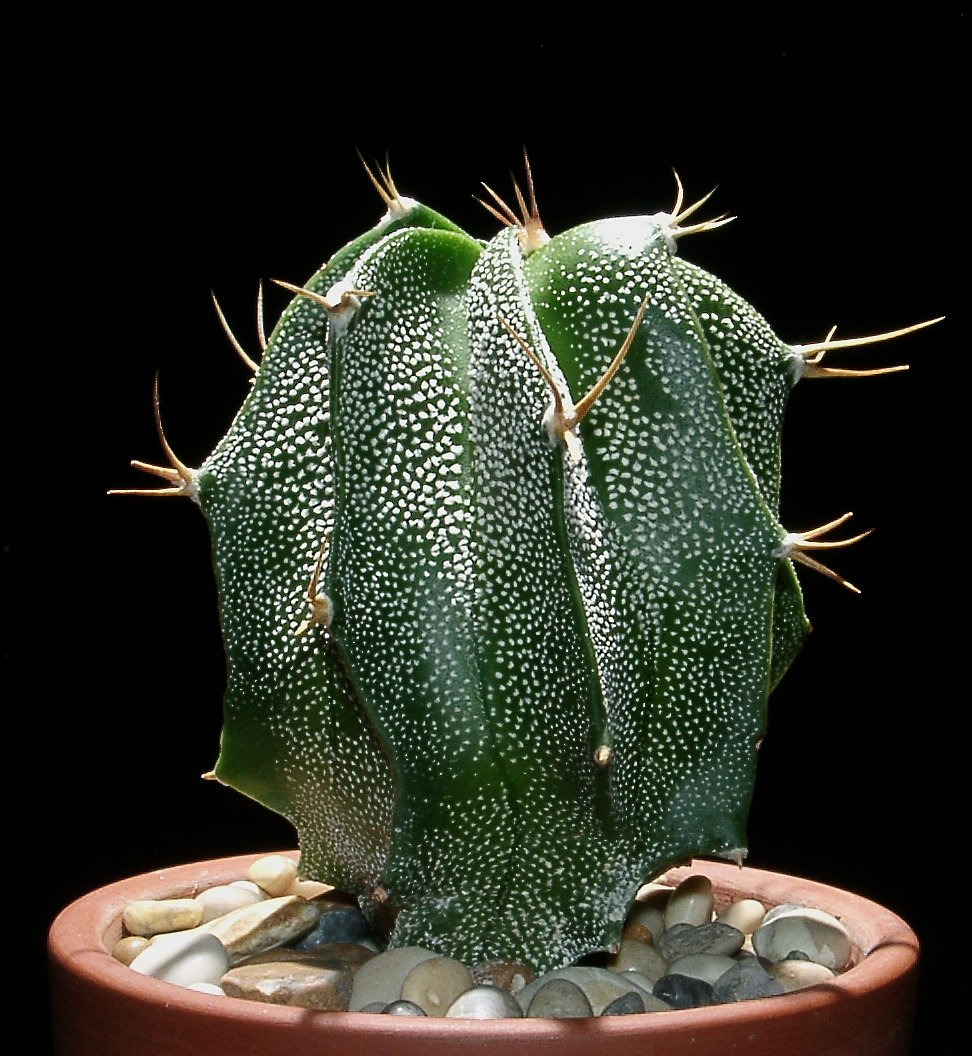

Conservation status
- Vulnerable (IUCN 3.1)

Scientific classification
- Kingdom: Plantae
- Clade: Embryophytes
- Clade: Tracheophytes
- Clade: Spermatophytes
- Clade: Angiosperms
- Clade: Eudicots
- Order: Caryophyllales
- Family: Cactaceae
- Subfamily: Cactoideae
- Genus: Astrophytum
- Species: A. ornatum

Binomial name
- Astrophytum ornatum (DC.) Britton & Rose

= Astrophytum ornatum =

Species of cactus

Astrophytum ornatum, the bishop's cap or monk's hood cactus, is a flowering plant of the family Cactaceae, endemic to the Central Plateau of Mexico. It is the largest and tallest species of Astrophytum.

== Description ==
Solitary and cylindrical in form, it may grow up to 2 metres (6.6 ft) in height and 30 centimetres (12 in) in width on the Central Plateau. It develops numerous white woolly flakes for protection from the sun. It flowers throughout the summer, the flowers being 7 to 8 centimeters long in canary yellow.

== Cultivation ==
It is a rugged plant resistant to root rot, and easy to grow in a well-drained soil. It is dark green when grown in filtered light or shade. An established plant is cold tolerant to 25 °F (−4 °C).

Astrophytum ornatum has gained the Royal Horticultural Society's Award of Garden Merit.

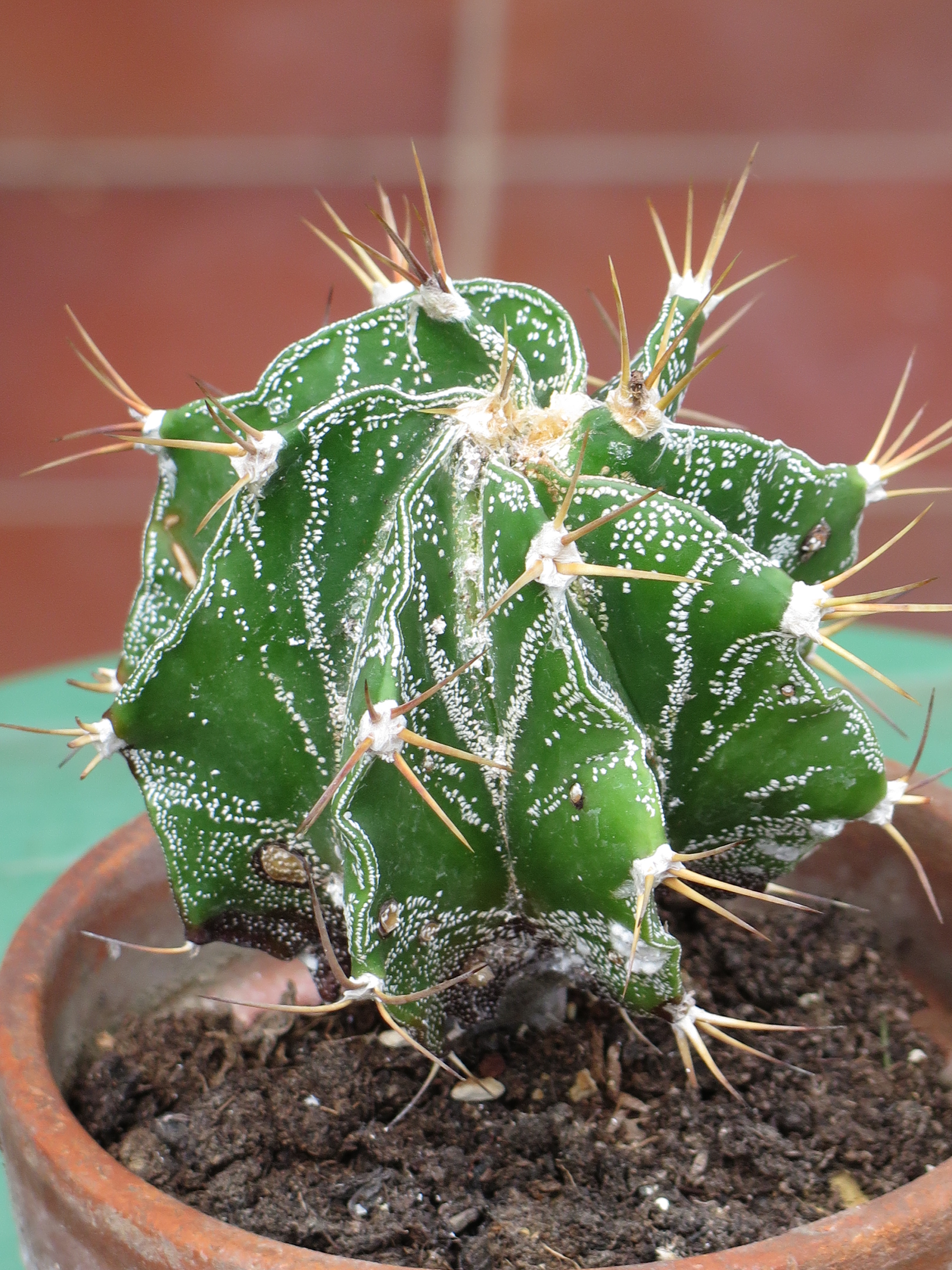
It usually has 8 ribs, often in spiral

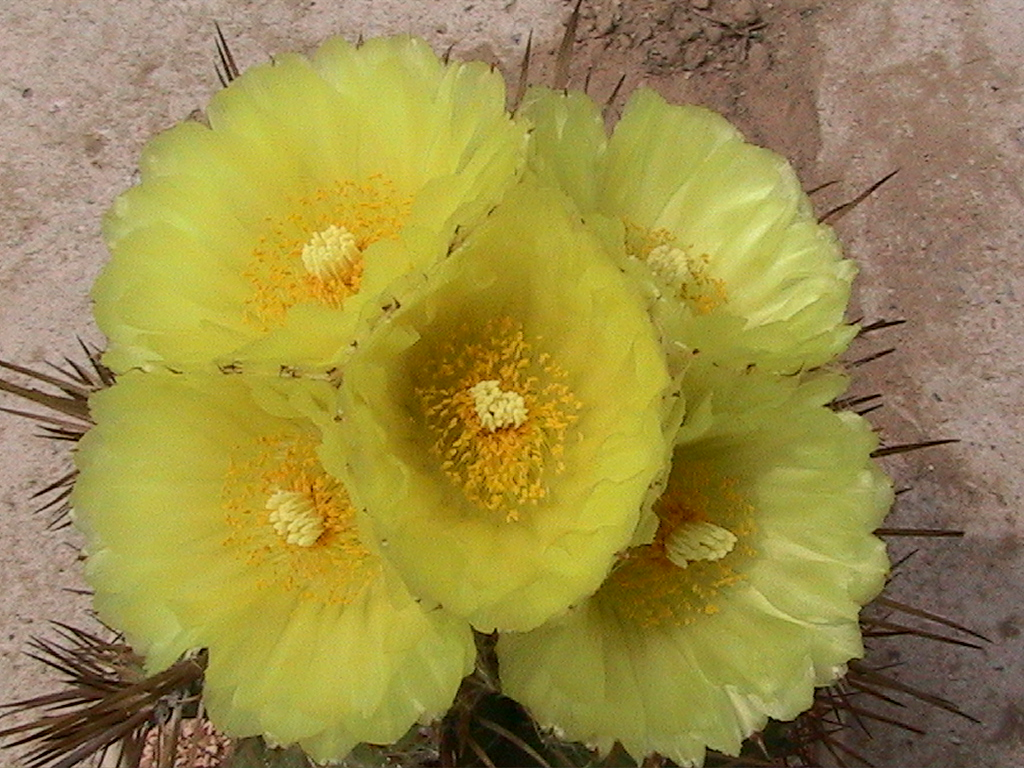
Flowers

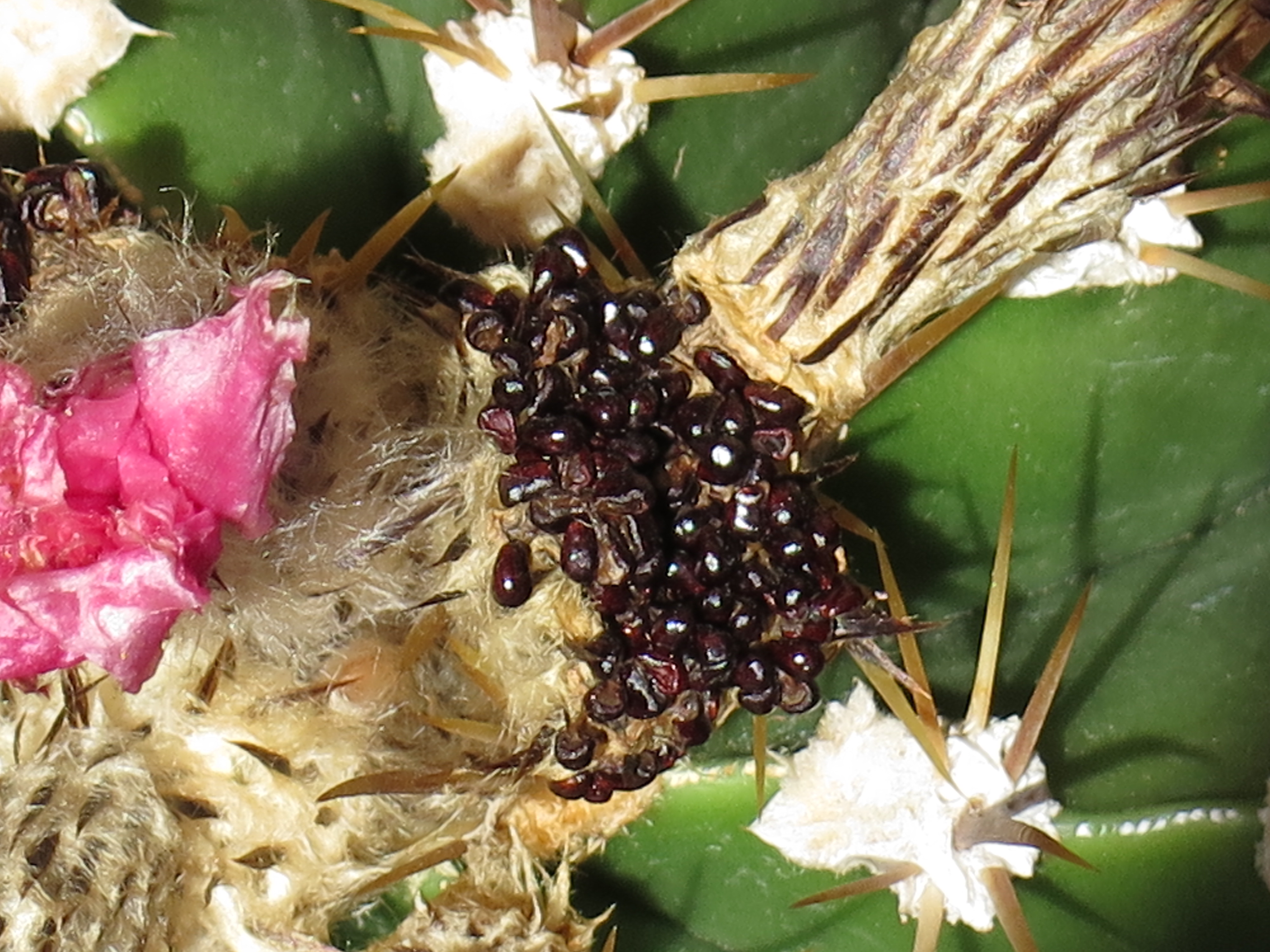
Seeds

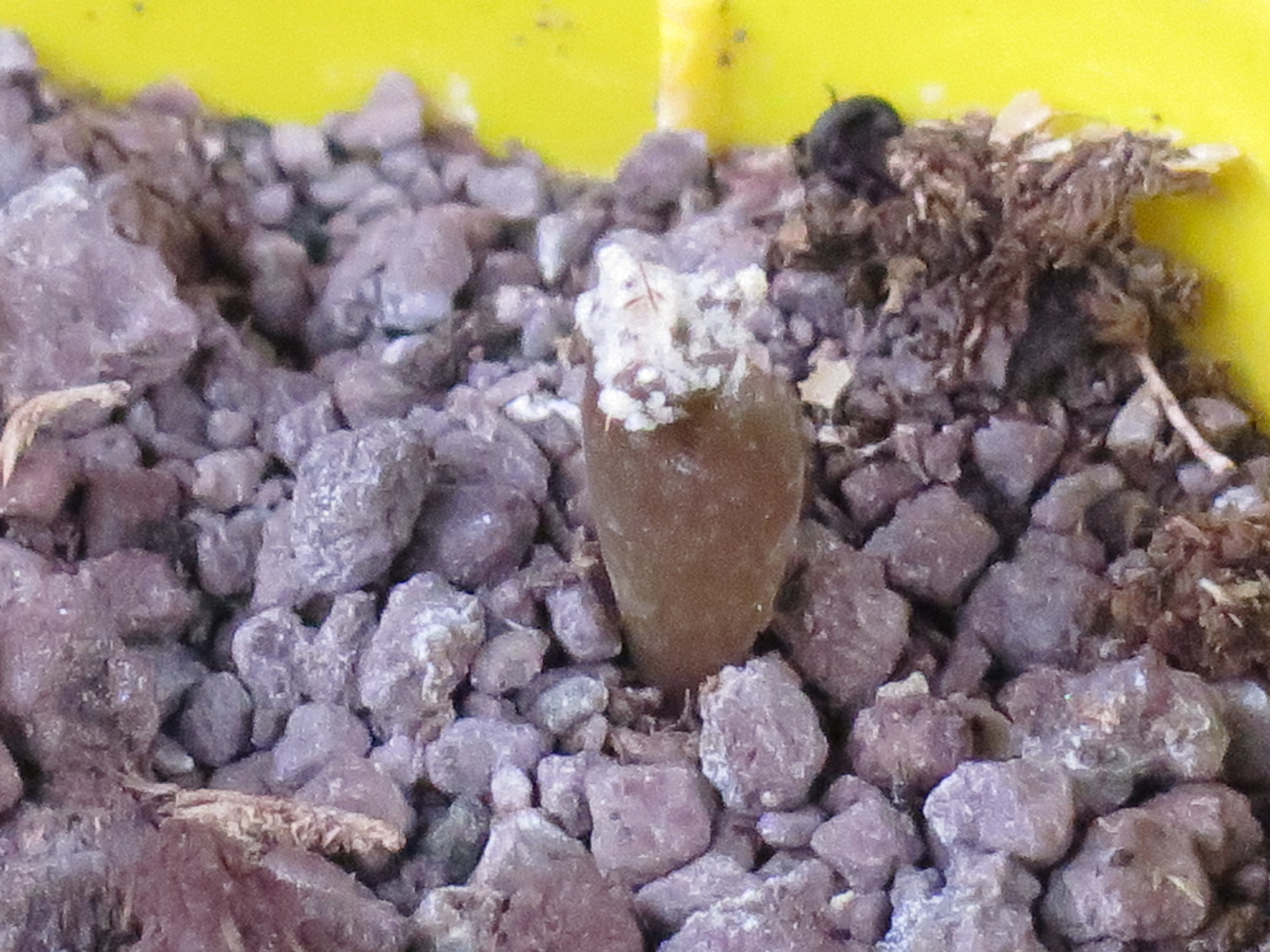
A one month old seedling

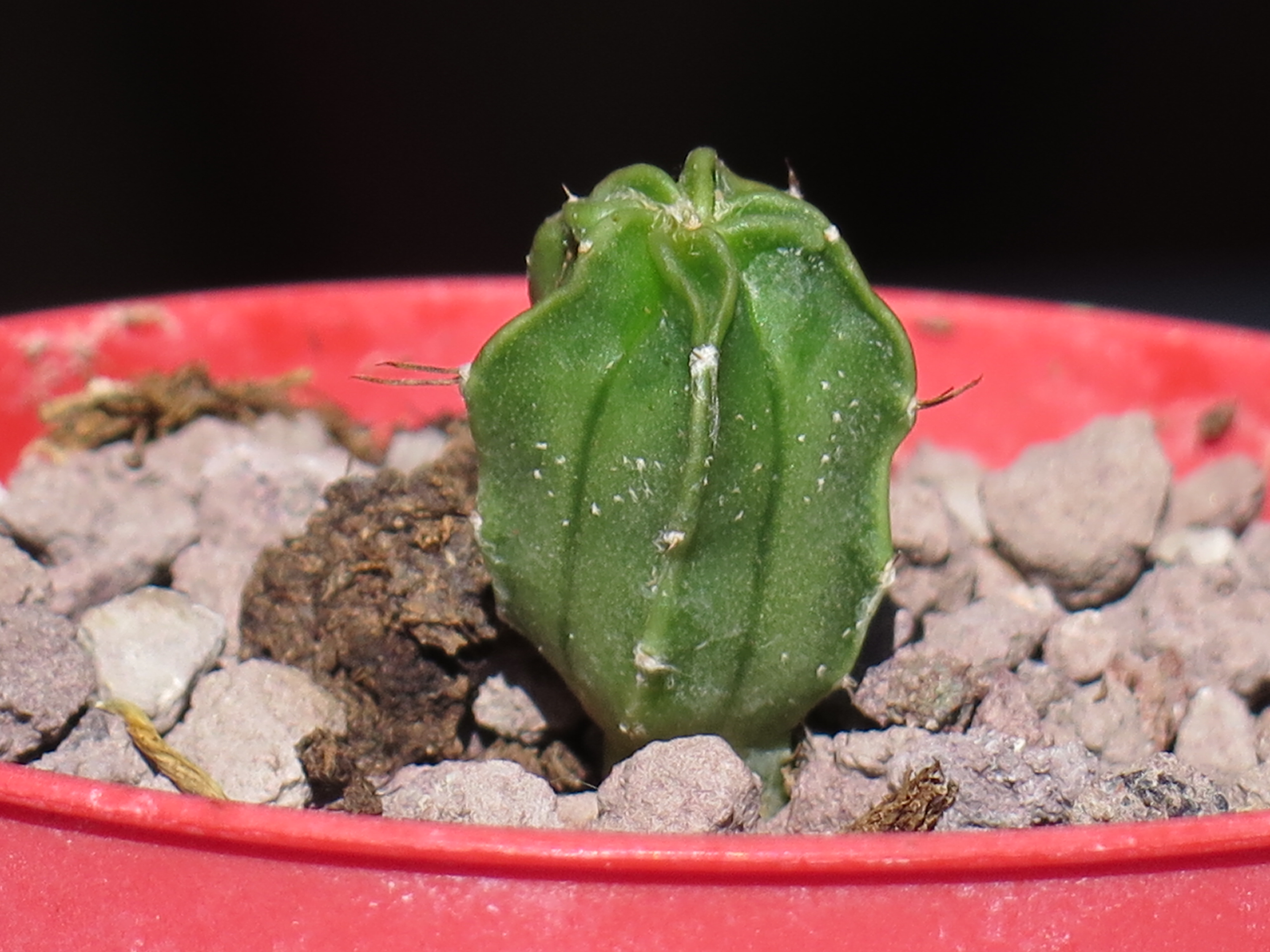
Astrophytum one year after sowing
