= Living rock =

Living rock can refer to:

- Rock-cut architecture, in phrases such as "hewn from the living rock"
- Dwarf succulent plants resembling stones, especially of the genera:

- Ariocarpus
- Astrophytum
- Aztekium
- Epithelantha
- Geohintonia
- Lithops
- Lophophora
- Obregonia
- Turbinicarpus
- Strombocactus

- Pyura chilensis, a tunicate that resembles a mass of organs inside a rock

== See also ==
- Live rock
