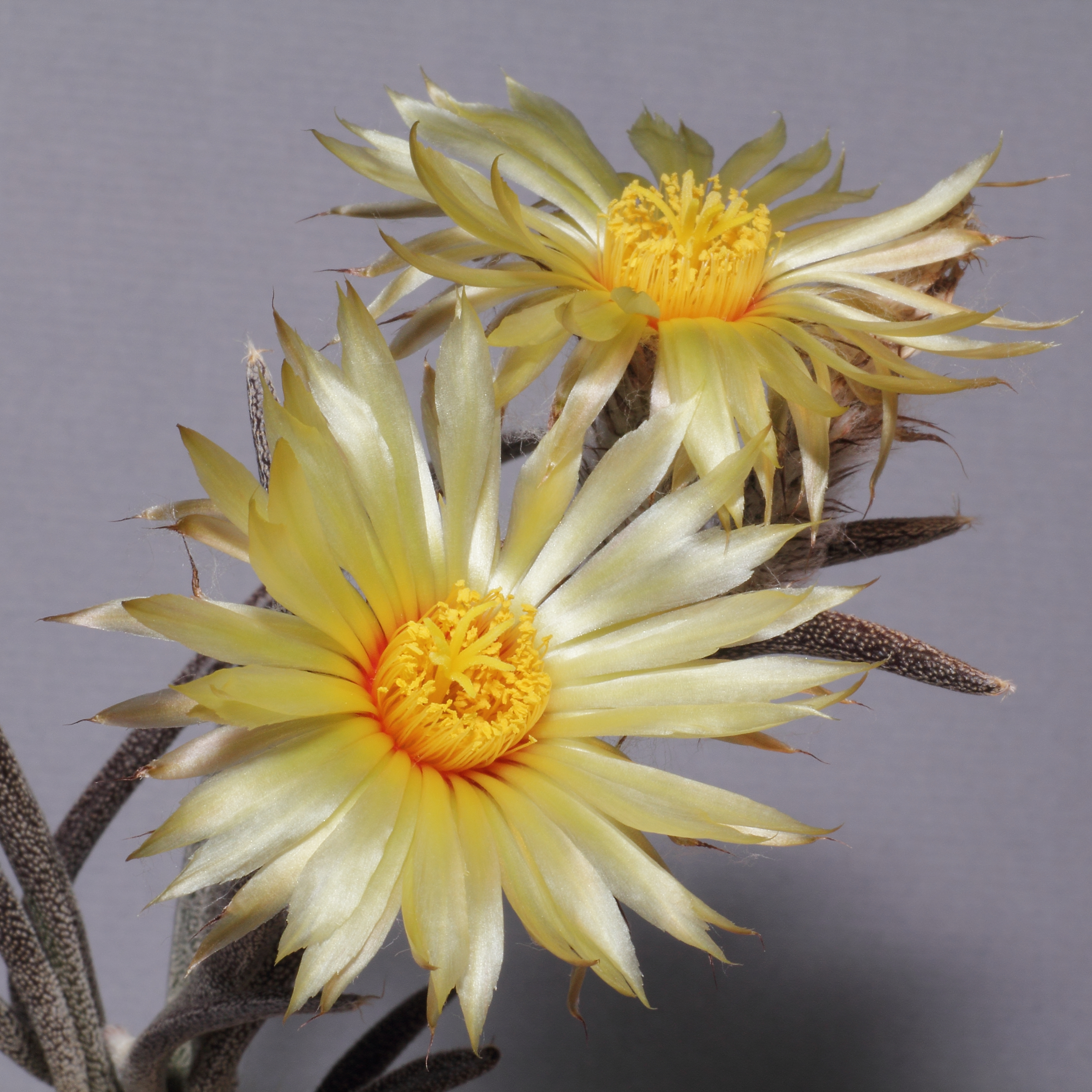

Conservation status
- Critically Endangered (IUCN 3.1)

Scientific classification
- Kingdom: Plantae
- Clade: Embryophytes
- Clade: Tracheophytes
- Clade: Spermatophytes
- Clade: Angiosperms
- Clade: Eudicots
- Order: Caryophyllales
- Family: Cactaceae
- Subfamily: Cactoideae
- Genus: Astrophytum
- Species: A. caput-medusae

Binomial name
- Astrophytum caput-medusae (Velazco & Nevárez) D.R.Hunt

Synonyms
- Digitostigma caput-medusae Velazco & Nevárez

= Astrophytum caput-medusae =

Species of cactus

Astrophytum caput-medusae (synonym Digitostigma caput-medusae) is a species of cactus native to Mexico.

== Description ==
This species differs from the conventional star-shaped phenotype associated with other Astrophytum members. It has a very reduced, shortly cylindrical stem that lacks ribs. The stem collar and apex is covered in paper-like bristles that originates from the basal rest of tubercles. The bristles are coffee-colored with reddish tones. A taproot is formed. The tubercles are cylindrical (occasionally triangular when young), of cartilaginous consistency, smooth, growing up to 19 cm in length and 0.2-0.5 cm in width. Tubercles are glaucous-green in color, almost totally covered with greyish-white trichomes. It grows up to 4 spines of 0.1-0.3 cm in length that generally persists on old tubercles.

The flowers grow on the developing sections of the tubercles. It is yellow with an orange-colored base. Outer segments are greenish yellow, and covered with white hairs and spines. Fruits are green and fleshy, drying as it ripens. Seeds are cap-shaped, dark coffee or black, and measures up to 0.3 cm.

== Distribution and habitat ==
A. caput-medusae is native to Mexico, specifically the state of Nuevo León. The plant is reportedly found growing wild only at a single location.
