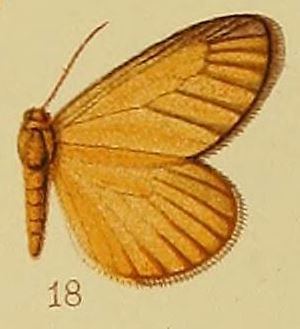
- Thermochrous stenocraspis

Scientific classification
- Kingdom: Animalia
- Phylum: Arthropoda
- Class: Insecta
- Order: Lepidoptera
- Family: Anomoeotidae
- Genus: Thermochrous; Hampson, 1910

Synonyms
- Termochrous Hering, 1937

= Thermochrous =

Genus of moths

Thermochrous is a genus of moths in the Anomoeotidae family.

== Species ==
- Thermochrous exigua Talbot, 1932
- Thermochrous fumicincta Hampson, 1910
- Thermochrous marginata Talbot, 1929
- Thermochrous melanoneura Hampson, 1920
- Thermochrous neurophaea Hering, 1928
- Thermochrous stenocraspis Hampson, 1910
- Thermochrous succisa Hering, 1937
