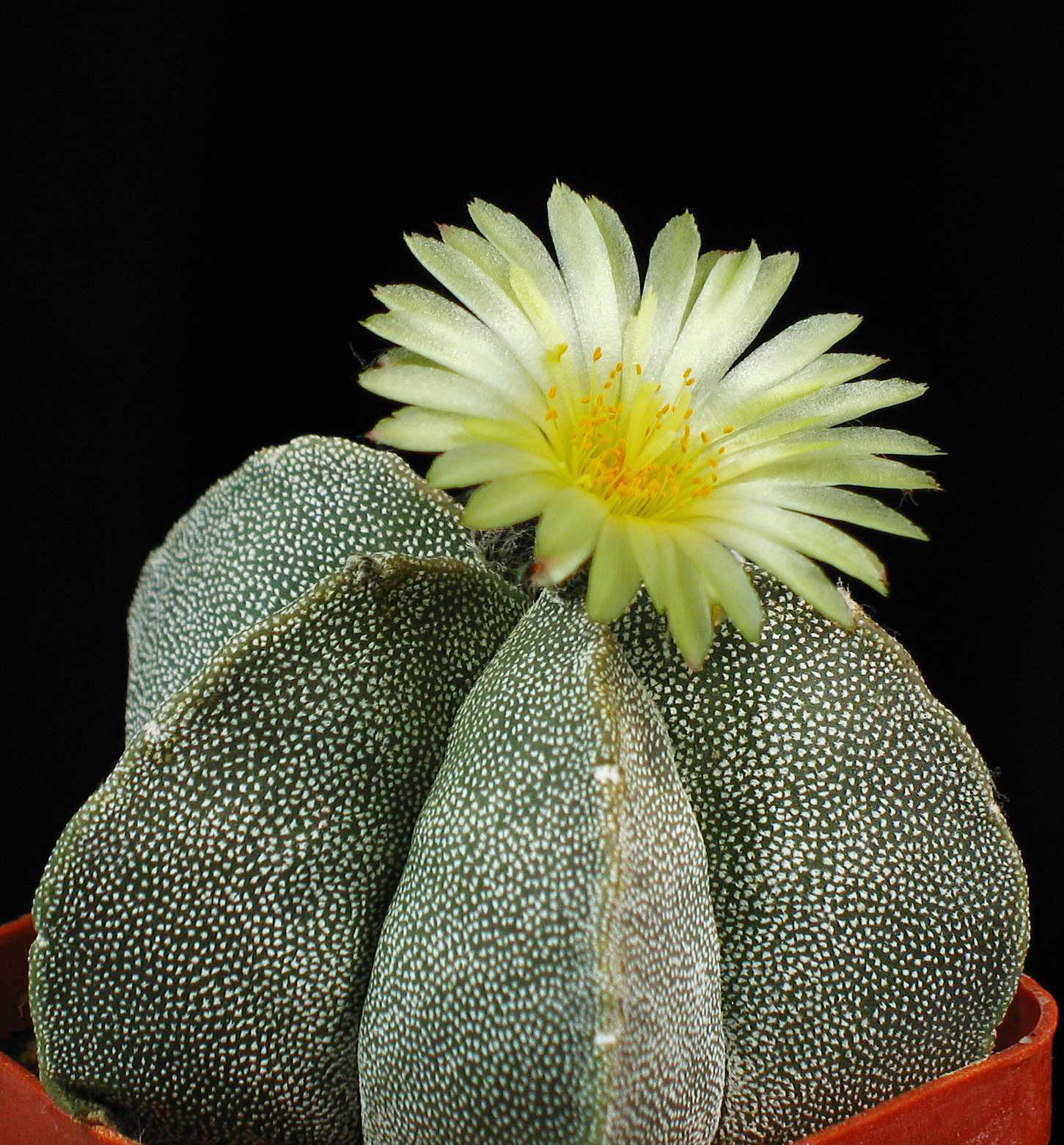
- Astrophytum myriostigma

Scientific classification
- Kingdom: Plantae
- Clade: Tracheophytes
- Clade: Angiosperms
- Clade: Eudicots
- Order: Caryophyllales
- Family: Cactaceae
- Subfamily: Cactoideae
- Tribe: Cacteae
- Genus: Astrophytum; Lem.

Type species
- Astrophytum myriostigma

Species
- A. asterias A. capricorne A. caput-medusae A. coahuilense A. myriostigma A. ornatum

= Astrophytum =

Genus of cacti

Astrophytum is a genus of six species of cacti, native to North America.

These species are sometimes referred to as living rocks, though the term is also used for other genera, particularly Lithops (Aizoaceae). The generic name is derived from the Greek words άστρον (astron), meaning "star", and φυτόν (phyton), meaning "plant".

== Description ==
The species of the genus Astrophytum usually grow individually with spherical to columnar green shoots and reach heights of up to 1.5 meters. The shoots are often densely covered with fine white tufts of hair, but sometimes they are completely bald. There are 4–10 (rarely 3) very noticeable ribs that are not divided into cusps. The large areoles stand close together, but do not merge. The spike is variable. Spines may be present or may be missing entirely.

The funnel-shaped, large flowers are yellow or yellow with a red throat. They appear at the top of the shoots and open during the day. The pericarpel is covered with pointed scales. The cap-shaped seeds have a diameter of up to 2.5 millimeters with a brownish black seed coat which is almost smooth. The edge is rolled towards the sunken hilum.

== Species ==
| Image | Scientific name | Common name | Distribution |
|---|---|---|---|
| | Astrophytum asterias (Zucc.) Lem. | Sand dollar cactus, sea urchin cactus, star peyote | small parts of Texas in the United States and Mexico. |
| | Astrophytum capricorne (A.Dietr.) Britton & Rose | Goat's horn cactus | Coahuila regions of Northern Mexico. |
| | Astrophytum caput-medusae D.R.Hunt | | Nuevo León, Mexico |
| | Astrophytum coahuilense (H.Moeller) Kanfer | | Coahuila and Durango, Mexico |
| | Astrophytum myriostigma Lem. | Bishop's cap cactus, bishop's hat, bishop's mitre cactus | northeastern and central Mexico. |
| | Astrophytum ornatum (DC.) Britton & Rose – Monk's hood | bishop's cap or monk's hood cactus | Central Plateau of Mexico. |

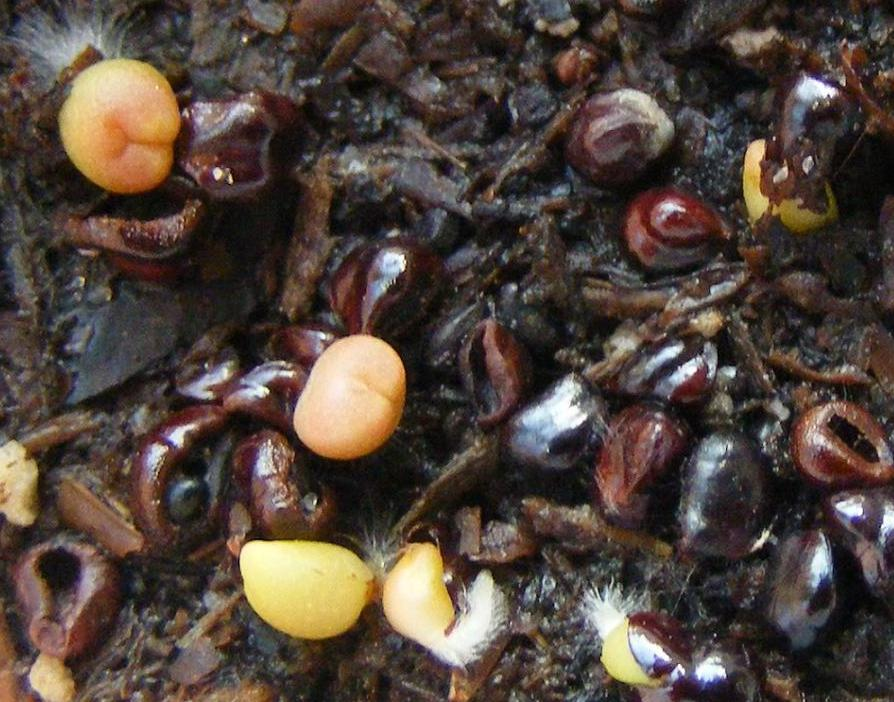
Seedlings of Astrophytum spp.

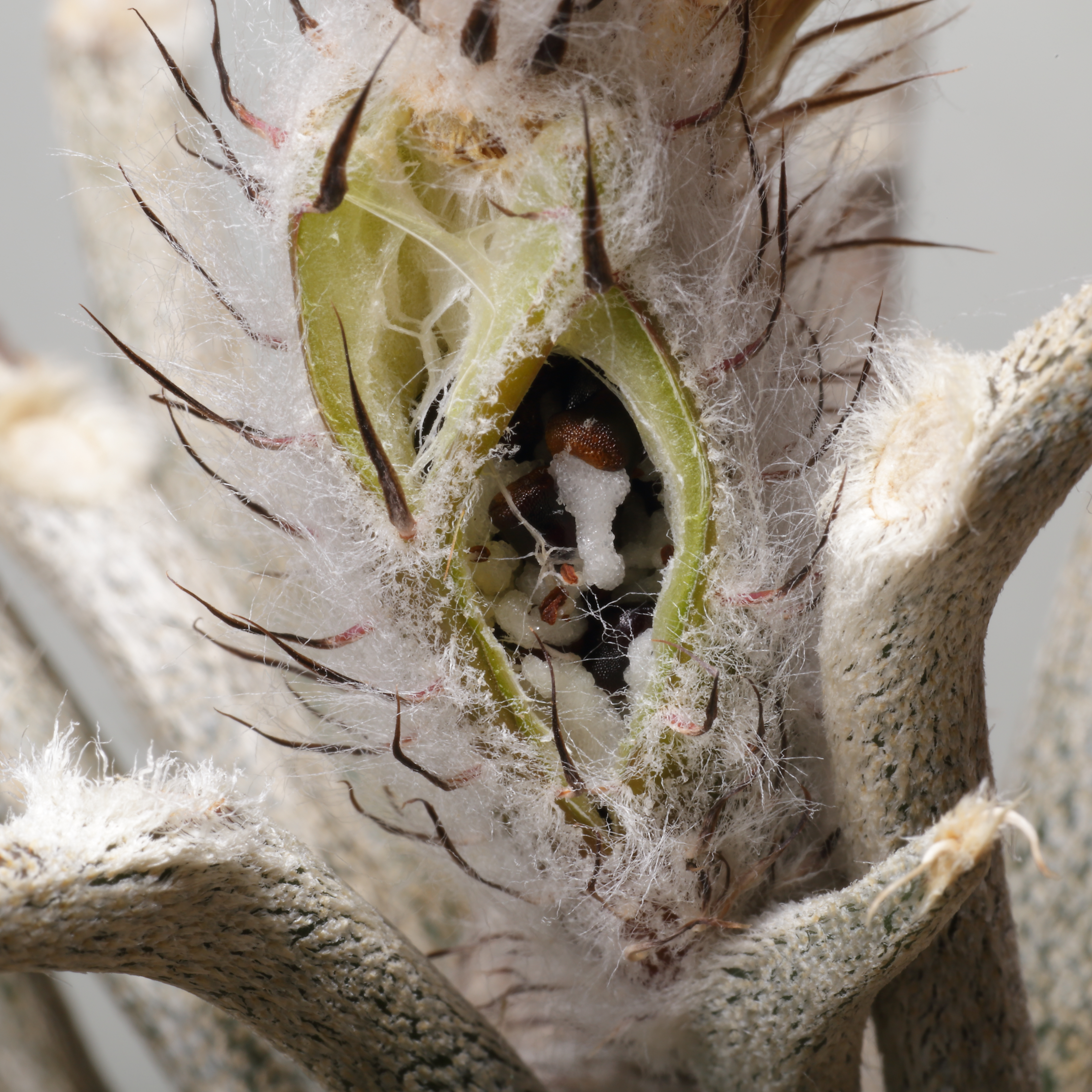
A ripe fruit of A. caput-medusae with seeds and testa showing

== Synonymy ==
The genus has several synonyms:

- Astrophyton Lawr., orth. var.
- Digitostigma Velazco & Nevárez
- Maierocactus E.C.Rost

There are a number of species synonyms sometimes seen:

| Name | Synonym of |
|---|---|
| Astrophytum columnare | Astrophytum myriostigma |
| Astrophytum crassispinoides | Astrophytum capricorne var. crassispinoides |
| Astrophytum glabrescens | Astrophytum ornatum |
| Astrophytum niveum | Astrophytum capricorne var. niveum |
| Astrophytum nuda | Astrophytum myriostigma var. nudum |
| Astrophytum prismaticum | Astrophytum myriostigma |
| Astrophytum senile | Astrophytum capricorne |
| Astrophytum tulense | Astrophytum myriostigma |
