= Astrophytum capricorne =

Conservation status
- Least Concern (IUCN 3.1)

Scientific classification
- Kingdom: Plantae
- Clade: Tracheophytes
- Clade: Angiosperms
- Clade: Eudicots
- Order: Caryophyllales
- Family: Cactaceae
- Subfamily: Cactoideae
- Genus: Astrophytum
- Species: A. capricorne

Binomial name
- Astrophytum capricorne (A.Dietr.) Britton & Rose

Species of cactus

Astrophytum capricorne, the goat's horn cactus, is a species of flowering plant in the cactus family Cactaceae, that is native to the Coahuila regions of Northern Mexico. Growing to 50 centimetres (20 in) tall by 10 centimetres (3.9 in) wide in a ball or oval shape, it is grey-green in colour with 7 to 9 prominent ribs, very long twisted spines and yellow flowers with a red centre in summer.

The common name of goat's horn cactus corresponds to the species identifier capricorne (capri meaning "goat" and corne meaning "horn") referring to the curved spines that are said to resemble a goat's horns.

This species is designated as of "least concern" by the IUCN as it is widely distributed in the Chihuahuan desert.

== Cultivation ==
This species is grown, typically from seed, as an ornamental plant as it produces large, attractive yellow flowers with red central regions. Some cultivars bear white flecking on the plant body while others lack this feature. Though tolerant of cold temperatures, it must be grown in a warm, sheltered spot which does not freeze in winter. The soil should be poor, alkaline and very sharply drained. Alternatively it can be grown under glass in a pot with cactus compost. In cultivation in the UK, Astrophytum capricorne has gained the Royal Horticultural Society's Award of Garden Merit.

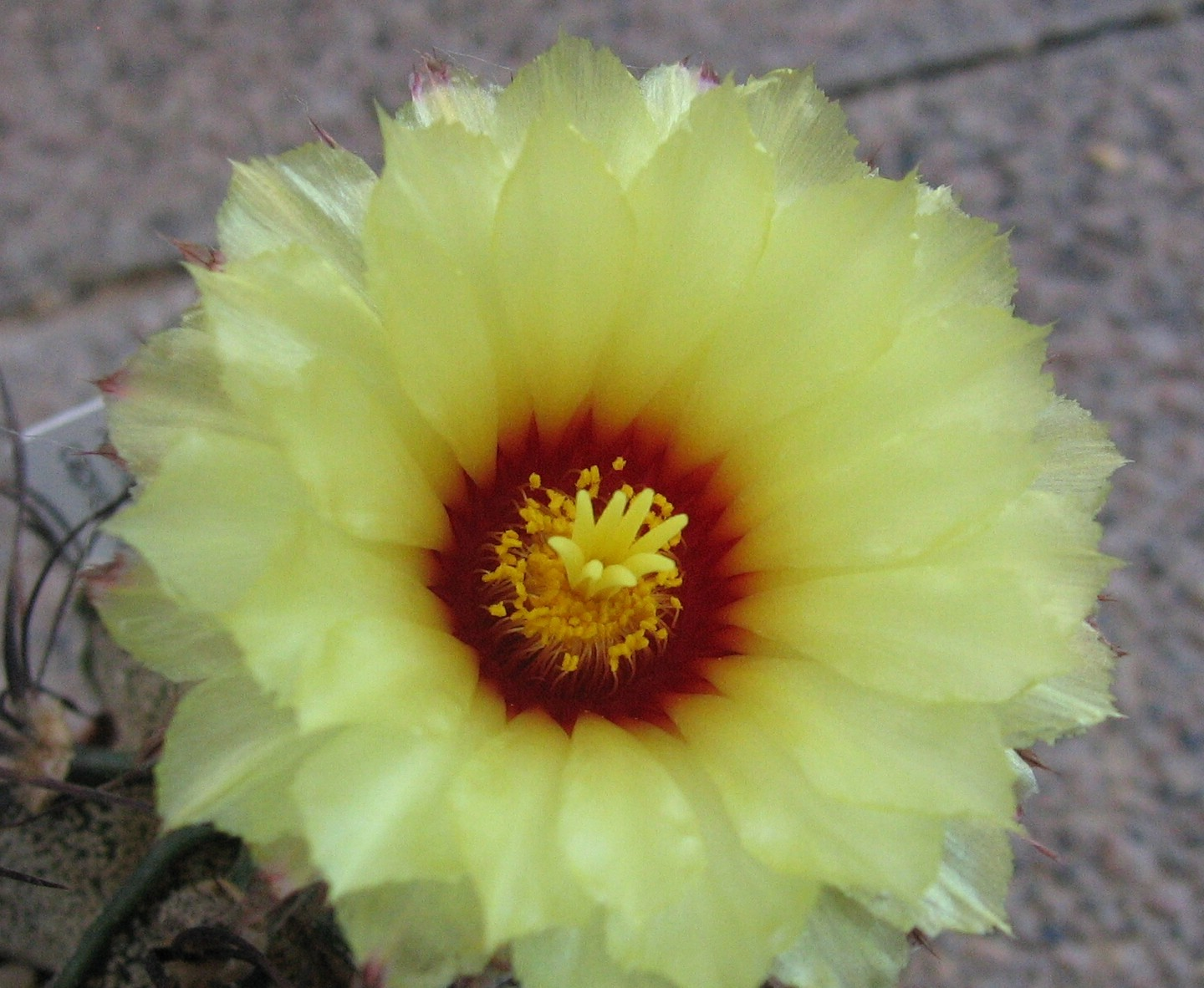
Astrophytum capricorne in flower

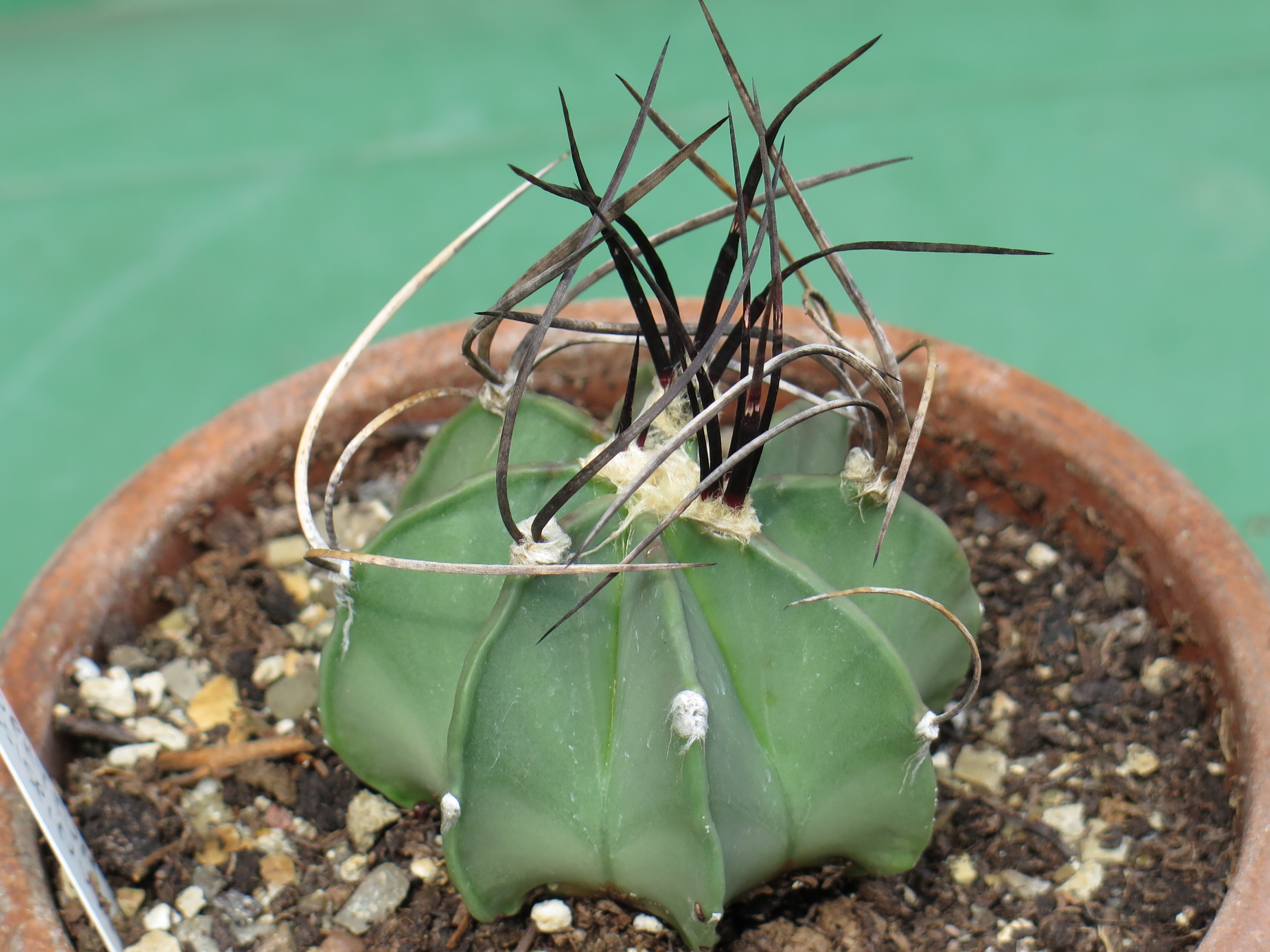
Astrophytum capricorne var. crassispinum

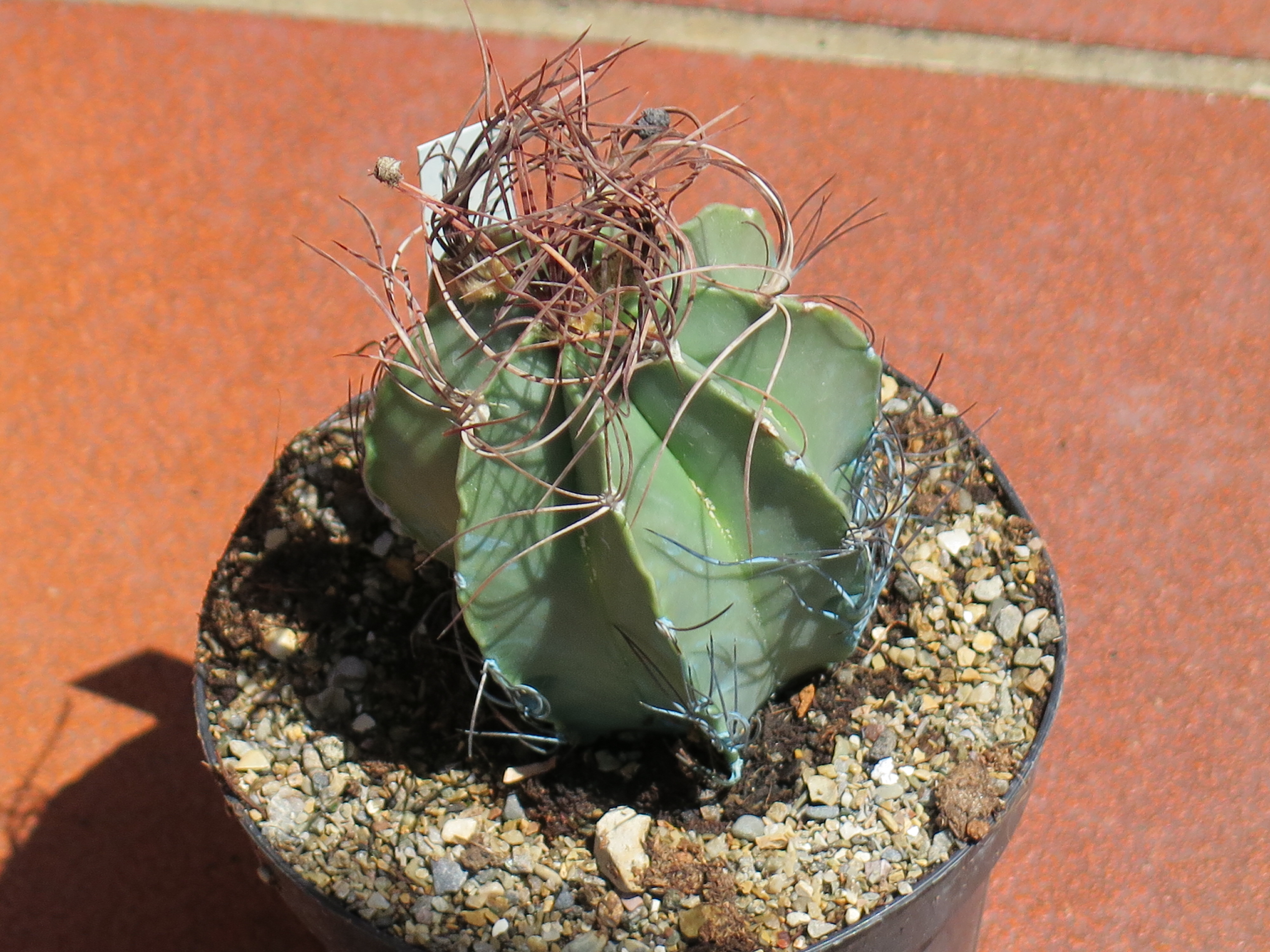
Astrophytum capricorne var. senile

Prominent varieties and cultivars include:

- Astrophytum capricorne 'Crassispinoides'
- Astrophytum capricorne var. crassispinum
- Astrophytum capricorne var. minus
- Astrophytum capricorne var. niveum
- Astrophytum capricorne var. senile
- Astrophytum capricorne var. aureum
