= Achroosia =

Scientific classification
- Kingdom: Animalia
- Phylum: Arthropoda
- Clade: Pancrustacea
- Class: Insecta
- Order: Lepidoptera
- Superfamily: Noctuoidea
- Family: Erebidae
- Subfamily: Arctiinae
- Tribe: Lithosiini
- Genus: Achroosia; Hampson, 1900
- Species: A. nuda

Binomial name
- Achroosia nuda Hampson, 1900

Genus of moths

Achroosia is a monotypic moth genus in the subfamily Arctiinae. Its single species, Achroosia nuda, is found in Espírito Santo, Brazil. Both the genus and species were first described by George Hampson in 1900.
