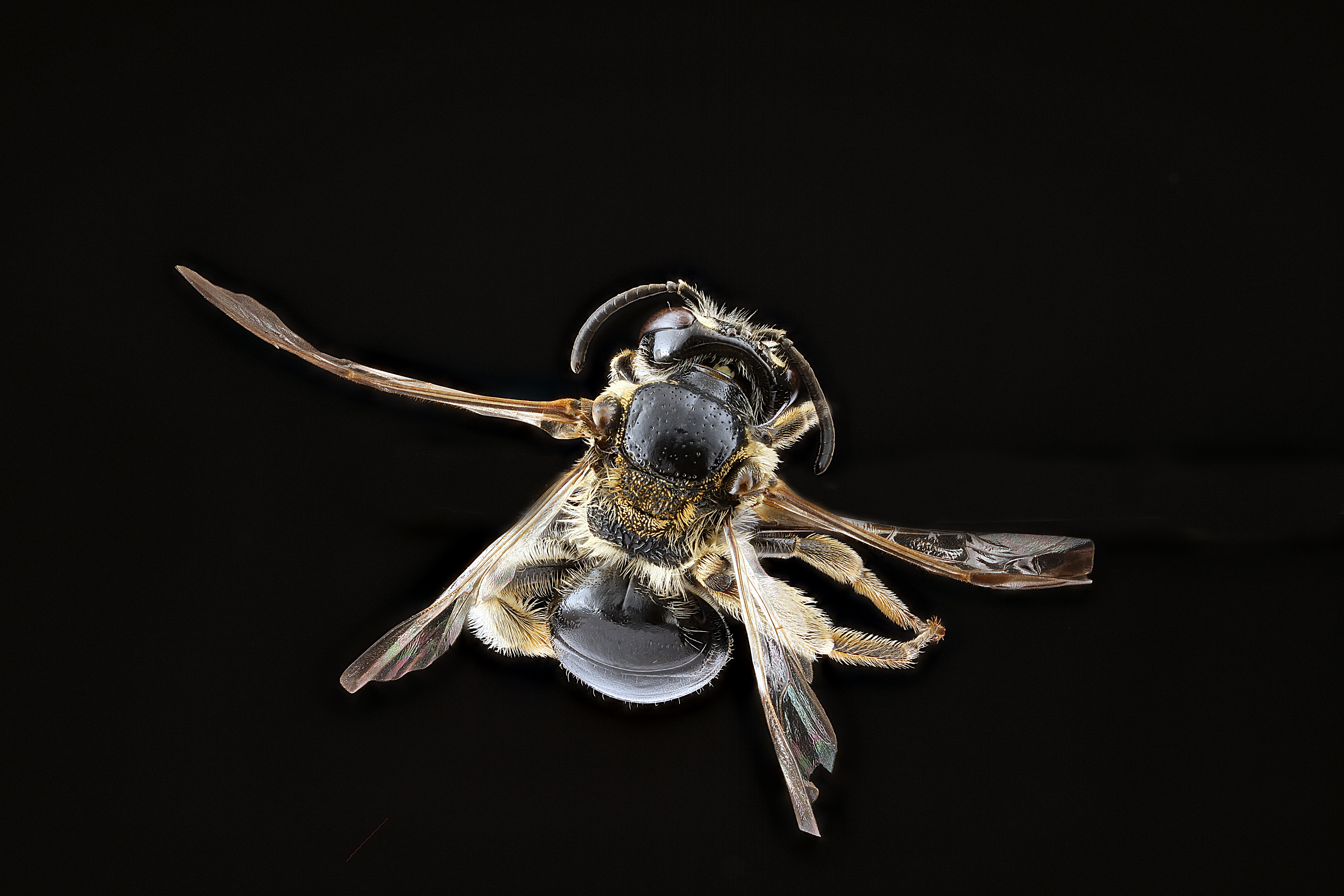

Scientific classification
- Domain: Eukaryota
- Kingdom: Animalia
- Phylum: Arthropoda
- Class: Insecta
- Order: Hymenoptera
- Family: Andrenidae
- Genus: Andrena
- Species: A. nuda

Binomial name
- Andrena nuda Robertson, 1891

= Andrena nuda =

Species of bee

The naked miner bee (Andrena nuda) is a species of miner bee in the family Andrenidae. Another common name for this species is the nude andrena. It is found in North America.
