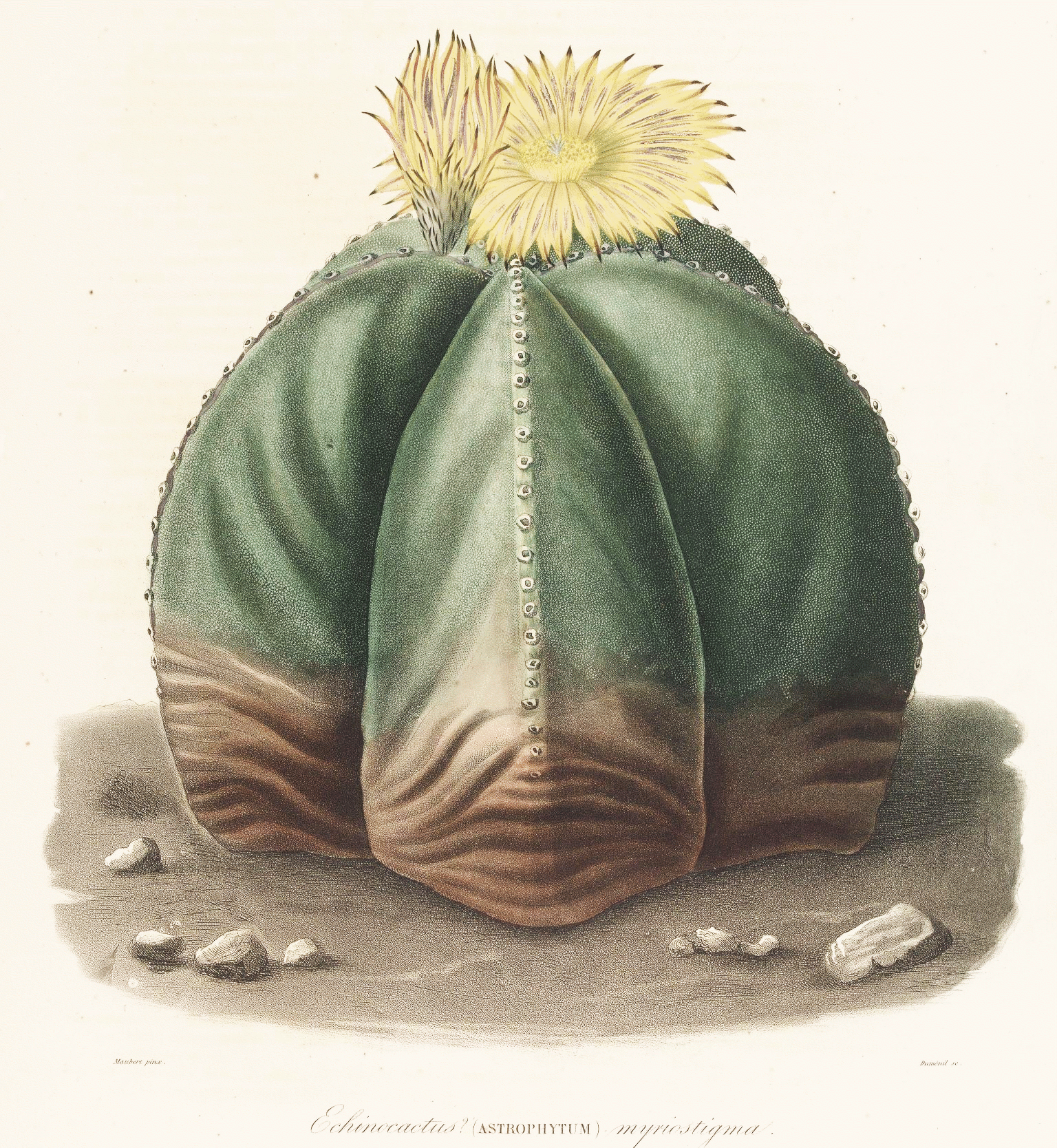

Conservation status
- Least Concern (IUCN 3.1)

Scientific classification
- Kingdom: Plantae
- Clade: Tracheophytes
- Clade: Angiosperms
- Clade: Eudicots
- Order: Caryophyllales
- Family: Cactaceae
- Subfamily: Cactoideae
- Genus: Astrophytum
- Species: A. myriostigma

Binomial name
- Astrophytum myriostigma Lem.

Synonyms
- Echinocactus myriostigma; Astrophytum prismaticum; Astrophytum columnare; Astrophytum tulense; Astrophytum nuda

= Astrophytum myriostigma =

Species of plant

Astrophytum myriostigma, the bishop's cap cactus, bishop's hat or bishop's miter cactus, is a species of cactus native to the highlands of northeastern and central Mexico.

Synonyms include Echinocactus myriostigma, Astrophytum prismaticum, A. columnare, A. tulense, and A. nuda.

== Morphology ==
Astrophytum myriostigma is a spineless cactus defined by the presence of three to seven (usually five) pronounced vertical ribs which define the cactus' shape when young (the genus name "astrophytum", literally, "star plant", is derived from the resulting star-like shape). As the cactus ages, more ribs may be added and it becomes more cylindrical in shape, growing up to about 70–100 cm (2 ft 4 in – 3 ft 3 in) tall and 10–20 cm (4–8 in) in diameter. In the wild, globose to cylindrical stem is covered with a whitish flocking of trichomes. Some horticultural varieties lack the flocking.

== Life cycle ==
In the wild, the cacti flower in early spring, so that their seeds can grow with summer rains. In cultivation this differs, and the plants may flower in summer. Plants produce one or more flowers 4–6 cm (1.6–2.4 in) diameter near the apex; the numerous tepals are creamy yellow, sometimes with an orange or red base. Pollinated flowers develop into a hairy reddish fruit about 2–2.5 cm (0.8–1.0 in) in diameter. Plants may take up to six years to flower. A. myriostigma is commonly grown as an ornamental plant in cactus collections.

== Trivia ==
This plant has gained the Royal Horticultural Society's Award of Garden Merit.

== Gallery ==
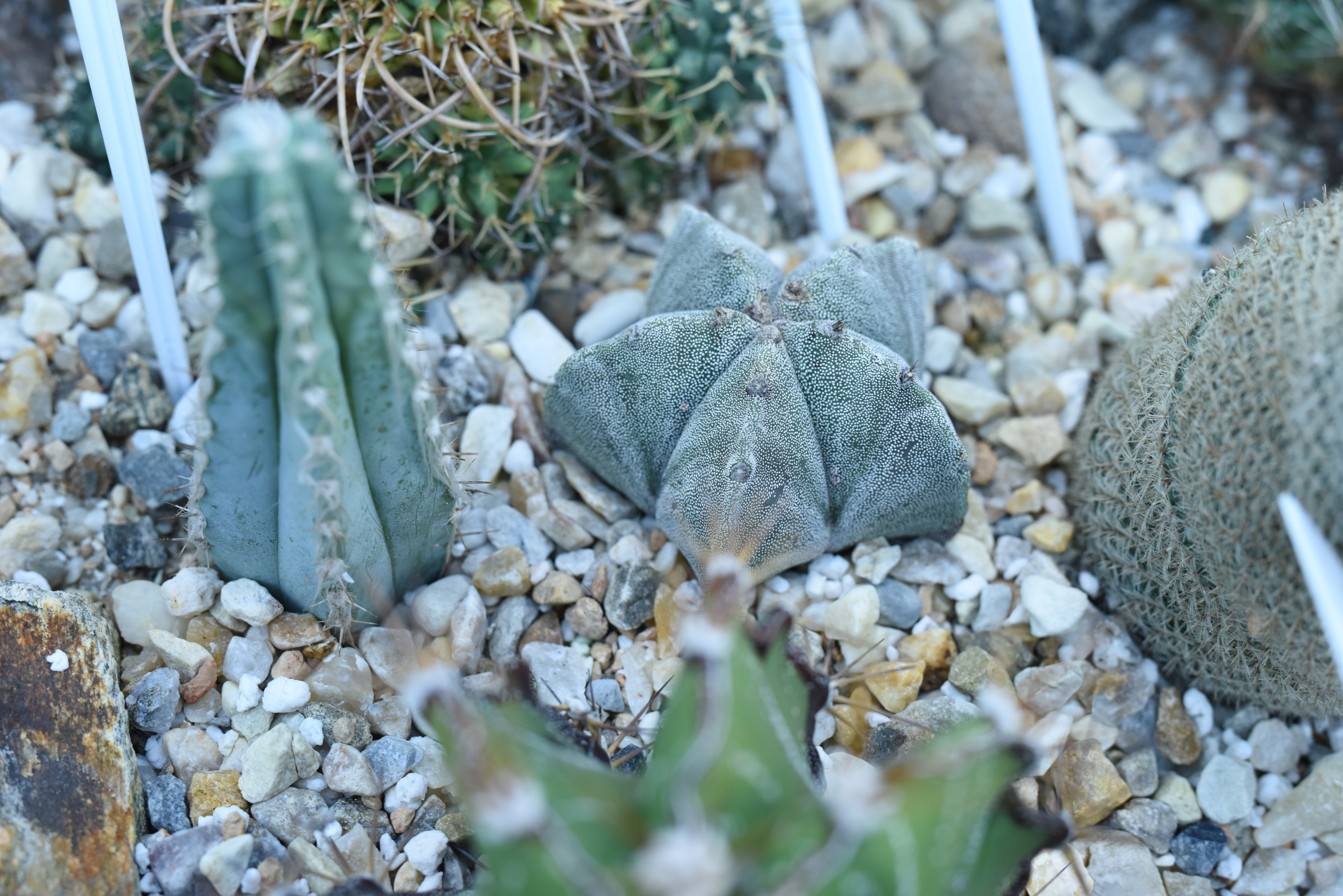

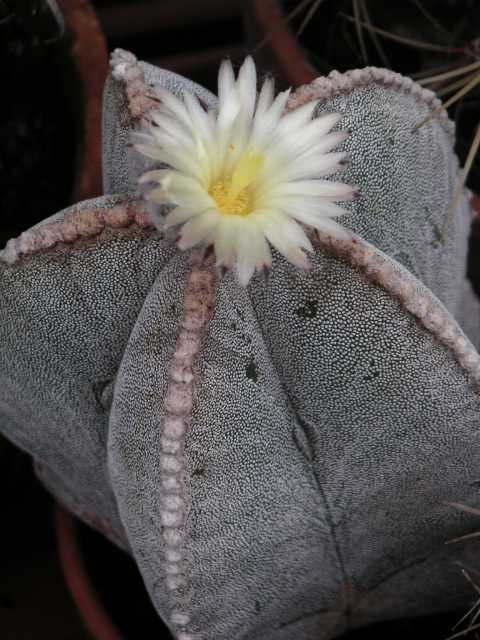

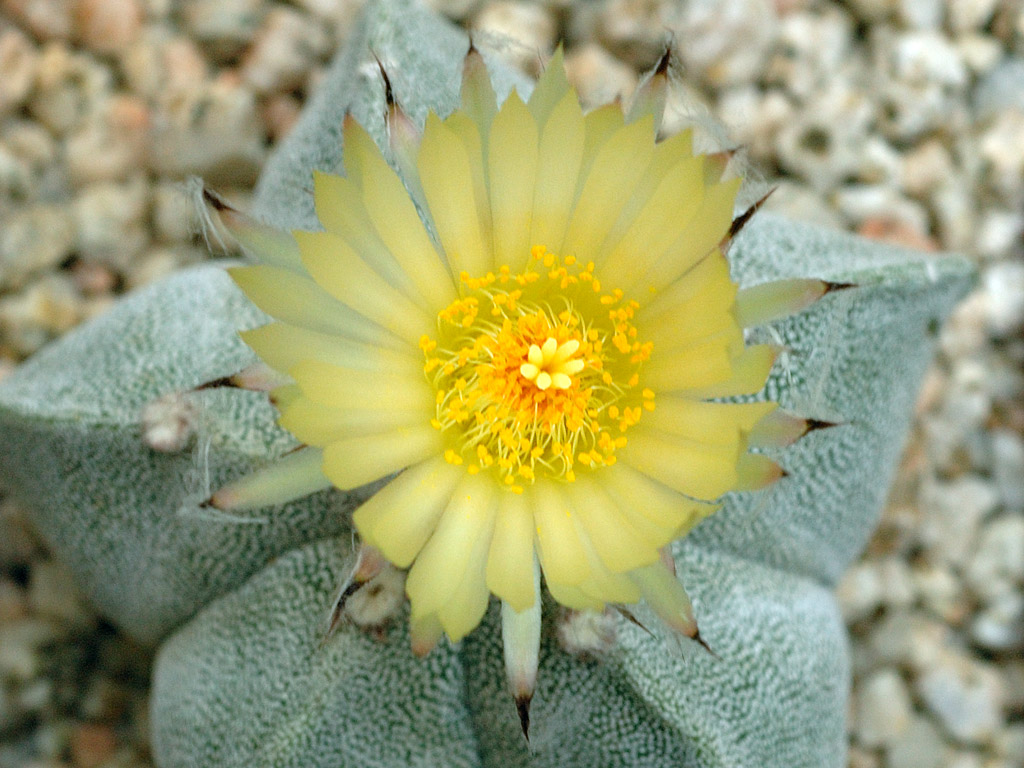

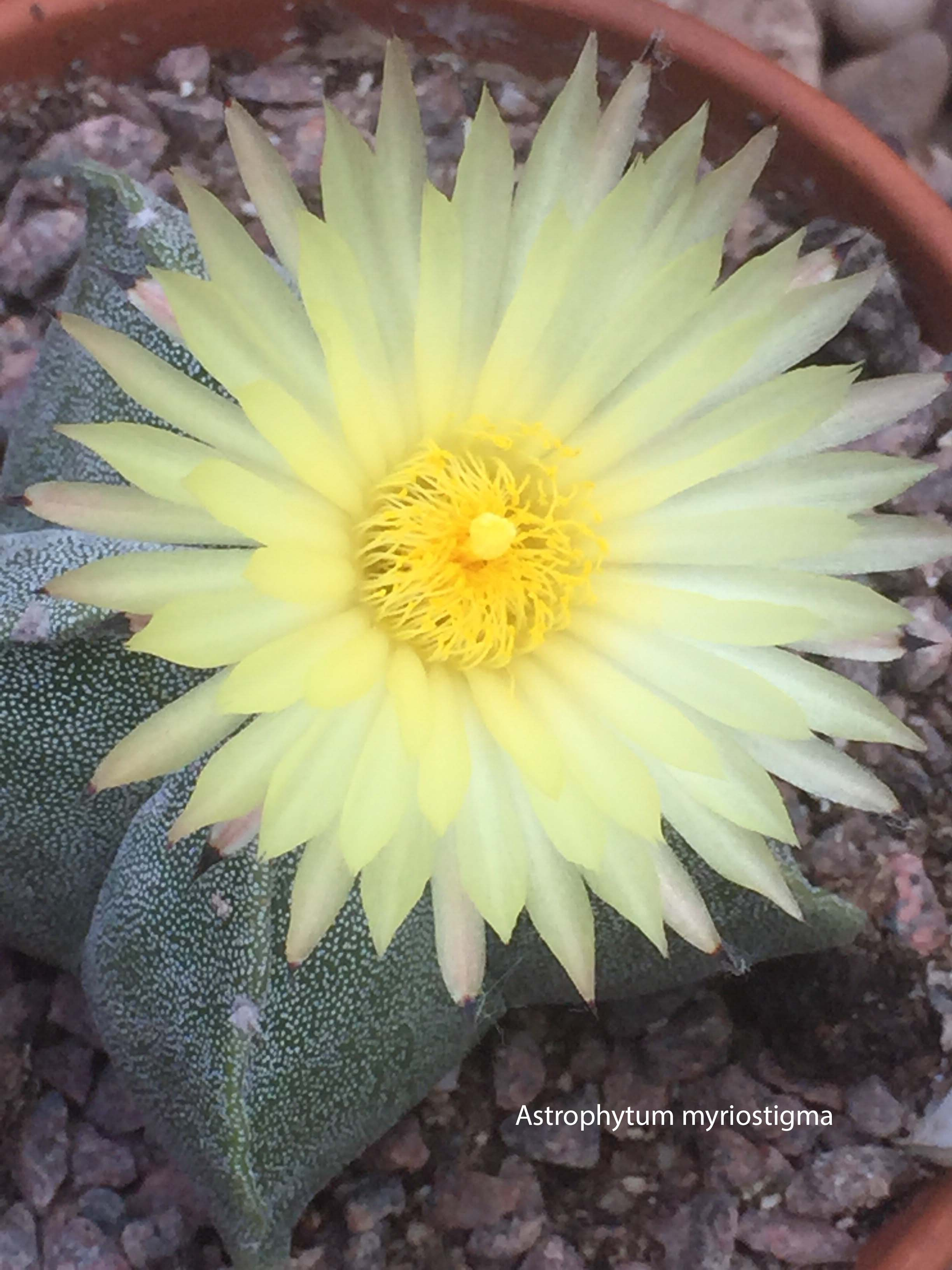

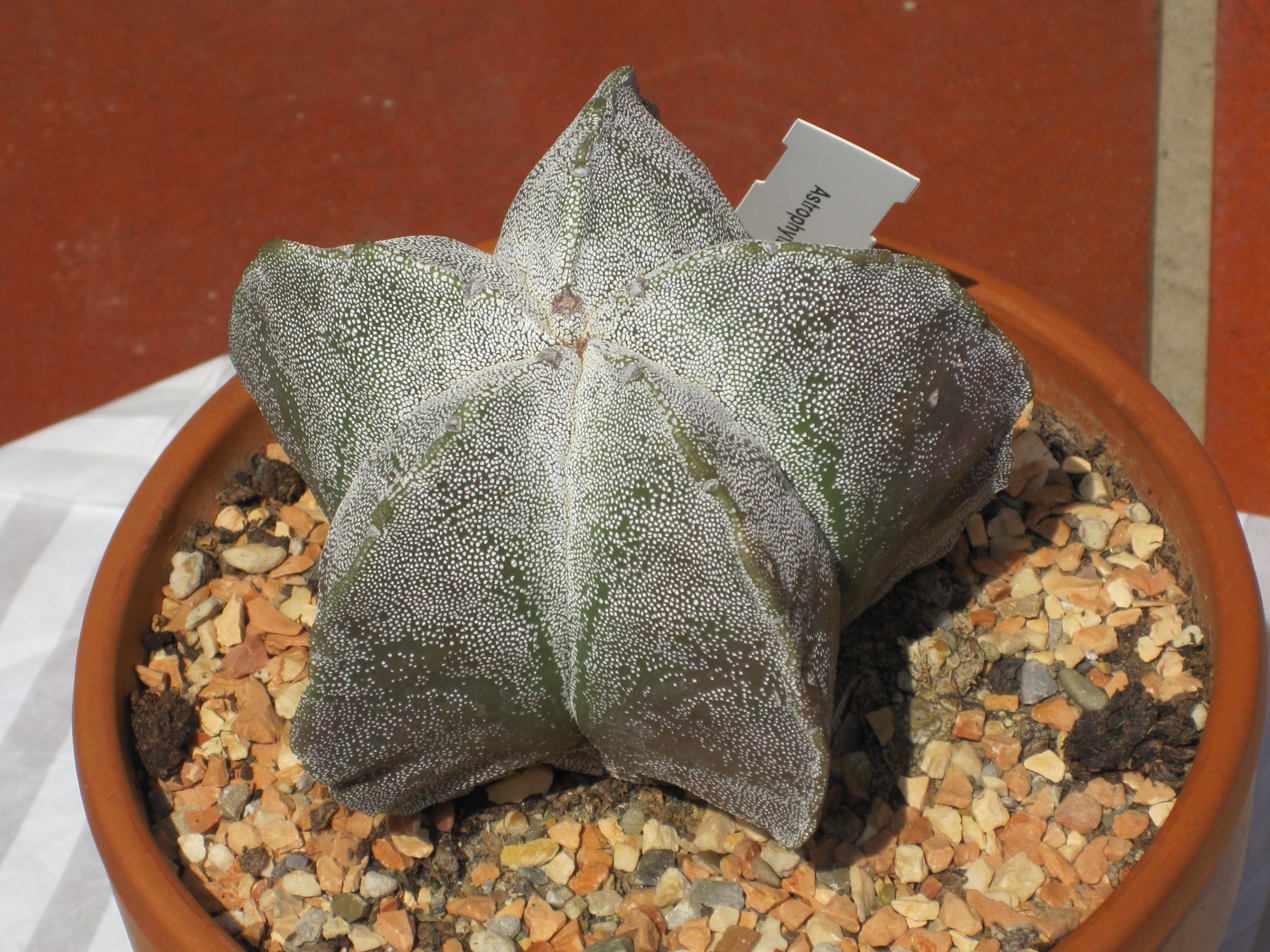

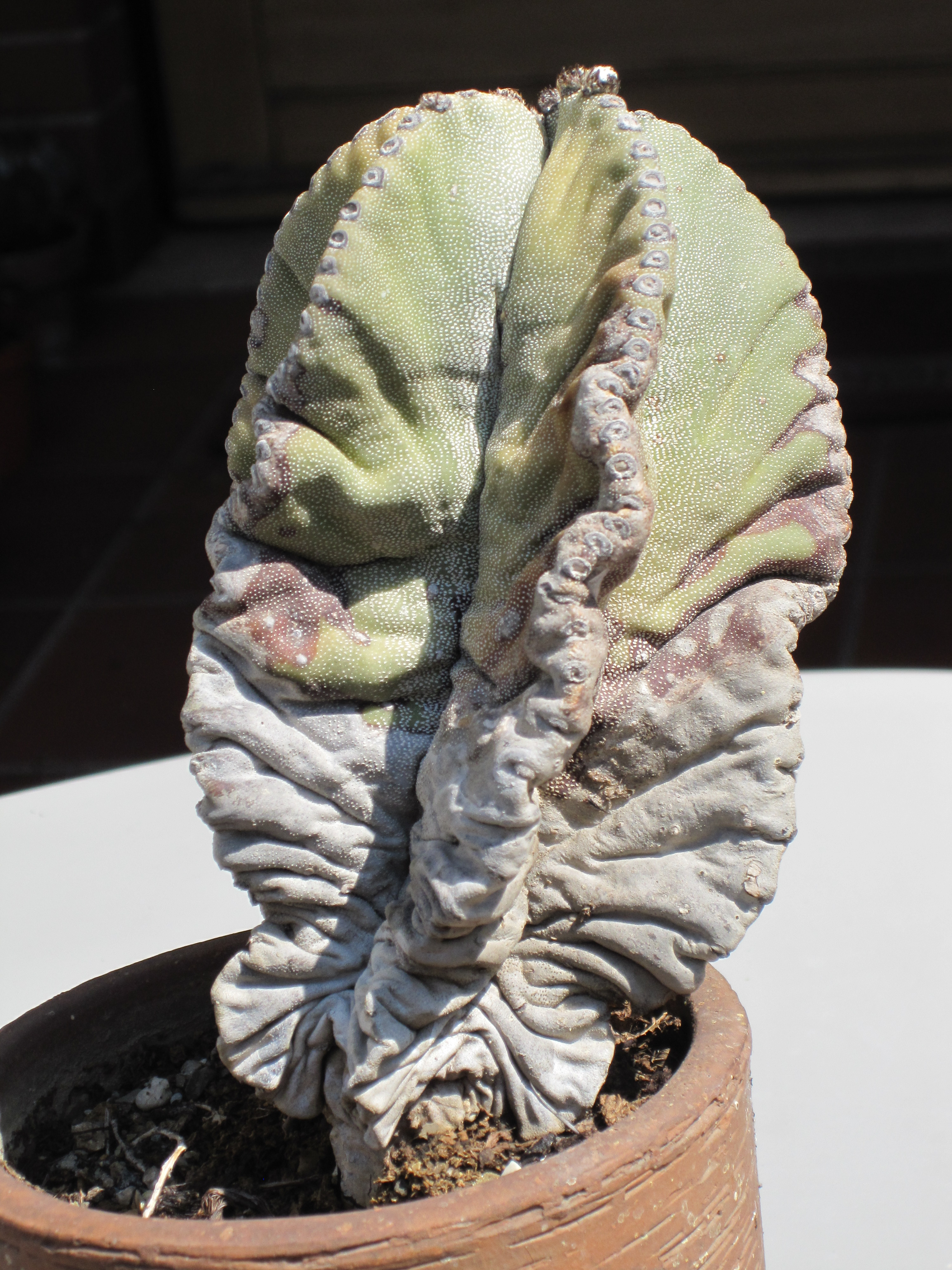
Old plant

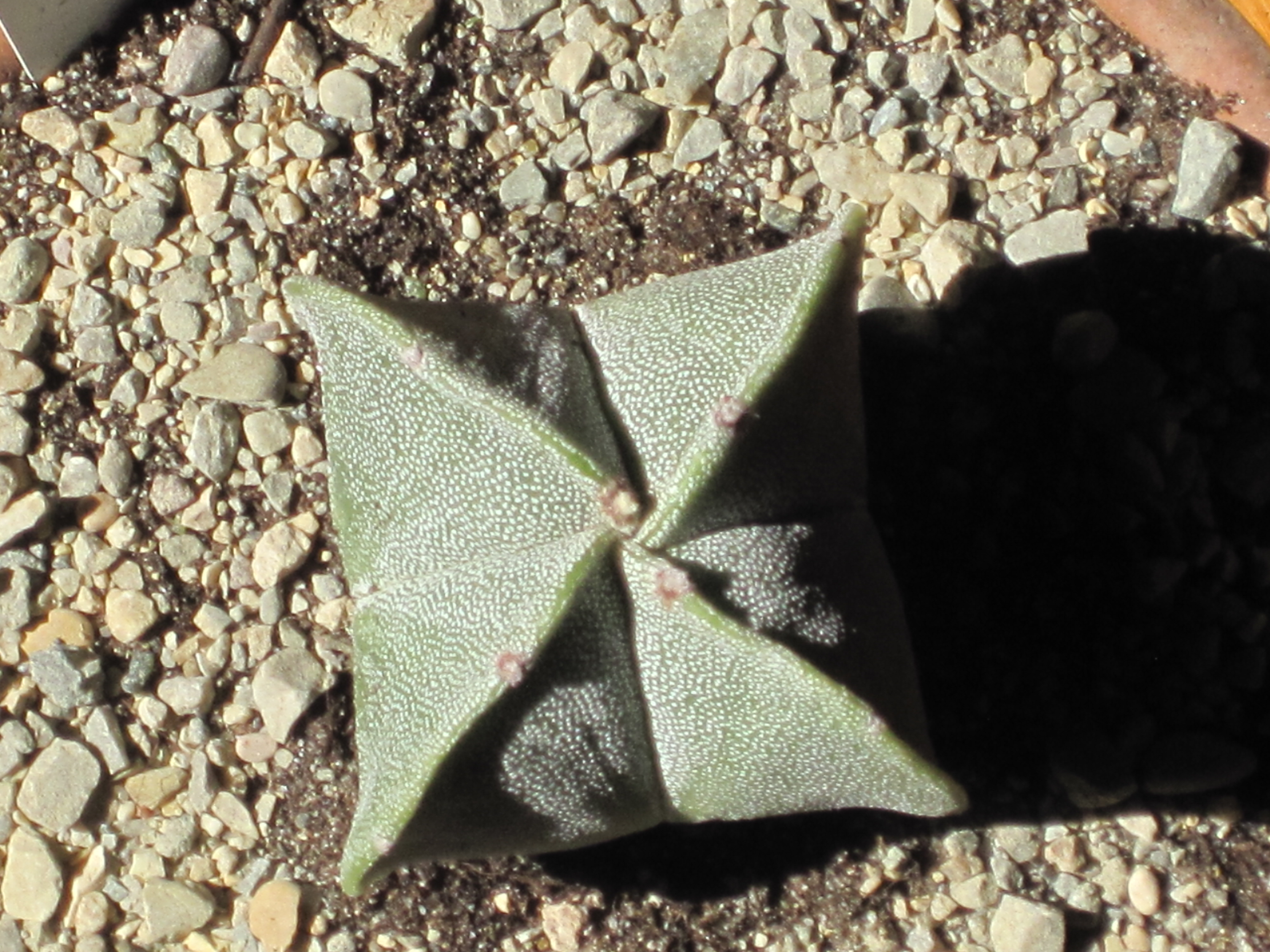
A. myriostigma var. quadricostatum

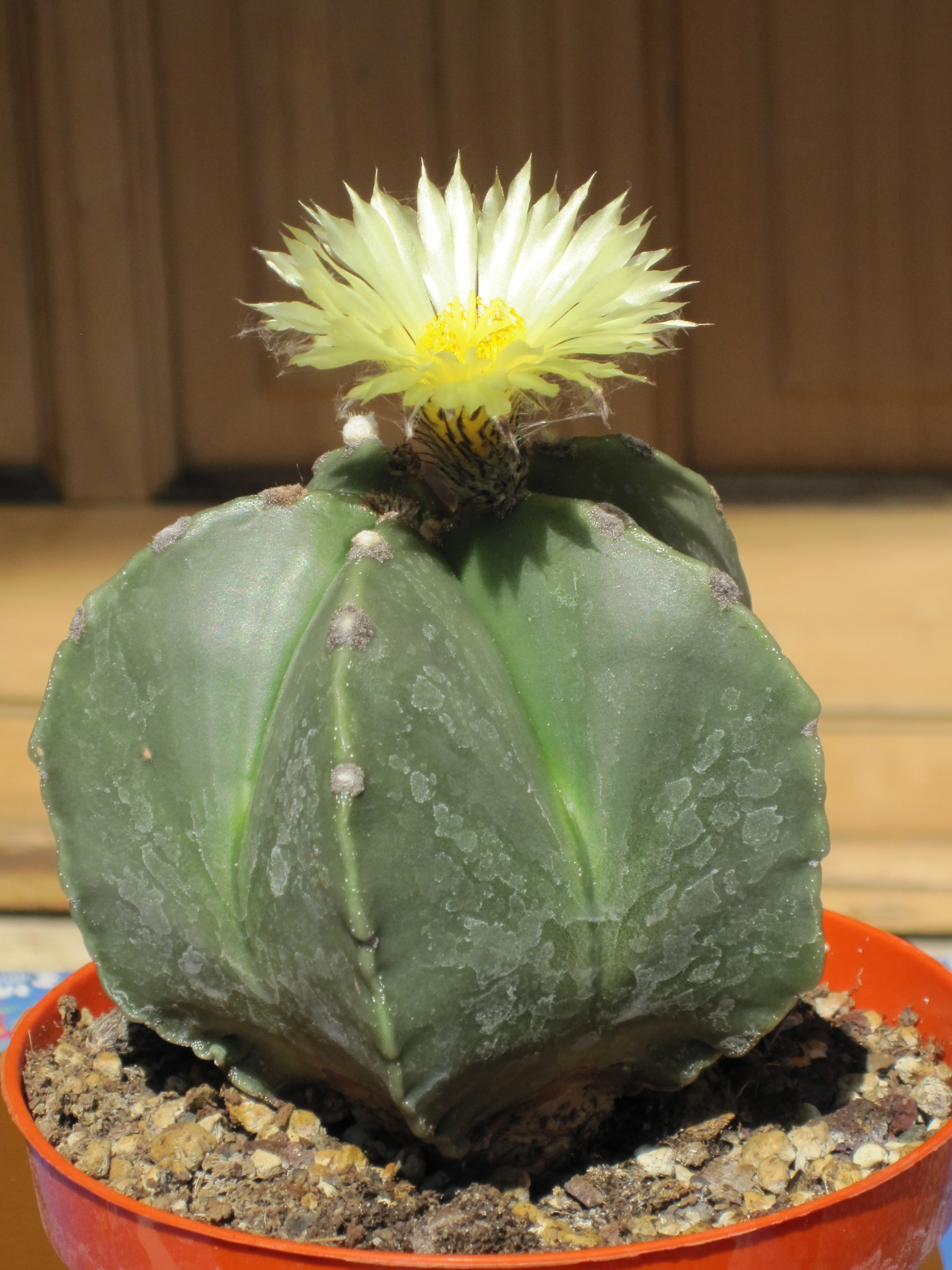
A. myriostigma var. nudum

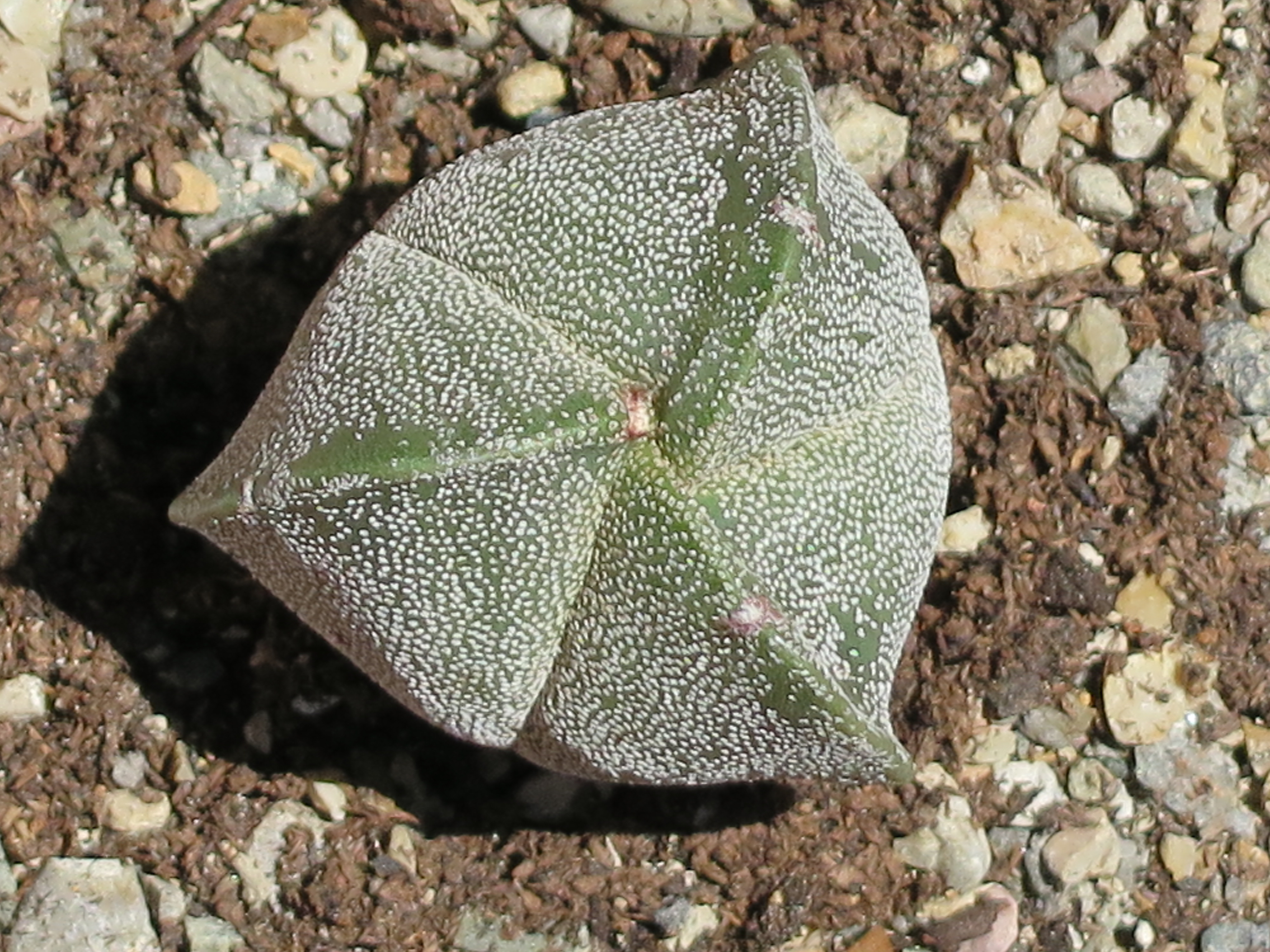
A. myriostigma var. tricostatum

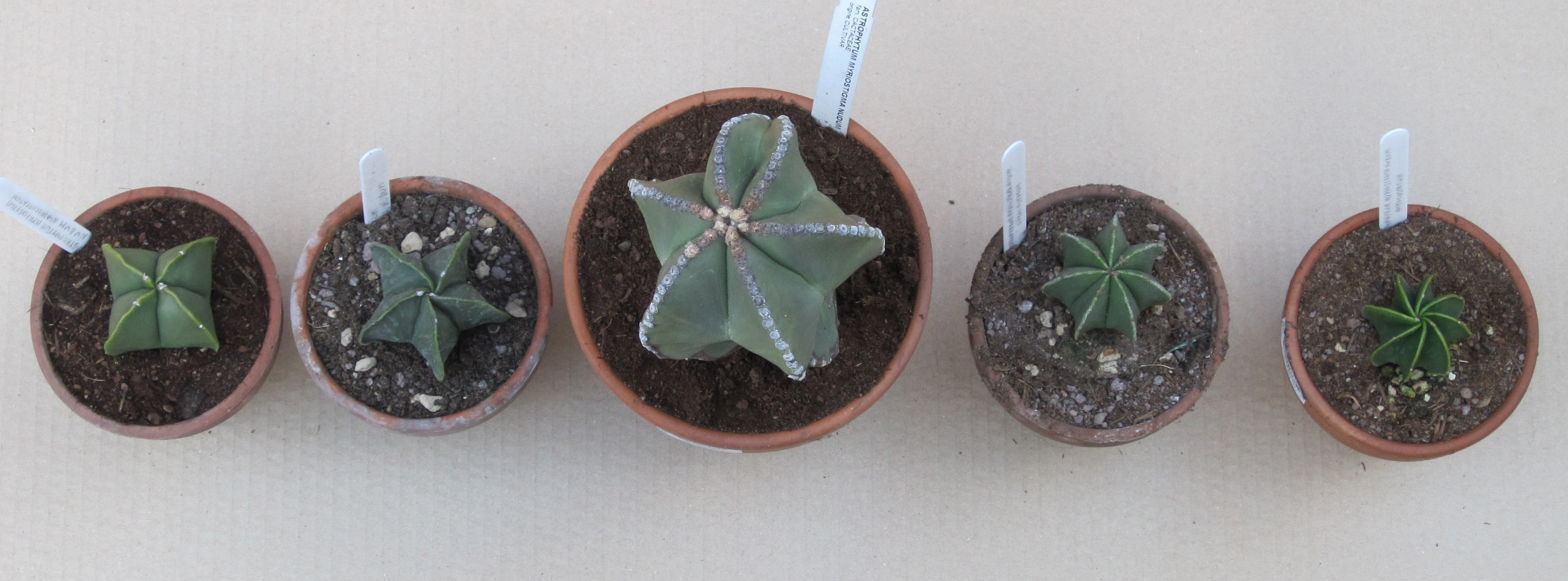
Astrophytum myriostigma nudum with 4,5,6,7,8 ribs

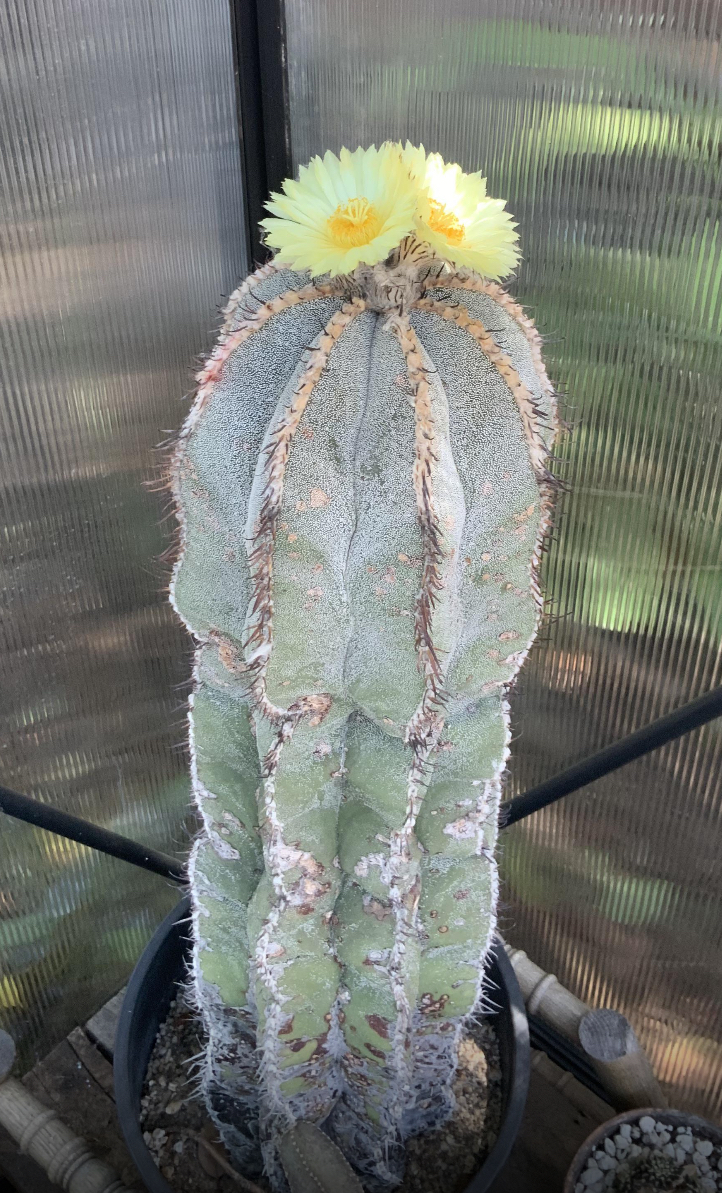
Huge plant
