= Anomoeotidae =

Scientific classification
- Domain: Eukaryota
- Kingdom: Animalia
- Phylum: Arthropoda
- Class: Insecta
- Order: Lepidoptera
- Superfamily: Zygaenoidea
- Family: Anomoeotidae; Hering, 1937

Genera
- See text.

Family of moths

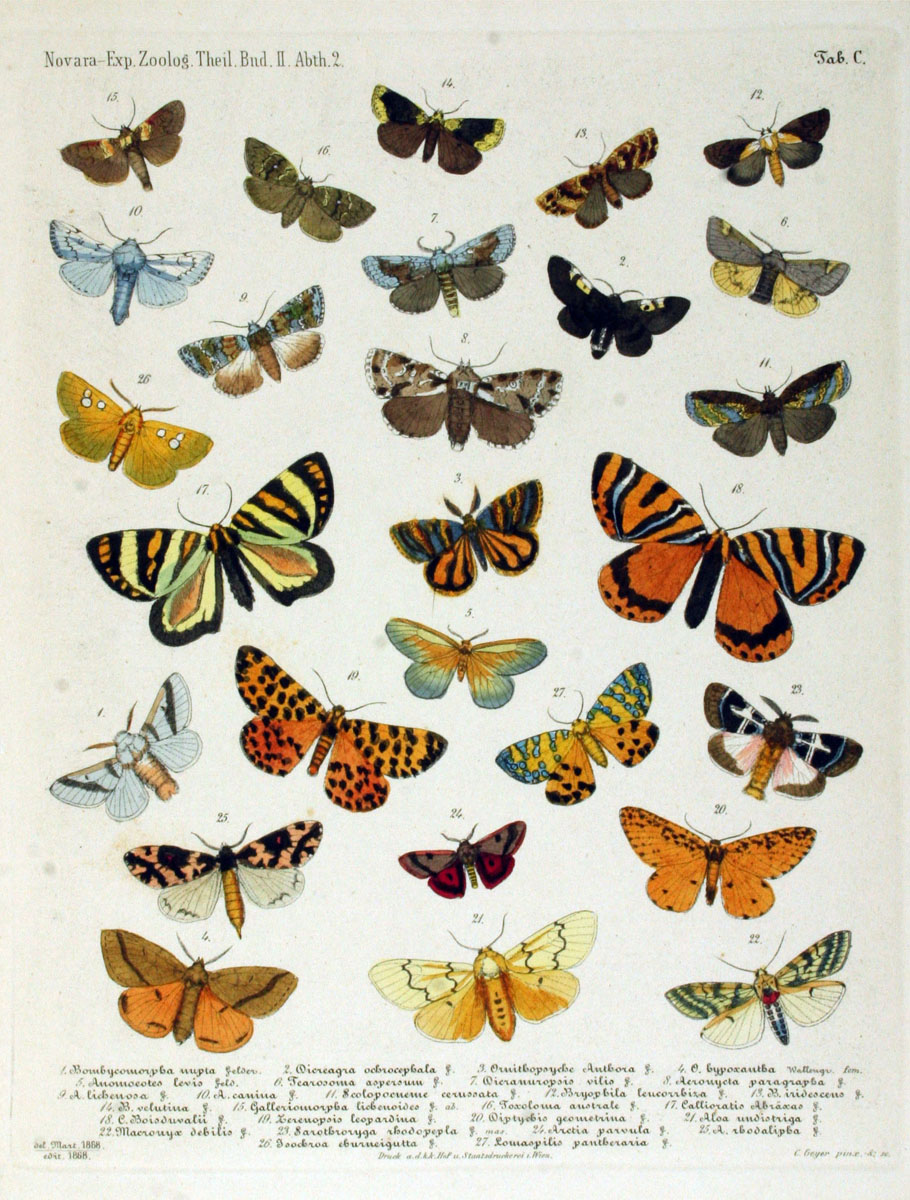

The Anomoeotidae are a family of moths in the order Lepidoptera of about 40 species, with Afrotropical and Oriental distribution.

== Genera ==
- Akesina
- Anomoeotes
- Dianeura
- Staphylinochrous
- Thermochrous
