= List of moths of Uganda =

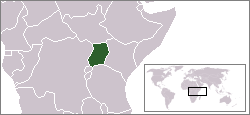
Location of Uganda

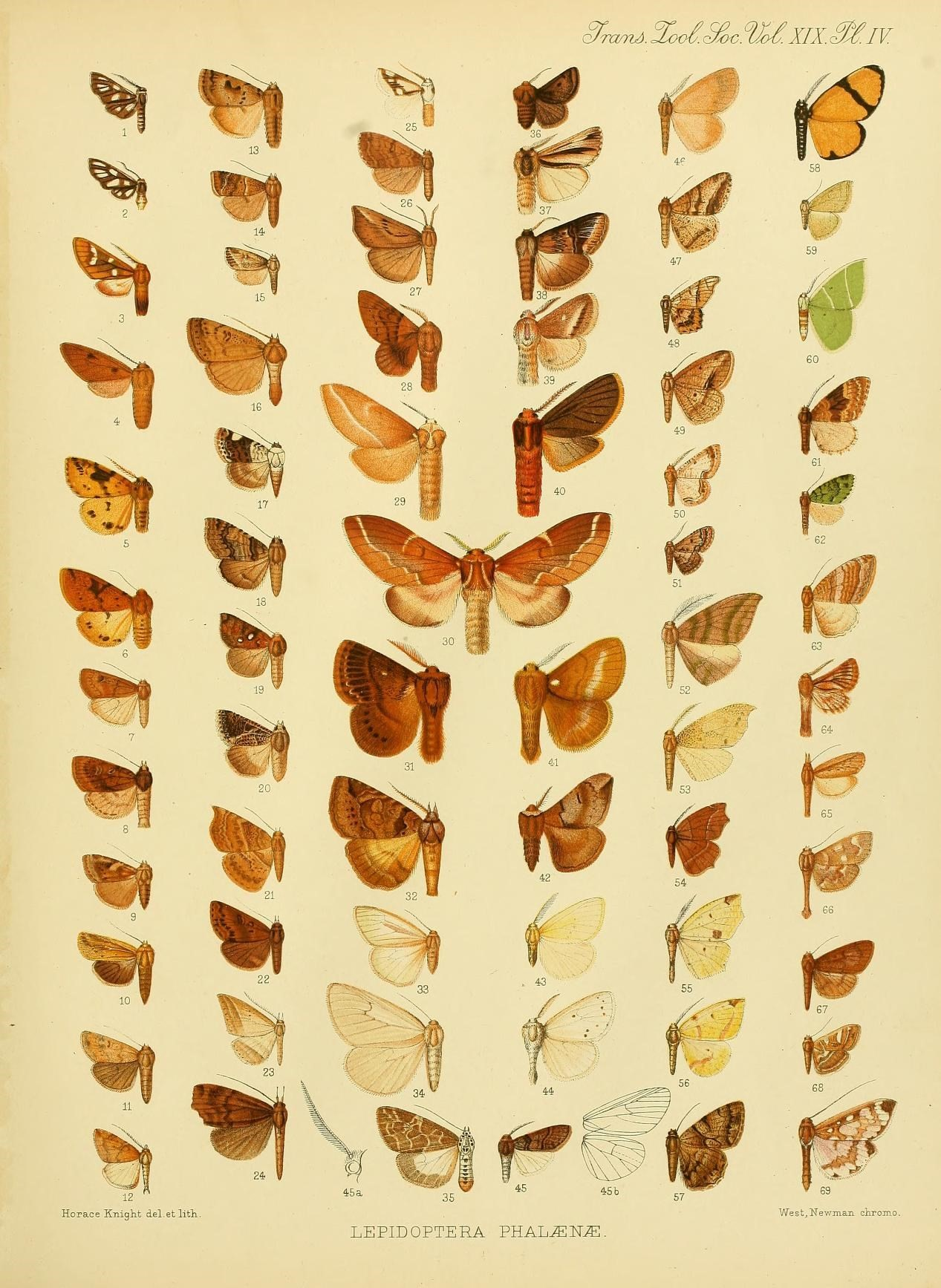
Illustration of Lepidoptera species collected during the Ruwenzori Expedition 1905-1906.

There are about 1,400 known moth species of Uganda. The moths (mostly nocturnal) and butterflies (mostly diurnal) together make up the taxonomic order Lepidoptera.

This is a list of moth species which have been recorded in Uganda.

== Alucitidae ==
- Alucita dohertyi (Walsingham, 1909)
- Alucita loxoschista (Meyrick, 1931)
- Alucita molliflua (Meyrick, 1927)

== Anomoeotidae ==
- Staphylinochrous euryperalis Hampson, 1910
- Staphylinochrous flavida Hampson, 1920
- Staphylinochrous melanoleuca Hampson, 1910

== Arctiidae ==
- Acantharctia ansorgei Rothschild, 1910
- Acantharctia atriramosa Hampson, 1907
- Acantharctia aurivillii Bartel, 1903
- Acantharctia flavicosta (Hampson, 1900)
- Acantharctia latifusca (Hampson, 1907)
- Acantharctia metaleuca Hampson, 1901
- Acantharctia mundata (Walker, 1865)
- Afraloa bifurca (Walker, 1855)
- Afrasura hieroglyphica (Bethune-Baker, 1911)
- Afrasura indecisa (Walker, 1869)
- Afrasura neavi (Hampson, 1914)
- Afrasura obliterata (Walker, 1864)
- Afrasura peripherica (Strand, 1912)
- Afrasura rivulosa (Walker, 1854)
- Afrasura submarmorata (Kiriakoff, 1958)
- Afrasura violacea (Cieslak & Häuser, 2006)
- Afroarctia kenyana (Rothschild, 1933)
- Afrospilarctia lucida (Druce, 1898)
- Aglossosia flavimarginata Hampson, 1900
- Alpenus investigatorum (Karsch, 1898)
- Alpenus maculosa (Stoll, 1781)
- Alpenus nigropunctata (Bethune-Baker, 1908)
- Alpenus pardalina (Rothschild, 1910)
- Alpenus schraderi (Rothschild, 1910)
- Amata basithyris Hampson, 1914
- Amata cerbera (Linnaeus, 1764)
- Amata cuprizonata (Hampson, 1901)
- Amata cyanea Hampson, 1914
- Amata jacksoni Rothschild, 1910
- Amata kenredi (Rothschild, 1910)
- Amata marina (Butler, 1876)
- Amata monothyris Hampson, 1914
- Amata nigrobasalis Rothschild, 1910
- Amata ntebi (Bethune-Baker, 1911)
- Amata phaeobasis (Hampson, 1907)
- Amata rubritincta (Hampson, 1903)
- Amata tomasina (Butler, 1876)
- Amata xanthopleura Hampson, 1914
- Amerila atrivena (Hampson, 1907)
- Amerila brunnea (Hampson, 1901)
- Amerila bubo (Walker, 1855)
- Amerila fuscivena (Hampson, 1916)
- Amerila luteibarba (Hampson, 1901)
- Amerila nigrivenosa (Grünberg, 1910)
- Amerila niveivitrea (Bartel, 1903)
- Amerila pannosa (Grünberg, 1908)
- Amerila puella (Fabricius, 1793)
- Amerila thermochroa (Hampson, 1916)
- Amphicallia bellatrix (Dalman, 1823)
- Amphicallia pactolicus (Butler, 1888)
- Amphicallia thelwalli (Druce, 1882)
- Anapisa endoxantha Hampson, 1914
- Anapisa melaleuca (Holland, 1898)
- Anapisa metarctioides (Hampson, 1907)
- Apisa metarctiodes Hampson, 1907
- Archilema cinderella (Kiriakoff, 1958)
- Archilema modiolus (Kiriakoff, 1958)
- Archithosia discors (Kiriakoff, 1958)
- Archithosia tryphosa (Kiriakoff, 1858)
- Argina amanda (Boisduval, 1847)
- Argina leonina (Walker, 1865)
- Asura friederikeae Kühne, 2007
- Asura mutabilis Kühne, 2007
- Asura pectinella Strand, 1922
- Asura pinkurata Kühne, 2007
- Asurgylla collenettei Kiriakoff, 1958
- Balacra batesi Druce, 1910
- Balacra compsa (Jordan, 1904)
- Balacra diaphana Kiriakoff, 1957
- Balacra elegans Aurivillius, 1892
- Balacra flavimacula Walker, 1856
- Balacra pulchra Aurivillius, 1892
- Balacra rattrayi (Rothschild, 1910)
- Balacra rubricincta Holland, 1893
- Balacra rubrostriata (Aurivillius, 1892)
- Binna scita (Walker, 1865)
- Carcinarctia rufa Joicey & Talbot, 1921
- Caripodia chrysargyria Hampson, 1900
- Caryatis stenoperas Hampson, 1910
- Ceryx cybelistes (Holland, 1893)
- Ceryx semihyalina Kirby, 1896
- Cragia adiastola (Kiriakoff, 1958)
- Cragia distigmata (Hampson, 1901)
- Cragia quadrinotata (Walker, 1864)
- Creatonotos leucanioides Holland, 1893
- Cyana flammeostrigata Karisch, 2003
- Cyana margarethae (Kiriakoff, 1958)
- Cyana rejecta (Walker, 1854)
- Cyana ruwenzoriana Karisch, 2003
- Cyana ugandana (Strand, 1912)
- Disparctia varicolor Toulgoët, 1978
- Disparctia vittata (Druce, 1898)
- Dubatolovia neurophaea (Hampson, 1911)
- Eilema debilissima Kiriakoff, 1958
- Eilema gracilipennis (Wallengren, 1860)
- Eilema mesosticta Hampson, 1911
- Eilema rufitincta (Hampson, 1914)
- Epilacydes bayoni (Berio, 1935)
- Epitoxis albicincta Hampson, 1903
- Epitoxis ansorgei Rothschild, 1910
- Epitoxis procridia Hampson, 1898
- Eressa africana Hampson, 1914
- Estigmene ansorgei Rothschild, 1910
- Estigmene ochreomarginata Bethune-Baker, 1909
- Estigmene tenuistrigata (Hampson, 1900)
- Euchromia guineensis (Fabricius, 1775)
- Euchromia jacksoni Bethune-Baker, 1911
- Eurozonosia fulvinigra Hampson, 1914
- Exilisia tripuncta (Kiriakoff, 1958)
- Eyralpenus scioana (Oberthür, 1880)
- Galtara aurivilii (Pagenstecher, 1901)
- Galtara doriae (Oberthür, 1880)
- Galtara reticulata (Hampson, 1909)
- Hippurarctia ferrigera (Druce, 1910)
- Ilemodes astriga Hampson, 1916
- Ilemodes heterogyna Hampson, 1900
- Kiriakoffalia costimacula (Joicey & Talbot, 1924)
- Lepista pandula (Boisduval, 1847)
- Mecistorhabdia haematoessa (Holland, 1893)
- Meganaclia sippia (Plötz, 1880)
- Melisa hancocki Jordan, 1936
- Metarctia burra (Schaus & Clements, 1893)
- Metarctia flaviciliata Hampson, 1907
- Metarctia flavicincta Aurivillius, 1900
- Metarctia flavivena Hampson, 1901
- Metarctia fulvia Hampson, 1901
- Metarctia fusca Hampson, 1901
- Metarctia haematica Holland, 1893
- Metarctia lateritia Herrich-Schäffer, 1855
- Metarctia pulverea Hampson, 1907
- Metarctia pumila Hampson, 1909
- Metarctia rubripuncta Hampson, 1898
- Metarctia sarcosoma Hampson, 1901
- Metarctia tricolorana Wichgraf, 1922
- Micralarctia punctulatum (Wallengren, 1860)
- Muxta xanthopa (Holland, 1893)
- Myopsyche xanthosoma Hampson, 1907
- Nacliodes microsippia Strand, 1912
- Nanna eningae (Plötz, 1880)
- Neuroxena ansorgei Kirby, 1896
- Nyctemera apicalis (Walker, 1854)
- Nyctemera chalcosidia (Hampson, 1910)
- Nyctemera glauce (Fawcett, 1916)
- Nyctemera itokina (Aurivillius, 1904)
- Nyctemera leuconoe Hopffer, 1857
- Nyctemera perspicua (Walker, 1854)
- Nyctemera rattrayi (Swinhoe, 1904)
- Nyctemera restrictum (Butler, 1894)
- Nyctemera ugandicola (Strand, 1909)
- Onychipodia straminea Hampson, 1914
- Ovenna guineacola (Strand, 1912)
- Ovenna vicaria (Walker, 1854)
- Palaeosiccia major (Kiriakoff, 1958)
- Paradoxosia rufipex Hampson, 1918
- Paralacydes decemmaculata (Rothschild, 1916)
- Paralpenus ugandae (Hampson, 1916)
- Paramelisa lophura Aurivillius, 1905
- Pericaliella melanodisca (Hampson, 1907)
- Phryganopsis angulifascia (Strand, 1912)
- Phryganopsis punctilineata (Hampson, 1901)
- Phryganopsis tryphosa Kiriakoff, 1958
- Popoudina pamphilia Kiriakoff, 1958
- Pseudothyretes erubescens (Hampson, 1901)
- Pseudothyretes kamitugensis (Dufrane, 1945)
- Pseudothyretes perpusilla (Walker, 1856)
- Pseudothyretes rubicundula (Strand, 1912)
- Psichotoe rubridorsata Berio, 1940
- Pusiola edwardsi (Kiriakoff, 1958)
- Pusiola hemiphaea (Hampson, 1909)
- Pusiola minutissima (Kiriakoff, 1958)
- Pusiola poliosia (Kiriakoff, 1958)
- Pusiola roscidella (Kiriakoff, 1954)
- Pusiola sorghicolor (Kiriakoff, 1954)
- Pusiola straminea (Hampson, 1901)
- Pusiola tinaeella (Kiriakoff, 1958)
- Radiarctia jacksoni (Rothschild, 1910)
- Radiarctia lutescens (Walker, 1854)
- Radiarctia rhodesiana (Hampson, 1900)
- Rhabdomarctia rubrilineata (Bethune-Baker, 1911)
- Rhipidarctia crameri Kiriakoff, 1961
- Rhipidarctia forsteri (Kiriakoff, 1953)
- Rhipidarctia pareclecta (Holland, 1893)
- Secusio deilemera Talbot, 1929
- Secusio drucei Rothschild, 1933
- Secusio mania Druce, 1887
- Secusio strigata Walker, 1854
- Seydelia ellioti (Butler, 1895)
- Siccia adiaphora Kiriakoff, 1958
- Siccia cretata Hampson, 1914
- Siccia duodecimpunctata Kiriakoff, 1958
- Siccia pallens Hampson, 1918
- Spilosoma atridorsia Hampson, 1920
- Spilosoma curvilinea Walker, 1855
- Spilosoma holoxantha (Hampson, 1907)
- Spilosoma karschi Bartel, 1903
- Spilosoma pales (Druce, 1910)
- Spilosoma rava (Druce, 1898)
- Spilosoma sublutescens Kiriakoff, 1958
- Spilosoma sulphurea Bartel, 1903
- Spilosoma unipuncta (Hampson, 1905)
- Stenarctia abdominalis Rothschild, 1910
- Stenarctia quadripunctata Aurivillius, 1900
- Teracotona approximans (Rothschild, 1917)
- Teracotona euprepia Hampson, 1900
- Teracotona melanocera (Hampson, 1920)
- Teracotona pardalina Bartel, 1903
- Teracotona translucens (Grünberg, 1907)
- Teracotona wittei (Debauche, 1942)
- Tesma melema (Kiriakoff, 1958)
- Thumatha kakamegae Kühne, 2007
- Utetheisa pulchella (Linnaeus, 1758)

== Brahmaeidae ==
- Dactyloceras lucina (Drury, 1872)

== Carposinidae ==
- Carposina euschema Bradley, 1965
- Carposina mesophaea Bradley, 1965
- Carposina poliophara Bradley, 1965
- Carposina scierotoxa Meyrick, 1924

== Choreutidae ==
- Brenthia gamicopis Meyrick, 1930
- Choreutis aegyptiaca (Zeller, 1867)
- Choreutis agelasta Bradley, 1965
- Choreutis pychnomochla Bradley, 1965

== Cosmopterigidae ==
- Anatrachyntis rileyi (Walsingham, 1882)

== Cossidae ==
- Azygophleps albovittata Bethune-Baker, 1908
- Azygophleps mediopallens D. S. Fletcher, 1968
- Azygophleps nubilosa Hampson, 1910

== Crambidae ==
- Adelpherupa flavescens Hampson, 1919
- Aethaloessa floridalis (Zeller, 1852)
- Agathodes musivalis Guenée, 1854
- Ancylolomia chrysographellus (Kollar, 1844)
- Ancylolomia fulvitinctalis Hampson, 1919
- Ancylolomia perfasciata Hampson, 1919
- Bissetia poliella (Hampson, 1919)
- Cadarena sinuata (Fabricius, 1781)
- Calamoschoena nigripunctalis Hampson, 1919
- Chilo mesoplagalis (Hampson, 1919)
- Cnaphalocrocis trapezalis (Guenée, 1854)
- Cotachena smaragdina (Butler, 1875)
- Diasemia lunalis Gaede, 1916
- Donacaula rufalis (Hampson, 1919)
- Glyphodes aniferalis Hampson, 1909
- Glyphodes stolalis Guenée, 1854
- Haimbachia subterminalis (Hampson, 1919)
- Palpita metallata (Fabricius, 1781)
- Palpita unionalis (Hübner, 1796)
- Patissa fractilinealis Hampson, 1919
- Patissa fulvicepsalis Hampson, 1919
- Patissa fulvipunctalis Hampson, 1919
- Patissa geminalis Hampson, 1919
- Pediasia melanerges (Hampson, 1919)
- Pilocrocis laralis Hampson, 1909
- Pilocrocis patagialis Hampson, 1909
- Pilocrocis pterygodia Hampson, 1912
- Polygrammodes phyllophila (Butler, 1878)
- Polythlipta distinguenda Grünberg, 1910
- Polythlipta guttiferalis Hampson, 1909
- Psara bipunctalis (Fabricius, 1794)
- Psara cryptolepis (Martin, 1956)
- Pyrausta fulvilinealis Hampson, 1918
- Pyrausta gazalis Hampson, 1913
- Stemorrhages sericea (Drury, 1773)
- Stenocalama ochrotis Hampson, 1919
- Syllepte nyanzana (Grünberg, 1910)
- Syllepte ovialis (Walker, 1859)
- Zebronia phenice (Cramer, 1780)

== Drepanidae ==
- Epicampoptera andersoni (Tams, 1925)
- Epicampoptera heterogyna (Hampson, 1914)
- Epicampoptera marantica (Tams, 1930)
- Epicampoptera strandi Bryk, 1913
- Gonoreta albiapex Watson, 1965
- Gonoreta angulosa Watson, 1965
- Gonoreta cymba Watson, 1965
- Gonoreta forcipulata Watson, 1965
- Gonoreta opacifinis Watson, 1965
- Isospidia angustipennis (Warren, 1904)
- Negera natalensis (Felder, 1874)
- Negera quadricornis Watson, 1965
- Negera ramosa Watson, 1965
- Spidia fenestrata Butler, 1878
- Spidia goniata Watson, 1957
- Spidia smithi (Warren, 1902)
- Uranometra oculata (Holland, 1893)

== Elachistidae ==
- Elachista iriphaea (Meyrick, 1932)
- Elachista oritropha Bradley, 1965

== Eupterotidae ==
- Hoplojana roseobrunnea Rothschild, 1917
- Janomima dannfelti (Aurivillius, 1893)
- Phiala nigrolineata Aurivillius, 1903
- Phiala novemlineata Aurivillius, 1911
- Stenoglene roseus (Druce, 1886)
- Vianga crowleyi (Aurivillius, 1904)

== Gelechiidae ==
- Brachmia deltopis Meyrick, 1920
- Platyedra cunctatrix Meyrick, 1931
- Ptilothyris serangota Meyrick, 1932

== Geometridae ==
- Acanthovalva inconspicuaria (Hübner, 1796)
- Acollesis umbrata Warren, 1899
- Aletis erici Kirby, 1896
- Aletis helcita (Linnaeus, 1763)
- Ansorgia divergens Warren, 1899
- Antitrygodes callibotrys Prout, 1918
- Aphilopota calaria (Swinhoe, 1904)
- Aphilopota fletcheri Carcasson, 1965
- Archichlora ansorgei (Warren, 1901)
- Asthenotricha anisobapta Prout, 1932
- Asthenotricha ansorgei Warren, 1899
- Asthenotricha barnsae Prout, 1935
- Asthenotricha flavicoma Warren, 1899
- Asthenotricha inutilis Warren, 1901
- Asthenotricha proschora D. S. Fletcher, 1958
- Asthenotricha pycnoconia Janse, 1933
- Asthenotricha semidivisa Warren, 1901
- Asthenotricha serraticornis Warren, 1902
- Azyx consocia (Warren, 1899)
- Biston abruptaria (Walker, 1869)
- Biston edwardsi (Prout, 1938)
- Biston gloriosaria Karisch, 2005
- Blaboplutodes parvistictus Carcasson, 1965
- Cancellalata subumbrata D. S. Fletcher, 1956
- Cartaletis libyssa (Hopffer, 1857)
- Cartaletis variabilis (Butler, 1878)
- Centrochria aphthona (Prout, 1934)
- Chiasmia anguifera (Prout, 1934)
- Chiasmia assimilis (Warren, 1899)
- Chiasmia brongusaria (Walker, 1860)
- Chiasmia confuscata (Warren, 1899)
- Chiasmia curvilineata (Warren, 1899)
- Chiasmia dentilineata (Warren, 1899)
- Chiasmia fulvimargo (Warren, 1899)
- Chiasmia geminilinea (Prout, 1932)
- Chiasmia gyliura (Prout, 1932)
- Chiasmia maculosa (Warren, 1899)
- Chiasmia nana (Warren, 1898)
- Chiasmia observata (Walker, 1861)
- Chiasmia pervittata (Hampson, 1909)
- Chiasmia procidata (Guenée, 1858)
- Chiasmia rectistriaria (Herrich-Schäffer, 1854)
- Chiasmia semicolor (Warren, 1899)
- Chiasmia subcretata (Warren, 1905)
- Chiasmia subcurvaria (Mabille, 1897)
- Chiasmia trizonaria (Hampson, 1909)
- Chiasmia umbrata (Warren, 1897)
- Chiasmia umbratilis (Butler, 1875)
- Chiasmia unifilata (Warren, 1899)
- Chlorodrepana allevata Prout, 1915
- Cleora rostella D. S. Fletcher, 1967
- Coenina aurivena Butler, 1898
- Colocleora ankolensis Carcasson, 1965
- Colocleora hegemonica (Prout, 1932)
- Colocleora simulatrix (Warren, 1899)
- Comibaena biviaria Hampson, 1909
- Comostolopsis rubristicta (Warren, 1899)
- Comostolopsis tmematica Prout, 1934
- Conolophia rectistrigaria Rebel, 1914
- Derambila hyperphyes (Prout, 1911)
- Disclisioprocta natalata (Walker, 1862)
- Dithecodes brunneifrons (Hampson, 1909)
- Dithecodes delicata (Warren, 1899)
- Ecpetala carnifasciata (Warren, 1899)
- Ecpetala indentata (Warren, 1902)
- Ecpetala meridionata Walker, 1862
- Ecpetala obtusa (Warren, 1902)
- Ectropis anisa Prout, 1915
- Ectropis ocellata Warren, 1902
- Encoma irisaria Swinhoe, 1904
- Eois grataria (Walker, 1861)
- Eois laxipecten Herbulot, 2000
- Epicosymbia spectrum Prout, 1923
- Epigynopteryx curvimargo (Hampson, 1909)
- Epigynopteryx flavedinaria (Guenée, 1857)
- Epigynopteryx impunctata (Warren, 1898)
- Epigynopteryx nigricola (Warren, 1897)
- Epigynopteryx stictigramma (Hampson, 1909)
- Epigynopteryx subspersa (Warren, 1897)
- Epigynopteryx tabitha Warren, 1901
- Epigynopteryx termininota Prout, 1934
- Erastria albosignata (Walker, 1863)
- Erastria madecassaria (Boisduval, 1833)
- Eupithecia celatisigna (Warren, 1902)
- Eupithecia connexa (Warren, 1899)
- Eupithecia devestita (Warren, 1899)
- Eupithecia dilucida (Warren, 1899)
- Eupithecia dohertyi Prout, 1935
- Eupithecia edwardsi D. S. Fletcher, 1951
- Eupithecia fuscata D. S. Fletcher, 1951
- Eupithecia nigropolata D. S. Fletcher, 1951
- Eupithecia ochrata D. S. Fletcher, 1951
- Eupithecia rigida Swinhoe, 1892
- Eupithecia semipallida Janse, 1933
- Eupithecia tricuspis Prout, 1932
- Eupithecia undiculata Prout, 1932
- Geodena ansorgei (Warren, 1899)
- Geodena discinota (Warren, 1899)
- Geodena disticta (Bethune-Baker, 1909)
- Geodena funesta (Warren, 1899)
- Geodena monostigma Hampson, 1910
- Geodena venata Prout, 1915
- Heterorachis carpenteri Prout, 1915
- Horisme pallidimacula Prout, 1925
- Hydrelia argyridia (Butler, 1894)
- Hylemeridia nigricosta Prout, 1915
- Hypochrosis banakaria (Plötz, 1880)
- Hypochrosis glaucaria Hampson, 1909
- Hypochrosis maculifera Hampson, 1909
- Hypocoela subfulva Warren, 1897
- Hypocoela turpisaria (Swinhoe, 1904)
- Idaea amputata (Warren, 1899)
- Idaea prucholoma (Prout, 1932)
- Idaea subscutulata (Warren, 1899)
- Idiodes flexilinea (Warren, 1898)
- Isoplenodia kisubiensis Sihvonen & Staude, 2010
- Isturgia deerraria (Walker, 1861)
- Isturgia exospilata (Walker, 1861)
- Isturgia presbitaria (Swinhoe, 1904)
- Lathochlora perversa Prout, 1915
- Mauna diasporas Prout, 1932
- Medasina ugandaria (Swinhoe, 1904)
- Megadrepana cinerea Holland, 1893
- Melinoessa aemonia (Swinhoe, 1904)
- Melinoessa perlimbata (Guenée, 1857)
- Melinoessa sodaliata (Walker, 1862)
- Melinoessa subalbida Warren, 1905
- Melinoessa tanyglochis Prout, 1928
- Menophra aborta (Warren, 1898)
- Mimaletis reducta Prout, 1915
- Mimoclystia cancellata (Warren, 1899)
- Mimoclystia euthygramma (Prout, 1921)
- Mimoclystia thermochroa (Hampson, 1909)
- Narthecusa perplexata (Walker, 1862)
- Nothofidonia ansorgei (Warren, 1901)
- Oaracta maculata (Warren, 1897)
- Omphacodes divergens (Warren, 1899)
- Omphalucha brunnea (Warren, 1899)
- Pachypalpella subalbata (Warren, 1900)
- Piercia ansorgei (Bethune-Baker, 1913)
- Piercia chlorostola (Hampson, 1909)
- Piercia subrufaria (Warren, 1903)
- Pigiopsis convergens Warren, 1899
- Pingasa distensaria (Walker, 1860)
- Pitthea continua Walker, 1854
- Pitthea cyanomeris Prout, 1915
- Pitthea trifasciata Dewitz, 1881
- Prasinocyma centralis Prout, 1915
- Prasinocyma congrua (Walker, 1869)
- Prasinocyma immaculata (Thunberg, 1784)
- Prasinocyma nigrimacula Prout, 1915
- Prasinocyma nigripunctata (Warren, 1897)
- Prasinocyma oculata Prout, 1915
- Prasinocyma rubrimacula (Warren, 1899)
- Prasinocyma stictoloma Prout, 1928
- Problepsis aegretta Felder & Rogenhofer, 1875
- Problepsis digammata Kirby, 1896
- Protosteira spectabilis (Warren, 1899)
- Pseudolarentia megalaria (Guenée, 1858)
- Pseudolarentia monosticta (Butler, 1894)
- Pseudosoloe thalassina (Warren, 1909)
- Psilocerea pulverosa (Warren, 1894)
- Racotis angulosa Herbulot, 1973
- Rhodophthitus roseovittata (Butler, 1895)
- Rhodophthitus tricoloraria (Mabille, 1890)
- Scopula agrapta (Warren, 1902)
- Scopula albida (Warren, 1899)
- Scopula ansorgei (Warren, 1899)
- Scopula elegans (Prout, 1915)
- Scopula fuscobrunnea (Warren, 1901)
- Scopula improba (Warren, 1899)
- Scopula internataria (Walker, 1861)
- Scopula luxipuncta Prout, 1932
- Scopula ochreofusa (Warren, 1899)
- Scopula plionocentra Prout, 1920
- Scopula pulchellata (Fabricius, 1794)
- Scopula serena Prout, 1920
- Scopula silonaria (Guenée, 1858)
- Scopula subpectinata (Prout, 1915)
- Scopula suda Prout, 1932
- Scopula supina Prout, 1920
- Scopula tenera (Warren, 1899)
- Scopula tricommata (Warren, 1899)
- Somatina figurata Warren, 1897
- Somatina virginalis Prout, 1917
- Syndromodes invenusta (Wallengren, 1863)
- Terina chrysoptera Hampson, 1909
- Terina doleris (Plötz, 1880)
- Thalassodes albifimbria Warren, 1897
- Traminda acuta (Warren, 1897)
- Traminda drepanodes Prout, 1915
- Trimetopia aetheraria Guenée, 1858
- Victoria fuscithorax Warren, 1905
- Xanthisthisa tarsispina (Warren, 1901)
- Xanthorhoe alluaudi (Prout, 1932)
- Xanthorhoe ansorgei (Warren, 1899)
- Xanthorhoe conchata Warren, 1898
- Xanthorhoe exorista Prout, 1922
- Xanthorhoe heliopharia (Swinhoe, 1904)
- Xanthorhoe heteromorpha (Hampson, 1909)
- Xanthorhoe procne (Fawcett, 1916)
- Xanthorhoe tamsi D. S. Fletcher, 1963
- Xanthorhoe transcissa (Warren, 1902)
- Xanthorhoe transjugata Prout, 1923
- Xanthorhoe trientata (Warren, 1901)
- Xenimpia angusta Prout, 1915
- Xenostega fallax Warren, 1899
- Xenostega irrorata Prout, 1915
- Xylopteryx prasinaria Hampson, 1909
- Zamarada acalantis Herbulot, 2001
- Zamarada acosmeta Prout, 1921
- Zamarada adumbrata D. S. Fletcher, 1974
- Zamarada amicta Prout, 1915
- Zamarada amymone Prout, 1934
- Zamarada ariste D. S. Fletcher, 1974
- Zamarada astales D. S. Fletcher, 1974
- Zamarada bastelbergeri Gaede, 1915
- Zamarada bonaberiensis Strand, 1915
- Zamarada candelabra D. S. Fletcher, 1974
- Zamarada carcassoni D. S. Fletcher, 1974
- Zamarada chrysothyra Hampson, 1909
- Zamarada clenchi D. S. Fletcher, 1974
- Zamarada collarti Debauche, 1938
- Zamarada consummata D. S. Fletcher, 1974
- Zamarada crystallophana Mabille, 1900
- Zamarada cucharita D. S. Fletcher, 1974
- Zamarada cydippe Herbulot, 1954
- Zamarada deceptrix Warren, 1914
- Zamarada delta D. S. Fletcher, 1974
- Zamarada dentata D. S. Fletcher, 1958
- Zamarada dentigera Warren, 1909
- Zamarada differens Bastelberger, 1907
- Zamarada erosa D. S. Fletcher, 1974
- Zamarada euerces Prout, 1928
- Zamarada euphrosyne Oberthür, 1912
- Zamarada excavata Bethune-Baker, 1913
- Zamarada exigua D. S. Fletcher, 1974
- Zamarada flavicosta Warren, 1897
- Zamarada gamma D. S. Fletcher, 1958
- Zamarada ignicosta Prout, 1912
- Zamarada latimargo Warren, 1897
- Zamarada lepta D. S. Fletcher, 1974
- Zamarada longidens D. S. Fletcher, 1963
- Zamarada melanopyga Herbulot, 1954
- Zamarada melpomene Oberthür, 1912
- Zamarada metrioscaphes Prout, 1912
- Zamarada nasuta Warren, 1897
- Zamarada ostracodes D. S. Fletcher, 1974
- Zamarada paxilla D. S. Fletcher, 1974
- Zamarada pelobasis D. S. Fletcher, 1974
- Zamarada phaeozona Hampson, 1909
- Zamarada phoenopasta D. S. Fletcher, 1974
- Zamarada prolata D. S. Fletcher, 1974
- Zamarada radula D. S. Fletcher, 1974
- Zamarada reflexaria (Walker, 1863)
- Zamarada rufilinearia Swinhoe, 1904
- Zamarada setosa D. S. Fletcher, 1974
- Zamarada sicula D. S. Fletcher, 1974
- Zamarada terpsichore Oberthür, 1912
- Zamarada townsendi D. S. Fletcher, 1974
- Zamarada variola D. S. Fletcher, 1974
- Zamarada vigilans Prout, 1915
- Zamarada vulpina Warren, 1897

== Glyphipterigidae ==
- Irinympha aglaograpta Meyrick, 1932

== Gracillariidae ==
- Acrocercops bifasciata (Walsingham, 1891)
- Acrocercops chenopa Meyrick, 1932
- Acrocercops coloptila Meyrick, 1937
- Acrocercops orianassa Meyrick, 1932
- Aristaea bathracma (Meyrick, 1912)
- Caloptilia janeae Bradley, 1965
- Caloptilia octopunctata (Turner, 1894)
- Caloptilia pachyspila Bradley, 1965
- Conopomorpha fustigera (Meyrick, 1928)
- Corythoxestis aletreuta (Meyrick, 1936)
- Metriochroa celidota Bradley, 1965
- Phyllocnistis loxosticha Bradley, 1965
- Phyllonorycter fletcheri de Prins, 2012
- Phyllonorycter loxozona (Meyrick, 1936)
- Phyllonorycter ruwenzori de Prins, 2012
- Polysoma lithochrysa (Meyrick, 1930)

== Himantopteridae ==
- Doratopteryx zopheropa Bethune-Baker, 1911
- Pedoptila catori Bethune-Baker, 1911

== Lasiocampidae ==
- Anadiasa fuscofasciata (Aurivillius, 1922)
- Beralade continua Aurivillius, 1905
- Braura elgonensis (Kruck, 1940)
- Catalebeda tamsi Hering, 1932
- Cheligium choerocampoides (Holland, 1893)
- Epicnapteroides lobata Strand, 1912
- Eutricha morosa (Walker, 1865)
- Euwallengrenia reducta (Walker, 1855)
- Filiola lanceolata (Hering, 1932)
- Gastroplakaeis meridionalis Aurivillius, 1901
- Gelo joannoui Zolotuhin & Prozorov, 2010
- Gelo jordani (Tams, 1936)
- Gonometa nysa Druce, 1887
- Gonometa podocarpi Aurivillius, 1925
- Gonometa regia Aurivillius, 1905
- Grellada imitans (Aurivillius, 1893)
- Lechriolepis griseola Aurivillius, 1927
- Lechriolepis jacksoni (Bethune-Baker, 1911)
- Lechriolepis leucostigma (Hampson, 1909)
- Lechriolepis ochraceola Strand, 1912
- Lechriolepis tessmanni Strand, 1912
- Leipoxais batesi Bethune-Baker, 1927
- Leipoxais humfreyi Aurivillius, 1915
- Leipoxais marginepunctata Holland, 1893
- Leipoxais peraffinis Holland, 1893
- Leipoxais proboscidea (Guérin-Méneville, 1832)
- Leipoxais rufobrunnea Strand, 1912
- Leipoxais siccifolia Aurivillius, 1902
- Leipoxais tamsi D. S. Fletcher, 1968
- Mallocampa audea (Druce, 1887)
- Mallocampa leucophaea (Holland, 1893)
- Mimopacha bryki Aurivillius, 1927
- Mimopacha cinerascens (Holland, 1893)
- Mimopacha gerstaeckerii (Dewitz, 1881)
- Mimopacha tripunctata (Aurivillius, 1905)
- Morongea arnoldi (Aurivillius, 1909)
- Odontocheilopteryx corvus Gurkovich & Zolotuhin, 2009
- Odontocheilopteryx maculata Aurivillius, 1905
- Odontocheilopteryx myxa Wallengren, 1860
- Odontocheilopteryx pattersoni Tams, 1926
- Odontogama nigricans Aurivillius, 1914
- Opisthodontia sonithella Zolotuhin & Prozorov, 2010
- Opisthodontia supramalis Zolotuhin & Prozorov, 2010
- Opisthodontia varezhka Zolotuhin & Prozorov, 2010
- Opisthoheza heza Zolotuhin & Prozorov, 2010
- Pachymeta contraria (Walker, 1855)
- Pachymeta immunda (Holland, 1893)
- Pachymetana guttata (Aurivillius, 1914)
- Pachyna subfascia (Walker, 1855)
- Pachytrina gliharta Zolotuhin & Gurkovich, 2009
- Pachytrina honrathii (Dewitz, 1881)
- Pachytrina philargyria (Hering, 1928)
- Pachytrina trilineata (Aurivillius, 1911)
- Pallastica litlura Zolotuhin & Gurukovich, 2009
- Pallastica meloui (Riel, 1909)
- Philotherma jacchus Möschler, 1887
- Philotherma leucocyma (Hampson, 1909)
- Philotherma sordida Aurivillius, 1905
- Philotherma thoracica (Butler, 1895)
- Pseudolyra cervina (Aurivillius, 1905)
- Pseudolyra parva Tams, 1931
- Pseudometa andersoni Tams, 1925
- Pseudometa castanea Hampson, 1909
- Pseudometa choba (Druce, 1899)
- Pseudometa pagetodes Tams, 1929
- Sena strigifascia (Hampson, 1909)
- Sonitha lila Zolotuhin & Prozorov, 2010
- Sonitha myoctona Zolotuhin & Prozorov, 2010
- Stenophatna tamsi (Kiriakoff, 1963)
- Stoermeriana eccrita D. S. Fletcher, 1968
- Stoermeriana fusca (Aurivillius, 1905)
- Stoermeriana graberi (Dewitz, 1881)
- Stoermeriana ocellata Tams, 1929
- Stoermeriana sjostedti (Aurivillius, 1902)
- Stoermeriana tessmanni (Strand, 1912)
- Streblote butiti (Bethune-Baker, 1906)
- Streblote diplocyma (Hampson, 1909)
- Trabala charon Druce, 1910
- Trabala prasinophena Tams, 1931

== Limacodidae ==
- Coenobasis amoena Felder, 1874
- Halseyia latifascia (Hering, 1937)
- Halseyia rufilinea (Bethune-Baker, 1909)
- Halseyia tenuifascia (Hering, 1937)
- Halseyia ugandensis (Hering, 1937)
- Latoia viridicosta (Hampson, 1910)
- Macroplectra cinnamomea West, 1940
- Macroplectra fuscifusa Hampson, 1910
- Macroplectra jacksoni West, 1937
- Macroplectra mesocyma Hampson, 1910
- Macroplectra obliquilinea Hampson, 1910
- Macroplectra rufopallens Hampson, 1910
- Narosa hedychroa (Bethune-Baker, 1909)
- Parapluda incincta (Hampson, 1909)
- Parapluda invitabilis (Wallengren, 1860)
- Parasa hexamitobalia Tams, 1930
- Parasa parva Hering, 1938
- Tetraphleba ruficeps (Hampson, 1909)

== Lymantriidae ==
- Aroa interrogationis Collenette, 1938
- Bracharoa quadripunctata (Wallengren, 1875)
- Carpenterella chionobosca Collenette, 1960
- Collenettema crocipes (Boisduval, 1833)
- Conigephyra sericaria (Hering, 1926)
- Creagra atricosta (Hampson, 1909)
- Crorema evanescens (Hampson, 1910)
- Crorema fuscinotata (Hampson, 1910)
- Dasychira aeschra (Hampson, 1926)
- Dasychira glovera (Swinhoe, 1906)
- Dasychira nigroplagata (Bethune-Baker, 1913)
- Dasychira phoca Hampson, 1910
- Dyasma thaumatopoeides (Schultze, 1934)
- Eudasychira geoffreyi (Bethune-Baker, 1913)
- Eudasychira quinquepunctata Möschler, 1887
- Eudasychira umbrensis (Bethune-Baker, 1913)
- Euproctis aethiopica (Bethune-Baker, 1908)
- Euproctis aplegia Collenette, 1953
- Euproctis audeoudi Collenette, 1938
- Euproctis bigutta Holland, 1893
- Euproctis carcassoni Collenette, 1960
- Euproctis ceramozona Collenette, 1931
- Euproctis coniorta Collenette, 1960
- Euproctis conizona Collenette, 1933
- Euproctis croceisticta Hampson, 1909
- Euproctis disticta Bethune-Baker, 1909
- Euproctis melalepia Hampson, 1909
- Euproctis nessa Swinhoe, 1903
- Euproctis perpusilla Hering, 1926
- Euproctis pygmaea (Walker, 1855)
- Euproctis ugandicola Strand, 1911
- Homoeomeria hololeuca (Hampson, 1910)
- Jacksoniana striata (Collenette, 1937)
- Lacipa flavitincta Hampson, 1910
- Lacipa gemmata Distant, 1897
- Lacipa heterosticta Hampson, 1910
- Lacipa melanosticta Hampson, 1910
- Lacipa sundara (Swinhoe, 1903)
- Laelia acuta Bethune-Baker, 1913
- Laelia aethiopica Bethune-Baker, 1908
- Laelia bethuneana Strand, 1914
- Laelia diascia Hampson, 1905
- Laelia extorta (Distant, 1897)
- Laelia gigantea Hampson, 1910
- Laelia rivularis Hampson, 1910
- Leucoma costalis Swinhoe, 1906
- Leucoma discissa (Grünberg, 1910)
- Marblepsis kakamega Collenette, 1937
- Mylantria xanthospila (Plötz, 1880)
- Naroma nigrolunata Collenette, 1931
- Naroma signifera Walker, 1856
- Orgyia hopkinsi Collenette, 1937
- Orgyia nigrocristata Joicey & Talbot, 1924
- Otroeda hesperia (Cramer, 1779)
- Paraxena esquamata Bethune-Baker, 1911
- Pseudarctia nivea Bethune-Baker, 1911
- Pseudobazisa sericea (Hampson, 1910)
- Rahona ladburyi (Bethune-Baker, 1911)
- Rhypopteryx psoloconiama Collenette, 1960
- Sphragista basipuncta Joicey & Talbot, 1924
- Stilpnaroma melanocera (Hampson, 1909)
- Stracena kamengo Collenette, 1936
- Stracena promelaena (Holland, 1893)
- Stracena striata Schultze, 1934
- Tamsita habrotima (Tams, 1930)
- Tamsita ochthoeba (Hampson, 1920)

== Metarbelidae ==
- Haberlandia entebbeensis Lehmann, 2011
- Metarbela simillima (Hampson, 1910)
- Metarbelodes obliqualinea (Bethune-Baker, 1909)
- Mountelgonia arcifera (Hampson, 1909)
- Mountelgonia percivali Lehmann, 2013
- Paralebedella estherae Lehmann, 2008
- Salagena arcys D. S. Fletcher, 1968
- Shimonia splendida (D. S. Fletcher, 1968)

== Noctuidae ==
- Ableptina nephelopera (Hampson, 1909)
- Aburina phoenocrosmena Hampson, 1926
- Achaea albifimbria (Walker, 1869)
- Achaea boris (Geyer, 1837)
- Achaea catella Guenée, 1852
- Achaea catocaloides Guenée, 1852
- Achaea cupreitincta Hampson, 1918
- Achaea finita (Guenée, 1852)
- Achaea lienardi (Boisduval, 1833)
- Achaea phaeobasis Hampson, 1913
- Achaea sordida (Walker, 1865)
- Acontia buchanani (Rothschild, 1921)
- Acontia citrelinea Bethune-Baker, 1911
- Acontia hemixanthia (Hampson, 1910)
- Acontia holoxantha (Hampson, 1910)
- Acontia insocia (Walker, 1857)
- Acontia natalis (Guenée, 1852)
- Acontia niphogona (Hampson, 1909)
- Acontia secta Guenée, 1852
- Acontia veroxanthia Hacker, Legrain & Fibiger, 2010
- Acontia wahlbergi Wallengren, 1856
- Acrapex brunnea Hampson, 1910
- Acrapex spoliata (Walker, 1863)
- Aegocera obliqua Mabille, 1893
- Aegocera rectilinea Boisduval, 1836
- Aegocera tigrina (Druce, 1882)
- Aletia phaeopasta (Hampson, 1907)
- Aletia pyrausta (Hampson, 1913)
- Amazonides elaeopis (Hampson, 1907)
- Amblyprora acholi (Bethune-Baker, 1906)
- Amyna axis Guenée, 1852
- Amyna punctum (Fabricius, 1794)
- Anomis benitensis (Holland, 1894)
- Anomis erosa (Hübner, 1818)
- Anomis leucosema Hampson, 1926
- Anomis luperca Möschler, 1883
- Anomis sabulifera (Guenée, 1852)
- Apaegocera aurantipennis Hampson, 1912
- Arboricornus chrysopepla (Hampson, 1908)
- Ariathisa semiluna (Hampson, 1909)
- Asota speciosa (Drury, 1773)
- Aspidifrontia bussindii Berio, 1937
- Athetis nitens (Saalmüller, 1891)
- Athetis transversistriata Strand, 1911
- Audea paulumnodosa Kühne, 2005
- Autoba costimacula (Saalmüller, 1880)
- Axylia rhodopea (Hampson, 1907)
- Bareia incidens Walker, 1858
- Busseola obliquifascia (Hampson, 1909)
- Carpostalagma pulverulentus Talbot, 1929
- Carpostalagma viridis (Plötz, 1880)
- Catada phaeopasta Hampson, 1909
- Catephia iridocosma (Bethune-Baker, 1911)
- Charitosemia geraldi (Kirby, 1896)
- Chrysodeixis acuta (Walker, [1858])
- Chrysodeixis chalcites (Esper, 1789)
- Claterna gracillodina Hampson, 1926
- Corgatha ochrida Hampson, 1918
- Cortyta polycyma (Hampson, 1909)
- Crameria amabilis (Drury, 1773)
- Ctenoplusia fracta (Walker, 1857)
- Ctenoplusia limbirena (Guenée, 1852)
- Ctenoplusia phocea (Hampson, 1910)
- Cucullia perstriata Hampson, 1906
- Cyligramma amblyops Mabille, 1891
- Cyligramma fluctuosa (Drury, 1773)
- Cyligramma latona (Cramer, 1775)
- Cyligramma limacina (Guérin-Méneville, 1832)
- Cyligramma magus (Guérin-Méneville, [1844])
- Cyligramma simplex Grünberg, 1910
- Diascia nubilata (Hampson, 1909)
- Digama budonga Bethune-Baker, 1913
- Digama rileyi (Kiriakoff, 1958)
- Diparopsis castanea Hampson, 1902
- Dysgonia algira (Linnaeus, 1767)
- Dysgonia angularis (Boisduval, 1833)
- Dysgonia conjunctura (Walker, 1858)
- Dysgonia derogans (Walker, 1858)
- Dysgonia prorasigna (Hampson, 1913)
- Dysgonia torrida (Guenée, 1852)
- Ectolopha viridescens Hampson, 1902
- Egybolis vaillantina (Stoll, 1790)
- Elyptron ethiopica (Hampson, 1909)
- Erebus atavistis (Hampson, 1913)
- Erebus macrops (Linnaeus, 1767)
- Erebus walkeri (Butler, 1875)
- Ericeia inangulata (Guenée, 1852)
- Ericeia lituraria (Saalmüller, 1880)
- Ethiopica acrothecta D. S. Fletcher, 1961
- Ethiopica eclecta D. S. Fletcher, 1961
- Ethiopica glauchroa D. S. Fletcher, 1961
- Eublemma foedosa (Guenée, 1852)
- Eublemma misturata Hampson, 1910
- Eublemma ragusana (Freyer, 1844)
- Eudocima divitiosa (Walker, 1869)
- Eudocima fullonia (Clerck, 1764)
- Eudocima materna (Linnaeus, 1767)
- Eudrapa mollis Walker, 1857
- Eutelia discitriga Walker, 1865
- Euxootera leucoplaga (Hampson, 1907)
- Feliniopsis politzari Hacker & Fibiger, 2007
- Feliniopsis subsagula (D. S. Fletcher, 1961)
- Gesonia stictigramma Hampson, 1926
- Gracilodes nyctichroa Hampson, 1926
- Grammodes geometrica (Fabricius, 1775)
- Grammodes stolida (Fabricius, 1775)
- Helicoverpa zea (Boddie, 1850)
- Heliocheilus multiradiata (Hampson, 1902)
- Heraclia aemulatrix (Westwood, 1881)
- Heraclia aisha (Kirby, 1891)
- Heraclia atrifusa (Hampson, 1912)
- Heraclia gruenbergi (Wichgraf, 1911)
- Heraclia hornimani (Druce, 1880)
- Heraclia hypercompoides (Butler, 1895)
- Heraclia karschi (Holland, 1897)
- Heraclia longipennis (Walker, 1854)
- Heraclia monslunensis (Hampson, 1901)
- Heraclia poggei (Dewitz, 1879)
- Heraclia superba (Butler, 1875)
- Hypena obacerralis Walker, 1859
- Hypena recurvata Hampson, 1909
- Hypocala deflorata (Fabricius, 1794)
- Hypopyra capensis Herrich-Schäffer, 1854
- Leucania melanostrota (Hampson, 1905)
- Leucania melianoides Möschler, 1883
- Leucania sarca Hampson, 1902
- Leucania tacuna Felder & Rogenhofer, 1874
- Loxioda ochrota (Hampson, 1909)
- Manga melanodonta (Hampson, 1910)
- Marathyssa cuneata (Saalmüller, 1891)
- Marcipa aequatorialis Pelletier, 1975
- Marcipa pinheyi Pelletier, 1975
- Marcipalina hayesi (Pelletier, 1975)
- Masalia bimaculata (Moore, 1888)
- Masalia flavistrigata (Hampson, 1903)
- Masalia galatheae (Wallengren, 1856)
- Masalia latinigra (Hampson, 1907)
- Massaga maritona Butler, 1868
- Maxera brachypecten Hampson, 1926
- Maxera nigriceps (Walker, 1858)
- Mentaxya albifrons (Geyer, 1837)
- Mentaxya ignicollis (Walker, 1857)
- Metagarista maenas (Herrich-Schäffer, 1853)
- Metagarista triphaenoides Walker, 1854
- Metatacha excavata (Bethune-Baker, 1909)
- Miniodes discolor Guenée, 1852
- Miniodes maculifera Hampson, 1913
- Mitrophrys ansorgei (Rothschild, 1897)
- Mitrophrys menete (Cramer, 1775)
- Mocis frugalis (Fabricius, 1775)
- Mocis mayeri (Boisduval, 1833)
- Mocis mutuaria (Walker, 1858)
- Mocis repanda (Fabricius, 1794)
- Mocis undata (Fabricius, 1775)
- Nyodes brevicornis (Walker, 1857)
- Oligia ambigua (Walker, 1858)
- Oligia parathermes Bethune-Baker, 1911
- Omphalestra semifusca (Hampson, 1905)
- Omphaloceps triangularis (Mabille, 1893)
- Ophiusa cancellata (Saalmüller, 1891)
- Ophiusa conspicienda (Walker, 1858)
- Ophiusa violisparsa (L. B. Prout, 1919)
- Oraesia emarginata (Fabricius, 1794)
- Ozarba diaphora Berio, 1937
- Ozarba hypoxantha (Wallengren, 1860)
- Ozarba rosescens Hampson, 1910
- Ozarba semitorrida Hampson, 1916
- Ozarba subtilimba Berio, 1963
- Pandesma quenavadi Guenée, 1852
- Parachalciope agonia Hampson, 1913
- Parachalciope binaria (Holland, 1894)
- Parachalciope longiplaga Hampson, 1913
- Parachalciope monoplaneta Hampson, 1913
- Paralephana westi D. S. Fletcher, 1961
- Pericyma scandulata (Felder & Rogenhofer, 1874)
- Perigea ethiopica Hampson, 1908
- Phaegorista leucomelas (Herrich-Schäffer, 1855)
- Phaegorista similis Walker, 1869
- Phaegorista trialbata Prout, 1918
- Phaeoscia canipars Hampson, 1926
- Plecoptera dentilinea Hampson, 1926
- Plecoptera diplogramma Hampson, 1926
- Plecoptera melanoscia Hampson, 1926
- Plecopterodes melliflua (Holland, 1897)
- Pleuronodes anconia Hampson, 1926
- Pleuronodes lepticyma (Hampson, 1909)
- Plusia aranea Hampson, 1909
- Poeonoma serrata (Hampson, 1910)
- Polydesma umbricola Boisduval, 1833
- Prospalta sessei (Berio, 1937)
- Pseudcraspedia punctata Hampson, 1898
- Pseudoarcte melanis (Mabille, 1890)
- Pseudotuerta argyrochlora (Carcasson, 1964)
- Remigiodes remigina (Mabille, 1884)
- Rhanidophora agrippa Druce, 1899
- Rhanidophora flava Bethune-Baker, 1911
- Rhanidophora phedonia (Stoll, 1781)
- Rhanidophora piguerator Hampson, 1926
- Rothia rhaeo (Druce, 1894)
- Sarothroceras banaka (Plötz, 1880)
- Sciatta inconcisa Walker, 1869
- Sesamia albivena Hampson, 1902
- Sesamia sabulosa Hampson, 1910
- Soloe fumipennis Hampson, 1910
- Soloella orientis Kühne, 2007
- Sphingomorpha chlorea (Cramer, 1777)
- Spodoptera exempta (Walker, 1857)
- Spodoptera littoralis (Boisduval, 1833)
- Syngrapha circumflexa (Linnaeus, 1767)
- Thiacidas senex (Bethune-Baker, 1911)
- Thysanoplusia chalcedona (Hampson, 1902)
- Thysanoplusia cupreomicans (Hampson, 1909)
- Thysanoplusia rostrata (D. S. Fletcher, 1963)
- Thysanoplusia sestertia (Felder & Rogenhofer, 1874)
- Timora margarita Le Cerf, 1911
- Trachea atriplaga Hampson, 1911
- Tracheplexia amaranta (Felder & Rogenhofer, 1974)
- Tracheplexia schista D. S. Fletcher, 1961
- Trichoplusia orichalcea (Fabricius, 1775)
- Trigonodes hyppasia (Cramer, 1779)
- Ugia scopulina Hampson, 1926
- Uncula tristigmatias (Hampson, 1902)
- Vietteania pyrostrota (Hampson, 1907)
- Vittaplusia petraea Dufay, 1972
- Xanthomera leucoglene (Mabille, 1880)
- Xylostola olivata Hampson, 1909

== Nolidae ==
- Earias cupreoviridis (Walker, 1862)
- Eligma duplicata Aurivillius, 1892
- Maurilia arcuata (Walker, [1858])
- Meganola reubeni Agassiz, 2009
- Nola costimaculata Kiriakoff, 1958
- Nola melaleuca (Hampson, 1901)
- Nola ochrographa Hampson, 1907
- Plusiocalpe pallida Holland, 1894
- Trogobriga albifera Hampson, 1912
- Westermannia argyroplaga Hampson, 1905

== Notodontidae ==
- Amphiphalera leuconephra Hampson, 1910
- Amphiphalera nigripuncta Kiriakoff, 1975
- Antheua anomala Berio, 1937
- Antheua eriostepta Tams, 1932
- Antheua ochriventris (Strand, 1912)
- Antheua trifasciata (Hampson, 1909)
- Bugandita bisignata Kiriakoff, 1965
- Desmeocraera adusta Kiriakoff, 1962
- Desmeocraera analis Kiriakoff, 1954
- Desmeocraera dambae (Bethune-Baker, 1913)
- Desmeocraera esmeraldina Kiriakoff, 1958
- Desmeocraera geminata Gaede, 1928
- Desmeocraera gonerilla Kiriakoff, 1973
- Desmeocraera jucunda Kiriakoff, 1968
- Desmeocraera minima Kiriakoff, 1962
- Desmeocraera oliva Kiriakoff, 1968
- Diopeithes barnesi Kiriakoff, 1958
- Epanaphe moloneyi (Druce, 1887)
- Odontoperas dentigera Kiriakoff, 1962
- Oreocerura dissodectes (Kiriakoff, 1958)
- Pararheneades plumosa Kiriakoff, 1965
- Peratodonta gypsitea (Kiriakoff, 1968)
- Peratodonta nigriventris Kiriakoff, 1962
- Phalera atrata (Grünberg, 1907)
- Polienus capillata (Wallengren, 1875)
- Rasemia citaria (Schaus, 1893)
- Rasemia euzopherodes (Hampson, 1910)
- Rasemia macrodonta (Hampson, 1909)
- Rhenea monotonia Kiriakoff, 1965
- Rheneades flavescens Kiriakoff, 1962
- Scalmicauda corinna Kiriakoff, 1968
- Scalmicauda tricolor Kiriakoff, 1965
- Sidisca zika Kiriakoff, 1962
- Stenostaura impeditus (Walker, 1865)
- Xanthodonta diatrecta (Hampson, 1910)

== Oecophoridae ==
- Diocosma rhodopola Meyrick, 1930

== Psychidae ==
- Eumeta rougeoti Bourgogne, 1955
- Monda bicolor Strand, 1911
- Monda immunda Joicey & Talbot, 1924
- Monda junctimacula Hampson, 1910

== Pterophoridae ==
- Agdistis malitiosa Meyrick, 1909
- Agdistis obstinata Meyrick, 1920
- Apoxyptilus anthites (Meyrick, 1936)
- Cosmoclostis chalconota D. S. Fletcher, 1947
- Deuterocopus deltoptilus Meyrick, 1930
- Exelastis crudipennis (Meyrick, 1932)
- Fletcherella niphadarcha (Meyrick, 1930)
- Hellinsia ecstaticus (Meyrick, 1932)
- Megalorhipida leucodactylus (Fabricius, 1794)
- Picardia eparches (Meyrick, 1931)
- Platyptilia interpres Meyrick, 1922
- Platyptilia melitroctis Meyrick, 1924
- Platyptilia molopias Meyrick, 1906
- Platyptilia rhyncholoba Meyrick, 1924
- Platyptilia strictiformis Meyrick, 1932
- Pterophorus albidus (Zeller, 1852)

== Pyralidae ==
- Acracona elgonae Whalley, 1964
- Ematheudes neonepsia Martin, 1956
- Ematheudes straminella Snellen, 1872
- Endotricha ellisoni Whalley, 1963
- Hypsopygia mauritialis (Boisduval, 1833)
- Paraglossa atrisquamalis Hampson, 1906
- Tyndis proteanalis Hampson, 1906

== Saturniidae ==
- Aurivillius seydeli Rougeot, 1962
- Aurivillius xerophilus Rougeot, 1977
- Bunaea alcinoe (Stoll, 1780)
- Bunaeopsis hersilia (Westwood, 1849)
- Bunaeopsis jacksoni (Jordan, 1908)
- Bunaeopsis licharbas (Maassen & Weymer, 1885)
- Bunaeopsis oubie (Guérin-Méneville, 1849)
- Campimoptilum kuntzei (Dewitz, 1881)
- Decachorda pomona (Weymer, 1892)
- Epiphora antinorii (Oberthür, 1880)
- Epiphora intermedia (Rougeot, 1955)
- Epiphora lugardi Kirby, 1894
- Epiphora marginimacula Joicey & Talbot, 1924
- Epiphora rectifascia Rothschild, 1907
- Epiphora vacuna (Westwood, 1849)
- Gonimbrasia rectilineata (Sonthonnax, 1899)
- Goodia oxytela Jordan, 1922
- Goodia unguiculata Bouvier, 1936
- Gynanisa uganda Darge, 2008
- Holocerina smilax (Westwood, 1849)
- Imbrasia epimethea (Drury, 1772)
- Lobobunaea acetes (Westwood, 1849)
- Lobobunaea goodi (Holland, 1893)
- Lobobunaea phaedusa (Drury, 1782)
- Ludia hansali Felder, 1874
- Ludia orinoptena Karsch, 1892
- Micragone cana (Aurivillius, 1893)
- Micragone elisabethae Bouvier, 1930
- Nudaurelia alopia Westwood, 1849
- Nudaurelia anthinoides Rougeot, 1978
- Nudaurelia dione (Fabricius, 1793)
- Nudaurelia eblis Strecker, 1876
- Orthogonioptilum adiegetum Karsch, 1892
- Orthogonioptilum vestigiata (Holland, 1893)
- Pseudantheraea imperator Rougeot, 1962
- Pseudaphelia ansorgei Rothschild, 1898
- Pseudaphelia apollinaris (Boisduval, 1847)
- Pseudaphelia luteola Bouvier, 1930
- Pseudimbrasia deyrollei (J. Thomson, 1858)
- Pseudobunaea cleopatra (Aurivillius, 1893)
- Pseudobunaea tyrrhena (Westwood, 1849)
- Tagoropsis flavinata (Walker, 1865)
- Tagoropsis hanningtoni (Butler, 1883)
- Tagoropsis rougeoti D. S. Fletcher, 1952
- Urota centralis Bouyer, 2008
- Yatanga smithi (Holland, 1892)

== Sesiidae ==
- Aegeria ferox Meyrick, 1929
- Camaegeria aristura (Meyrick, 1931)
- Camaegeria sophax (Druce, 1899)
- Cryptomima hampsoni Butler, 1902
- Homogyna porphyractis Meyrick, 1937
- Hymenosphecia albomaculata Le Cerf, 1917
- Melittia acosmetes Hampson, 1919
- Melittia aureosquamata (Wallengren, 1863)
- Melittia auriplumia Hampson, 1910
- Melittia occidentalis Le Cerf, 1917
- Paranthrene xanthopyga Hampson, 1919
- Paranthrene xanthosoma (Hampson, 1910)
- Sura lampadura Meyrick, 1935
- Tipulamima flammipes (Hampson, 1910)
- Tipulamima pyrosoma Hampson, 1919

== Sphingidae ==
- Acanthosphinx guessfeldti (Dewitz, 1879)
- Agrius convolvuli (Linnaeus, 1758)
- Antinephele achlora Holland, 1893
- Antinephele anomala (Butler, 1882)
- Antinephele maculifera Holland, 1889
- Antinephele marcida Holland, 1893
- Basiothia aureata (Karsch, 1891)
- Centroctena rutherfordi (Druce, 1882)
- Cephonodes hylas (Linnaeus, 1771)
- Chaerocina dohertyi Rothschild & Jordan, 1903
- Chloroclanis virescens (Butler, 1882)
- Dovania poecila Rothschild & Jordan, 1903
- Falcatula cymatodes (Rothschild & Jordan, 1912)
- Falcatula falcata (Rothschild & Jordan, 1903)
- Hippotion aporodes Rothschild & Jordan, 1912
- Hippotion celerio (Linnaeus, 1758)
- Hippotion irregularis (Walker, 1856)
- Hippotion rebeli Rothschild & Jordan, 1903
- Hippotion roseipennis (Butler, 1882)
- Hypaedalea butleri Rothschild, 1894
- Hypaedalea lobipennis Strand, 1913
- Leucophlebia afra Karsch, 1891
- Leucophlebia neumanni Rothschild, 1902
- Lophostethus dumolinii (Angas, 1849)
- Lycosphingia hamatus (Dewitz, 1879)
- Macroglossum trochilus (Hübner, 1823)
- Neopolyptychus prionites (Rothschild & Jordan, 1916)
- Neopolyptychus serrator (Jordan, 1929)
- Nephele bipartita Butler, 1878
- Nephele discifera Karsch, 1891
- Nephele maculosa Rothschild & Jordan, 1903
- Nephele monostigma Clark, 1925
- Nephele rectangulata Rothschild, 1895
- Nephele rosae Butler, 1875
- Pantophaea jordani (Joicey & Talbot, 1916)
- Phylloxiphia formosa (Schultze, 1914)
- Phylloxiphia illustris (Rothschild & Jordan, 1906)
- Platysphinx constrigilis (Walker, 1869)
- Platysphinx stigmatica (Mabille, 1878)
- Poliana buchholzi (Plötz, 1880)
- Polyptychoides digitatus (Karsch, 1891)
- Polyptychus affinis Rothschild & Jordan, 1903
- Polyptychus andosa Walker, 1856
- Polyptychus carteri (Butler, 1882)
- Polyptychus hollandi Rothschild & Jordan, 1903
- Polyptychus nigriplaga Rothschild & Jordan, 1903
- Polyptychus orthographus Rothschild & Jordan, 1903
- Polyptychus paupercula (Holland, 1889)
- Polyptychus trisecta (Aurivillius, 1901)
- Praedora marshalli Rothschild & Jordan, 1903
- Pseudoclanis molitor (Rothschild & Jordan, 1912)
- Pseudoclanis occidentalis Rothschild & Jordan, 1903
- Pseudoclanis rhadamistus (Fabricius, 1781)
- Rufoclanis rosea (Druce, 1882)
- Temnora albilinea Rothschild, 1904
- Temnora atrofasciata Holland, 1889
- Temnora crenulata (Holland, 1893)
- Temnora curtula Rothschild & Jordan, 1908
- Temnora elegans (Rothschild, 1895)
- Temnora elisabethae Hering, 1930
- Temnora eranga (Holland, 1889)
- Temnora funebris (Holland, 1893)
- Temnora griseata Rothschild & Jordan, 1903
- Temnora hollandi Clark, 1920
- Temnora iapygoides (Holland, 1889)
- Temnora livida (Holland, 1889)
- Temnora plagiata Walker, 1856
- Temnora pseudopylas (Rothschild, 1894)
- Temnora pylades Rothschild & Jordan, 1903
- Temnora rattrayi Rothschild, 1904
- Temnora sardanus (Walker, 1856)
- Temnora scheveni Carcasson, 1968
- Temnora scitula (Holland, 1889)
- Temnora spiritus (Holland, 1893)
- Temnora zantus (Herrich-Schäffer, 1854)
- Theretra jugurtha (Boisduval, 1875)
- Theretra orpheus (Herrich-Schäffer, 1854)
- Theretra perkeo Rothschild & Jordan, 1903

== Thyrididae ==
- Arniocera cyanoxantha (Mabille, 1893)
- Arniocera poecila Jordan, 1907
- Cecidothyris affinia Whalley, 1971
- Chrysotypus circumfuscus Whalley, 1971
- Chrysotypus dawsoni Distant, 1897
- Chrysotypus vittiferalis (Gaede, 1917)
- Dysodia fenestratella Warren, 1900
- Dysodia intermedia (Walker, 1865)
- Dysodia magnifica Whalley, 1968
- Dysodia zelleri (Dewitz, 1881)
- Hypolamprus distrinctus Whalley, 1971
- Kalenga ansorgei (Warren, 1899)
- Kuja kibala Whalley, 1971
- Lamprochrysa scintillans (Butler, 1893)
- Lamprochrysa triplex (Plötz, 1880)
- Lelymena misalis Karsch, 1900
- Marmax semiaurata (Walker, 1854)
- Marmax smaragdina (Butler, 1888)
- Marmax vicaria (Walker, 1854)
- Nemea ankole Whalley, 1971
- Nemea nivosa Whalley, 1971
- Netrocera setioides Felder, 1874
- Rhodoneura serraticornis (Warren, 1899)
- Trichobaptes auristrigata (Plötz, 1880)
- Tridesmodes ramiculata Warren, 1899

== Tineidae ==
- Acridotarsa melipecta (Meyrick, 1915)
- Afrocelestis minuta (Gozmány, 1965)
- Ceratophaga vastellus (Zeller, 1852)
- Ceratophaga xanthastis (Meyrick, 1908)
- Cimitra estimata (Gozmány, 1965)
- Cimitra fetialis (Meyrick, 1917)
- Cimitra platyloxa (Meyrick, 1930)
- Cimitra spinignatha (Gozmány, 1968)
- Criticonoma esoterica (Gozmány, 1966)
- Crypsithyris miranda (Gozmány, 1966)
- Crypsithyris ruwenzorica (Gozmány, 1966)
- Cylicobathra chionarga Meyrick, 1920
- Dasyses incrustata (Meyrick, 1930)
- Dinica diana Gozmány, 1966
- Dinica hyacinthopa (Meyrick, 1932)
- Dinica orphnospila (Meyrick, 1934)
- Ectabola deviata (Gozmány, 1966)
- Edosa ensigera (Gozmány, 1966)
- Emblematodes aberrans Gozmány, 1966
- Hapsifera refalcata Gozmány, 1967
- Hapsifera revoluta Meyrick, 1914
- Hoplocentra mucronata Gozmány, 1968
- Hyperbola bradleyi Gozmány, 1966
- Leptozancla cultellata Gozmány & Vári, 1973
- Machaeropteris irritabilis Meyrick, 1932
- Monopis liparota Meyrick, 1920
- Monopis malescripta Meyrick, 1938
- Monopis megalodelta Meyrick, 1908
- Monopis persimilis Gozmány, 1965
- Monopis sciagrapha Bradley, 1965
- Morophaga capnochalca (Meyrick, 1932)
- Morophaga soror Gozmány, 1965
- Organodesma leucomicra (Gozmány, 1966)
- Organodesma ornata Gozmány, 1966
- Perissomastix breviberbis (Meyrick, 1933)
- Perissomastix ruwenzorica Gozmány & Vári, 1973
- Phalloscardia semiumbrata (Meyrick, 1920)
- Phereoeca barysticta (Meyrick, 1927)
- Phthoropoea oenochares (Meyrick, 1920)
- Phthoropoea pycnosaris (Meyrick, 1932)
- Pitharcha atrisecta (Meyrick, 1918)
- Pitharcha chalinaea Meyrick, 1908
- Scalmatica ascendens Gozmány, 1966
- Scalmatica zernyi Gozmány, 1967
- Silosca hypsocola Gozmány, 1968
- Silosca licziae Gozmány, 1967
- Silosca savannae Gozmány, 1968
- Sphallestasis epixena (Gozmány, 1966)
- Sphallestasis extraphalla (Gozmány, 1966)
- Sphallestasis fletcheri (Gozmány, 1966)
- Sphallestasis sinuosa (Gozmány, 1966)
- Tinea allomella Bradley, 1965
- Tinea amphitrite Meyrick, 1932
- Tinemelitta ceriaula (Meyrick, 1914)
- Tineola bisselliella (Hummel, 1823)
- Tinissa poliophasma Bradley, 1965
- Tinissa ruwenzorica Gozmány, 1966
- Tiquadra lichenea Walsingham, 1897
- Wegneria astragalodes (Meyrick, 1922)
- Wegneria chrysophthalma (Meyrick, 1934)
- Xerantica tephroclysta Meyrick, 1930

== Tortricidae ==
- Acleris chloroma Razowski, 1993
- Acleris ruwenzorica Razowski, 2005
- Acleris thylacitis (Meyrick, 1920)
- Actihema fibigeri Aarvik, 2010
- Actihema jirani Aarvik, 2010
- Apolobesia sitophaga (Meyrick, 1922)
- Astronauta stellans (Meyrick, 1922)
- Bactra philocherda Diakonoff, 1964
- Bactra tylophora Diakonoff, 1963
- Brachioxena sparactis (Meyrick, 1928)
- Capua arctophaea Meyrick, 1924
- Capua pusillana (Walker, 1863)
- Capua spilonoma Meyrick, 1932
- Clepsis stenophora (Bradley, 1965)
- Cornips dryocausta (Meyrick, 1938)
- Cosmorrhyncha microcosma Aarvik, 2004
- Crimnologa fletcheri Bradley, 1965
- Crocidosema plebejana Zeller, 1847
- Cryptaspasma caryothicta (Meyrick, 1920)
- Cryptophlebia semilunana (Saalmüller, 1880)
- Cydia stelosema (Meyrick, 1931)
- Diceratura complicana Aarvik, 2010
- Dichrorampha excisa Walsingham, 1891
- Dinogenes meteoropa Meyrick, 1934
- Eccopsis nebulana Walsingham, 1891
- Eccopsis wahlbergiana Zeller, 1852
- Endothenia alpigena Bradley, 1965
- Endothenia nephelopsycha (Meyrick, 1934)
- Epichoristodes atycta Bradley, 1965
- Epichoristodes heterotropha Bradley, 1965
- Epichoristodes panochra Bradley, 1965
- Episimus cyanitis Meyrick, 1932
- Eucosma cremastropis Meyrick, 1930
- Eucosma orthopeda Meyrick, 1934
- Eucosma plumbaginea Meyrick, 1931
- Eugnosta marginana Aarvik, 2010
- Eupoecilia kruegeriana Razowski, 1993
- Hypsidracon saurodoxa Meyrick, 1934
- Lozotaenia edwardsi (Bradley, 1965)
- Megalota archana Aarvik, 2004
- Metamesia elegans (Walsingham, 1881)
- Metamesia endopyrrha (Meyrick, 1930)
- Metamesia octogona Bradley, 1965
- Metamesia physetopa (Meyrick, 1932)
- Niphothixa ophina Bradley, 1965
- Notocelia scotodes Bradley, 1965
- Olethreutes phyllodoxa (Meyrick, 1932)
- Olethreutes pontifraga (Meyrick, 1928)
- Olethreutes rhodochranta (Meyrick, 1933)
- Olethreutes vinculigera (Meyrick, 1939)
- Pandemis cerioschema (Meyrick, 1934)
- Pandemis eustropha (Bradley, 1965)
- Pandemis orophila (Bradley, 1965)
- Paramesiodes aprepta Bradley, 1965
- Phalarocarpa harmographa Meyrick, 1937
- Procrica ophiograpta (Meyrick, 1932)
- Sycacantha nereidopa (Meyrick, 1927)
- Sycacantha penthrana (Bradley, 1965)
- Thaumatotibia leucotreta (Meyrick, 1913)
- Tortrix chalicodes Meyrick, 1920
- Tortrix dinota Meyrick, 1918
- Trachybyrsis euglypta Meyrick, 1927
- Trachybyrsis hypsitropha Bradley, 1965

== Uraniidae ==
- Aploschema albaria (Plötz, 1880)
- Dissoprumna erycinaria (Guenée, 1857)
- Epiplema barbara Warren, 1899

== Zygaenidae ==
- Astyloneura difformis (Jordan, 1907)
- Astyloneura esmeralda (Hampson, 1920)
- Astyloneura nitens Jordan, 1907
- Chalconycles vetulina Jordan, 1907
- Epiorna abessynica (Koch, 1865)
- Saliunca aenescens Hampson, 1920
- Saliunca chalconota Hampson, 1920
- Saliunca cyanea Hampson, 1920
- Saliunca cyanothorax Hampson, 1920
- Saliunca egeria Bethune-Baker, 1913
- Saliunca flavifrons (Plötz, 1880)
- Saliunca homochroa (Holland, 1897)
- Saliunca sapphirina Hampson, 1920
- Saliunca styx (Fabricius, 1775)
- Saliunca ugandana Jordan, 1908
- Saliunca ventralis Jordan, 1907
- Syringura triplex (Plötz, 1880)
