= Niphothixa =

Scientific classification
- Domain: Eukaryota
- Kingdom: Animalia
- Phylum: Arthropoda
- Class: Insecta
- Order: Lepidoptera
- Family: Tortricidae
- Subfamily: Tortricinae
- Tribe: Archipini
- Genus: Niphothixa; Diakonoff, 1960

Genus of tortrix moths

Niphothixa is a genus of moths belonging to the subfamily Tortricinae of the family Tortricidae.

== Species ==
- Niphothixa amphibola Diakonoff, 1960
- Niphothixa atava Diakonoff, 1970
- Niphothixa niphadacra Diakonoff, 1960
- Niphothixa ophina Bradley, 1965

== Former species ==
- Niphothixa dryocausta (Meyrick, 1938)

== See also ==
- List of Tortricidae genera
