= Sura (moth) =

Scientific classification
- Kingdom: Animalia
- Phylum: Arthropoda
- Class: Insecta
- Order: Lepidoptera
- Family: Sesiidae
- Tribe: Paranthrenini
- Genus: Sura; Walker, 1856

Species
- See text

Genus of moths

Sura is a genus of moths in the family Sesiidae.

== Species ==
- Sura ellenbergeri (Le Cerf, 1917)
- Sura lampadura Meyrick, 1935
- Sura melanochalcia (Le Cerf, 1917)
- Sura pyrocera Hampson, 1919
- Sura ruficauda (Rothschild, 1911)
- Sura rufitibia Hampson, 1919
- Sura xanthopyga (Hampson, 1919)
- Sura xylocopiformis Walker, 1856
- Sura chalybea Butler, 1876
- Sura cyanea Hampson, 1919
- Sura ignicauda (Hampson, [1893])
- Sura phoenicia Hampson, 1919
- Sura pryeri Druce, 1882
- Sura uncariae Schneider, 1940
