= Rothia agrius =

Scientific classification
- Domain: Eukaryota
- Kingdom: Animalia
- Phylum: Arthropoda
- Class: Insecta
- Order: Lepidoptera
- Superfamily: Noctuoidea
- Family: Noctuidae
- Genus: Rothia
- Species: R. agrius

Binomial name
- Rothia agrius (Herrich-Schäffer, 1853)

Synonyms
- Agarista agrius Herrich-Schäffer, 1853; Rothia simplex Rothschild, 1896

Species of moth

Rothia agrius is a moth of the family Noctuidae. This moth occurs in Madagascar.
