= Cornips gravidspinatus =

Scientific classification
- Kingdom: Animalia
- Phylum: Arthropoda
- Clade: Pancrustacea
- Class: Insecta
- Order: Lepidoptera
- Family: Tortricidae
- Genus: Cornips
- Species: C. gravidspinatus

Binomial name
- Cornips gravidspinatus Razowski, 2010

Species of moth

Cornips gravidspinatus is a species of moth of the family Tortricidae. It is found in the Democratic Republic of Congo.

The wingspan is about 18.2 mm.
