= Hypsidracon =

Scientific classification
- Kingdom: Animalia
- Phylum: Arthropoda
- Class: Insecta
- Order: Lepidoptera
- Family: Tortricidae
- Subfamily: Olethreutinae
- Genus: Hypsidracon; Meyrick, 1934

Genus of tortrix moths

Hypsidracon is a genus of moths belonging to the subfamily Olethreutinae of the family Tortricidae.

== Species ==
- Hypsidracon kururana Razowski, 2012
- Hypsidracon saurodoxa Meyrick, 1934

== See also ==
- List of Tortricidae genera
