= Tamsita =

Scientific classification
- Domain: Eukaryota
- Kingdom: Animalia
- Phylum: Arthropoda
- Class: Insecta
- Order: Lepidoptera
- Superfamily: Noctuoidea
- Family: Erebidae
- Tribe: Incertae sedis
- Genus: Tamsita; Kiriakoff, 1954

Genus of moths

Tamsita is a genus of tussock moths in the family Erebidae.

== Species ==
- Tamsita habrotima Tams, 1930
- Tamsita ochthoeba Hampson, 1920
