= Sura pyrocera =

Scientific classification
- Kingdom: Animalia
- Phylum: Arthropoda
- Class: Insecta
- Order: Lepidoptera
- Family: Sesiidae
- Genus: Sura
- Species: S. pyrocera

Binomial name
- Sura pyrocera Hampson, 1919

Species of moth

Sura pyrocera is a moth of the family Sesiidae. It is known from Malawi and Mozambique.
