= Cornips =

Scientific classification
- Kingdom: Animalia
- Phylum: Arthropoda
- Clade: Pancrustacea
- Class: Insecta
- Order: Lepidoptera
- Family: Tortricidae
- Tribe: Archipini
- Genus: Cornips; Razowski, 2010

Genus of moths

Cornips is a genus of moths belonging to the family Tortricidae.

== Species ==
- Cornips agelasta (Bradley, 1965)
- Cornips dryocausta (Meyrick, 1938)
- Cornips gravidspinatus Razowski, 2010

== See also ==
- List of Tortricidae genera
