= Ptilothyris crossoceros =

Scientific classification
- Kingdom: Animalia
- Phylum: Arthropoda
- Class: Insecta
- Order: Lepidoptera
- Family: Lecithoceridae
- Genus: Ptilothyris
- Species: P. crossoceros

Binomial name
- Ptilothyris crossoceros Meyrick, 1934

Species of moth

Ptilothyris crossoceros is a moth in the family Lecithoceridae. It was described by Edward Meyrick in 1934. It is found in the Democratic Republic of the Congo (North Kivu) and Tanzania.
