= Ptilothyris purpurea =

Scientific classification
- Domain: Eukaryota
- Kingdom: Animalia
- Phylum: Arthropoda
- Class: Insecta
- Order: Lepidoptera
- Family: Lecithoceridae
- Genus: Ptilothyris
- Species: P. purpurea

Binomial name
- Ptilothyris purpurea Walsingham, 1897

Species of moth

Ptilothyris purpurea is a moth in the family Lecithoceridae. It was described by Walsingham in 1897. It is found in the Central African Republic, the Democratic Republic of Congo (Bas Congo), Equatorial Guinea and Nigeria.

The wingspan is about 24 mm. The forewings are shining, dark purplish, with a triangular patch of somewhat roughened scales extending nearly across the wing at one-third from the base (this is bright purplish grey in certain lights, but appears brownish fuscous if held in an opposite direction). Beyond this, at the upper angle of the cell is a smaller similar patch and a slender subochreous line runs along the base of the dark purplish cilia. The hindwings of the males are deep purplish fuscous (varying somewhat according to the angle at which the light strikes them) with the costal margin from the base to two-thirds shining whitish ochreous. A pale, iridescent transparent elongate patch, lying beneath the costal margin beyond the middle, extends nearly across the width of the cell and a tuft of greyish hair-scales is found at the base of vein 1. The hindwings of the females are cupreous brown, without the pale patch.
