= Ptilothyris brachysema =

Scientific classification
- Kingdom: Animalia
- Phylum: Arthropoda
- Class: Insecta
- Order: Lepidoptera
- Family: Lecithoceridae
- Genus: Ptilothyris
- Species: P. brachysema

Binomial name
- Ptilothyris brachysema Meyrick, 1938

Species of moth

Ptilothyris brachysema is a moth in the family Lecithoceridae. It was described by Edward Meyrick in 1938. It is found in the Democratic Republic of the Congo (Orientale).
