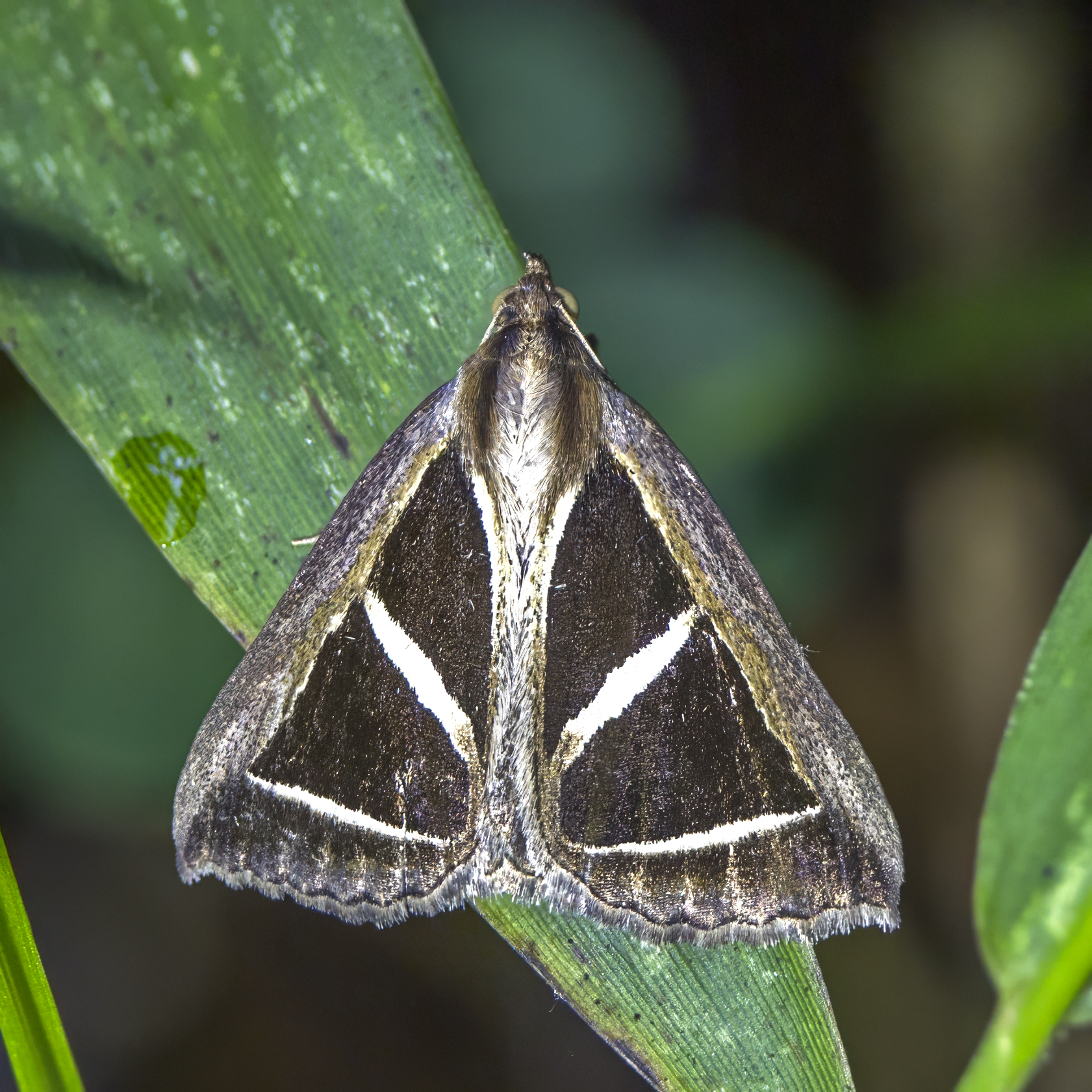
- P. benitenis, Ghana

Scientific classification
- Kingdom: Animalia
- Phylum: Arthropoda
- Class: Insecta
- Order: Lepidoptera
- Superfamily: Noctuoidea
- Family: Erebidae
- Subfamily: Erebinae
- Genus: Parachalciope; Hampson, 1913

= Parachalciope =

Genus of moths

Parachalciope is a genus of moths of the family Erebidae. The genus was erected by George Hampson in 1913.

== Species ==
- Parachalciope agonia Hampson, 1913
- Parachalciope albifissa (Hampson, 1910)
- Parachalciope benitensis (Holland, 1894)
- Parachalciope binaria (Holland, 1894)
- Parachalciope deltifera (Felder & Rogenhofer, 1874)
- Parachalciope emiplaneta Berio, 1954
- Parachalciope euclidicola (Walker, 1858) (syn: Parachalciope furcifera (Hampson, 1902))
- Parachalciope inornata (Holland, 1894)
- Parachalciope longiplaga Hampson, 1913
- Parachalciope mahura (Felder & Rogenhofer, 1874) (syn: Parachalciope ditrigona (Hampson, 1910))
- Parachalciope mixta Rothschild, 1921
- Parachalciope monoplaneta Hampson, 1913
- Parachalciope rotundata Gaede, 1936
- Parachalciope trigonometrica Hampson, 1913
