= Ptilothyris neuroplaca =

Scientific classification
- Domain: Eukaryota
- Kingdom: Animalia
- Phylum: Arthropoda
- Class: Insecta
- Order: Lepidoptera
- Family: Lecithoceridae
- Genus: Ptilothyris
- Species: P. neuroplaca

Binomial name
- Ptilothyris neuroplaca (Meyrick, 1933)

Synonyms
- Idiopteryx neuroplaca Meyrick, 1933

Species of moth

Ptilothyris neuroplaca is a moth in the family Lecithoceridae. It was described by Edward Meyrick in 1933. It is found in Zambia.
