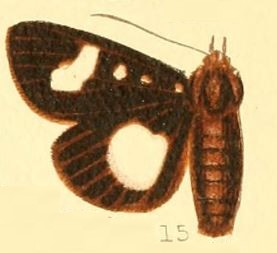

Scientific classification
- Domain: Eukaryota
- Kingdom: Animalia
- Phylum: Arthropoda
- Class: Insecta
- Order: Lepidoptera
- Superfamily: Noctuoidea
- Family: Noctuidae
- Genus: Rothia
- Species: R. lasti

Binomial name
- Rothia lasti Rothschild, 1896

Synonyms
- Rothia epiera Jordan, 1913

= Rothia lasti =

Species of moth

Rothia lasti is a moth of the family Noctuidae. This moth is endemic to western Madagascar.

This species has a wingspan of 19 mm. It has black forewings with one white dot at the base and two in the cell, they are crossed by an oblique band of creamy white with a width of 4−5 mm. Hindwings are black with a discal patch. The white markings vary a lot in the individual specimen. Palpi, head and thorax are black with white spots. Underside of thorax and legs are orange.
