= Sura melanochalcia =

Scientific classification
- Domain: Eukaryota
- Kingdom: Animalia
- Phylum: Arthropoda
- Class: Insecta
- Order: Lepidoptera
- Family: Sesiidae
- Genus: Sura
- Species: S. melanochalcia

Binomial name
- Sura melanochalcia (Le Cerf, 1917)

Synonyms
- Episannina melanochalcia Le Cerf, 1917

Species of moth

Sura melanochalcia is a moth of the family Sesiidae. It is known from South Africa.
