= Hippurarctia cinereoguttata =

Scientific classification
- Domain: Eukaryota
- Kingdom: Animalia
- Phylum: Arthropoda
- Class: Insecta
- Order: Lepidoptera
- Superfamily: Noctuoidea
- Family: Erebidae
- Subfamily: Arctiinae
- Genus: Hippurarctia
- Species: H. cinereoguttata

Binomial name
- Hippurarctia cinereoguttata (Strand, 1912)

Synonyms
- Metarctia cinereoguttata Strand, 1912; Metarctia cameruna Hampson, 1914

Species of moth

Hippurarctia cinereoguttata is a moth of the family Erebidae. It was described by Strand in 1912. It is found in Cameroon, Equatorial Guinea and Nigeria.
