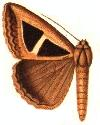

Scientific classification
- Kingdom: Animalia
- Phylum: Arthropoda
- Class: Insecta
- Order: Lepidoptera
- Superfamily: Noctuoidea
- Family: Erebidae
- Genus: Parachalciope
- Species: P. trigonometrica

Binomial name
- Parachalciope trigonometrica Hampson, 1913

= Parachalciope trigonometrica =

Species of moth

Parachalciope trigonometrica is a moth of the family Noctuidae first described by George Hampson in 1913. It is found in the Gambia and Kenya.
