= Monstruncusarctia =

Scientific classification
- Kingdom: Animalia
- Phylum: Arthropoda
- Clade: Pancrustacea
- Class: Insecta
- Order: Lepidoptera
- Superfamily: Noctuoidea
- Family: Erebidae
- Subfamily: Arctiinae
- Subtribe: Spilosomina
- Genus: Monstruncusarctia; Dubatolov & Haynes, 2008

Type species
- Alpenus aurantiaca Holland, 1893

Genus of moths

Monstruncusarctia is a genus of moths in the family Erebidae from the Afrotropics.

== Species ==
- Monstruncusarctia aurantiaca (Holland, 1893)
- Monstruncusarctia decemmaculata (Rothschild, 1916)
