= Monstruncusarctia aurantiaca =

Scientific classification
- Domain: Eukaryota
- Kingdom: Animalia
- Phylum: Arthropoda
- Class: Insecta
- Order: Lepidoptera
- Superfamily: Noctuoidea
- Family: Erebidae
- Subfamily: Arctiinae
- Genus: Monstruncusarctia
- Species: M. aurantiaca

Binomial name
- Monstruncusarctia aurantiaca (Holland, 1893)

Synonyms
- Alpenus aurantiaca Holland, 1893; Spilosoma aurantiaca; Alpenus multiscripta Holland, 1893

Species of moth

Monstruncusarctia aurantiaca is a moth of the family Erebidae. It was described by William Jacob Holland in 1893. It is found in Cameroon, the Democratic Republic of the Congo, Equatorial Guinea, Gabon, Ghana, Liberia, Niger, Nigeria, Sierra Leone and Uganda.

The larvae feed on Sapuim, Solanum, Datura and Theobroma cacao.
