= Palaeosiccia punctata =

Scientific classification
- Kingdom: Animalia
- Phylum: Arthropoda
- Clade: Pancrustacea
- Class: Insecta
- Order: Lepidoptera
- Superfamily: Noctuoidea
- Family: Erebidae
- Subfamily: Arctiinae
- Genus: Palaeosiccia
- Species: P. punctata

Binomial name
- Palaeosiccia punctata Hampson, 1900

Species of moth

Palaeosiccia punctata is a moth of the subfamily Arctiinae. It is found in the Democratic Republic of Congo, Kenya and Sierra Leone.
