= Rothia cruenta =

Scientific classification
- Kingdom: Animalia
- Phylum: Arthropoda
- Class: Insecta
- Order: Lepidoptera
- Superfamily: Noctuoidea
- Family: Noctuidae
- Genus: Rothia
- Species: R. cruenta

Binomial name
- Rothia cruenta Jordan, 1913

Synonyms
- Agarista

Species of moth

Rothia cruenta is a moth of the family Noctuidae. This moth occurs in Madagascar.
