= Tesma =

Scientific classification
- Domain: Eukaryota
- Kingdom: Animalia
- Phylum: Arthropoda
- Class: Insecta
- Order: Lepidoptera
- Superfamily: Noctuoidea
- Family: Erebidae
- Subfamily: Arctiinae
- Tribe: Lithosiini
- Genus: Tesma; Birket-Smith, 1965

Genus of moths

Tesma is a genus of moths in the subfamily Arctiinae.

== Species ==
- Tesma nigrapex Strand, 1912
- Tesma tessmanniana Strand, 1912
- Tesma fractifascia Hampson, 1918
- Tesma melema Kiriakoff, 1958
