= Hippurarctia taymansi =

Scientific classification
- Domain: Eukaryota
- Kingdom: Animalia
- Phylum: Arthropoda
- Class: Insecta
- Order: Lepidoptera
- Superfamily: Noctuoidea
- Family: Erebidae
- Subfamily: Arctiinae
- Genus: Hippurarctia
- Species: H. taymansi

Binomial name
- Hippurarctia taymansi (Rothschild, 1910)

Synonyms
- Metarctia taymansi Rothschild, 1910; Hippurarctia taymansi septentrionalis Kiriakoff, 1957; Metarctia taymansi f. kamitugensis Dufrane, 1945; Metarctia taymansi ab. obscura Dufrane, 1945

Species of moth

Hippurarctia taymansi is a moth of the family Erebidae. It was described by Rothschild in 1910. It is found in the Democratic Republic of Congo, the Republic of Congo and Cameroon.
