= Sura ellenbergeri =

Scientific classification
- Kingdom: Animalia
- Phylum: Arthropoda
- Class: Insecta
- Order: Lepidoptera
- Family: Sesiidae
- Genus: Sura
- Species: S. ellenbergeri

Binomial name
- Sura ellenbergeri (Le Cerf, 1917)

Synonyms
- Episannina ellenbergeri Le Cerf, 1917; Sura ellenbergi Hampson, 1919

Species of moth

Sura ellenbergeri is a moth of the family Sesiidae. It is known from Gabon.
