= Ptilothyris nausicaa =

Scientific classification
- Kingdom: Animalia
- Phylum: Arthropoda
- Class: Insecta
- Order: Lepidoptera
- Family: Lecithoceridae
- Genus: Ptilothyris
- Species: P. nausicaa

Binomial name
- Ptilothyris nausicaa Meyrick, 1926

Species of moth

Ptilothyris nausicaa is a moth in the family Lecithoceridae. It was described by Edward Meyrick in 1926. It is found in the Democratic Republic of the Congo.

The wingspan is about 21 mm. The forewings are deep purple with a rounded-triangular light ochreous-yellow median blotch reaching from above the middle to near the dorsum. The hindwings are dark purple fuscous.
