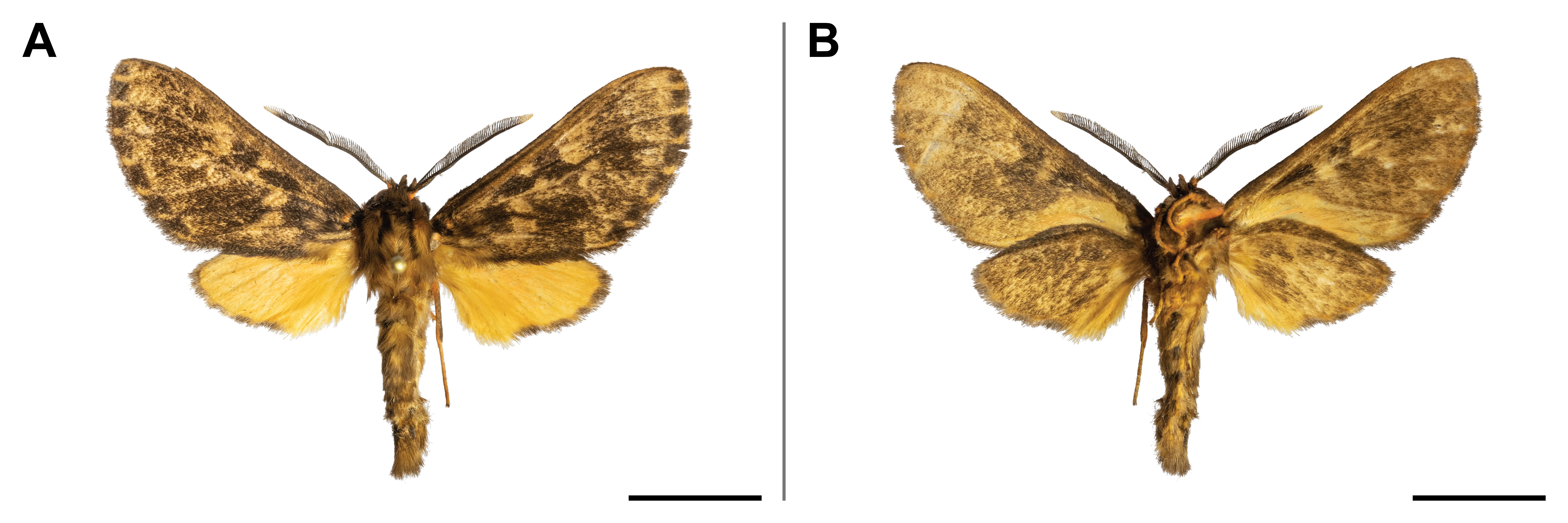

Scientific classification
- Domain: Eukaryota
- Kingdom: Animalia
- Phylum: Arthropoda
- Class: Insecta
- Order: Lepidoptera
- Superfamily: Noctuoidea
- Family: Erebidae
- Subfamily: Arctiinae
- Genus: Hippurarctia
- Species: H. judith

Binomial name
- Hippurarctia judith Kiriakoff, 1959

= Hippurarctia judith =

Species of moth

Hippurarctia judith is a moth of the family Erebidae. It was described by Sergius G. Kiriakoff in 1959. It is found in the Democratic Republic of the Congo and Ghana.
