= Sura xylocopiformis =

Scientific classification
- Kingdom: Animalia
- Phylum: Arthropoda
- Class: Insecta
- Order: Lepidoptera
- Family: Sesiidae
- Genus: Sura
- Species: S. xylocopiformis

Binomial name
- Sura xylocopiformis Walker, 1856

Synonyms
- Sura bicolor Le Cerf, 1917

Species of moth

Sura xylocopiformis is a moth of the family Sesiidae. It is known from South Africa.
