= Hippurarctia =

Scientific classification
- Domain: Eukaryota
- Kingdom: Animalia
- Phylum: Arthropoda
- Class: Insecta
- Order: Lepidoptera
- Superfamily: Noctuoidea
- Family: Erebidae
- Subfamily: Arctiinae
- Tribe: Syntomini
- Genus: Hippurarctia; Kiriakoff, 1953

Genus of moths

Hippurarctia is a genus of moths in the family Erebidae. The genus was described by Sergius G. Kiriakoff in 1953.

== Species ==
- Hippurarctia cinereoguttata (Strand, 1912)
- Hippurarctia ferrigera (Druce, 1910)
- Hippurarctia judith Kiriakoff, 1959
- Hippurarctia taymansi (Rothschild, 1910)
