= Carpostalagma =

Scientific classification
- Domain: Eukaryota
- Kingdom: Animalia
- Phylum: Arthropoda
- Class: Insecta
- Order: Lepidoptera
- Superfamily: Noctuoidea
- Family: Erebidae
- Subfamily: Arctiinae
- Tribe: Arctiini
- Genus: Carpostalagma; Karsch, 1894

Genus of moths

Carpostalagma is a genus of moths in the subfamily Arctiinae. The genus was described by Ferdinand Karsch in 1894.

== Species ==
- Carpostalagma chalybeata Talbot, 1929
- Carpostalagma pulverulentus Talbot, 1929
- Carpostalagma signata Talbot, 1932
- Carpostalagma viridis Plötz, 1880
