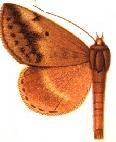

Scientific classification
- Kingdom: Animalia
- Phylum: Arthropoda
- Class: Insecta
- Order: Lepidoptera
- Superfamily: Noctuoidea
- Family: Erebidae
- Genus: Parachalciope
- Species: P. inornata

Binomial name
- Parachalciope inornata (Holland, 1894)

Synonyms
- Trigonodes inornata Holland, 1894; Remigia inornata (Holland, 1894)

= Parachalciope inornata =

Species of moth

Parachalciope inornata is a moth of the family Noctuidae first described by William Jacob Holland in 1894. It is found in the Democratic Republic of the Congo, Ghana and Gabon.
