= Carpostalagma signata =

Scientific classification
- Kingdom: Animalia
- Phylum: Arthropoda
- Class: Insecta
- Order: Lepidoptera
- Superfamily: Noctuoidea
- Family: Erebidae
- Subfamily: Arctiinae
- Genus: Carpostalagma
- Species: C. signata

Binomial name
- Carpostalagma signata Talbot, 1932

Species of moth

Carpostalagma signata is a moth of the subfamily Arctiinae. It was described by George Talbot in 1932. It is found in Zambia.
