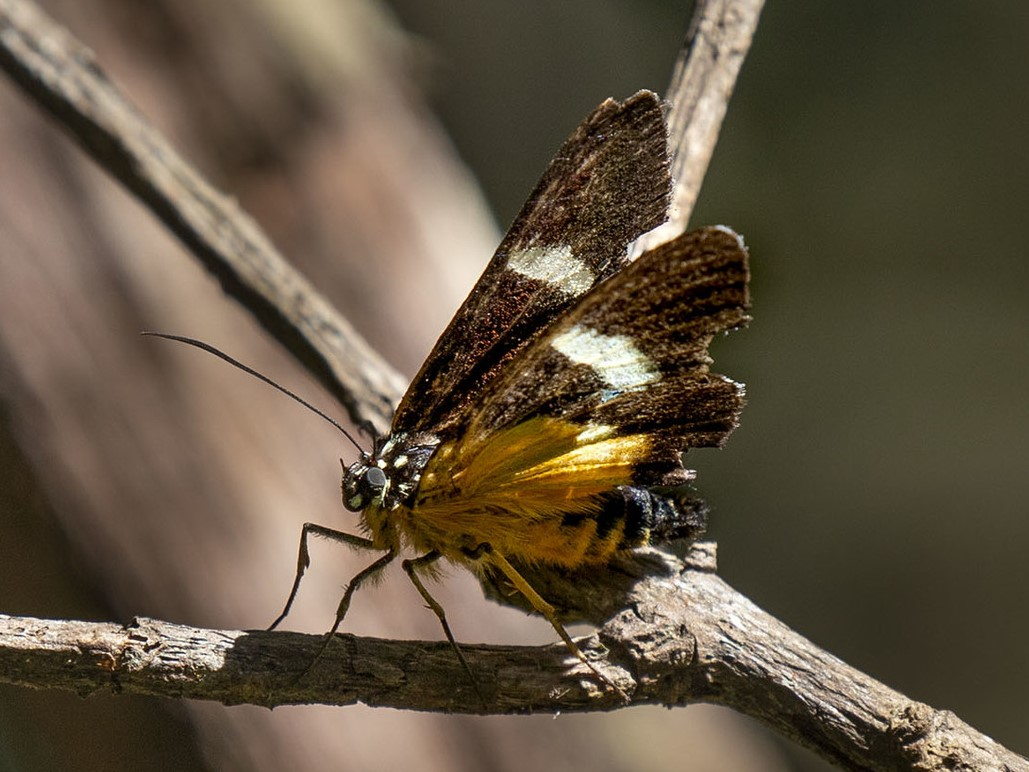
- Rothia micropales

Scientific classification
- Kingdom: Animalia
- Phylum: Arthropoda
- Class: Insecta
- Order: Lepidoptera
- Superfamily: Noctuoidea
- Family: Noctuidae
- Subfamily: Agaristinae
- Genus: Rothia; Westwood, 1877

= Rothia (moth) =

Genus of moths

Rothia is a genus of moths in the family Noctuidae.

== Species ==
- Rothia agrius
- Rothia arrosa
- Rothia caecata
- Rothia cruenta
- Rothia dayremi
- Rothia distigma
- Rothia divisa
- Rothia epiera
- Rothia epipales
- Rothia fianarantsoa
- Rothia hampsoni
- Rothia holli
- Rothia hypopyrrha
- Rothia lasti Kiriakoff, 1974
- Rothia lutescens
- Rothia martha
- Rothia metagrius
- Rothia micropales
- Rothia nigrescens
- Rothia nigrifimbriata
- Rothia pales
- Rothia panganica
- Rothia pedasus
- Rothia powelli
- Rothia rhaeo (Druce, 1894)
- Rothia rhaeoides Kiriakoff, 1974
- Rothia simyra
- Rothia sinefasciata
- Rothia tenuis
- Rothia tranquilla
- Rothia tricolora
- Rothia turlini
- Rothia vaovao
- Rothia viossati
- Rothia virguncula
- Rothia watersi
- Rothia westwoodii Butler, 1879
- Rothia zea
