= Sura rufitibia =

Scientific classification
- Kingdom: Animalia
- Phylum: Arthropoda
- Class: Insecta
- Order: Lepidoptera
- Family: Sesiidae
- Genus: Sura
- Species: S. rufitibia

Binomial name
- Sura rufitibia Hampson, 1919

Species of moth

Sura rufitibia is a moth of the family Sesiidae. It is known from Nigeria.
