= Tesma nigrapex =

Scientific classification
- Kingdom: Animalia
- Phylum: Arthropoda
- Clade: Pancrustacea
- Class: Insecta
- Order: Lepidoptera
- Superfamily: Noctuoidea
- Family: Erebidae
- Subfamily: Arctiinae
- Genus: Tesma
- Species: T. nigrapex

Binomial name
- Tesma nigrapex (Strand, 1912)

Synonyms
- Phryganopsis nigrapex Strand, 1912; Phryganopsis tessmanniana Strand, 1912

Species of moth

Tesma nigrapex is a moth in the subfamily Arctiinae. It was described by Strand in 1912. It is found in Cameroon, Equatorial Guinea and Nigeria.
