= Ptilothyris =

Scientific classification
- Domain: Eukaryota
- Kingdom: Animalia
- Phylum: Arthropoda
- Class: Insecta
- Order: Lepidoptera
- Family: Lecithoceridae
- Genus: Ptilothyris; Walsingham, 1897

Genus of moths

Ptilothyris is a genus of moth in the family Lecithoceridae.

== Species ==
- Ptilothyris aglaocrossa Meyrick, 1935
- Ptilothyris brachysema Meyrick, 1938
- Ptilothyris climacista Meyrick, 1926
- Ptilothyris crocophracta Meyrick, 1938
- Ptilothyris crossoceros Meyrick, 1934
- Ptilothyris loxocasis Meyrick, 1938
- Ptilothyris nausicaa Meyrick, 1926
- Ptilothyris nemophorella Ghesquière, 1940
- Ptilothyris neuroplaca (Meyrick, 1933)
- Ptilothyris porphyrea Ghesquière, 1940
- Ptilothyris purpurea Walsingham, 1897
- Ptilothyris serangota Meyrick, 1932
