= Rothia dayremi =

Scientific classification
- Domain: Eukaryota
- Kingdom: Animalia
- Phylum: Arthropoda
- Class: Insecta
- Order: Lepidoptera
- Superfamily: Noctuoidea
- Family: Noctuidae
- Genus: Rothia
- Species: R. dayremi

Binomial name
- Rothia dayremi (Oberthür, 1909)

Synonyms
- Anaphela dayremi Oberthür, 1909

Species of moth

Rothia dayremi is a moth of the family Noctuidae. This moth occurs in Madagascar.
