= Ptilothyris nemophorella =

Scientific classification
- Kingdom: Animalia
- Phylum: Arthropoda
- Class: Insecta
- Order: Lepidoptera
- Family: Lecithoceridae
- Genus: Ptilothyris
- Species: P. nemophorella

Binomial name
- Ptilothyris nemophorella Ghesquière, 1940

Species of moth

Ptilothyris nemophorella is a moth in the family Lecithoceridae. It was described by Jean Ghesquière in 1940. It is found in the former province of Équateur in the Democratic Republic of the Congo.
