= Palaeosiccia honeyi =

Scientific classification
- Domain: Eukaryota
- Kingdom: Animalia
- Phylum: Arthropoda
- Class: Insecta
- Order: Lepidoptera
- Superfamily: Noctuoidea
- Family: Erebidae
- Subfamily: Arctiinae
- Genus: Palaeosiccia
- Species: P. honeyi

Binomial name
- Palaeosiccia honeyi Kühne, 2007

Species of moth

Palaeosiccia honeyi is a moth of the subfamily Arctiinae. It was described by Lars Kühne in 2007. It is found in Kenya.
