= Rothia zea =

Scientific classification
- Domain: Eukaryota
- Kingdom: Animalia
- Phylum: Arthropoda
- Class: Insecta
- Order: Lepidoptera
- Superfamily: Noctuoidea
- Family: Noctuidae
- Genus: Rothia
- Species: R. zea

Binomial name
- Rothia zea (Herrich-Schäffer, 1853)

Synonyms
- Agarista zea Herrich-Schäffer, 1853

Species of moth

Rothia zea is a moth of the family Noctuidae. This moth is endemic in Madagascar.
