= Rothia nigrescens =

Scientific classification
- Kingdom: Animalia
- Phylum: Arthropoda
- Class: Insecta
- Order: Lepidoptera
- Superfamily: Noctuoidea
- Family: Noctuidae
- Genus: Rothia
- Species: R. nigrescens

Binomial name
- Rothia nigrescens Rothschild, 1896

Synonyms
- Rothia martha Oberthür, 1923

Species of moth

Rothia nigrescens is a moth of the family Noctuidae first described by Walter Rothschild in 1896. This moth occurs in western Madagascar.

This species usually has a wingspan of 27 mm, and the forewings are black, shaped, and they are marked similar as Rothia simyra with one or two creamy dots in the cells, while the hindwings are black and the fringe spotted with white. Palpi, head, thorax and upperside of abdomen are black, underside of body and legs are orange.
