= Ptilothyris climacista =

Scientific classification
- Kingdom: Animalia
- Phylum: Arthropoda
- Clade: Pancrustacea
- Class: Insecta
- Order: Lepidoptera
- Family: Lecithoceridae
- Genus: Ptilothyris
- Species: P. climacista

Binomial name
- Ptilothyris climacista Meyrick, 1926

Species of moth

Ptilothyris climacista is a moth in the family Lecithoceridae. It was described by Edward Meyrick in 1926. It is found in Cameroon.

The wingspan is about 21 mm. The forewings are dark purplish fuscous with a narrow elongate yellow spot extending in the disc from the end of the cell halfway to the apex. The hindwings are dark fuscous with an oblique yellow band from the middle of the dorsum to the middle of the costa, divided by longitudinal streaks of ground colour into three blotches.
