= Cornips agelasta =

Scientific classification
- Kingdom: Animalia
- Phylum: Arthropoda
- Clade: Pancrustacea
- Class: Insecta
- Order: Lepidoptera
- Family: Tortricidae
- Genus: Cornips
- Species: C. agelasta

Binomial name
- Cornips agelasta (Bradley, 1965)

Synonyms
- Niphotixa agelasta Bradley, 1965

Species of moth

Cornips agelasta is a species of moth of the family Tortricidae. It is found in the Ruwenzori Mountains in the border region of the Democratic Republic of Congo and Uganda.
