= Palaeosiccia =

Scientific classification
- Kingdom: Animalia
- Phylum: Arthropoda
- Class: Insecta
- Order: Lepidoptera
- Superfamily: Noctuoidea
- Family: Erebidae
- Subfamily: Arctiinae
- Tribe: Lithosiini
- Genus: Palaeosiccia; Hampson, 1900

Genus of moths

Palaeosiccia is a genus of moths in the subfamily Arctiinae erected by George Hampson in 1900.

== Species ==
- Palaeosiccia honeyi Kühne, 2007
- Palaeosiccia major (Kiriakoff, 1958)
- Palaeosiccia punctata Hampson, 1900
