= Niphothixa amphibola =

Scientific classification
- Domain: Eukaryota
- Kingdom: Animalia
- Phylum: Arthropoda
- Class: Insecta
- Order: Lepidoptera
- Family: Tortricidae
- Genus: Niphothixa
- Species: N. amphibola

Binomial name
- Niphothixa amphibola Diakonoff, 1960

Species of moth

Niphothixa amphibola is a species of moth of the family Tortricidae. It is found on Madagascar.
