= Ptilothyris aglaocrossa =

Scientific classification
- Kingdom: Animalia
- Phylum: Arthropoda
- Clade: Pancrustacea
- Class: Insecta
- Order: Lepidoptera
- Family: Lecithoceridae
- Genus: Ptilothyris
- Species: P. aglaocrossa

Binomial name
- Ptilothyris aglaocrossa Meyrick, 1935

Species of moth

Ptilothyris aglaocrossa is a moth in the family Lecithoceridae. It was described by Edward Meyrick in 1935. It is found in the Democratic Republic of the Congo (Katanga).
