= Sura ruficauda =

Scientific classification
- Domain: Eukaryota
- Kingdom: Animalia
- Phylum: Arthropoda
- Class: Insecta
- Order: Lepidoptera
- Family: Sesiidae
- Genus: Sura
- Species: S. ruficauda

Binomial name
- Sura ruficauda (Rothschild, 1911)

Synonyms
- Aegeria ruficauda Rothschild, 1911

Species of moth

Sura ruficauda is a moth of the family Sesiidae. It is known from Malawi and Tanzania.
