= Amata jacksoni =

Scientific classification
- Domain: Eukaryota
- Kingdom: Animalia
- Phylum: Arthropoda
- Class: Insecta
- Order: Lepidoptera
- Superfamily: Noctuoidea
- Family: Erebidae
- Subfamily: Arctiinae
- Genus: Amata
- Species: A. jacksoni

Binomial name
- Amata jacksoni Rothschild, 1910

Synonyms
- Amata jacsoni Hampson, 1914; Amata mariae Dufrane, 1945

Species of moth

Amata jacksoni is a moth of the family Erebidae. It was described by Rothschild in 1910. It is found in the Democratic Republic of Congo and Uganda.
