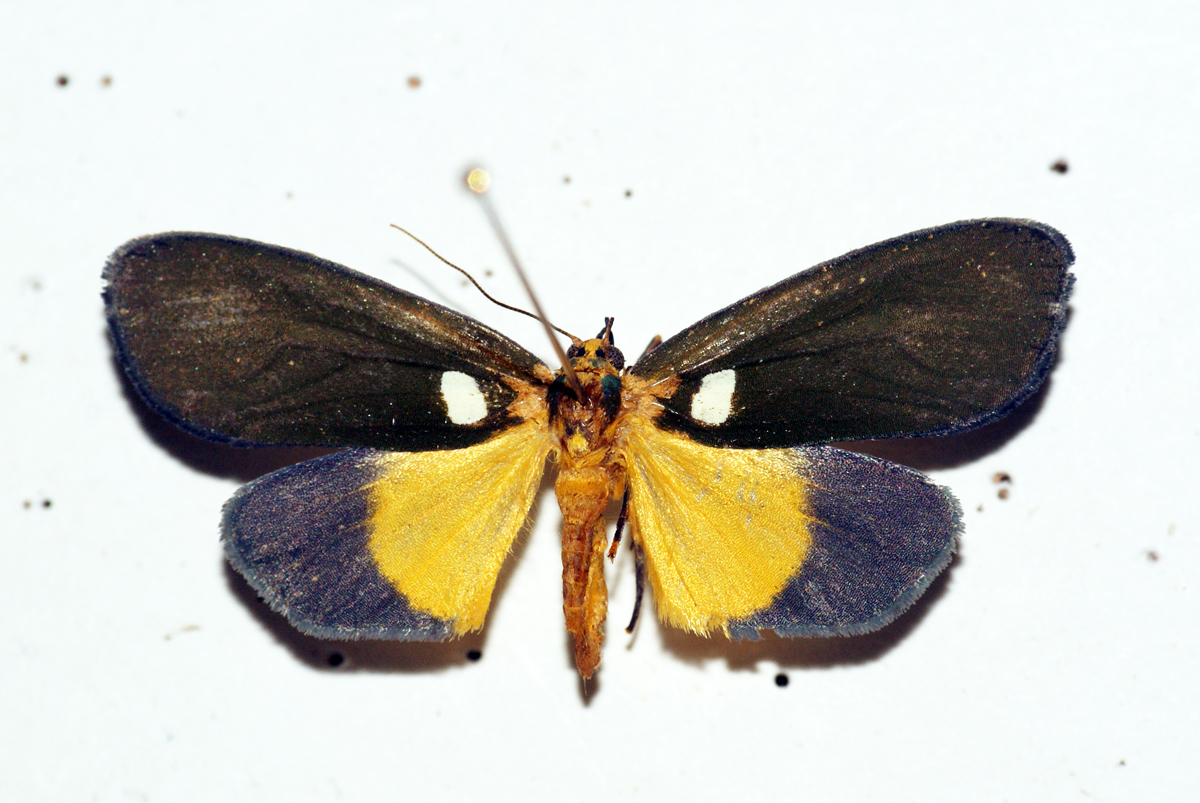

Scientific classification
- Domain: Eukaryota
- Kingdom: Animalia
- Phylum: Arthropoda
- Class: Insecta
- Order: Lepidoptera
- Superfamily: Noctuoidea
- Family: Erebidae
- Subfamily: Arctiinae
- Genus: Carpostalagma
- Species: C. viridis

Binomial name
- Carpostalagma viridis (Plötz, 1880)

Synonyms
- Caryatis viridis Plötz, 1880

= Carpostalagma viridis =

Species of moth

Carpostalagma viridis is a moth of the subfamily Arctiinae. It was described by Plötz in 1880. It is found in Cameroon, the Democratic Republic of Congo, Equatorial Guinea and Uganda.
