= Elachista iriphaea =

Scientific classification
- Kingdom: Animalia
- Phylum: Arthropoda
- Class: Insecta
- Order: Lepidoptera
- Family: Elachistidae
- Genus: Elachista
- Species: E. iriphaea

Binomial name
- Elachista iriphaea (Meyrick, 1932)

Synonyms
- Labdia iriphaea Meyrick, 1932

Species of moth

Elachista iriphaea is a moth of the family Elachistidae. It is found in Uganda.
