= Archithosia tryphosa =

Scientific classification
- Domain: Eukaryota
- Kingdom: Animalia
- Phylum: Arthropoda
- Class: Insecta
- Order: Lepidoptera
- Superfamily: Noctuoidea
- Family: Erebidae
- Subfamily: Arctiinae
- Genus: Archithosia
- Species: A. tryphosa

Binomial name
- Archithosia tryphosa (Kiriakoff, 1958)

Synonyms
- Phryganopsis tryphosa Kiriakoff, 1958; Phryganopsis duplicata Birket-Smith, 1965

Species of moth

Archithosia tryphosa is a moth of the subfamily Arctiinae. It was described by Sergius G. Kiriakoff in 1958. It is found in the Democratic Republic of the Congo and Uganda.
