= Scopula ochreofusa =

Scientific classification
- Kingdom: Animalia
- Phylum: Arthropoda
- Class: Insecta
- Order: Lepidoptera
- Family: Geometridae
- Genus: Scopula
- Species: S. ochreofusa

Binomial name
- Scopula ochreofusa (Warren, 1899)

Synonyms
- Craspedia ochreofusa Warren, 1899

Species of geometer moth in subfamily Sterrhinae

Scopula ochreofusa is a moth of the family Geometridae. It is found in Uganda.
