= Scopula subpectinata =

Scientific classification
- Kingdom: Animalia
- Phylum: Arthropoda
- Clade: Pancrustacea
- Class: Insecta
- Order: Lepidoptera
- Family: Geometridae
- Genus: Scopula
- Species: S. subpectinata

Binomial name
- Scopula subpectinata (Prout, 1915)

Synonyms
- Acidalia subpectinata Prout 1915

Species of geometer moth in subfamily Sterrhinae

Scopula subpectinata is a moth of the family Geometridae. It is found in Uganda.
