= Scopula improba =

Scientific classification
- Kingdom: Animalia
- Phylum: Arthropoda
- Class: Insecta
- Order: Lepidoptera
- Family: Geometridae
- Genus: Scopula
- Species: S. improba

Binomial name
- Scopula improba (Warren, 1899)

Synonyms
- Craspedia improba Warren, 1899

Species of geometer moth in subfamily Sterrhinae

Scopula improba is a moth of the family Geometridae. It was described by Warren in 1899. It is found in the Republic of the Congo and Uganda.
