= Tesma fractifascia =

Scientific classification
- Kingdom: Animalia
- Phylum: Arthropoda
- Class: Insecta
- Order: Lepidoptera
- Superfamily: Noctuoidea
- Family: Erebidae
- Subfamily: Arctiinae
- Genus: Tesma
- Species: T. fractifascia

Binomial name
- Tesma fractifascia (Hampson, 1918)

Synonyms
- Ilema fractifascia Hampson, 1918; Phryganopsis melema Kiriakoff, 1958

Species of moth

Tesma fractifascia is a species of moth in the subfamily Arctiinae. It was described by George Hampson in 1918. It is found in Cameroon, Nigeria and Uganda.
