= Tamsita habrotima =

Scientific classification
- Domain: Eukaryota
- Kingdom: Animalia
- Phylum: Arthropoda
- Class: Insecta
- Order: Lepidoptera
- Superfamily: Noctuoidea
- Family: Erebidae
- Genus: Tamsita
- Species: T. habrotima

Binomial name
- Tamsita habrotima (Tams, 1930)

Synonyms
- Spilosoma habrotima Tams, 1930

Species of moth

Tamsita habrotima is a moth in the family Erebidae. It was described by Willie Horace Thomas Tams in 1930 and is found in Kenya and Uganda.
