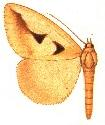

Scientific classification
- Kingdom: Animalia
- Phylum: Arthropoda
- Class: Insecta
- Order: Lepidoptera
- Superfamily: Noctuoidea
- Family: Erebidae
- Genus: Parachalciope
- Species: P. monoplaneta

Binomial name
- Parachalciope monoplaneta Hampson, 1913

= Parachalciope monoplaneta =

Species of moth

Parachalciope monoplaneta is a moth of the family Noctuidae first described by George Hampson in 1913. It is found in the Democratic Republic of the Congo, Uganda and Rwanda.
