= Ptilothyris serangota =

Scientific classification
- Domain: Eukaryota
- Kingdom: Animalia
- Phylum: Arthropoda
- Class: Insecta
- Order: Lepidoptera
- Family: Lecithoceridae
- Genus: Ptilothyris
- Species: P. serangota

Binomial name
- Ptilothyris serangota Meyrick, 1932

Synonyms
- Ptilothyris serangota ab. cyanea Ghesquière, 1940

Species of moth

Ptilothyris serangota is a moth in the family Lecithoceridae. It was described by Edward Meyrick in 1932. It is found in the Democratic Republic of the Congo (North Kivu, Équateur) and Uganda.
