= Acrocercops coloptila =

Scientific classification
- Kingdom: Animalia
- Phylum: Arthropoda
- Class: Insecta
- Order: Lepidoptera
- Family: Gracillariidae
- Genus: Acrocercops
- Species: A. coloptila

Binomial name
- Acrocercops coloptila Meyrick, 1937

Species of moth

Acrocercops coloptila is a moth of the family Gracillariidae. It is known from Uganda.

The larvae feed on Annona squamosa. They probably mine the leaves of their host plant.
