= Hypsidracon saurodoxa =

Scientific classification
- Kingdom: Animalia
- Phylum: Arthropoda
- Class: Insecta
- Order: Lepidoptera
- Family: Tortricidae
- Genus: Hypsidracon
- Species: H. saurodoxa

Binomial name
- Hypsidracon saurodoxa Meyrick, 1934

Synonyms
- Olethreutes orestera Bradley, 1965

Species of moth

Hypsidracon saurodoxa is a species of moth of the family Tortricidae. It is found in the Democratic Republic of Congo.
