= Scopula tricommata =

Scientific classification
- Kingdom: Animalia
- Phylum: Arthropoda
- Class: Insecta
- Order: Lepidoptera
- Family: Geometridae
- Genus: Scopula
- Species: S. tricommata

Binomial name
- Scopula tricommata (Warren, 1899)

Synonyms
- Craspedia tricommata Warren, 1899

Species of geometer moth in subfamily Sterrhinae

Scopula tricommata is a moth of the family Geometridae. It is found in Uganda and Zambia.
