= Scopula erici =

Scientific classification
- Kingdom: Animalia
- Phylum: Arthropoda
- Clade: Pancrustacea
- Class: Insecta
- Order: Lepidoptera
- Family: Geometridae
- Genus: Scopula
- Species: S. erici

Binomial name
- Scopula erici (Kirby, 1896)

Synonyms
- Aletis erici Kirby, 1896; Cartaletis libyssa euparypha Prout, 1913

Species of geometer moth in subfamily Sterrhinae

Scopula erici is a moth of the family Geometridae. It is found in Uganda and the Republic of Congo.

== Subspecies ==
- Scopula erici erici (Uganda)
- Scopula erici euparypha (Prout, 1913) (Republic of Congo)
