= Palaeosiccia major =

Scientific classification
- Domain: Eukaryota
- Kingdom: Animalia
- Phylum: Arthropoda
- Class: Insecta
- Order: Lepidoptera
- Superfamily: Noctuoidea
- Family: Erebidae
- Subfamily: Arctiinae
- Genus: Palaeosiccia
- Species: P. major

Binomial name
- Palaeosiccia major (Kiriakoff, 1958)

Synonyms
- Manoba major Kiriakoff, 1958

Species of moth

Palaeosiccia major is a moth of the subfamily Arctiinae. It is found in Uganda.
