= Scopula callibotrys =

Scientific classification
- Kingdom: Animalia
- Phylum: Arthropoda
- Class: Insecta
- Order: Lepidoptera
- Family: Geometridae
- Genus: Scopula
- Species: S. callibotrys

Binomial name
- Scopula callibotrys (L. B. Prout, 1918)

Synonyms
- Antitrygodes callibotrys Prout, 1918

Species of geometer moth in subfamily Sterrhinae

Scopula callibotrys is a moth of the family Geometridae. It was described by Louis Beethoven Prout in 1918. It is found in the Democratic Republic of the Congo and Uganda.
