= Monstruncusarctia decemmaculata =

Scientific classification
- Domain: Eukaryota
- Kingdom: Animalia
- Phylum: Arthropoda
- Class: Insecta
- Order: Lepidoptera
- Superfamily: Noctuoidea
- Family: Erebidae
- Subfamily: Arctiinae
- Genus: Monstruncusarctia
- Species: M. decemmaculata

Binomial name
- Monstruncusarctia decemmaculata (Rothschild, 1916)

Synonyms
- Diacrisia decemmaculata Rothschild, 1916; Paralacydes decemmaculata

Species of moth

Monstruncusarctia decemmaculata is a moth of the family Erebidae. It was described by Rothschild in 1916. It is found in the Democratic Republic of Congo, Kenya, Tanzania and Uganda.
