= Scopula ansorgei =

Scientific classification
- Kingdom: Animalia
- Phylum: Arthropoda
- Class: Insecta
- Order: Lepidoptera
- Family: Geometridae
- Genus: Scopula
- Species: S. ansorgei

Binomial name
- Scopula ansorgei (Warren, 1899)

Synonyms
- Chlorocraspedia ansorgei Warren, 1899

Species of geometer moth in subfamily Sterrhinae

Scopula ansorgei is a moth of the family Geometridae. It was described by Warren in 1899. It is found in Uganda.
