= Niphothixa ophina =

Scientific classification
- Domain: Eukaryota
- Kingdom: Animalia
- Phylum: Arthropoda
- Class: Insecta
- Order: Lepidoptera
- Family: Tortricidae
- Genus: Niphothixa
- Species: N. ophina

Binomial name
- Niphothixa ophina Bradley, 1965

Species of moth

Niphothixa ophina is a species of moth of the family Tortricidae. It is found in Uganda.
