= Pyrausta gazalis =

Scientific classification
- Kingdom: Animalia
- Phylum: Arthropoda
- Clade: Pancrustacea
- Class: Insecta
- Order: Lepidoptera
- Family: Crambidae
- Genus: Pyrausta
- Species: P. gazalis

Binomial name
- Pyrausta gazalis Hampson, 1913

Species of moth

Pyrausta gazalis is a moth in the family Crambidae. It was described by George Hampson in 1913. It is found in Uganda and Zimbabwe.
