= Sura lampadura =

Scientific classification
- Kingdom: Animalia
- Phylum: Arthropoda
- Class: Insecta
- Order: Lepidoptera
- Family: Sesiidae
- Genus: Sura
- Species: S. lampadura

Binomial name
- Sura lampadura Meyrick, 1935

Species of moth

Sura lampadura is a moth of the family Sesiidae. It is known from Uganda.
