= Scopula albida =

Scientific classification
- Kingdom: Animalia
- Phylum: Arthropoda
- Class: Insecta
- Order: Lepidoptera
- Family: Geometridae
- Genus: Scopula
- Species: S. albida

Binomial name
- Scopula albida (Warren, 1899)

Synonyms
- Induna albida Warren, 1899; Induna pura Swinhoe, 1909

Species of geometer moth in subfamily Sterrhinae

Scopula albida is a moth of the family Geometridae. It was described by Warren in 1899. It is endemic to Uganda.
