= Amata kenredi =

Scientific classification
- Domain: Eukaryota
- Kingdom: Animalia
- Phylum: Arthropoda
- Class: Insecta
- Order: Lepidoptera
- Superfamily: Noctuoidea
- Family: Erebidae
- Subfamily: Arctiinae
- Genus: Amata
- Species: A. kenredi

Binomial name
- Amata kenredi (Rothschild, 1910)

Synonyms
- Amata cenredi Hampson, 1914

Species of moth

Amata kenredi is a moth of the family Erebidae. It was described by Rothschild in 1910. It is found in the Democratic Republic of Congo and Uganda.
