= Scopula luxipuncta =

Scientific classification
- Kingdom: Animalia
- Phylum: Arthropoda
- Class: Insecta
- Order: Lepidoptera
- Family: Geometridae
- Genus: Scopula
- Species: S. luxipuncta

Binomial name
- Scopula luxipuncta Prout, 1932

Species of geometer moth in subfamily Sterrhinae

Scopula luxipuncta is a moth of the family Geometridae. It is found in the Democratic Republic of Congo and Uganda.
