= Carpostalagma pulverulentus =

Scientific classification
- Domain: Eukaryota
- Kingdom: Animalia
- Phylum: Arthropoda
- Class: Insecta
- Order: Lepidoptera
- Superfamily: Noctuoidea
- Family: Erebidae
- Subfamily: Arctiinae
- Genus: Carpostalagma
- Species: C. pulverulentus

Binomial name
- Carpostalagma pulverulentus Talbot, 1929

Species of moth

Carpostalagma pulverulentus is a moth of the subfamily Arctiinae. It was described by George Talbot in 1929. It is found in Kenya and Uganda.
