= Hoplocentra =

Scientific classification
- Kingdom: Animalia
- Phylum: Arthropoda
- Clade: Pancrustacea
- Class: Insecta
- Order: Lepidoptera
- Family: Tineidae
- Subfamily: Myrmecozelinae
- Genus: Hoplocentra; Gozmány, 1968
- Species: H. mucronata

Binomial name
- Hoplocentra mucronata Gozmány, 1968

Genus of moths

Hoplocentra is a genus of moths belonging to the family Tineidae. It contains only one species, Hoplocentra mucronata, which is found in Uganda.
