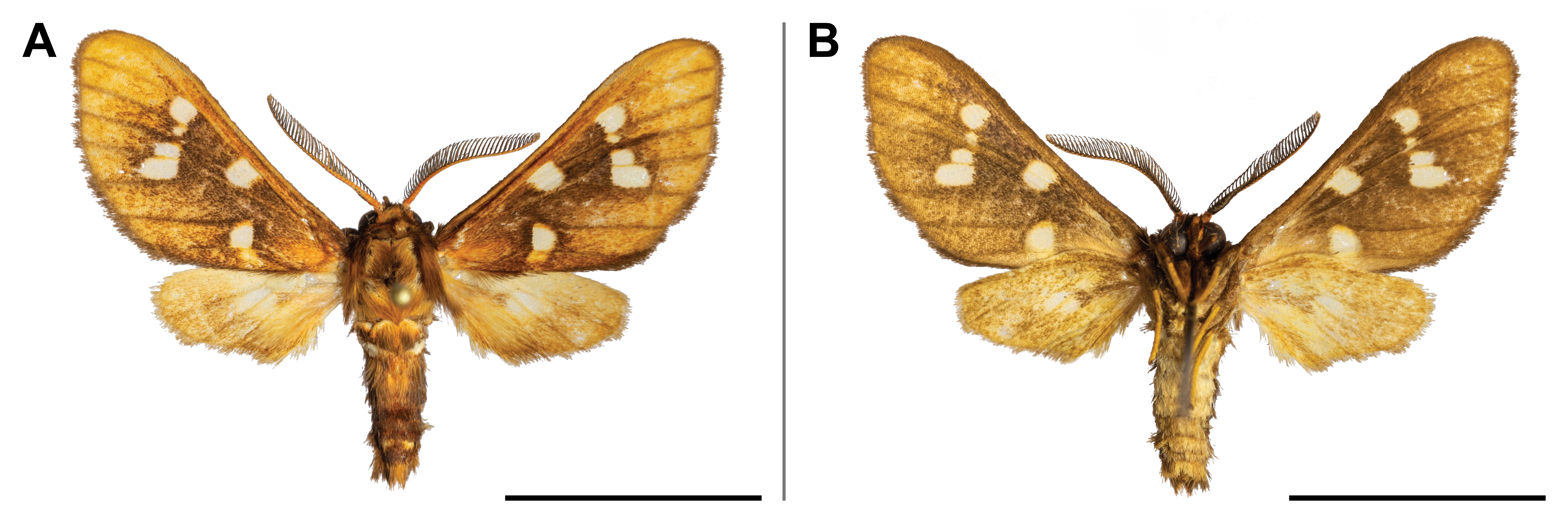

Scientific classification
- Kingdom: Animalia
- Phylum: Arthropoda
- Class: Insecta
- Order: Lepidoptera
- Superfamily: Noctuoidea
- Family: Erebidae
- Subfamily: Arctiinae
- Genus: Anapisa
- Species: A. metarctioides

Binomial name
- Anapisa metarctioides (Hampson, 1907)

Synonyms
- Anapisa metarctioides Hampson, 1907

= Anapisa metarctioides =

Species of moth

Anapisa metarctioides is a moth of the family Erebidae. It was described by George Hampson in 1907. It is found in the Democratic Republic of the Congo, Kenya and Uganda.

Note, the original spelling is Apisa metarctiodes Hampson, 1907, repeated as Apisa metarctiodes (Hampson, 1907) in Hampson, 1914 (and same on plate for fig. 26). Therefore any later adoption of the name as "metarctioides" [with extra i] seems to be an unjustified subsequent spelling.
