= Eois laxipecten =

Scientific classification
- Kingdom: Animalia
- Phylum: Arthropoda
- Clade: Pancrustacea
- Class: Insecta
- Order: Lepidoptera
- Family: Geometridae
- Genus: Eois
- Species: E. laxipecten

Binomial name
- Eois laxipecten Herbulot, 2000

Species of moth

Eois laxipecten is a moth in the family Geometridae. It is found in the Democratic Republic of Congo and Uganda.
