= Sura xanthopyga =

Scientific classification
- Kingdom: Animalia
- Phylum: Arthropoda
- Class: Insecta
- Order: Lepidoptera
- Family: Sesiidae
- Genus: Sura
- Species: S. xanthopyga

Binomial name
- Sura xanthopyga (Hampson, 1919)

Synonyms
- Paranthrene xanthopyga Hampson, 1919

Species of moth

Sura xanthopyga is a moth of the family Sesiidae. It is known from Kenya and Uganda.
