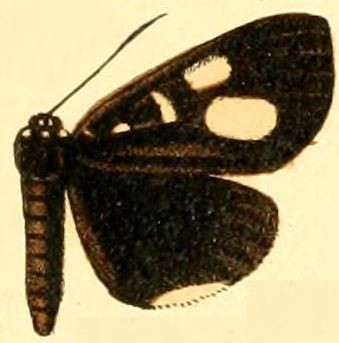

Scientific classification
- Kingdom: Animalia
- Phylum: Arthropoda
- Class: Insecta
- Order: Lepidoptera
- Superfamily: Noctuoidea
- Family: Noctuidae
- Genus: Rothia
- Species: R. rhaeo

Binomial name
- Rothia rhaeo (H. Druce, 1894)

Synonyms
- Agarista rhaeo H. Druce, 1894; Phalaenoides alluaudi Mabille, 1898

= Rothia rhaeo =

Species of moth

Rothia rhaeo is a moth of the family Noctuidae first described by Herbert Druce in 1894. This moth occurs in Madagascar, Uganda and in South Africa.

This species has a wingspan of 35 mm.
