= Phyllonorycter ruwenzori =

Scientific classification
- Kingdom: Animalia
- Phylum: Arthropoda
- Class: Insecta
- Order: Lepidoptera
- Family: Gracillariidae
- Genus: Phyllonorycter
- Species: P. ruwenzori

Binomial name
- Phyllonorycter ruwenzori de Prins, 2012

Species of moth

Phyllonorycter ruwenzori is a moth of the family Gracillariidae. It is found in the Ruwenzori Range in Uganda in mountainous forests at altitudes above 1,000 meters.

The length of the forewings is 2.3–2.5 mm.
