= Hippurarctia ferrigera =

Scientific classification
- Domain: Eukaryota
- Kingdom: Animalia
- Phylum: Arthropoda
- Class: Insecta
- Order: Lepidoptera
- Superfamily: Noctuoidea
- Family: Erebidae
- Subfamily: Arctiinae
- Genus: Hippurarctia
- Species: H. ferrigera

Binomial name
- Hippurarctia ferrigera (H. Druce, 1910)

Synonyms
- Metarctia ferrigera H. Druce, 1910; Automolis ferrigera; Hippurarctia bergeri Kiriakoff, 1953; Automolis diffusa Dufrane, 1952; Hippurarctia overlaeti Kiriakoff, 1953; Hippurarctia vicina Kiriakoff, 1953

Species of moth

Hippurarctia ferrigera is a moth of the family Erebidae. It was described by Herbert Druce in 1910. It is found in Cameroon, the Democratic Republic of the Congo, Kenya and Uganda.
