= Tamsita ochthoeba =

Scientific classification
- Kingdom: Animalia
- Phylum: Arthropoda
- Class: Insecta
- Order: Lepidoptera
- Superfamily: Noctuoidea
- Family: Erebidae
- Genus: Tamsita
- Species: T. ochthoeba

Binomial name
- Tamsita ochthoeba (Hampson, 1920)

Synonyms
- Turuptiana ochthoeba Hampson, 1920

Species of moth

Tamsita ochthoeba is a moth in the family Erebidae. It was described by George Hampson in 1920. It is found in Burundi, Cameroon, the Democratic Republic of the Congo, Kenya, Uganda and Zambia.
