= Metatacha =

Scientific classification
- Kingdom: Animalia
- Phylum: Arthropoda
- Class: Insecta
- Order: Lepidoptera
- Superfamily: Noctuoidea
- Family: Noctuidae (?)
- Subfamily: Catocalinae
- Genus: Metatacha; Hampson, 1913
- Species: M. excavata

Binomial name
- Metatacha excavata Bethune-Baker, 1909

Genus of moths

Metatacha is a monotypic moth genus of the family Noctuidae erected by George Hampson in 1913. Its only species, Metatacha excavata, was first described by George Thomas Bethune-Baker in 1909. It is found in the Democratic Republic of the Congo and Uganda.
