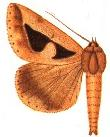

Scientific classification
- Kingdom: Animalia
- Phylum: Arthropoda
- Class: Insecta
- Order: Lepidoptera
- Superfamily: Noctuoidea
- Family: Erebidae
- Genus: Parachalciope
- Species: P. binaria

Binomial name
- Parachalciope binaria (Holland, 1894)

Synonyms
- Trigonodes binaria Holland, 1894

= Parachalciope binaria =

Species of moth

Parachalciope binaria is a moth of the family Noctuidae first described by William Jacob Holland in 1894. It is found in the Democratic Republic of the Congo, Gabon, Nigeria, Uganda and Cameroon.
