= Elachista oritropha =

Scientific classification
- Kingdom: Animalia
- Phylum: Arthropoda
- Class: Insecta
- Order: Lepidoptera
- Family: Elachistidae
- Genus: Elachista
- Species: E. oritropha

Binomial name
- Elachista oritropha Bradley, 1965

Species of moth

Elachista oritropha is a moth of the family Elachistidae that is endemic to Uganda.
