= Eupithecia connexa =

Scientific classification
- Kingdom: Animalia
- Phylum: Arthropoda
- Class: Insecta
- Order: Lepidoptera
- Family: Geometridae
- Genus: Eupithecia
- Species: E. connexa

Binomial name
- Eupithecia connexa (Warren, 1899)

Synonyms
- Tephroclystia connexa Warren, 1899

Species of moth

Eupithecia connexa is a moth in the family Geometridae. It is found in the Democratic Republic of Congo, Ghana, Ivory Coast, Kenya and Uganda.
