= Phyllonorycter fletcheri =

Scientific classification
- Kingdom: Animalia
- Phylum: Arthropoda
- Class: Insecta
- Order: Lepidoptera
- Family: Gracillariidae
- Genus: Phyllonorycter
- Species: P. fletcheri

Binomial name
- Phyllonorycter fletcheri de Prins, 2012

Species of moth

Phyllonorycter fletcheri is a moth of the family Gracillariidae. It is found in Uganda (the Ruwenzori Range) in mountainous forests at altitude above 1,000 meters.

The length of the forewings is 2.6 mm.
