= Mimocrypta =

Scientific classification
- Kingdom: Animalia
- Phylum: Arthropoda
- Class: Insecta
- Order: Lepidoptera
- Family: Sesiidae
- Genus: Mimocrypta; Naumann, 1971
- Species: M. hampsoni

Binomial name
- Mimocrypta hampsoni (Butler, 1902)

Synonyms
- Cryptomima hampsoni Butler, 1902

Genus of moths

Mimocrypta is a genus of moths in the family Sesiidae containing only one species, Mimocrypta hampsoni, which is known from Uganda.
