= Cornips dryocausta =

Scientific classification
- Kingdom: Animalia
- Phylum: Arthropoda
- Clade: Pancrustacea
- Class: Insecta
- Order: Lepidoptera
- Family: Tortricidae
- Genus: Cornips
- Species: C. dryocausta

Binomial name
- Cornips dryocausta (Meyrick, 1938)

Synonyms
- Tortrix dryocausta Meyrick, 1938; Niphothixa dryocausta; Niphotixa dryocausta

Species of moth

Cornips dryocausta is a species of moth of the family Tortricidae. It is found in the Democratic Republic of Congo and Uganda.
