= List of moths of Ivory Coast =

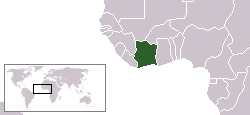
Location of Ivory Coast

There are about 420 known moth species of Ivory Coast. The moths (mostly nocturnal) and butterflies (mostly diurnal) together make up the taxonomic order Lepidoptera.

This is a list of moth species which have been recorded in Ivory Coast.

== Arctiidae ==
- Acantharctia lacteata Rothschild, 1933
- Acantharctia mundata (Walker, 1865)
- Afrasura discocellularis (Strand, 1912)
- Afroarctia sjostedti (Aurivillius, 1900)
- Afrowatsonius marginalis (Walker, 1855)
- Alpenus maculosa (Stoll, 1781)
- Amata stictoptera Rothschild, 1910
- Amerila brunnea (Hampson, 1901)
- Amerila fennia (Druce, 1887)
- Amerila luteibarba (Hampson, 1901)
- Amerila niveivitrea (Bartel, 1903)
- Amerila puella (Fabricius, 1793)
- Amerila roseomarginata (Rothschild, 1910)
- Amerila rothi (Rothschild, 1910)
- Amerila vidua (Cramer, 1780)
- Amerila vitrea Plötz, 1880
- Argina amanda (Boisduval, 1847)
- Balacra flavimacula Walker, 1856
- Balacra herona (Druce, 1887)
- Balacra preussi (Aurivillius, 1904)
- Balacra pulchra Aurivillius, 1892
- Balacra rubricincta Holland, 1893
- Creatonotos leucanioides Holland, 1893
- Epilacydes pseudoscita Dubatolov, 2006
- Metarctia didyma Kiriakoff, 1957
- Metarctia sheljuzhkoi Kiriakoff, 1961
- Nanna griseata Kühne, 2007
- Pseudothyretes perpusilla (Walker, 1856)
- Rhipidarctia invaria (Walker, 1856)
- Spilosoma curvilinea Walker, 1855
- Spilosoma immaculata Bartel, 1903
- Spilosoma togoensis Bartel, 1903
- Teracotona pardalina Bartel, 1903

== Brahmaeidae ==
- Dactyloceras lucina (Drury, 1872)

== Crambidae ==
- Achyra massalis (Walker, 1859)
- Agrotera fumosa Hampson, 1898
- Calamotropha lempkei Schouten, 1993
- Calamotropha snelleni Schouten, 1993
- Calamotropha toonderi Schouten, 1993
- Cnaphalocrocis poeyalis (Boisduval, 1833)
- Culladia troglodytellus (Snellen, 1872)
- Culladiella anjai Schouten, 1993
- Elophila africalis (Hampson, 1906)
- Eoophyla tetropalis (Hampson, 1906)
- Eoophyla tripunctalis (Snellen, 1872)
- Euchromius gnathosellus Schouten, 1988
- Euchromius zephyrus Błeszyński, 1962
- Glyphodes onychinalis (Guenée, 1854)
- Haritalodes polycymalis (Hampson, 1912)
- Nymphicula perirrorata (Hampson, 1917)
- Palpita elealis (Walker, 1859)
- Parapoynx bipunctalis (Hampson, 1906)
- Parapoynx stagnalis (Zeller, 1852)
- Pardomima amyntusalis (Walker, 1859)
- Pardomima callixantha Martin, 1955
- Pardomima distortana (Strand, 1913)
- Pardomima phaeoparda Martin, 1955
- Pardomima phalaromima (Meyrick, 1933)
- Pardomima telanepsia Martin, 1955
- Phryganodes biguttata Hampson, 1898
- Pleuroptya balteata (Fabricius, 1798)
- Poliobotys ablactalis (Walker, 1859)
- Psara brunnealis (Hampson, 1913)
- Pseudocatharylla nemesis Błeszyński, 1964
- Pseudonoorda edulis Maes & Poligui, 2012
- Pygospila tyres (Cramer, 1780)
- Scirpophaga occidentella (Walker, 1863)
- Sufetula nigrescens Hampson, 1912
- Syllepte glebalis (Lederer, 1863)
- Syllepte ovialis (Walker, 1859)
- Syllepte retractalis (Hampson, 1912)
- Syllepte torsipex (Hampson, 1898)
- Syllepte xanthothorax (Meyrick, 1933)
- Synclera traducalis (Zeller, 1852)
- Ulopeza conigeralis Zeller, 1852
- Zebronia phenice (Cramer, 1780)

== Drepanidae ==
- Callidrepana serena Watson, 1965
- Epicampoptera difficilis Hering, 1934
- Epicampoptera ivoirensis Watson, 1965
- Epicampoptera marantica (Tams, 1930)
- Epicampoptera strandi Bryk, 1913
- Gonoreta differenciata (Bryk, 1913)
- Gonoreta opacifinis Watson, 1965
- Gonoreta subtilis (Bryk, 1913)
- Isospidia angustipennis (Warren, 1904)
- Negera bimaculata Holland 1893
- Negera confusa Walker, 1855
- Negera natalensis (Felder, 1874)
- Spidia fenestrata Butler, 1878
- Spidia planola Watson, 1965
- Spidia subviridis (Warren, 1899)
- Uranometra oculata (Holland, 1893)

== Eupterotidae ==
- Stenoglene nivalis (Rothschild, 1917)
- Stenoglene roseus (Druce, 1886)
- Urojana eborea Gaede, 1915

== Euteliidae ==
- Chlumetia griseapicata Laporte, 1970
- Eutelia guerouti Laporte, 1970
- Eutelia hayesi Laporte, 1970
- Eutelia subrubens (Mabille, 1890)

== Geometridae ==
- Bathycolpodes explanata Herbulot, 1986
- Bathycolpodes semigrisea (Warren, 1897)
- Bathycolpodes vuattouxi Herbulot, 1972
- Chiasmia impar (Warren, 1897)
- Chiasmia rectilinea (Warren, 1905)
- Chlorissa allochroma Prout, 1920
- Chlorodrepana pauliani Herbulot, 1972
- Cleora rostella D. S. Fletcher, 1967
- Comibaena hemictenes Prout, 1917
- Comostolopsis stillata (Felder & Rogenhofer, 1875)
- Cyclophora dewitzi (Prout, 1920)
- Cyclophora poeciloptera (Prout, 1920)
- Dithecodes ornithospila (Prout, 1911)
- Epigynopteryx tabitha Warren, 1901
- Eupithecia atomaria (Warren, 1902)
- Geolyces convexaria (Mabille, 1890)
- Lathochlora perversa Prout, 1915
- Megadrepana cinerea Holland, 1893
- Melinoessa amplissimata (Walker, 1863)
- Melinoessa aureola Prout, 1934
- Mesothisa graciliinea Warren, 1905
- Metallochlora misera Prout, 1920
- Miantochora picturata Herbulot, 1985
- Oxyfidonia despecta (Warren, 1905)
- Plegapteryx anomalus Herrich-Schäffer, 1856
- Prasinocyma rhodocycla Prout, 1917
- Racotis angulosa Herbulot, 1973
- Racotis squalida (Butler, 1878)
- Racotis zebrina Warren, 1899
- Scopula acidalia (Holland, 1894)
- Scopula anoista (Prout, 1915)
- Scopula fimbrilineata (Warren, 1902)
- Scopula paradelpharia Prout, 1920
- Scopula pseudophema Prout, 1920
- Scopula pyraliata (Warren, 1898)
- Scopula rufinubes (Warren, 1900)
- Scopula supina Prout, 1920
- Unnamed genus Ennominae contenta (Prout, 1915)
- Zamarada acalantis Herbulot, 2001
- Zamarada acrochra Prout, 1928
- Zamarada adumbrata D. S. Fletcher, 1974
- Zamarada amymone Prout, 1934
- Zamarada antimima D. S. Fletcher, 1974
- Zamarada bicuspida D. S. Fletcher, 1974
- Zamarada bonaberiensis Strand, 1915
- Zamarada corroborata Herbulot, 1954
- Zamarada crystallophana Mabille, 1900
- Zamarada cucharita D. S. Fletcher, 1974
- Zamarada cydippe Herbulot, 1954
- Zamarada dentigera Warren, 1909
- Zamarada dilucida Warren, 1909
- Zamarada dyscapna D. S. Fletcher, 1974
- Zamarada emaciata D. S. Fletcher, 1974
- Zamarada eucharis (Drury, 1782)
- Zamarada euerces Prout, 1928
- Zamarada euphrosyne Oberthür, 1912
- Zamarada geitaina D. S. Fletcher, 1974
- Zamarada ignicosta Prout, 1912
- Zamarada indicata D. S. Fletcher, 1974
- Zamarada ixiaria Swinhoe, 1904
- Zamarada karischi Herbulot, 1998
- Zamarada labifera Prout, 1915
- Zamarada leona Gaede, 1915
- Zamarada lepta D. S. Fletcher, 1974
- Zamarada melanopyga Herbulot, 1954
- Zamarada melpomene Oberthür, 1912
- Zamarada mimesis D. S. Fletcher, 1974
- Zamarada nasuta Warren, 1897
- Zamarada paxilla D. S. Fletcher, 1974
- Zamarada perlepidata (Walker, 1863)
- Zamarada platycephala D. S. Fletcher, 1974
- Zamarada protrusa Warren, 1897
- Zamarada reflexaria (Walker, 1863)
- Zamarada regularis D. S. Fletcher, 1974
- Zamarada sicula D. S. Fletcher, 1974
- Zamarada subinterrupta Gaede, 1915
- Zamarada suda D. S. Fletcher, 1974
- Zamarada triangularis Gaede, 1915
- Zamarada vulpina Warren, 1897
- Zamarada xyele D. S. Fletcher, 1974

== Gracillariidae ==
- Phyllocnistis citrella Stainton, 1856

== Lasiocampidae ==
- Cheligium nigrescens (Aurivillius, 1909)
- Cheligium sansei Zolotuhin & Gurkovich, 2009
- Cleopatrina bilinea (Walker, 1855)
- Filiola dogma Zolotuhin & Gurkovich, 2009
- Filiola fulgurata (Aurivillius, 1909)
- Filiola lanceolata (Hering, 1932)
- Filiola occidentale (Strand, 1912)
- Gelo calcarales Zolotuhin & Prozorov, 2010
- Gonopacha brotoessa (Holland, 1893)
- Grellada imitans (Aurivillius, 1893)
- Lechriolepis tamsi Talbot, 1927
- Morongea avoniffi (Tams, 1929)
- Morongea flavipicta (Tams, 1929)
- Morongea mastodont Zolotuhin & Prozorov, 2010
- Muzunguja rectilineata (Aurivillius, 1900)
- Odontocheilopteryx haribda Gurkovich & Zolotuhin, 2009
- Odontocheilopteryx phoneus Hering, 1928
- Opisthodontia diva Zolotuhin & Prozorov, 2010
- Opisthodontia sidha Zolotuhin & Prozorov, 2010
- Pachyna subfascia (Walker, 1855)
- Pachytrina honrathii (Dewitz, 1881)
- Pachytrina ornata Zolotuhin & Gurkovich, 2009
- Pachytrina wenigina Zolotuhin & Gurkovich, 2009
- Sonitha libera (Aurivillius, 1914)
- Stenophatna dentata (Aurivillius, 1899)
- Stenophatna hollandi (Tams, 1929)
- Stenophatna kahli (Tams, 1929)
- Stoermeriana amblycalymma (Tams, 1936)
- Theophasida cardinalli (Tams, 1926)
- Theophasida serafim Zolotuhin & Prozorov, 2010

== Limacodidae ==
- Halseyia extenuata (Hering, 1937)

== Lymantriidae ==
- Aroa discalis Walker, 1855
- Aroa eugonia Collenette, 1953
- Batella muscosa (Holland, 1893)
- Cifuna marginenotata Hering, 1926
- Dasychira chorista Hering, 1926
- Dasychira clathrata (Holland, 1893)
- Dasychira gonophoroides Collenette, 1939
- Dasychira hodoepora Collenette, 1960
- Dasychira laeliopsis Hering, 1926
- Dasychira omissa Hering, 1926
- Dasychira pais Hering, 1926
- Dasychira pollux Hering, 1926
- Dasychira punctifera (Walker, 1857)
- Eudasychira georgiana (Fawcett, 1900)
- Euproctis conizona Collenette, 1933
- Euproctis dewitzi (Grünberg, 1907)
- Griveaudyria ila (Swinhoe, 1904)
- Lomadonta citrago Hering, 1926
- Marbla paradoxa (Hering, 1926)
- Naroma varipes (Walker, 1865)
- Orgyia vaporata Hering, 1926
- Otroeda hesperia (Cramer, 1779)
- Paqueta chloroscia (Hering, 1926)
- Pseudonotodonta virescens (Möschler, 1887)
- Rahona hecqui Dall'Asta, 1981
- Stracena promelaena (Holland, 1893)

== Metarbelidae ==
- Haberlandia hollowayi Lehmann, 2011
- Haberlandia janzi Lehmann, 2011
- Haberlandia tempeli Lehmann, 2011
- Haberlandia taiensis Lehmann, 2011
- Lebedodes wichgrafi (Grünberg, 1910)
- Salagena fuscata Gaede, 1929

== Noctuidae ==
- Achaea albicilia (Walker, 1858)
- Acontia citrelinea Bethune-Baker, 1911
- Acontia eburnea Hacker, 2010
- Acontia fastrei Hacker, Legrain & Fibiger, 2010
- Acontia wahlbergi Wallengren, 1856
- Agrapha polycampta (Dufay, 1972)
- Aegocera rectilinea Boisduval, 1836
- Aletia vuattouxi (Laporte, 1973)
- Amazonides atrisignoides Laporte, 1974
- Apaegocera argyrogramma Hampson, 1905
- Argyrogramma subaerea Dufay, 1972
- Asota speciosa (Drury, 1773)
- Aspidifrontia lamtoensis Laporte, 1974
- Audea kathrina Kühne, 2005
- Audea paulumnodosa Kühne, 2005
- Busseola fusca (Fuller, 1901)
- Cerocala albicornis Berio, 1966
- Crameria amabilis (Drury, 1773)
- Diparopsis watersi (Rothschild, 1901)
- Dysgonia pudica (Möschler, 1887)
- Feliniopsis ivoriensis (Laporte, 1973)
- Helicoverpa assulta (Guenée, 1852)
- Heraclia geryon (Fabricius, 1781)
- Heraclia longipennis (Walker, 1854)
- Hypena laceratalis Walker, 1859
- Hypena obacerralis Walker, [1859]
- Janseodes melanospila (Guenée, 1852)
- Marcipa aequatorialis Pelletier, 1975
- Marcipalina albescens (Pelletier, 1975)
- Massaga monteirona Butler, 1874
- Metagarista triphaenoides Walker, 1854
- Mitrophrys magna (Walker, 1854)
- Mythimna languida (Walker, 1858)
- Omphaloceps triangularis (Mabille, 1893)
- Oraesia cerne (Fawcett, 1916)
- Oruza divisa (Walker, 1862)
- Phaegorista leucomelas (Herrich-Schäffer, 1855)
- Pseudoarcte melanis (Mabille, 1890)
- Sarothroceras banaka (Plötz, 1880)
- Schausia gladiatoria (Holland, 1893)
- Serrodes trispila (Mabille, 1890)
- Spodoptera exigua (Hübner, 1808)
- Thiacidas berenice (Fawcett, 1916)
- Thiacidas dukei (Pinhey, 1968)
- Thiacidas ivoiriana Hacker & Zilli, 2010
- Thiacidas juvenis Hacker & Zilli, 2007
- Thiacidas legraini Hacker & Zilli, 2007
- Thiacidas mukim (Berio, 1977)
- Thiacidas occidentalis Hacker & Zilli, 2010
- Thiacidas schausi (Hampson, 1905)
- Thiacidas senex (Bethune-Baker, 1911)
- Ugia duplicilinea Hampson, 1926

== Notodontidae ==
- Acrasiella curvilinea (Swinhoe, 1907)
- Afroplitis orestes (Kiriakoff, 1955)
- Amphiphalera leuconephra Hampson, 1910
- Anaphe etiennei Schouteden, 1912
- Anaphe reticulata Walker, 1855
- Anaphe venata Butler, 1878
- Andocidia tabernaria Kiriakoff, 1958
- Antheua bidentata (Hampson, 1910)
- Antheua bossumensis (Gaede, 1915)
- Antheua extenuata Walker, 1869
- Antheua simplex Walker, 1855
- Antheua trifasciata (Hampson, 1909)
- Archinadata aurivilliusi (Kiriakoff, 1954)
- Arciera grisea (Holland, 1893)
- Atrasana pujoli Kiriakoff, 1964
- Belisaria camerunica Kiriakoff, 1965
- Bernardita albiplagiata (Gaede, 1928)
- Boscawenia bryki (Schultze, 1934)
- Boscawenia incerta (Schultze, 1934)
- Boscawenia jaspidea (Schultze, 1934)
- Boscawenia latifasciata (Gaede, 1928)
- Boscawenia rectangulata (Gaede, 1928)
- Bostrychogyna bella (Bethune-Baker, 1913)
- Brachychira dives Kiriakoff, 1960
- Brachychira excellens (Rothschild, 1917)
- Catarctia biseriata (Plötz, 1880)
- Catarctia divisa (Walker, 1855)
- Catarctia terminipuncta Hampson, 1910
- Cerurina marshalli (Hampson, 1910)
- Chlorochadisra chlorochroa Kiriakoff, 1968
- Chlorochadisra viridipulverea (Gaede, 1928)
- Crestonica bicolor Kiriakoff, 1968
- Crestonica circulosa (Gaede, 1928)
- Daulopaectes trichosa (Hampson, 1910)
- Deinarchia apateloides (Holland, 1893)
- Desmeocraera albicans Gaede, 1928
- Desmeocraera amaura Kiriakoff, 1968
- Desmeocraera bimaculata Kiriakoff, 1968
- Desmeocraera chloeropsis (Holland, 1893)
- Desmeocraera congoana Aurivillius, 1900
- Desmeocraera invaria Kiriakoff, 1958
- Desmeocraera latex (Druce, 1901)
- Desmeocraera latifasciata Gaede, 1928
- Desmeocraera leucophaea Gaede, 1928
- Desmeocraera oleacea Kiriakoff, 1958
- Desmeocraera varia (Walker, 1855)
- Desmeocraera vernalis Distant, 1897
- Desmeocraerula senicula Kiriakoff, 1963
- Elaphrodes duplex (Gaede, 1928)
- Elaphrodes nephocrossa Bethune-Baker, 1909
- Enomotarcha chloana (Holland, 1893)
- Epanaphe carteri (Walsingham, 1885)
- Epanaphe clara (Holland, 1893)
- Epicerura pulverulenta (Hampson, 1910)
- Epidonta brunneomixta (Mabille, 1897)
- Epidonta transversa (Gaede, 1928)
- Epimetula albipuncta (Gaede, 1928)
- Eurystaura albipuncta Kiriakoff, 1968
- Eurystaura dysstroma Kiriakoff, 1968
- Eurystauridia olivacea (Gaede, 1928)
- Eurystauridia viola (Kiriakoff, 1962)
- Gargettoscrancia albolineata (Strand, 1912)
- Harpandrya aeola Bryk, 1913
- Harpandrya gemella Kiriakoff, 1966
- Harpandrya recussa Kiriakoff, 1966
- Iphigeniella prasina Kiriakoff, 1962
- Iridoplitis iridescens Kiriakoff, 1955
- Janthinisca flavipennis (Hampson, 1910)
- Janthinisca griveaudi Kiriakoff, 1968
- Leptonadatoides incurvata Kiriakoff, 1968
- Liriochroa veronica Kiriakoff, 1968
- Notoxantha sesamiodes Hampson, 1910
- Odontoperas lineata Kiriakoff, 1968
- Odontoperas luteimacula Kiriakoff, 1964
- Odontoperas obliqualinea (Bethune-Baker, 1911)
- Odontoperas rosacea Kiriakoff, 1959
- Odontoperas rubricosta Kiriakoff, 1959
- Paradiastema nigrocincta Aurivillius, 1901
- Paradiastema pulverea Hampson, 1910
- Parascrancia chadisroides Kiriakoff, 1968
- Parastaura divisa Gaede, 1928
- Peratodonta olivacea Gaede, 1928
- Polelassothys callista Tams, 1930
- Pseudoscrancia africana (Holland, 1893)
- Pygaerina lamto Kiriakoff, 1968
- Pygaerina lugubris Gaede, 1928
- Pygaerina nigridorsa Kiriakoff, 1968
- Quista subcarnea Kiriakoff, 1968
- Rasemia macrodonta (Hampson, 1909)
- Rhenea arcuata Kiriakoff, 1968
- Scalmicauda albunea Kiriakoff, 1968
- Scalmicauda andraemon Kiriakoff, 1968
- Scalmicauda benga Holland, 1893
- Scalmicauda bicolorata Gaede, 1928
- Scalmicauda decorata Kiriakoff, 1962
- Scalmicauda hoesemanni (Strand, 1911)
- Scalmicauda tessmanni (Strand, 1911)
- Scrancia arcuata Kiriakoff, 1962
- Scrancia buteo Kiriakoff, 1968
- Scrancia dryotriorchis Kiriakoff, 1968
- Scrancia modesta Holland, 1893
- Scrancia stictica Hampson, 1910
- Scrancia tridens Kiriakoff, 1963
- Scrancia viridis Gaede, 1928
- Scranciola rufula (Hampson, 1910)
- Someropsis viriditincta Strand, 1912
- Stemmatophalera semiflava (Hampson, 1910)
- Synete dirki Kiriakoff, 1959
- Synete strix Kiriakoff, 1968
- Synete vaumaculata Kiriakoff, 1962
- Tmetopteryx bisecta (Rothschild, 1917)
- Tricholoba immodica Strand, 1911
- Tricholoba trisignata Strand, 1911

== Pterophoridae ==
- Cosmoclostis schouteni Gielis, 1990
- Exelastis vuattouxi Bigot, 1970
- Lantanophaga pusillidactylus (Walker, 1864)
- Megalorhipida leucodactylus (Fabricius, 1794)
- Pterophorus albidus (Zeller, 1852)
- Pterophorus candidalis (Walker, 1864)
- Pterophorus lampra (Bigot, 1969)
- Sphenarches anisodactylus (Walker, 1864)
- Stenoptilia bandamae Bigot, 1964
- Stenoptilodes taprobanes (Felder & Rogenhofer, 1875)

== Pyralidae ==
- Endotricha vinolentalis Ragonot, 1891
- Mussidia nigrivenella Ragonot, 1888

== Saturniidae ==
- Epiphora bedoci (Bouvier, 1829)
- Epiphora vacunoides (Testout, 1948)
- Imbrasia epimethea (Drury, 1772)
- Ludia obscura Aurivillius, 1893
- Micragone rougeriei Bouyer, 2008
- Orthogonioptilum falcatissimum Rougeot, 1971
- Pseudobunaea irius (Fabricius, 1793)

== Sphingidae ==
- Falcatula cymatodes (Rothschild & Jordan, 1912)
- Hippotion aporodes Rothschild & Jordan, 1912
- Lophostethus dumolinii (Angas, 1849)
- Lycosphingia hamatus (Dewitz, 1879)
- Neopolyptychus ancylus (Rothschild & Jordan, 1916)
- Neopolyptychus consimilis (Rothschild & Jordan, 1903)
- Neopolyptychus spurrelli (Rothschild & Jordan, 1912)
- Nephele bipartita Butler, 1878
- Pantophaea jordani (Joicey & Talbot, 1916)
- Phylloxiphia bicolor (Rothschild, 1894)
- Platysphinx stigmatica (Mabille, 1878)
- Platysphinx vicaria Jordan, 1920
- Poliana buchholzi (Plötz, 1880)
- Polyptychus andosa Walker, 1856
- Polyptychus carteri (Butler, 1882)
- Polyptychus orthographus Rothschild & Jordan, 1903
- Polyptychus paupercula (Holland, 1889)
- Pseudenyo benitensis Holland, 1889
- Rhadinopasa hornimani (Druce, 1880)
- Sphingonaepiopsis nana (Walker, 1856)
- Temnora atrofasciata Holland, 1889
- Temnora curtula Rothschild & Jordan, 1908
- Temnora radiata (Karsch, 1892)
- Temnora sardanus (Walker, 1856)

== Thyrididae ==
- Dysodia magnifica Whalley, 1968
- Dysodia vitrina (Boisduval, 1829)

== Tineidae ==
- Acridotarsa melipecta (Meyrick, 1915)
- Cimitra fetialis (Meyrick, 1917)
- Monopis megalodelta Meyrick, 1908
- Pitharcha chalinaea Meyrick, 1908
- Silosca licziae Gozmány, 1967
- Syncalipsis typhodes (Meyrick, 1917)

== Tortricidae ==
- Eccopsis wahlbergiana Zeller, 1852
- Thaumatotibia leucotreta (Meyrick, 1913)

== Zygaenidae ==
- Chalconycles albipalpis Hampson, 1920
