= Spidia miserrima =

Scientific classification
- Domain: Eukaryota
- Kingdom: Animalia
- Phylum: Arthropoda
- Class: Insecta
- Order: Lepidoptera
- Family: Drepanidae
- Genus: Spidia
- Species: S. miserrima

Binomial name
- Spidia miserrima (Holland, 1893)

Synonyms
- Thymistida miserrima Holland, 1893

Species of hook-tip moth

Spidia miserrima is a moth in the family Drepanidae. It was described by William Jacob Holland in 1893. It is found in Gabon.

The length of the forewings is about 25 mm. Adults are similar to Spidia excentrica and Spidia planola.
