= Spidia subviridis =

Scientific classification
- Domain: Eukaryota
- Kingdom: Animalia
- Phylum: Arthropoda
- Class: Insecta
- Order: Lepidoptera
- Family: Drepanidae
- Genus: Spidia
- Species: S. subviridis

Binomial name
- Spidia subviridis (Warren, 1899)

Synonyms
- Phalacrothyris subviridis Warren, 1899

Species of hook-tip moth

Spidia subviridis is a moth in the family Drepanidae. It was described by Warren in 1899. It is found in Cameroon, the Democratic Republic of Congo, Ivory Coast, Nigeria and Sierra Leone.

The length of the forewings is 11-14.5 mm for males and 15.5-16.5 mm for females. Adults are similar to Spidia planola and Spidia excentrica in coloration and colour-pattern.
