= Pygospila costiflexalis =

Scientific classification
- Kingdom: Animalia
- Phylum: Arthropoda
- Class: Insecta
- Order: Lepidoptera
- Family: Crambidae
- Genus: Pygospila
- Species: P. costiflexalis

Binomial name
- Pygospila costiflexalis Guenée, 1854

Species of moth

Pygospila costiflexalis is a species of moth of the family Crambidae. The species was described by Achille Guenée in 1854. It is found in south-east Asia, including India, Sri Lanka and Indonesia.

== Description ==
It differs from Pygospila tyres in being cupreous brown with a faint purple tinge; the neck is fulvous; the thoracic stripes are obscure and brownish, the abdominal spots small. Forewing with the sub-basal markings obsolescent; the three submarginal spots absent, and the spots below vein 2 minute. Hindwing with the three submarginal spots and the spot below vein 2 obsolescent.

The wingspan is about 42 mm.
