= Pseudonoorda faroensis =

Scientific classification
- Domain: Eukaryota
- Kingdom: Animalia
- Phylum: Arthropoda
- Class: Insecta
- Order: Lepidoptera
- Family: Crambidae
- Genus: Pseudonoorda
- Species: P. faroensis

Binomial name
- Pseudonoorda faroensis Maes, 2012

Species of moth

Pseudonoorda faroensis is a moth in the family Crambidae. It was described by Koen V. N. Maes in 2012. It is found in Cameroon.
