= Pseudocatharylla auricinctalis =

Scientific classification
- Kingdom: Animalia
- Phylum: Arthropoda
- Clade: Pancrustacea
- Class: Insecta
- Order: Lepidoptera
- Family: Crambidae
- Subfamily: Crambinae
- Tribe: Calamotrophini
- Genus: Pseudocatharylla
- Species: P. auricinctalis

Binomial name
- Pseudocatharylla auricinctalis (Walker, 1863)

Synonyms
- Urola auricinctalis Walker, 1863

Species of moth

Pseudocatharylla auricinctalis is a moth in the family Crambidae. It was described by Francis Walker in 1863. It is found in South Africa.
