= Pseudocatharylla latiola =

Scientific classification
- Kingdom: Animalia
- Phylum: Arthropoda
- Clade: Pancrustacea
- Class: Insecta
- Order: Lepidoptera
- Family: Crambidae
- Subfamily: Crambinae
- Tribe: Calamotrophini
- Genus: Pseudocatharylla
- Species: P. latiola

Binomial name
- Pseudocatharylla latiola Chen, Song & Yuan, 2002

Species of moth

Pseudocatharylla latiola is a moth in the family Crambidae. It was described by Tie-Mei Chen, Shi-Mei Song and De-Cheng Yuan in 2002. It is found in Heilongjiang, China.
