= Pseudonoorda photina =

Scientific classification
- Domain: Eukaryota
- Kingdom: Animalia
- Phylum: Arthropoda
- Class: Insecta
- Order: Lepidoptera
- Family: Crambidae
- Genus: Pseudonoorda
- Species: P. photina

Binomial name
- Pseudonoorda photina (Tams, 1935)

Synonyms
- Clupeosoma photina Tams, 1935

Species of moth

Pseudonoorda photina is a moth in the family Crambidae. It was described by Willie Horace Thomas Tams in 1935. It is found on Samoa.
