= Pygospila minoralis =

Scientific classification
- Kingdom: Animalia
- Phylum: Arthropoda
- Class: Insecta
- Order: Lepidoptera
- Family: Crambidae
- Genus: Pygospila
- Species: P. minoralis

Binomial name
- Pygospila minoralis Caradja in Caradja & Meyrick, 1937

Species of moth

Pygospila minoralis is a moth in the family Crambidae. It was described by Aristide Caradja in 1937. It is found in Yunnan, China.
