= Pygospila macrogastra =

Scientific classification
- Kingdom: Animalia
- Phylum: Arthropoda
- Class: Insecta
- Order: Lepidoptera
- Family: Crambidae
- Genus: Pygospila
- Species: P. macrogastra

Binomial name
- Pygospila macrogastra Meyrick, 1936

Species of moth

Pygospila macrogastra is a moth in the family Crambidae. It was described by Edward Meyrick in 1936. It is found in the Democratic Republic of the Congo.
