= Spidia =

Scientific classification
- Domain: Eukaryota
- Kingdom: Animalia
- Phylum: Arthropoda
- Class: Insecta
- Order: Lepidoptera
- Family: Drepanidae
- Subfamily: Drepaninae
- Genus: Spidia; Butler, 1878

Synonyms
- Hemictenarcha Warren, 1898; Phalacrothyris Warren, 1899

Moth genus in family Drepanidae

Spidia is a genus of moths belonging to the subfamily Drepaninae.

== Species ==
- Spidia excentrica Strand, 1912
- Spidia fenestrata Butler, 1878
- Spidia goniata Watson, 1957
- Spidia inangulata Watson, 1965
- Spidia miserrima (Holland, 1893)
- Spidia planola Watson, 1965
- Spidia rufinota Watson, 1965
- Spidia smithi (Warren, 1902)
- Spidia subviridis (Warren, 1899)
