= Pseudonoorda hemileuca =

Scientific classification
- Domain: Eukaryota
- Kingdom: Animalia
- Phylum: Arthropoda
- Class: Insecta
- Order: Lepidoptera
- Family: Crambidae
- Genus: Pseudonoorda
- Species: P. hemileuca

Binomial name
- Pseudonoorda hemileuca (Turner, 1933)

Synonyms
- Noorda hemileuca Turner, 1933

Species of moth

Pseudonoorda hemileuca is a moth in the family Crambidae. It was described by Turner in 1933. It lives in Australia, where it has been recorded from New South Wales and Queensland.
