= Pseudocatharylla infixellus =

Scientific classification
- Kingdom: Animalia
- Phylum: Arthropoda
- Clade: Pancrustacea
- Class: Insecta
- Order: Lepidoptera
- Family: Crambidae
- Subfamily: Crambinae
- Tribe: Calamotrophini
- Genus: Pseudocatharylla
- Species: P. infixellus

Binomial name
- Pseudocatharylla infixellus (Walker, 1863)

Synonyms
- Pseudocatharylla infixella (Walker, 1863); Crambus infixellus Walker, 1863; Crambus anpingicola Strand, 1918; Crambus anpingicola ab. aberrantellus Strand, 1918; Patissa impurella Wileman & South, 1918

Species of moth

Pseudocatharylla infixellus is a moth in the family Crambidae. It was described by Francis Walker in 1863. It is found in China (Shandong, Jiangsu, Guangdong), Japan and Taiwan.
