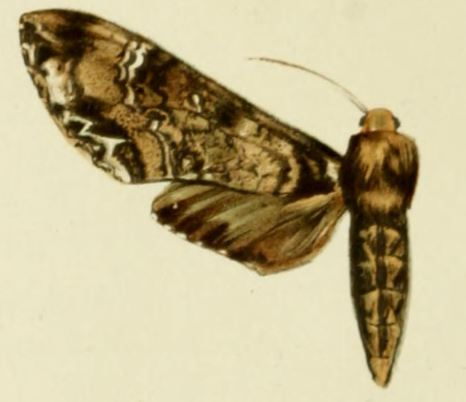

Scientific classification
- Domain: Eukaryota
- Kingdom: Animalia
- Phylum: Arthropoda
- Class: Insecta
- Order: Lepidoptera
- Family: Sphingidae
- Genus: Poliana
- Species: P. wintgensi

Binomial name
- Poliana wintgensi (Strand, 1910)

Synonyms
- Taboribia wintgensi Strand, 1910; Poliana marmorata Fawcett, 1915

= Poliana wintgensi =

Species of moth

Poliana wintgensi is a moth of the family Sphingidae. It is known from savanna and dry bush from eastern Kenya and Tanzania to Zimbabwe and Mozambique.

The length of the forewings is 34–40 mm.
