= Pseudocatharylla simplex =

Scientific classification
- Kingdom: Animalia
- Phylum: Arthropoda
- Clade: Pancrustacea
- Class: Insecta
- Order: Lepidoptera
- Family: Crambidae
- Subfamily: Crambinae
- Tribe: Calamotrophini
- Genus: Pseudocatharylla
- Species: P. simplex

Binomial name
- Pseudocatharylla simplex (Zeller, 1877)

Synonyms
- Argyria simplex Zeller, 1877; Crambus immaturellus Christoph, 1881

Species of moth

Pseudocatharylla simplex is a moth in the family Crambidae. It was described by Philipp Christoph Zeller in 1877. It is found in China (Tibet, Chekiang, Tschunking) Japan and the Russian Far East (Ussuri, Amur).
