= Pygospila cuprealis =

Scientific classification
- Kingdom: Animalia
- Phylum: Arthropoda
- Clade: Pancrustacea
- Class: Insecta
- Order: Lepidoptera
- Family: Crambidae
- Genus: Pygospila
- Species: P. cuprealis

Binomial name
- Pygospila cuprealis C. Swinhoe, 1892

Synonyms
- Pygospila evanidalis Snellen, 1896

Species of moth

Pygospila cuprealis is a moth in the family Crambidae. It was described by Charles Swinhoe in 1892. It is found in Meghalaya, India and in Myanmar.

The wingspan is about 42 mm. Adults are cupreous black, the forewings with a white spot near the base, two before the middle and four or five discal spots, as well as two subapical near the costa. All spots are semitransparent and arranged in transverse rows. The hindwings have an indistinct similar spot in the upper centre and another in the upper disc beyond. There are some small indistinct spots in a submarginal row. Both wings have a pale marginal line.
