= Pseudocatharylla chalcipterus =

Scientific classification
- Kingdom: Animalia
- Phylum: Arthropoda
- Clade: Pancrustacea
- Class: Insecta
- Order: Lepidoptera
- Family: Crambidae
- Subfamily: Crambinae
- Tribe: Calamotrophini
- Genus: Pseudocatharylla
- Species: P. chalcipterus

Binomial name
- Pseudocatharylla chalcipterus (Hampson, 1896)

Synonyms
- Crambus chalcipterus Hampson, 1896

Species of moth

Pseudocatharylla chalcipterus is a moth in the family Crambidae. It was described by George Hampson in 1896. It is found in Assam, India.
