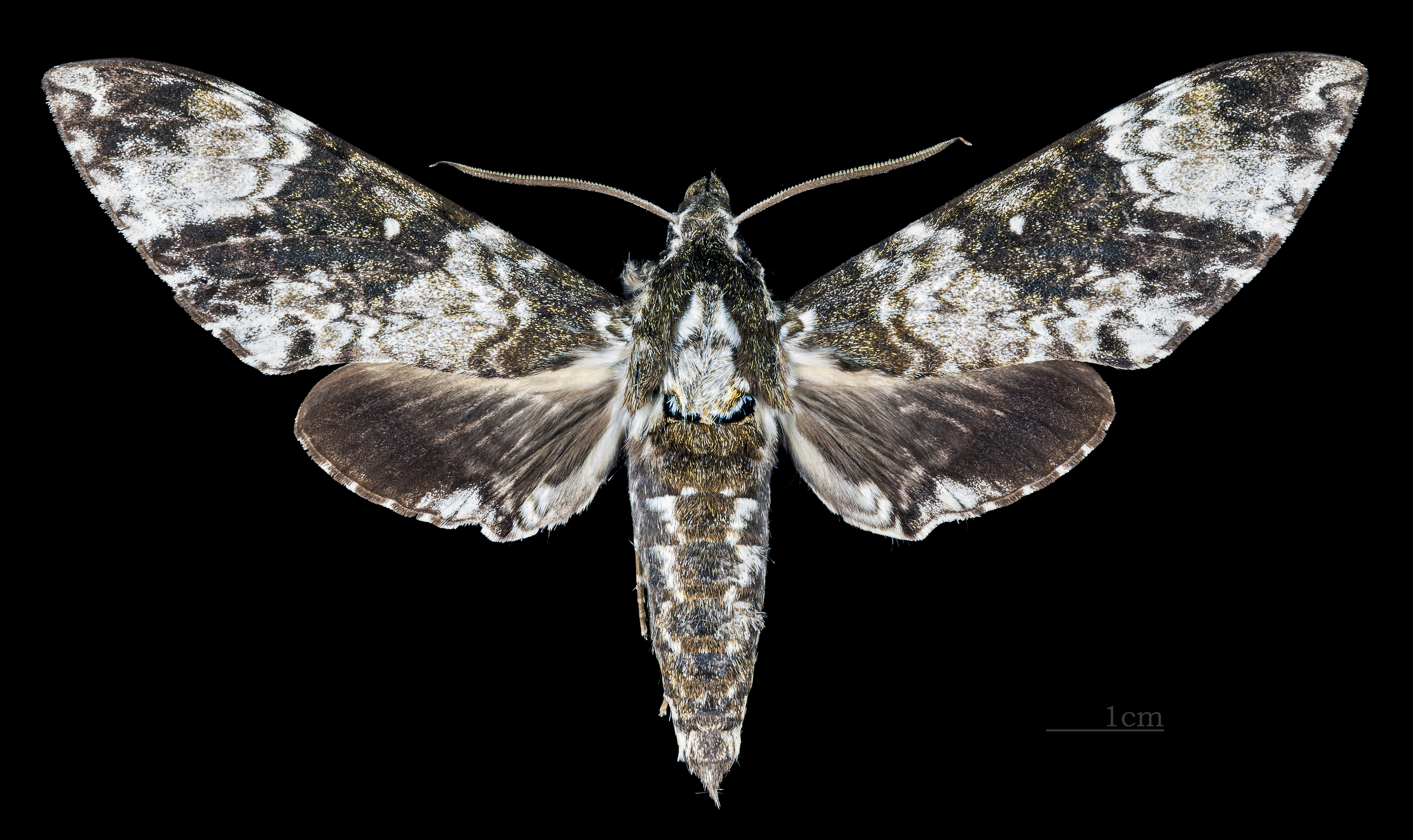
- Poliana leucomelas male dorsal
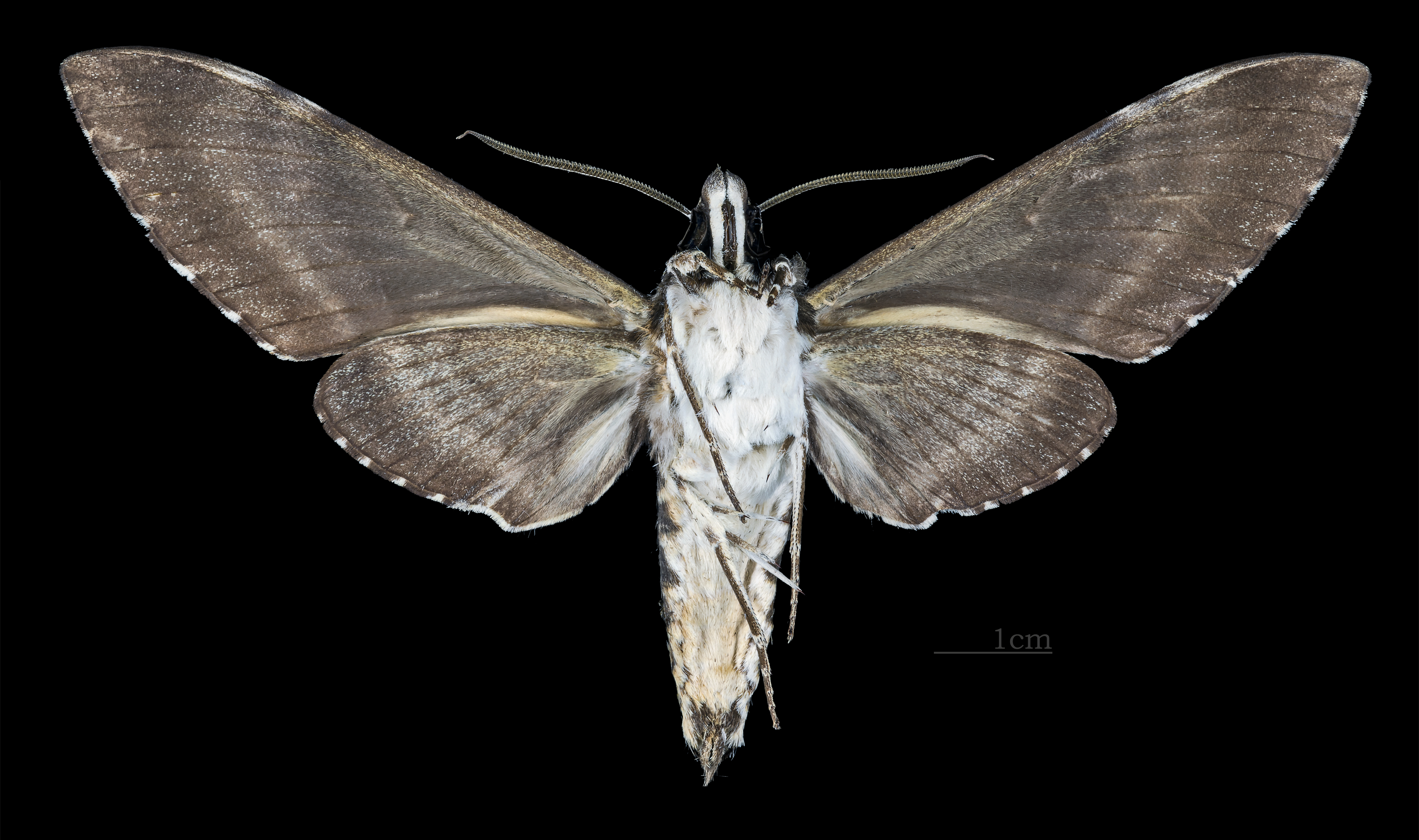
- Poliana leucomelas male ventral

Scientific classification
- Domain: Eukaryota
- Kingdom: Animalia
- Phylum: Arthropoda
- Class: Insecta
- Order: Lepidoptera
- Family: Sphingidae
- Genus: Poliana
- Species: P. leucomelas

Binomial name
- Poliana leucomelas Rothschild & Jordan, 1915

= Poliana leucomelas =

Species of moth

Poliana leucomelas is a moth of the family Sphingidae. It is known from Thailand.

== Description ==
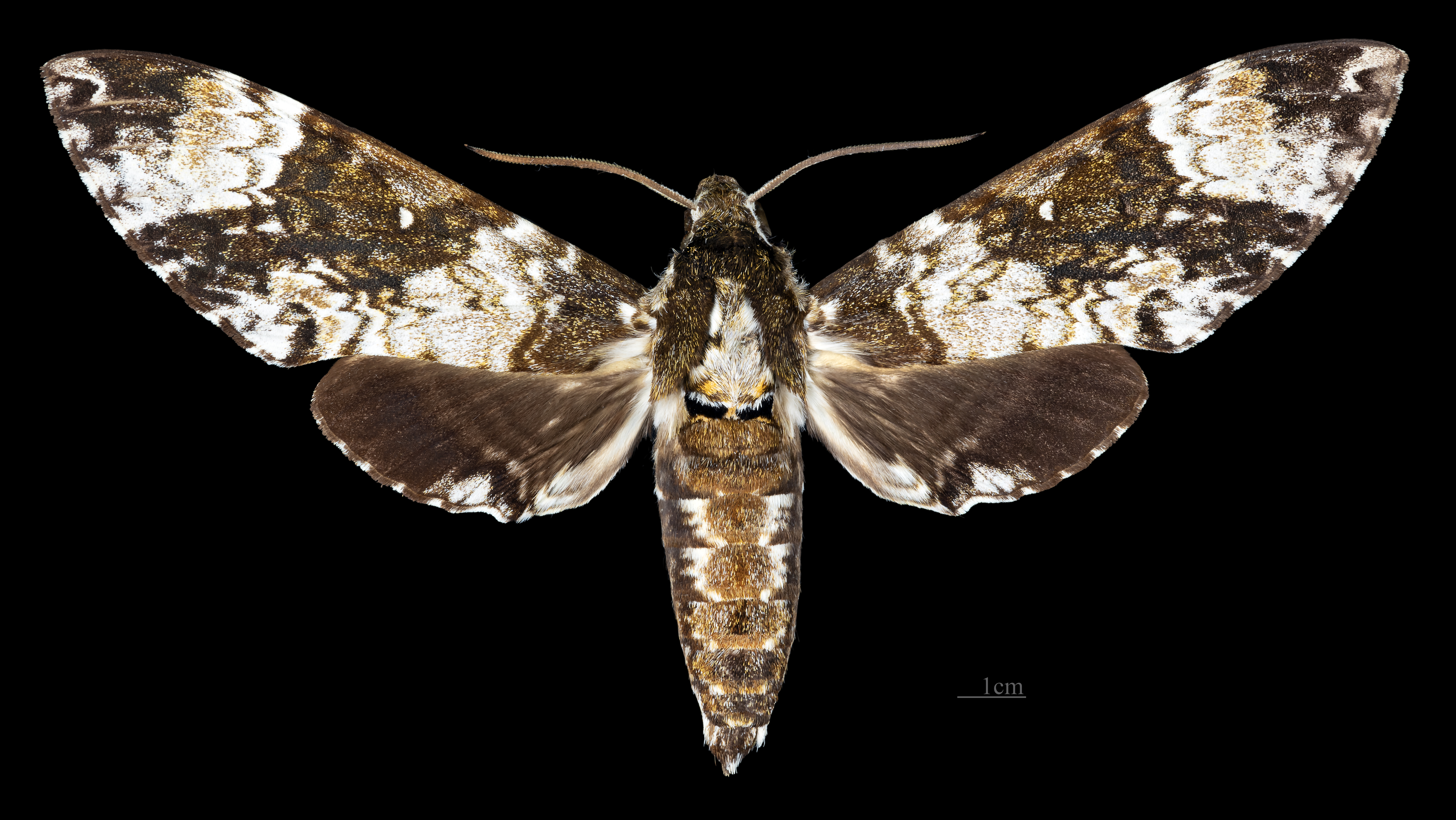
Poliana leucomelas ♀

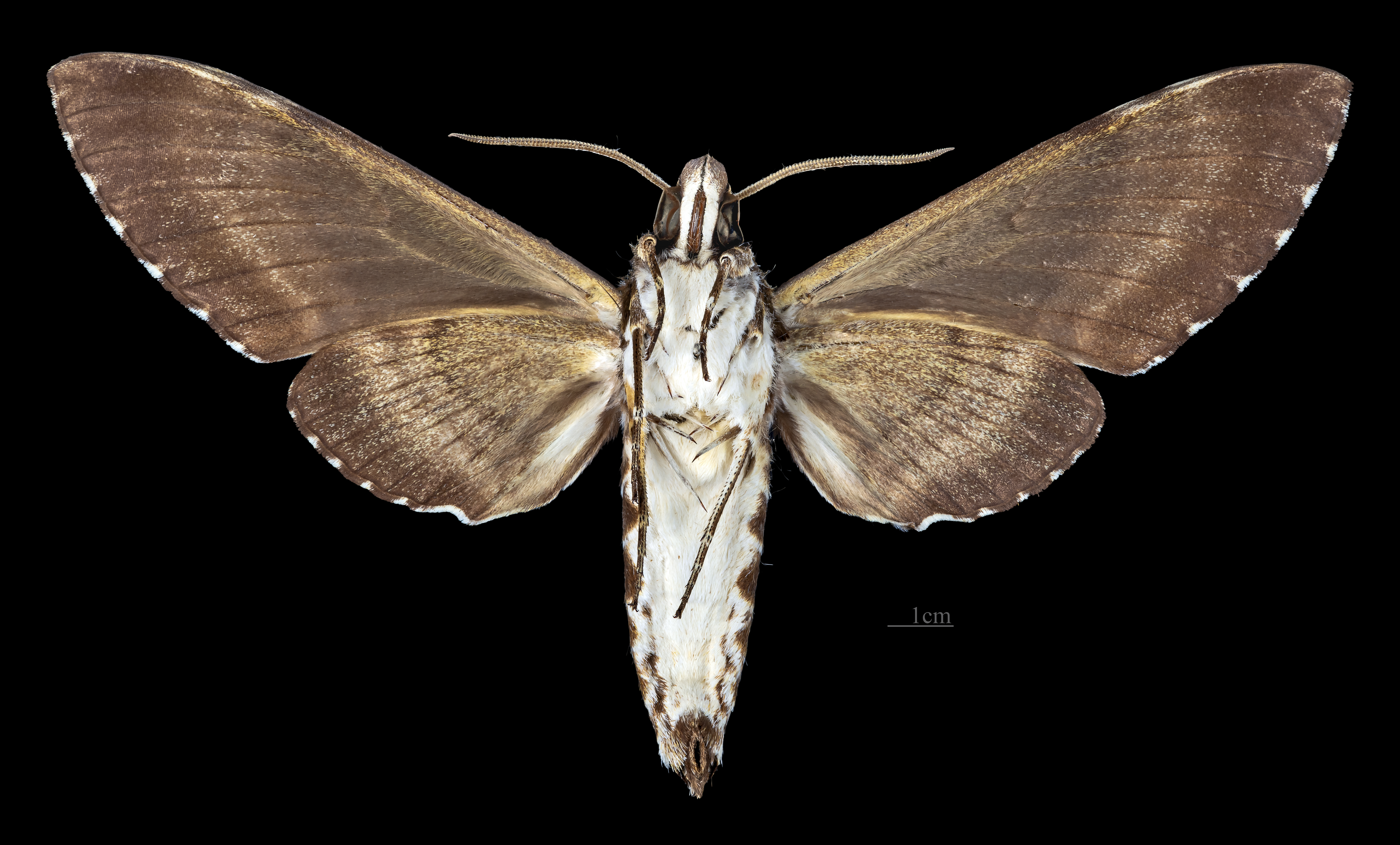
Poliana leucomelas ♀ △
