= Pygospila hyalotypa =

Scientific classification
- Kingdom: Animalia
- Phylum: Arthropoda
- Class: Insecta
- Order: Lepidoptera
- Family: Crambidae
- Genus: Pygospila
- Species: P. hyalotypa

Binomial name
- Pygospila hyalotypa Turner, 1908

Species of moth

Pygospila hyalotypa is a moth in the family Crambidae. It was described by Turner in 1908. It is found in Papua New Guinea and Australia, where it has been recorded from Queensland.

The wingspan is about 46 mm. The forewings fuscous-grey, with a purple lustre. The spots are translucent and free from scales. There is a dot below the cell near the base, and another in the cell towards the base, as well as a quadrangular spot in cell, and another oval spot on the dorsal side of it below the cell. A quadrangular spot is found beneath the costa, it is bisected by vein 6. There is a smaller spot obliquely below this, bisected by vein 4. The hindwings have a sinuate termen. The colour is as the forewings, but there is one translucent spot only. It is located towards the base on dorsal side of the cell and is elongate-ovoid and narrower towards base.
