= Nanna ceratopygia =

Scientific classification
- Domain: Eukaryota
- Kingdom: Animalia
- Phylum: Arthropoda
- Class: Insecta
- Order: Lepidoptera
- Superfamily: Noctuoidea
- Family: Erebidae
- Subfamily: Arctiinae
- Genus: Nanna
- Species: N. ceratopygia

Binomial name
- Nanna ceratopygia Birket-Smith, 1965

Species of moth

Nanna ceratopygia is a moth of the subfamily Arctiinae. It was described by Sven Jorgen R. Birket-Smith in 1965. It is found in Cameroon and Nigeria.
