= Pseudonoorda noordimimalis =

Scientific classification
- Kingdom: Animalia
- Phylum: Arthropoda
- Class: Insecta
- Order: Lepidoptera
- Family: Crambidae
- Genus: Pseudonoorda
- Species: P. noordimimalis

Binomial name
- Pseudonoorda noordimimalis (Hampson, 1917)

Synonyms
- Clupeosoma noordimimalis Hampson, 1917

Species of moth

Pseudonoorda noordimimalis is a moth in the family Crambidae. It was described by George Hampson in 1917. It is found in Ghana.
