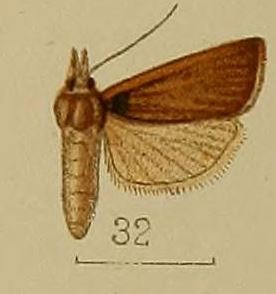

Scientific classification
- Kingdom: Animalia
- Phylum: Arthropoda
- Clade: Pancrustacea
- Class: Insecta
- Order: Lepidoptera
- Family: Crambidae
- Subfamily: Crambinae
- Tribe: Calamotrophini
- Genus: Pseudocatharylla
- Species: P. albiceps

Binomial name
- Pseudocatharylla albiceps (Hampson, 1912)

Synonyms
- Crambus albiceps Hampson, 1912

= Pseudocatharylla albiceps =

Species of moth

Pseudocatharylla albiceps is a moth of the family Crambidae. It is found in Sri Lanka.
