= Nanna melanosticta =

Scientific classification
- Kingdom: Animalia
- Phylum: Arthropoda
- Clade: Pancrustacea
- Class: Insecta
- Order: Lepidoptera
- Superfamily: Noctuoidea
- Family: Erebidae
- Subfamily: Arctiinae
- Genus: Nanna
- Species: N. melanosticta

Binomial name
- Nanna melanosticta (Bethune-Baker, 1911)

Synonyms
- Ilema melanosticta Bethune-Baker, 1911

Species of moth

Nanna melanosticta is a moth of the subfamily Arctiinae. It was described by George Thomas Bethune-Baker in 1911. It is found in Angola and Ghana.
