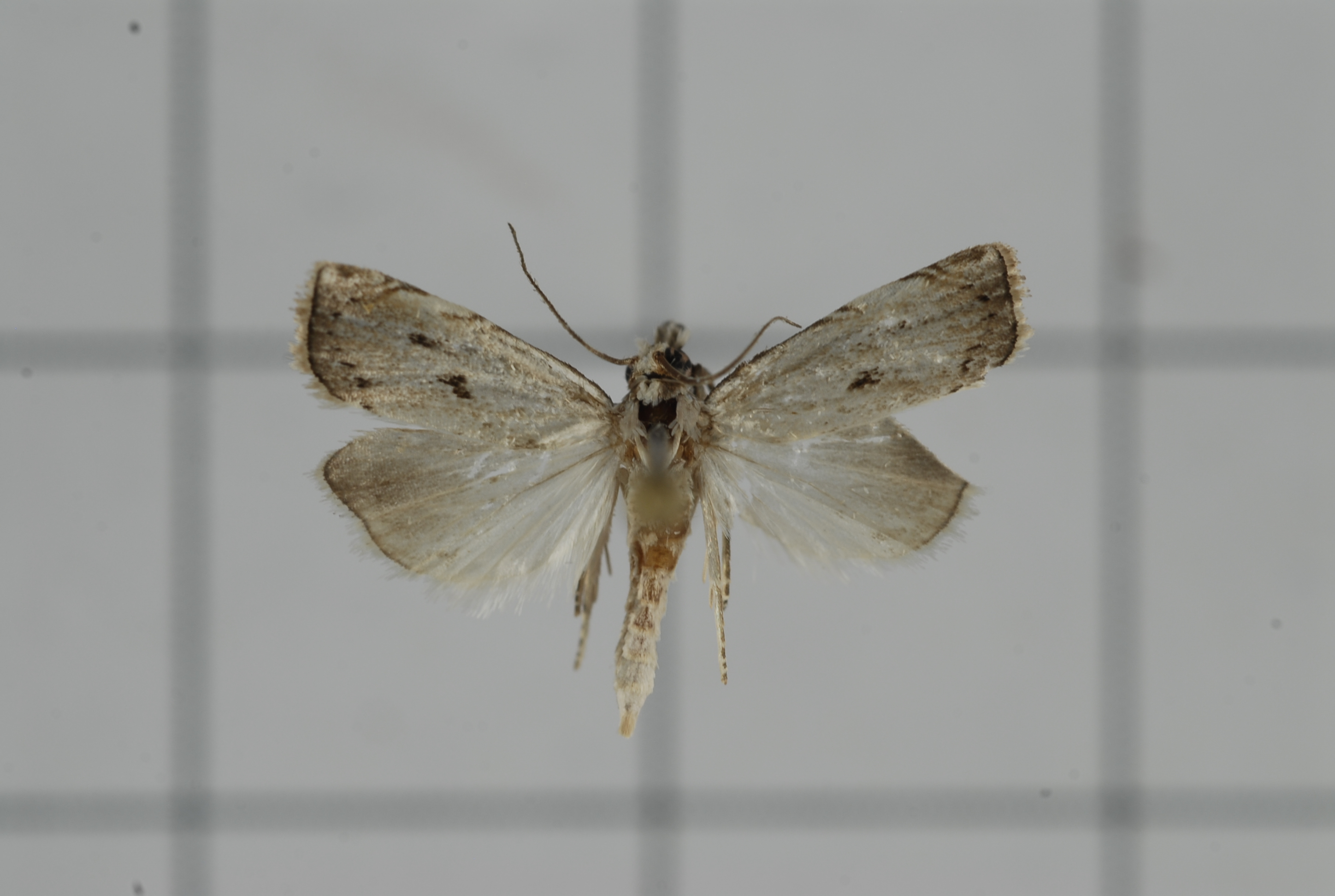

Scientific classification
- Kingdom: Animalia
- Phylum: Arthropoda
- Clade: Pancrustacea
- Class: Insecta
- Order: Lepidoptera
- Family: Crambidae
- Subfamily: Crambinae
- Tribe: Calamotrophini
- Genus: Pseudocatharylla
- Species: P. duplicellus

Binomial name
- Pseudocatharylla duplicellus (Hampson, 1896)

Synonyms
- Pseudocatharylla duplicella (Hampson, 1896); Crambus duplicellus Hampson, 1896; Crambus anpingiellus Strand, 1918; Crambus distictellus Hampson, 1919

= Pseudocatharylla duplicellus =

Species of moth

Pseudocatharylla duplicellus is a moth in the family Crambidae. It was described by George Hampson in 1896. It is found in Vietnam, Taiwan, Japan, China (Jiangsu, Zhejiang, Tongling), Malaysia and Sri Lanka.
