= Poliana albescens =

Scientific classification
- Kingdom: Animalia
- Phylum: Arthropoda
- Class: Insecta
- Order: Lepidoptera
- Family: Sphingidae
- Genus: Poliana
- Species: P. albescens

Binomial name
- Poliana albescens Inoue, 1996

Species of moth

Poliana albescens is a moth of the family Sphingidae. It is known from the Philippines.
