= Pseudonoorda brunneifusalis =

Scientific classification
- Kingdom: Animalia
- Phylum: Arthropoda
- Class: Insecta
- Order: Lepidoptera
- Family: Crambidae
- Genus: Pseudonoorda
- Species: P. brunneifusalis

Binomial name
- Pseudonoorda brunneifusalis (Hampson, 1917)

Synonyms
- Clupeosoma brunneifusalis Hampson, 1917; Clupeosoma brunneifusalis iridescens Whalley, 1962

Species of moth

Pseudonoorda brunneifusalis is a moth in the family Crambidae. It was described by George Hampson in 1917. It is found on New Guinea.

== Subspecies ==
- Pseudonoorda brunneifusalis brunneifusalis (Papua New Guinea)
- Pseudonoorda brunneifusalis iridescens (Whalley, 1962) (Rennell Island)
