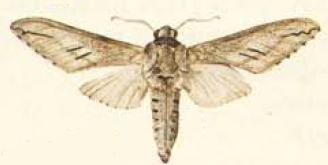
- Pantophaea favillacea

Scientific classification
- Domain: Eukaryota
- Kingdom: Animalia
- Phylum: Arthropoda
- Class: Insecta
- Order: Lepidoptera
- Family: Sphingidae
- Tribe: Sphingini
- Genus: Pantophaea; Jordan, 1946

Synonyms
- Pemba Rothschild & Jordan, 1903

= Pantophaea =

Genus of moths

Pantophaea is a genus of moths in the family Sphingidae. The genus was erected by Karl Jordan in 1946.

== Species ==
- Pantophaea favillacea (Walker 1866)
- Pantophaea jordani (Joicey & Talbot 1916)
- Pantophaea oneili (Clark 1925)
