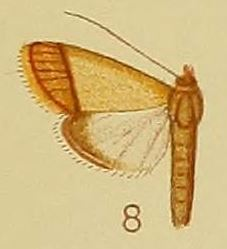

Scientific classification
- Kingdom: Animalia
- Phylum: Arthropoda
- Class: Insecta
- Order: Lepidoptera
- Family: Crambidae
- Genus: Pseudonoorda
- Species: P. rubricostalis

Binomial name
- Pseudonoorda rubricostalis (Hampson, 1910)

Synonyms
- Noorda rubricostalis Hampson, 1910

= Pseudonoorda rubricostalis =

Species of moth

Pseudonoorda rubricostalis is a moth in the family Crambidae. It was described by George Hampson in 1910. It is found in the Democratic Republic of the Congo (Kasai-Occidental, Katanga), Namibia, Zambia and Zimbabwe.
