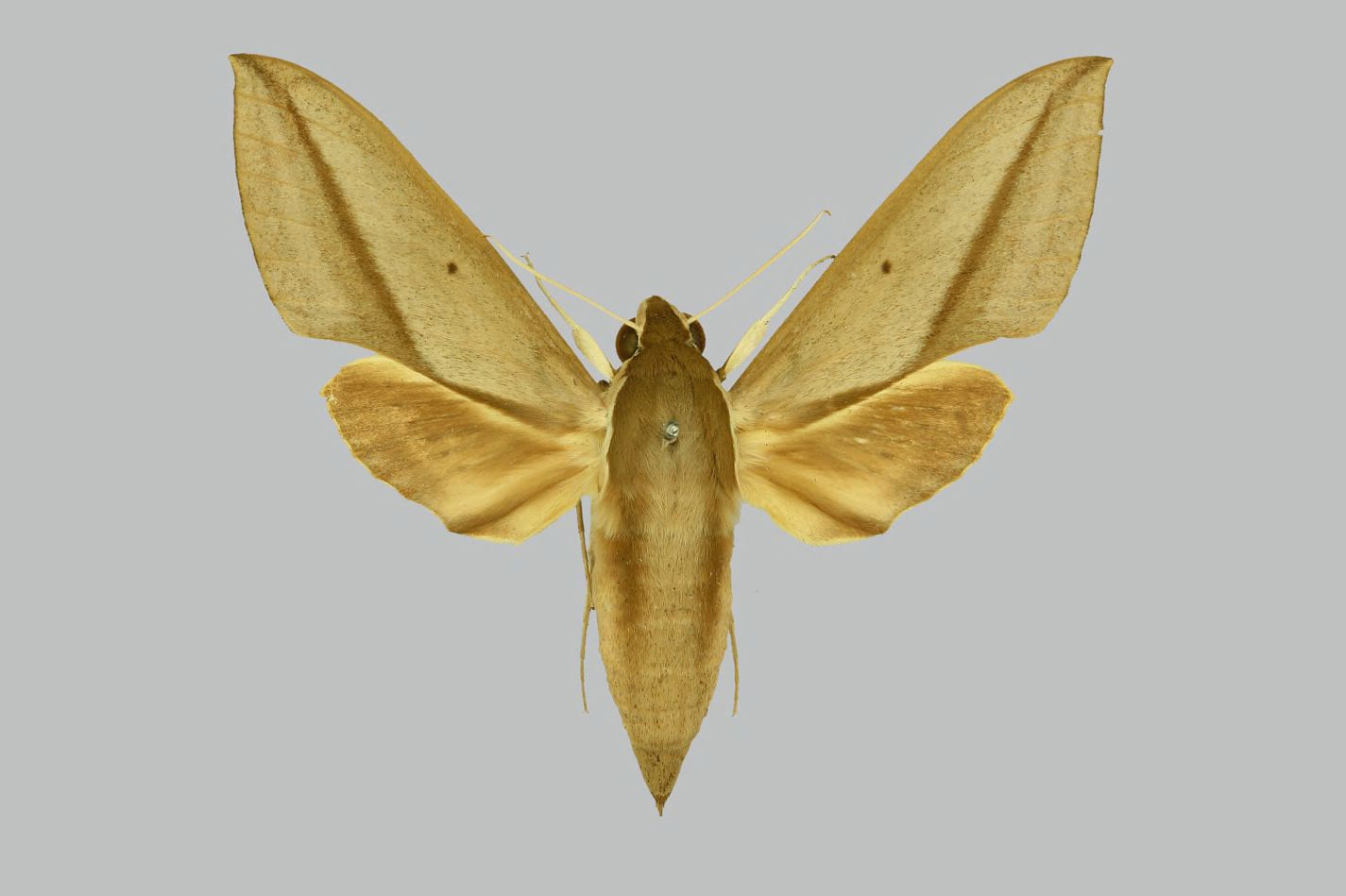
- Female Pantophaea oneili

Scientific classification
- Domain: Eukaryota
- Kingdom: Animalia
- Phylum: Arthropoda
- Class: Insecta
- Order: Lepidoptera
- Family: Sphingidae
- Genus: Pantophaea
- Species: P. oneili

Binomial name
- Pantophaea oneili (Clark, 1925)

Synonyms
- Pemba oneili Clark, 1925

= Pantophaea oneili =

Species of moth

Pantophaea oneili is a moth of the family Sphingidae. It is known from Zimbabwe.
