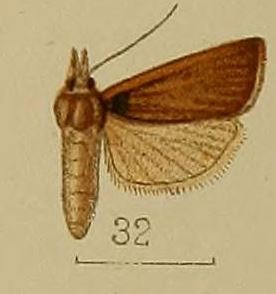
- Pseudocatharylla albiceps

Scientific classification
- Kingdom: Animalia
- Phylum: Arthropoda
- Clade: Pancrustacea
- Class: Insecta
- Order: Lepidoptera
- Family: Crambidae
- Subfamily: Crambinae
- Tribe: Calamotrophini
- Genus: Pseudocatharylla; Bleszynski, 1961

= Pseudocatharylla =

Genus of moths

Pseudocatharylla is a genus of moths of the family Crambidae.

== Species ==
- Pseudocatharylla albiceps (Hampson, 1912)
- Pseudocatharylla allecto Bassi, 1999
- Pseudocatharylla angolica Bleszynski, 1964
- Pseudocatharylla argenticilia (Hampson, 1919)
- Pseudocatharylla artemida Bleszynski, 1964
- Pseudocatharylla asteria Bassi, 1999
- Pseudocatharylla auricinctalis (Walker, 1863)
- Pseudocatharylla aurifimbriellus (Hampson, 1896)
- Pseudocatharylla berberichi Bleszynski, 1970
- Pseudocatharylla calypso Bassi, 1999
- Pseudocatharylla chalcipterus (Hampson, 1896)
- Pseudocatharylla chionopepla (Hampson, 1919)
- Pseudocatharylla duplicellus (Hampson, 1896)
- Pseudocatharylla faduguella Schouten, 1994
- Pseudocatharylla flavicostella Bleszynski, 1964
- Pseudocatharylla flavipedellus (Zeller, 1852)
- Pseudocatharylla gioconda Bleszynski, 1964
- Pseudocatharylla inclaralis (Walker, 1863)
- Pseudocatharylla infixellus (Walker, 1863)
- Pseudocatharylla innotalis (Hampson, 1919)
- Pseudocatharylla kibwezica Bleszynski, 1964
- Pseudocatharylla lagosella Bleszynski, 1964
- Pseudocatharylla latiola Chen, Song & Yuan, 2002
- Pseudocatharylla mariposella Bleszynski, 1964
- Pseudocatharylla megera Bassi, 1999
- Pseudocatharylla meus (Strand, 1918)
- Pseudocatharylla mikengella Bleszynski, 1964
- Pseudocatharylla nemesis Bleszynski, 1964
- Pseudocatharylla nigrociliella (Zeller, 1863)
- Pseudocatharylla peralbellus (Hampson, 1919)
- Pseudocatharylla photoleuca (Lower, 1903)
- Pseudocatharylla polyxena Bleszynski, 1964
- Pseudocatharylla ruwenzorella Bleszynski, 1964
- Pseudocatharylla shafferi Bassi, 1999
- Pseudocatharylla simplex (Zeller, 1877)
- Pseudocatharylla subgioconda Bleszynski, 1964
- Pseudocatharylla submikengella Bleszynski, 1964
- Pseudocatharylla tisiphone Bassi, 1999
- Pseudocatharylla ugandica Bleszynski, 1964
- Pseudocatharylla xymena Bleszynski, 1964
- Pseudocatharylla zernyi Bleszynski, 1964
