= Spidia goniata =

Scientific classification
- Domain: Eukaryota
- Kingdom: Animalia
- Phylum: Arthropoda
- Class: Insecta
- Order: Lepidoptera
- Family: Drepanidae
- Genus: Spidia
- Species: S. goniata

Binomial name
- Spidia goniata Watson, 1957

Species of hook-tip moth

Spidia goniata is a moth in the family Drepanidae. It was described by Watson in 1957. It is found in Uganda.
