= Pseudocatharylla faduguella =

Scientific classification
- Kingdom: Animalia
- Phylum: Arthropoda
- Clade: Pancrustacea
- Class: Insecta
- Order: Lepidoptera
- Family: Crambidae
- Subfamily: Crambinae
- Tribe: Calamotrophini
- Genus: Pseudocatharylla
- Species: P. faduguella

Binomial name
- Pseudocatharylla faduguella Schouten, 1994

Species of moth

Pseudocatharylla faduguella is a moth in the family Crambidae, described by Rob T.A. Schouten in 1994. It is found in Sierra Leone.
