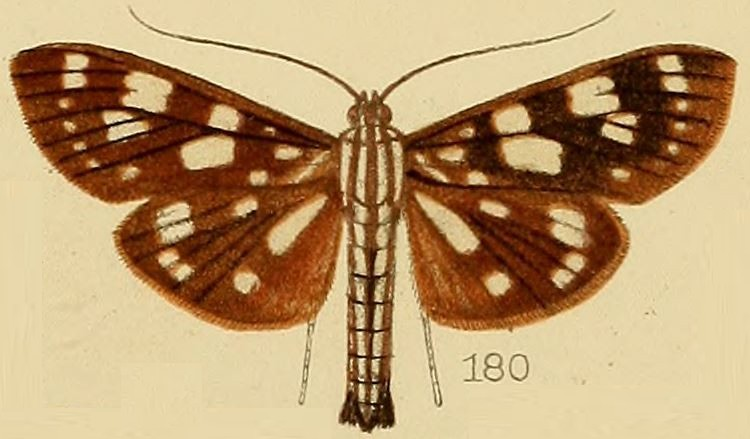

Scientific classification
- Kingdom: Animalia
- Phylum: Arthropoda
- Class: Insecta
- Order: Lepidoptera
- Family: Crambidae
- Genus: Pygospila
- Species: P. imperialis

Binomial name
- Pygospila imperialis Kenrick, 1907

= Pygospila imperialis =

Species of moth

Pygospila imperialis is a species of moth of the family Crambidae. It is found in Papua New Guinea.

It has a wingspan of 36mm.
