= Nanna kamerunica =

Scientific classification
- Kingdom: Animalia
- Phylum: Arthropoda
- Class: Insecta
- Order: Lepidoptera
- Superfamily: Noctuoidea
- Family: Erebidae
- Subfamily: Arctiinae
- Genus: Nanna
- Species: N. kamerunica

Binomial name
- Nanna kamerunica Kühne, 2007

Species of moth

Nanna kamerunica is a moth of the subfamily Arctiinae. It was described by Lars Kühne in 2007. It is found in Cameroon.
