= Nanna eningae =

Scientific classification
- Domain: Eukaryota
- Kingdom: Animalia
- Phylum: Arthropoda
- Class: Insecta
- Order: Lepidoptera
- Superfamily: Noctuoidea
- Family: Erebidae
- Subfamily: Arctiinae
- Genus: Nanna
- Species: N. eningae

Binomial name
- Nanna eningae (Plötz, 1880)

Synonyms
- Gnophria eningae Plötz, 1880; Nanna montana Birket-Smith, 1965; Eilema eningae var. pia Strand, 1912

Species of moth

Nanna eningae is a moth of the subfamily Arctiinae. It was described by Plötz in 1880. It is found in Cameroon, the Republic of Congo, Equatorial Guinea, Ghana, Kenya, Nigeria, Somalia, Togo and Uganda.
