= Pseudonoorda distigmalis =

Scientific classification
- Kingdom: Animalia
- Phylum: Arthropoda
- Class: Insecta
- Order: Lepidoptera
- Family: Crambidae
- Genus: Pseudonoorda
- Species: P. distigmalis

Binomial name
- Pseudonoorda distigmalis (Hampson, 1913)

Synonyms
- Noorda distigmalis Hampson, 1913

Species of moth

Pseudonoorda distigmalis is a moth in the family Crambidae. It was described by George Hampson in 1913. It is found in the Democratic Republic of the Congo (Kasai-Occidental, Équateur), Cameroon and Nigeria.
