= Nanna (moth) =

Scientific classification
- Domain: Eukaryota
- Kingdom: Animalia
- Phylum: Arthropoda
- Class: Insecta
- Order: Lepidoptera
- Superfamily: Noctuoidea
- Family: Erebidae
- Subfamily: Arctiinae
- Tribe: Lithosiini
- Genus: Nanna; Birket-Smith, 1965

Genus of moths

Nanna is a genus of moths in the subfamily Arctiinae. The genus was erected by Sven Jorgen R. Birket-Smith in 1965.

== Species ==
- Nanna broetheri Kühne, 2014 Rwanda
- Nanna ceratopygia Birket-Smith, 1965 Cameroon, Nigeria, Gabon
- Nanna collinsii Kühne, 2007 Congo
- Nanna colonoides (Kiriakoff, 1963) Congo
- Nanna diplisticta (Bethune-Baker, 1911) western Africa
- Nanna distyi Kühne, 2014 Congo
- Nanna eningae (Plötz, 1880) Cameroons
- Nanna falcata Kühne, 2014 Rwanda
- Nanna griseata Kühne, 2007 Ivory Coast
- Nanna griseoides Kühne, 2014 Cameroons
- Nanna hoppei Kühne, 2014 Congo
- Nanna kamerunica Kühne, 2007 Cameroons
- Nanna loloana (Strand, 1912) southern Cameroon
- Nanna luteolata Kühne, 2014 Nigeria
- Nanna magna Birket-Smith, 1965
- Nanna melanosticta (Bethune-Baker, 1911) Angola
- Nanna molouba Durante, Apinda-Legnouo & Romano, 2013 Gabon
- Nanna naumanni Kühne, 2005 Kenya
- Nanna pia (Strand, 1912) Cameroon
- Nanna semigrisea Durante, Apinda-Legnouo & Romano, 2013 Gabon
- Nanna tanzaniae Kühne, 2014 Tanzania
