= Spidia rufinota =

Scientific classification
- Domain: Eukaryota
- Kingdom: Animalia
- Phylum: Arthropoda
- Class: Insecta
- Order: Lepidoptera
- Family: Drepanidae
- Genus: Spidia
- Species: S. rufinota

Binomial name
- Spidia rufinota Watson, 1965

Species of hook-tip moth

Spidia rufinota is a moth in the family Drepanidae. It was described by Watson in 1965. It is found in Cameroon and the Central African Republic.
