= Pseudonoorda nitidalis =

Scientific classification
- Domain: Eukaryota
- Kingdom: Animalia
- Phylum: Arthropoda
- Class: Insecta
- Order: Lepidoptera
- Family: Crambidae
- Genus: Pseudonoorda
- Species: P. nitidalis

Binomial name
- Pseudonoorda nitidalis (Pagenstecher, 1900)

Synonyms
- Pagyda nitidalis Pagenstecher, 1900

Species of moth

Pseudonoorda nitidalis is a moth in the family Crambidae. It was described by Pagenstecher in 1900. It is found on the Bismarck Archipelago.
