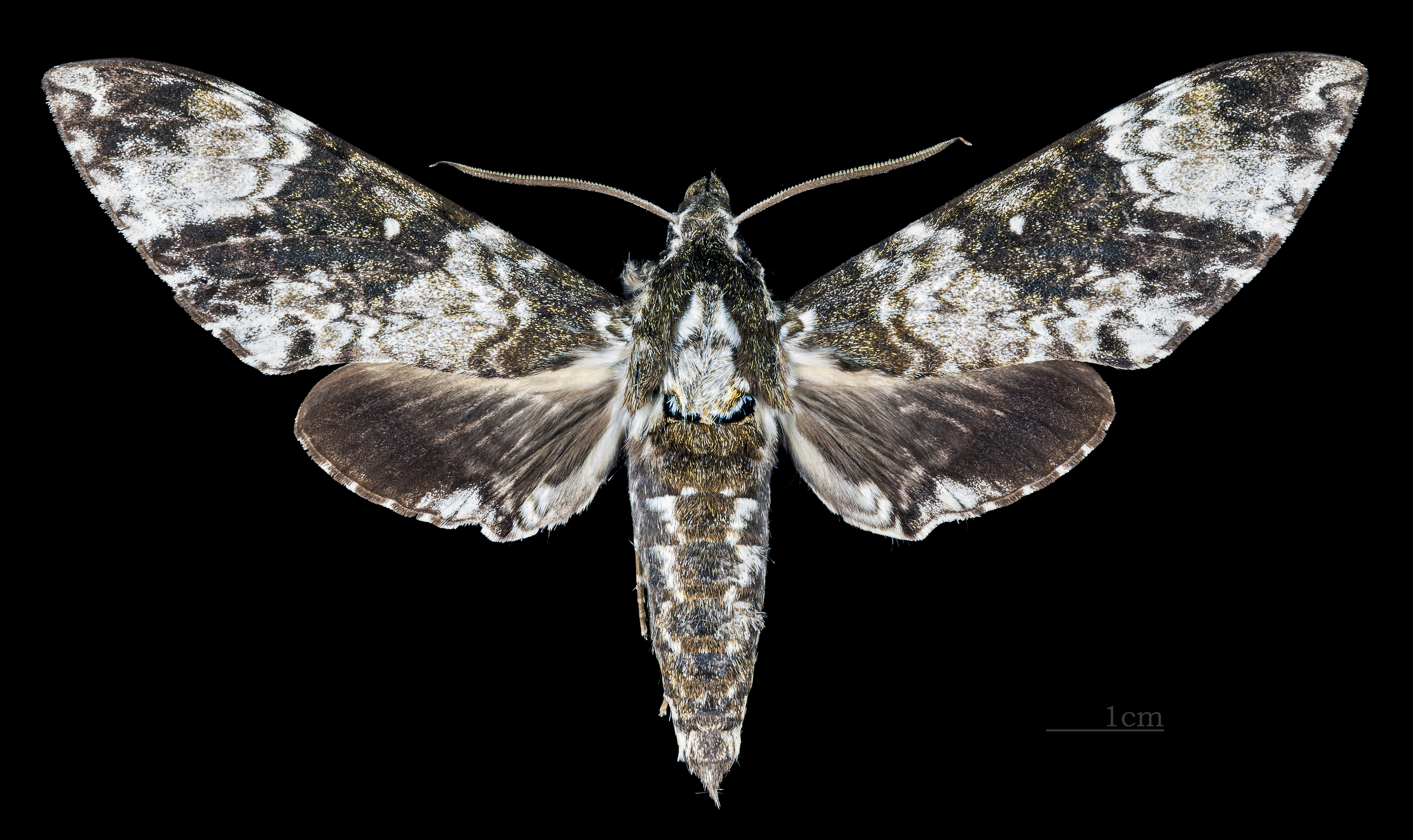
- Poliana leucomelas

Scientific classification
- Domain: Eukaryota
- Kingdom: Animalia
- Phylum: Arthropoda
- Class: Insecta
- Order: Lepidoptera
- Family: Sphingidae
- Tribe: Sphingini
- Genus: Poliana; Rothschild & Jordan, 1903

Synonyms
- Taboribia Strand, 1910

= Poliana (moth) =

Genus of moths

Poliana is a genus of moths in the family Sphingidae. The genus was erected by Walter Rothschild and Karl Jordan in 1903.

== Species ==
- Poliana albescens Inoue 1996
- Poliana buchholzi (Plotz 1880)
- Poliana leucomelas Rothschild & Jordan 1915
- Poliana micra Rothschild & Jordan 1903
- Poliana wintgensi (Strand 1910)
