= Pseudocatharylla innotalis =

Scientific classification
- Kingdom: Animalia
- Phylum: Arthropoda
- Clade: Pancrustacea
- Class: Insecta
- Order: Lepidoptera
- Family: Crambidae
- Subfamily: Crambinae
- Tribe: Calamotrophini
- Genus: Pseudocatharylla
- Species: P. innotalis

Binomial name
- Pseudocatharylla innotalis (Hampson, 1919)

Synonyms
- Culladia innotalis Hampson, 1919

Species of moth

Pseudocatharylla innotalis is a moth in the family Crambidae. It was described by George Hampson in 1919. It is found in China.
