= Pseudonoorda nigropunctalis =

Scientific classification
- Kingdom: Animalia
- Phylum: Arthropoda
- Class: Insecta
- Order: Lepidoptera
- Family: Crambidae
- Genus: Pseudonoorda
- Species: P. nigropunctalis

Binomial name
- Pseudonoorda nigropunctalis (Hampson, 1899)

Synonyms
- Noorda nigropunctalis Hampson, 1899

Species of moth

Pseudonoorda nigropunctalis is a moth in the family Crambidae. It was described by George Hampson in 1899. It is found in Malaysia.

The wingspan is about 18 mm. The forewings are yellowish white with a reddish-brown costa. The terminal area is purplish fuscous. The apical area of the hindwings is purple fuscous with a waved black line on the inner edge.
