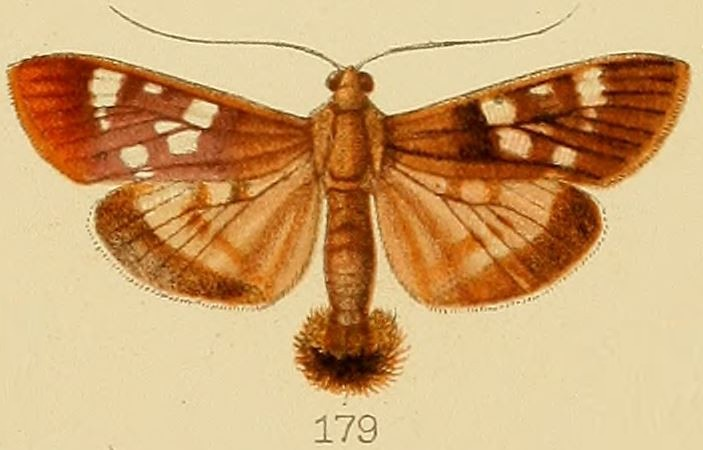

Scientific classification
- Kingdom: Animalia
- Phylum: Arthropoda
- Class: Insecta
- Order: Lepidoptera
- Family: Crambidae
- Genus: Pygospila
- Species: P. marginalis

Binomial name
- Pygospila marginalis Kenrick, 1907

= Pygospila marginalis =

Species of moth

Pygospila marginalis is a species of moth of the family Crambidae. It is found in Papua New Guinea.

It has a wingspan of 45mm.
