= Pseudocatharylla submikengella =

Scientific classification
- Kingdom: Animalia
- Phylum: Arthropoda
- Clade: Pancrustacea
- Class: Insecta
- Order: Lepidoptera
- Family: Crambidae
- Subfamily: Crambinae
- Tribe: Calamotrophini
- Genus: Pseudocatharylla
- Species: P. submikengella

Binomial name
- Pseudocatharylla submikengella Błeszyński, 1964

Synonyms
- Pseudocatharylla submikengella zairella Bassi, 1999

Species of moth

Pseudocatharylla submikengella is a moth in the family Crambidae. It was described by Stanisław Błeszyński in 1964. It is found in Angola and the Democratic Republic of the Congo.
