= Pseudocatharylla photoleuca =

Scientific classification
- Kingdom: Animalia
- Phylum: Arthropoda
- Clade: Pancrustacea
- Class: Insecta
- Order: Lepidoptera
- Family: Crambidae
- Subfamily: Crambinae
- Tribe: Calamotrophini
- Genus: Pseudocatharylla
- Species: P. photoleuca

Binomial name
- Pseudocatharylla photoleuca (Lower, 1903)

Synonyms
- Crambus photoleuca Lower, 1903

Species of moth

Pseudocatharylla photoleuca is a moth in the family Crambidae. It was described by Oswald Bertram Lower in 1903. It is found in Australia, where it has been recorded from Queensland.
