= Nanna loloana =

Scientific classification
- Kingdom: Animalia
- Phylum: Arthropoda
- Class: Insecta
- Order: Lepidoptera
- Superfamily: Noctuoidea
- Family: Erebidae
- Subfamily: Arctiinae
- Genus: Nanna
- Species: N. loloana

Binomial name
- Nanna loloana (Strand, 1912)

Synonyms
- Phryganopsis loloana Strand, 1912

Species of moth

Nanna loloana is a moth of the subfamily Arctiinae. It was described by Strand in 1912. It is found in Cameroon.
