= Spidia smithi =

Scientific classification
- Domain: Eukaryota
- Kingdom: Animalia
- Phylum: Arthropoda
- Class: Insecta
- Order: Lepidoptera
- Family: Drepanidae
- Genus: Spidia
- Species: S. smithi

Binomial name
- Spidia smithi (Warren, 1902)

Synonyms
- Phalacrothyris smithi Warren, 1902

Species of hook-tip moth

Spidia smithi is a moth in the family Drepanidae. It was described by Warren in 1902. It is found in the Democratic Republic of Congo and Uganda.
