= Pseudocatharylla meus =

Scientific classification
- Kingdom: Animalia
- Phylum: Arthropoda
- Clade: Pancrustacea
- Class: Insecta
- Order: Lepidoptera
- Family: Crambidae
- Subfamily: Crambinae
- Tribe: Calamotrophini
- Genus: Pseudocatharylla
- Species: P. meus

Binomial name
- Pseudocatharylla meus (Strand, 1918)

Synonyms
- Crambus meus Strand, 1918

Species of moth

Pseudocatharylla meus is a moth in the family Crambidae. It was described by Strand in 1918. It is found in Taiwan.
