= Pseudocatharylla asteria =

Scientific classification
- Kingdom: Animalia
- Phylum: Arthropoda
- Clade: Pancrustacea
- Class: Insecta
- Order: Lepidoptera
- Family: Crambidae
- Subfamily: Crambinae
- Tribe: Calamotrophini
- Genus: Pseudocatharylla
- Species: P. asteria

Binomial name
- Pseudocatharylla asteria Bassi, 1999

Species of moth

Pseudocatharylla asteria is a moth in the family Crambidae. It was described by Graziano Bassi in 1999. It is found in Malawi.
