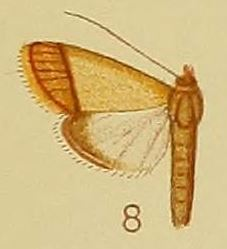
- Pseudonoorda rubricostalis

Scientific classification
- Domain: Eukaryota
- Kingdom: Animalia
- Phylum: Arthropoda
- Class: Insecta
- Order: Lepidoptera
- Family: Crambidae
- Tribe: Eurrhypini
- Genus: Pseudonoorda; Munroe, 1974

= Pseudonoorda =

Genus of moths

Pseudonoorda is a genus of moths of the family Crambidae.

== Species ==
- Pseudonoorda brunneiflava Munroe, 1974
- Pseudonoorda brunneifusalis (Hampson, 1917)
- Pseudonoorda distigmalis (Hampson, 1913)
- Pseudonoorda edulis Maes & Poligui in Maes, 2012
- Pseudonoorda faroensis Maes, 2012
- Pseudonoorda flammea Maes, 2012
- Pseudonoorda hemileuca (Turner, 1933)
- Pseudonoorda lampra (Tams, 1935)
- Pseudonoorda metalloma Lower, 1903
- Pseudonoorda minor Munroe, 1974
- Pseudonoorda nigropunctalis (Hampson, 1899)
- Pseudonoorda nitidalis (Pagenstecher, 1900)
- Pseudonoorda noordimimalis (Hampson, 1917)
- Pseudonoorda photina (Tams, 1935)
- Pseudonoorda rubricostalis (Hampson, 1910)
