= Nanna naumanni =

Scientific classification
- Domain: Eukaryota
- Kingdom: Animalia
- Phylum: Arthropoda
- Class: Insecta
- Order: Lepidoptera
- Superfamily: Noctuoidea
- Family: Erebidae
- Subfamily: Arctiinae
- Genus: Nanna
- Species: N. naumanni

Binomial name
- Nanna naumanni Kühne, 2005

Species of moth

Nanna naumanni is a moth of the subfamily Arctiinae. It was described by Lars Kühne in 2005. It is found in Kenya.
