= Pygospila bivittalis =

Scientific classification
- Kingdom: Animalia
- Phylum: Arthropoda
- Class: Insecta
- Order: Lepidoptera
- Family: Crambidae
- Genus: Pygospila
- Species: P. bivittalis

Binomial name
- Pygospila bivittalis Walker, 1866

Synonyms
- Lomotropa vellerialis Snellen, 1891

Species of moth

Pygospila bivittalis is a moth in the family Crambidae. It was described by Francis Walker in 1866. It is found in India, China, Indonesia (Seram, Obi), New Guinea and Australia, where it has been recorded from Queensland.

Adults are cupreous brown, the forewings cupreous, purple tinged, with two silvery-white oblique streaks at the base, and with eight white semihyaline (almost glasslike) spots, of which four are subquadrate and larger than the rest. The hindwings are brown and somewhat woolly. The costal area is white.
