= Pseudocatharylla inclaralis =

Scientific classification
- Kingdom: Animalia
- Phylum: Arthropoda
- Clade: Pancrustacea
- Class: Insecta
- Order: Lepidoptera
- Family: Crambidae
- Subfamily: Crambinae
- Tribe: Calamotrophini
- Genus: Pseudocatharylla
- Species: P. inclaralis

Binomial name
- Pseudocatharylla inclaralis (Walker, 1863)

Synonyms
- Crambus inclaralis Walker, 1863; Crambus brachypterellus Walker, 1866; Crambus flavoflabellus Caradja, 1925; Chrysoteuchia flaviflabellus Hua, 2005; Pediasia albivena Okano, 1960

Species of moth

Pseudocatharylla inclaralis is a moth in the family Crambidae. It was described by Francis Walker in 1863. It is found in China (Jiangsu, Fujian, Guangdong, Shandong) and Japan.
