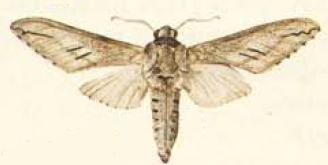

Scientific classification
- Kingdom: Animalia
- Phylum: Arthropoda
- Class: Insecta
- Order: Lepidoptera
- Family: Sphingidae
- Genus: Pantophaea
- Species: P. favillacea

Binomial name
- Pantophaea favillacea (Walker, 1866)

Synonyms
- Anceryx favillacea Walker, 1866; Pemba favillacea; Coenotes maximus Clark, 1922; Pemba distanti Rothschild & Jordan, 1903

= Pantophaea favillacea =

Species of moth

Pantophaea favillacea is a moth of the family Sphingidae. It is known from savanna and bush from eastern Kenya to Tanzania, Zambia, Angola, Zimbabwe and Mozambique.

The length of the forewings is 34–39 mm for males and about 48 mm for females and the wingspan is 69–85 mm.
