= Nanna diplisticta =

Scientific classification
- Domain: Eukaryota
- Kingdom: Animalia
- Phylum: Arthropoda
- Class: Insecta
- Order: Lepidoptera
- Superfamily: Noctuoidea
- Family: Erebidae
- Subfamily: Arctiinae
- Genus: Nanna
- Species: N. diplisticta

Binomial name
- Nanna diplisticta (Bethune-Baker, 1911)

Synonyms
- Ilema diplisticta Bethune-Baker, 1911

Species of moth

Nanna diplisticta is a moth of the subfamily Arctiinae. It was described by George Thomas Bethune-Baker in 1911. It is found in Angola, Cameroon and Nigeria.
