= Spidia inangulata =

Scientific classification
- Kingdom: Animalia
- Phylum: Arthropoda
- Clade: Pancrustacea
- Class: Insecta
- Order: Lepidoptera
- Family: Drepanidae
- Genus: Spidia
- Species: S. inangulata

Binomial name
- Spidia inangulata Watson, 1965

Species of hook-tip moth

Spidia inangulata is a moth in the family Drepanidae. It was described by Watson in 1965. It is found in Cameroon and Nigeria.
