= Pseudocatharylla chionopepla =

Scientific classification
- Kingdom: Animalia
- Phylum: Arthropoda
- Clade: Pancrustacea
- Class: Insecta
- Order: Lepidoptera
- Family: Crambidae
- Subfamily: Crambinae
- Tribe: Calamotrophini
- Genus: Pseudocatharylla
- Species: P. chionopepla

Binomial name
- Pseudocatharylla chionopepla (Hampson, 1919)

Synonyms
- Crambus chionopepla Hampson, 1919; Crambus chionostola Hampson, 1919

Species of moth

Pseudocatharylla chionopepla is a moth in the family Crambidae. It was described by George Hampson in 1919. It is found in Sri Lanka.
