= Nanna collinsii =

Scientific classification
- Domain: Eukaryota
- Kingdom: Animalia
- Phylum: Arthropoda
- Class: Insecta
- Order: Lepidoptera
- Superfamily: Noctuoidea
- Family: Erebidae
- Subfamily: Arctiinae
- Genus: Nanna
- Species: N. collinsii

Binomial name
- Nanna collinsii Kühne, 2007

Species of moth

Nanna collinsii is a moth of the subfamily Arctiinae. It was described by Lars Kühne in 2007. It is found in the Democratic Republic of the Congo and Kenya.
