= Pseudocatharylla flavipedellus =

Scientific classification
- Kingdom: Animalia
- Phylum: Arthropoda
- Clade: Pancrustacea
- Class: Insecta
- Order: Lepidoptera
- Family: Crambidae
- Subfamily: Crambinae
- Tribe: Calamotrophini
- Genus: Pseudocatharylla
- Species: P. flavipedellus

Binomial name
- Pseudocatharylla flavipedellus (Zeller, 1852)

Synonyms
- Crambus flavipedellus Zeller, 1852

Species of moth

Pseudocatharylla flavipedellus is a moth in the family Crambidae. It was described by Zeller in 1852. It is found in Mozambique, South Africa (KwaZulu-Natal) and Zimbabwe.
