= Pseudonoorda flammea =

Scientific classification
- Kingdom: Animalia
- Phylum: Arthropoda
- Clade: Pancrustacea
- Class: Insecta
- Order: Lepidoptera
- Family: Crambidae
- Genus: Pseudonoorda
- Species: P. flammea

Binomial name
- Pseudonoorda flammea Maes, 2012

Species of moth

Pseudonoorda flammea is a moth in the family Crambidae. It was described by Koen V. N. Maes in 2012. It is found in Cameroon and the Democratic Republic of the Congo (Bas Congo).
