= Pseudonoorda metalloma =

Scientific classification
- Domain: Eukaryota
- Kingdom: Animalia
- Phylum: Arthropoda
- Class: Insecta
- Order: Lepidoptera
- Family: Crambidae
- Genus: Pseudonoorda
- Species: P. metalloma

Binomial name
- Pseudonoorda metalloma (Lower, 1903)

Synonyms
- Noorda metalloma Lower, 1903

Species of moth

Pseudonoorda metalloma is a moth in the family Crambidae. It was described by Oswald Bertram Lower in 1903. It is found in Australia, where it has been recorded from Western Australia.
