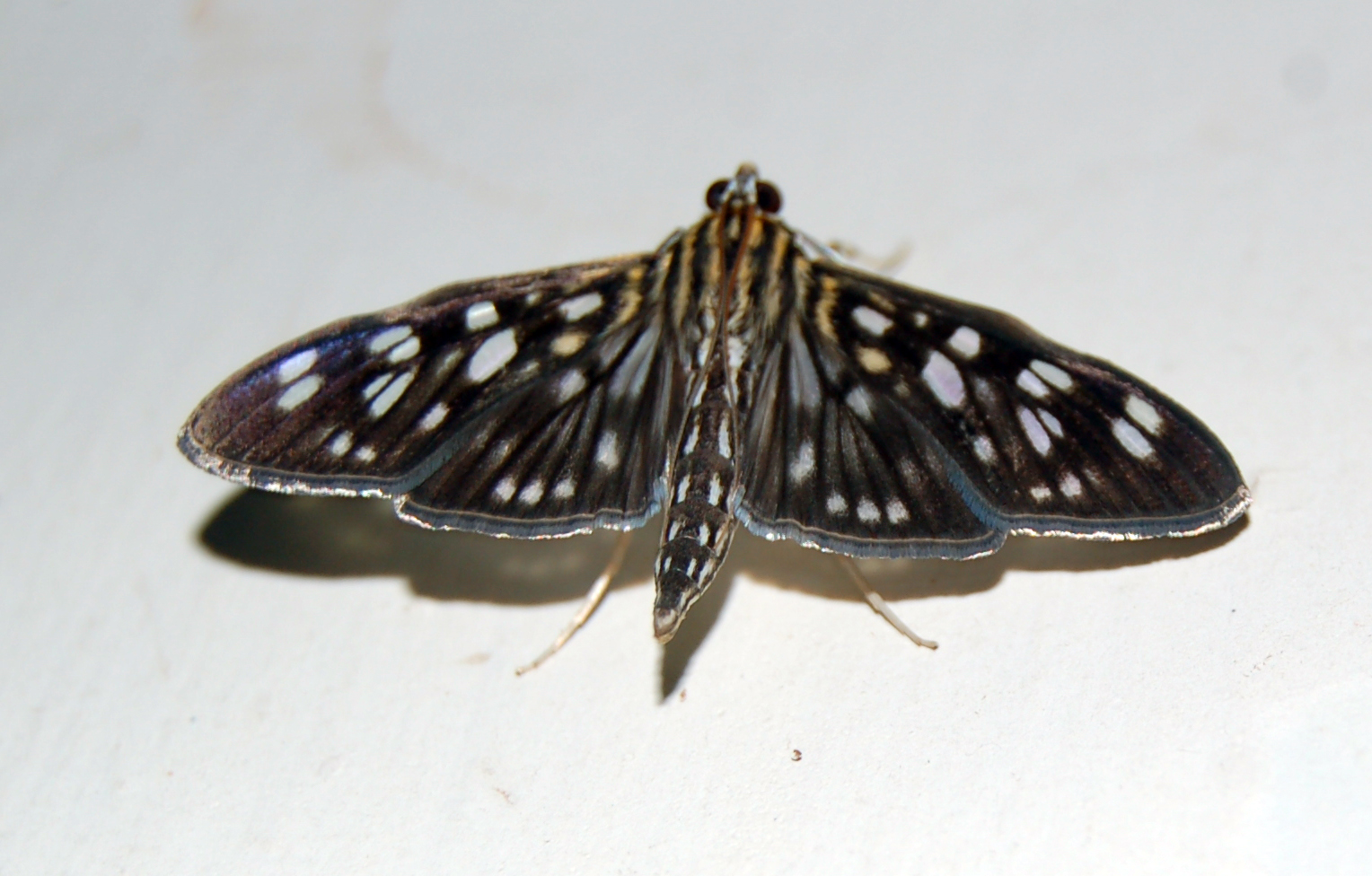
- Pygospila tyres

Scientific classification
- Kingdom: Animalia
- Phylum: Arthropoda
- Class: Insecta
- Order: Lepidoptera
- Family: Crambidae
- Tribe: Margaroniini
- Genus: Pygospila; Guenée, 1854

Synonyms
- Lomotropa Lederer, 1863; Pygosspila Lederer, 1863; Telespasta Swinhoe, 1906

= Pygospila =

Genus of moths

Pygospila is a genus of moths of the family Crambidae described by Achille Guenée in 1854.

== Species ==
- Pygospila bivittalis Walker, 1866
- Pygospila costiflexalis Guenée, 1854
- Pygospila cuprealis Swinhoe, 1892
- Pygospila hyalotypa Turner, 1908
- Pygospila imperialis Kenrick, 1907
- Pygospila macrogastra Meyrick, 1936
- Pygospila marginalis Kenrick, 1907
- Pygospila minoralis Caradja in Caradja & Meyrick, 1937
- Pygospila tyres (Cramer, 1779)
- Pygospila yuennanensis Caradja in Caradja & Meyrick, 1937
