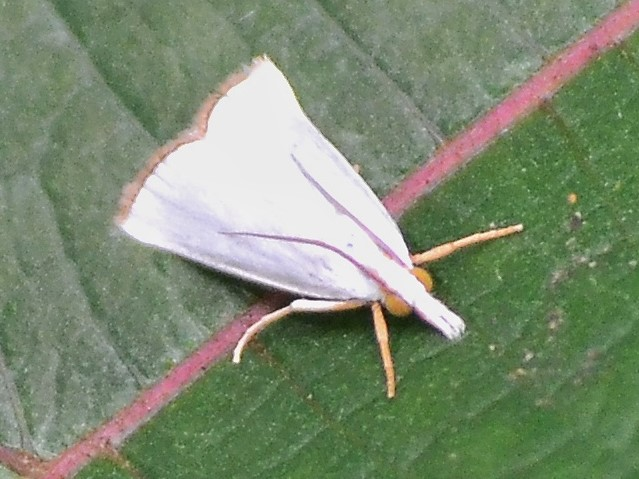

Scientific classification
- Kingdom: Animalia
- Phylum: Arthropoda
- Clade: Pancrustacea
- Class: Insecta
- Order: Lepidoptera
- Family: Crambidae
- Subfamily: Crambinae
- Tribe: Calamotrophini
- Genus: Pseudocatharylla
- Species: P. nigrociliella

Binomial name
- Pseudocatharylla nigrociliella (Zeller, 1863)

Synonyms
- Catharylla nigrociliella Zeller, 1863; Argyria nigricosta Hampson, 1891; Crambus nigriciliellus Hampson, 1896

= Pseudocatharylla nigrociliella =

Species of moth

Pseudocatharylla nigrociliella is a species of moth in the family Crambidae. It was first described by Philipp Christoph Zeller in 1863. It is found in India.
