= Scopula paradelpharia =

Scientific classification
- Kingdom: Animalia
- Phylum: Arthropoda
- Clade: Pancrustacea
- Class: Insecta
- Order: Lepidoptera
- Family: Geometridae
- Genus: Scopula
- Species: S. paradelpharia

Binomial name
- Scopula paradelpharia Prout, 1920

Species of geometer moth in subfamily Sterrhinae

Scopula paradelpharia is a moth of the family Geometridae. It is found in Ivory Coast, Kenya and Senegal.
