= Scopula pseudophema =

Scientific classification
- Kingdom: Animalia
- Phylum: Arthropoda
- Clade: Pancrustacea
- Class: Insecta
- Order: Lepidoptera
- Family: Geometridae
- Genus: Scopula
- Species: S. pseudophema

Binomial name
- Scopula pseudophema Prout, 1920

Species of geometer moth in subfamily Sterrhinae

Scopula pseudophema is a moth of the family Geometridae. It is found in Ivory Coast, Sierra Leone and Sudan.

The wingspan is 20–21 mm. The head and body are concolorous with the wings. The forewings are whitish ochreous, in places tinged with rather deeper ochreous.
