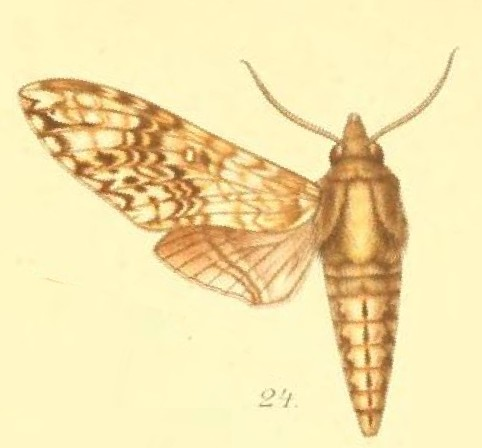
- Poliana buchholzi

Scientific classification
- Domain: Eukaryota
- Kingdom: Animalia
- Phylum: Arthropoda
- Class: Insecta
- Order: Lepidoptera
- Family: Sphingidae
- Genus: Poliana
- Species: P. buchholzi

Binomial name
- Poliana buchholzi (Plötz, 1880)

Synonyms
- Sphinx buchholzi Plötz, 1880; Protoparce weigli Möschler, 1887; Protoparce laucheana Druce, 1882

= Poliana buchholzi =

Species of moth

Poliana buchholzi is a moth of the family Sphingidae. It is known from forests from western Africa to Uganda and western Kenya.

The length of the forewings is 41–45 mm.
