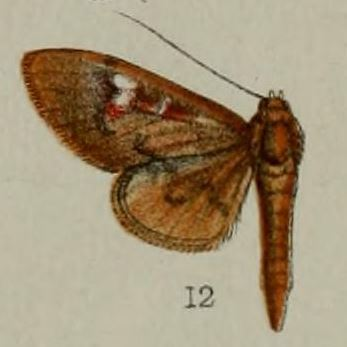

Scientific classification
- Kingdom: Animalia
- Phylum: Arthropoda
- Class: Insecta
- Order: Lepidoptera
- Family: Crambidae
- Genus: Syllepte
- Species: S. torsipex

Binomial name
- Syllepte torsipex (Hampson, 1898)

Synonyms
- Syllepta torsipex Hampson, 1898; Sylepta torsipex

= Syllepte torsipex =

Species of moth

Syllepte torsipex is a moth in the family Crambidae. It was described by George Hampson in 1898. It is found in Democratic Republic of the Congo, Ivory Coast, Sierra Leone and in Zambia.
