= Pseudonoorda edulis =

Scientific classification
- Domain: Eukaryota
- Kingdom: Animalia
- Phylum: Arthropoda
- Class: Insecta
- Order: Lepidoptera
- Family: Crambidae
- Genus: Pseudonoorda
- Species: P. edulis

Binomial name
- Pseudonoorda edulis Maes & Poligui, 2012

Species of moth

Pseudonoorda edulis is a moth in the family Crambidae. It was described by Koen V. N. Maes and René Noël Poligui in 2012. It is found in Cameroon, Gabon and Ivory Coast.

The larvae feed on Dacryodes edulis.
