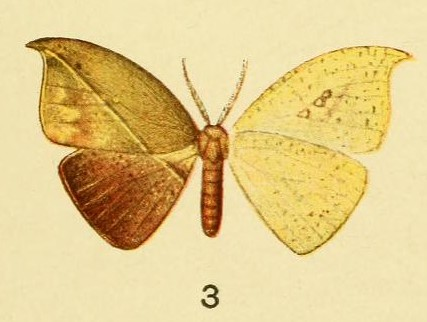

Scientific classification
- Domain: Eukaryota
- Kingdom: Animalia
- Phylum: Arthropoda
- Class: Insecta
- Order: Lepidoptera
- Family: Drepanidae
- Genus: Spidia
- Species: S. fenestrata

Binomial name
- Spidia fenestrata Butler, 1878

Synonyms
- Spidia divisa Aurivillius, 1906; Spidia fenestrata var. fenestriculata Gaede, 1927; Hemictenarcha rubrisecta Warren, 1898

= Spidia fenestrata =

Species of hook-tip moth

Spidia fenestrata is a moth in the family Drepanidae. It was described by Arthur Gardiner Butler in 1878. It is found in Angola, Cameroon, the Democratic Republic of the Congo, Ghana, Guinea, Ivory Coast, Liberia, Nigeria, Sierra Leone and Uganda.

The length of the forewings is 17.5–23 mm for males and 22.5–24 mm for females.
