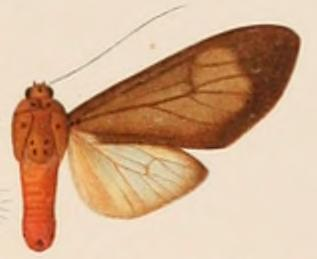
- Amerila puella rothi

Scientific classification
- Domain: Eukaryota
- Kingdom: Animalia
- Phylum: Arthropoda
- Class: Insecta
- Order: Lepidoptera
- Superfamily: Noctuoidea
- Family: Erebidae
- Subfamily: Arctiinae
- Genus: Amerila
- Species: A. puella

Binomial name
- Amerila puella (Fabricius, 1793)

Synonyms
- Noctua puella Fabricius, 1793; Amerila puella; Rhodogastria carneola Hampson, 1916; Amerila carneola; Rhodogastria carneola nigricornis Debauche, 1938; Amerila invidua Bethune-Baker, 1925 (Manuscript name); Rhodogastria rothi Rothschild, 1910; Amerila rothi; Rhodogastria uniformis Berio, 1935

= Amerila puella =

Species of moth

Amerila puella is a species of moth of the subfamily Arctiinae. It is found in Senegal, Sierra Leone, Ivory Coast, Ghana, Nigeria, Zaire, Uganda, Ethiopia, Kenya, Tanzania and Malawi.

== Subspecies ==
- Amerila puella puella (Guinea, Principe Island)
- Amerila puella carneola (Hampson, 1916) (Uganda, Tanzania, Malawi, Zaire and East Africa from Ethiopia to Uganda and Tanzania)
- Amerila puella invidua (Bethune-Baker, 1925) (West Africa from Senegal to Ivory Coast)
- Amerila puella rothi (Rothschild, 1910) (Ivory Coast, Nigeria, West Africa: southern Nigeria and Cameroon)
