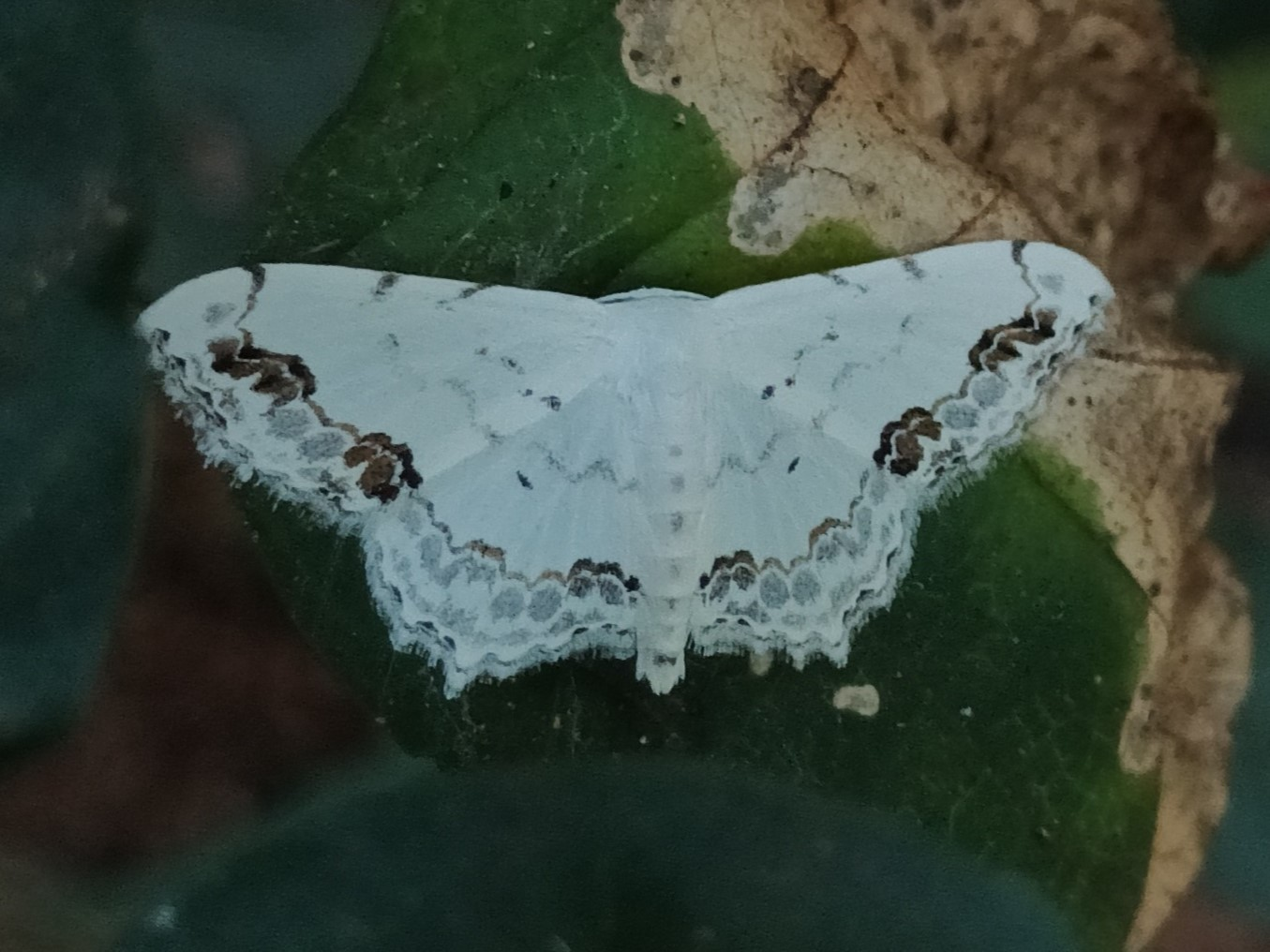

Scientific classification
- Domain: Eukaryota
- Kingdom: Animalia
- Phylum: Arthropoda
- Class: Insecta
- Order: Lepidoptera
- Family: Geometridae
- Genus: Scopula
- Species: S. pulchellata

Binomial name
- Scopula pulchellata (Fabricius, 1794)

Synonyms
- Phalaena pulchellata Fabricius, 1794; Craspedia discata Warren, 1897; Idaea grandicularia Swinhoe, 1886; Acidalia ligataria Walker, 1861; Acidalia metaspilaria Walker, 1861; Acidalia nictata Guenée, 1857; Acidalia perlineata Walker, 1861; Scopula perlineata obdiscata Prout, 1938; Scopula perlineata spilotis Prout, 1938; Acidalia spatiosaria Walker, 1866; Craspedia spilodorsata Warren, 1895; Scopula spilodorsata cosmeta Prout, 1938; Craspedia rufinubes Warren, 1900

= Scopula pulchellata =

Species of geometer moth in subfamily Sterrhinae

Scopula pulchellata is a moth of the family Geometridae. It is found in the Indo-Australian tropics, from India, Sri Lanka to Taiwan and the Solomon Islands, as well as in Africa.

== Description ==
Its wingspan is about 24 mm. Hindwings with more or less angled outer margin at vein 4. ochreous white colored moth. Frons fuscous. Forewings with a discocellular speck. Indistinct obliquely waved fuscous antemedial and medial lines, the latter on hindwing embracing the black discocellular spot. Both wings with waved postmedial line, with fuscous marks beyond it above middle of forewings and above inner margin of each wing. There is a sub-marginal fuscous marks series and a marginal black specks series.

== Subspecies ==
- Scopula pulchellata pulchellata
- Scopula pulchellata rufinubes (Warren, 1900)
- Scopula pulchellata semperi Prout, 1938
- Scopula pulchellata takowensis Prout, 1938
