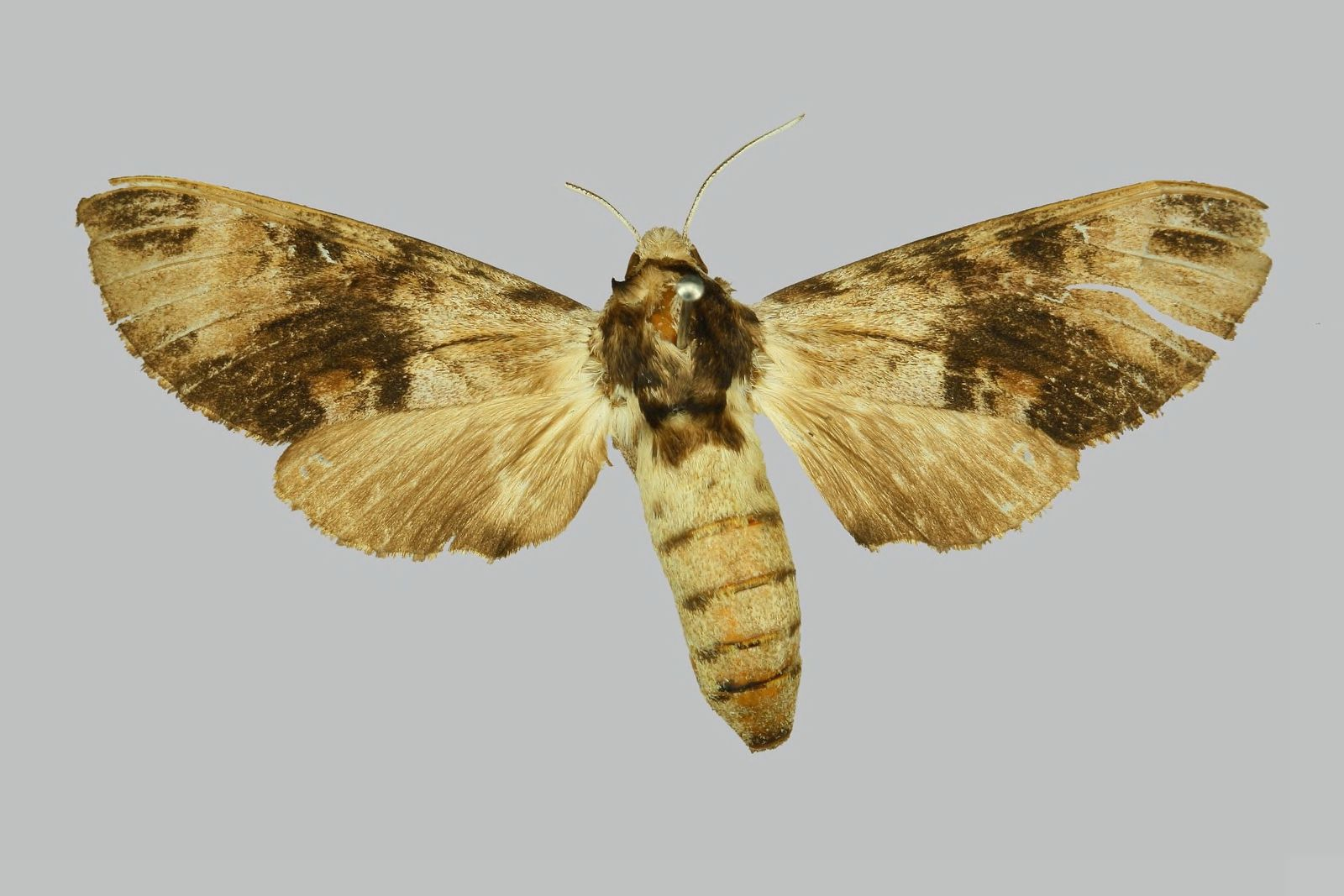

Scientific classification
- Kingdom: Animalia
- Phylum: Arthropoda
- Class: Insecta
- Order: Lepidoptera
- Family: Sphingidae
- Genus: Pantophaea
- Species: P. jordani

Binomial name
- Pantophaea jordani (Joicey & Talbot, 1916)

Synonyms
- Pemba jordani Joicey & Talbot, 1916; Pemba cardinalli Tams, 1925

= Pantophaea jordani =

Species of moth

Pantophaea jordani is a moth of the family Sphingidae. It is known from woodland and savanna from west Africa to Uganda.
