= Pseudocatharylla nemesis =

Scientific classification
- Kingdom: Animalia
- Phylum: Arthropoda
- Clade: Pancrustacea
- Class: Insecta
- Order: Lepidoptera
- Family: Crambidae
- Subfamily: Crambinae
- Tribe: Calamotrophini
- Genus: Pseudocatharylla
- Species: P. nemesis

Binomial name
- Pseudocatharylla nemesis Błeszyński, 1964

Species of moth

Pseudocatharylla nemesis is a moth in the family Crambidae. It was described by Stanisław Błeszyński in 1964. It is found in Ivory Coast.
