= Syllepte xanthothorax =

Scientific classification
- Kingdom: Animalia
- Phylum: Arthropoda
- Class: Insecta
- Order: Lepidoptera
- Family: Crambidae
- Genus: Syllepte
- Species: S. xanthothorax

Binomial name
- Syllepte xanthothorax (Meyrick, 1933)

Synonyms
- Sylepta xanthothorax Meyrick, 1933

Species of moth

Syllepte xanthothorax is a moth in the family Crambidae. It is found in the Democratic Republic of Congo, Ghana, Guinea, Ivory Coast and Sierra Leone.

The larvae feed on Cola nitida.
