= Eupithecia atomaria =

Scientific classification
- Kingdom: Animalia
- Phylum: Arthropoda
- Clade: Pancrustacea
- Class: Insecta
- Order: Lepidoptera
- Family: Geometridae
- Genus: Eupithecia
- Species: E. atomaria

Binomial name
- Eupithecia atomaria (Warren, 1902)

Synonyms
- Tephroclystia atomaria Warren, 1902

Species of moth

Eupithecia atomaria is a moth in the family Geometridae. It is found in Ivory Coast, Kenya and South Africa.
