= Spidia excentrica =

Scientific classification
- Kingdom: Animalia
- Phylum: Arthropoda
- Class: Insecta
- Order: Lepidoptera
- Family: Drepanidae
- Genus: Spidia
- Species: S. excentrica

Binomial name
- Spidia excentrica Strand, 1912

Species of hook-tip moth

Spidia excentrica is a moth in the family Drepanidae. It was described by Strand in 1912. It is found in Cameroon.
