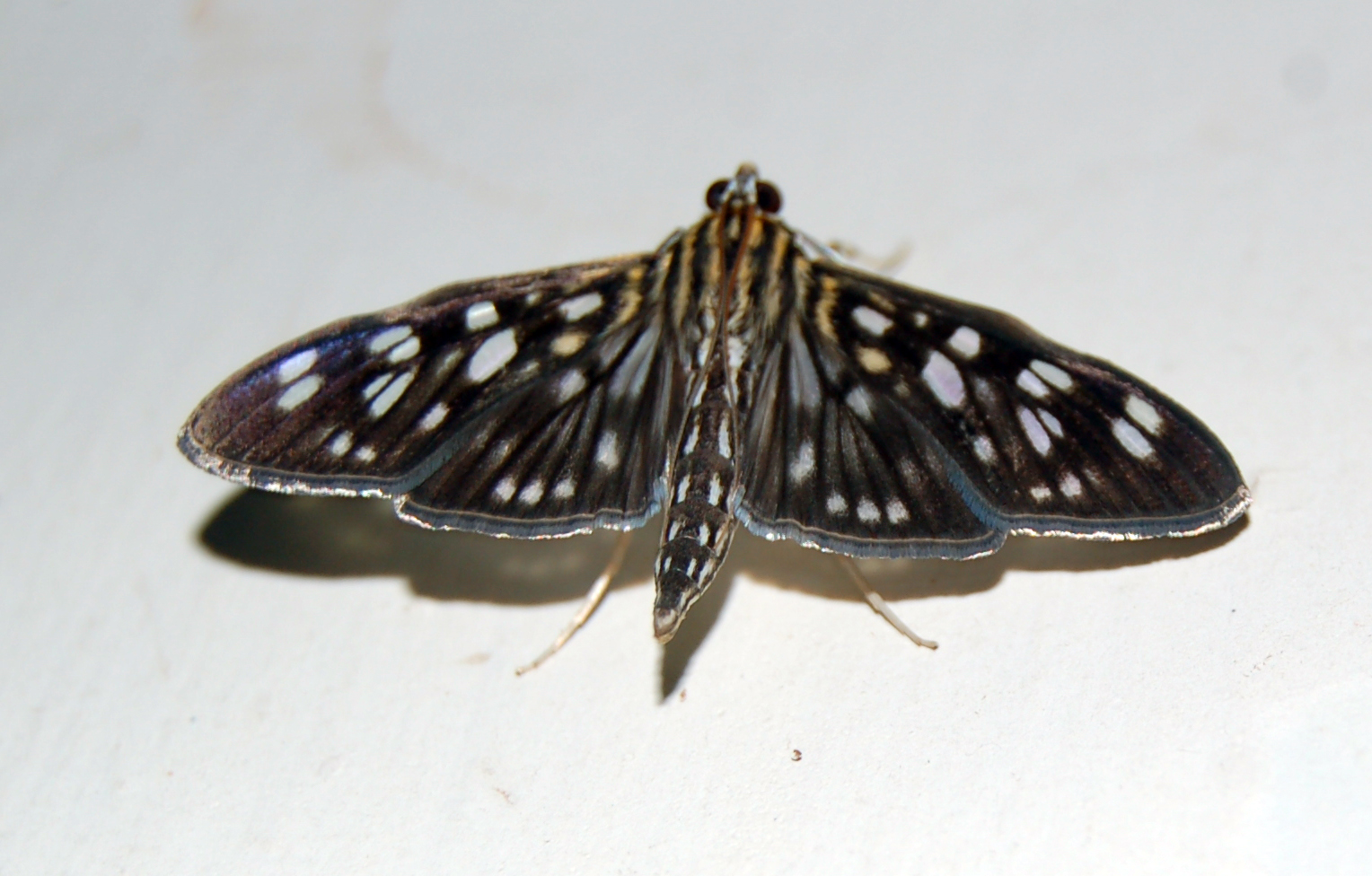

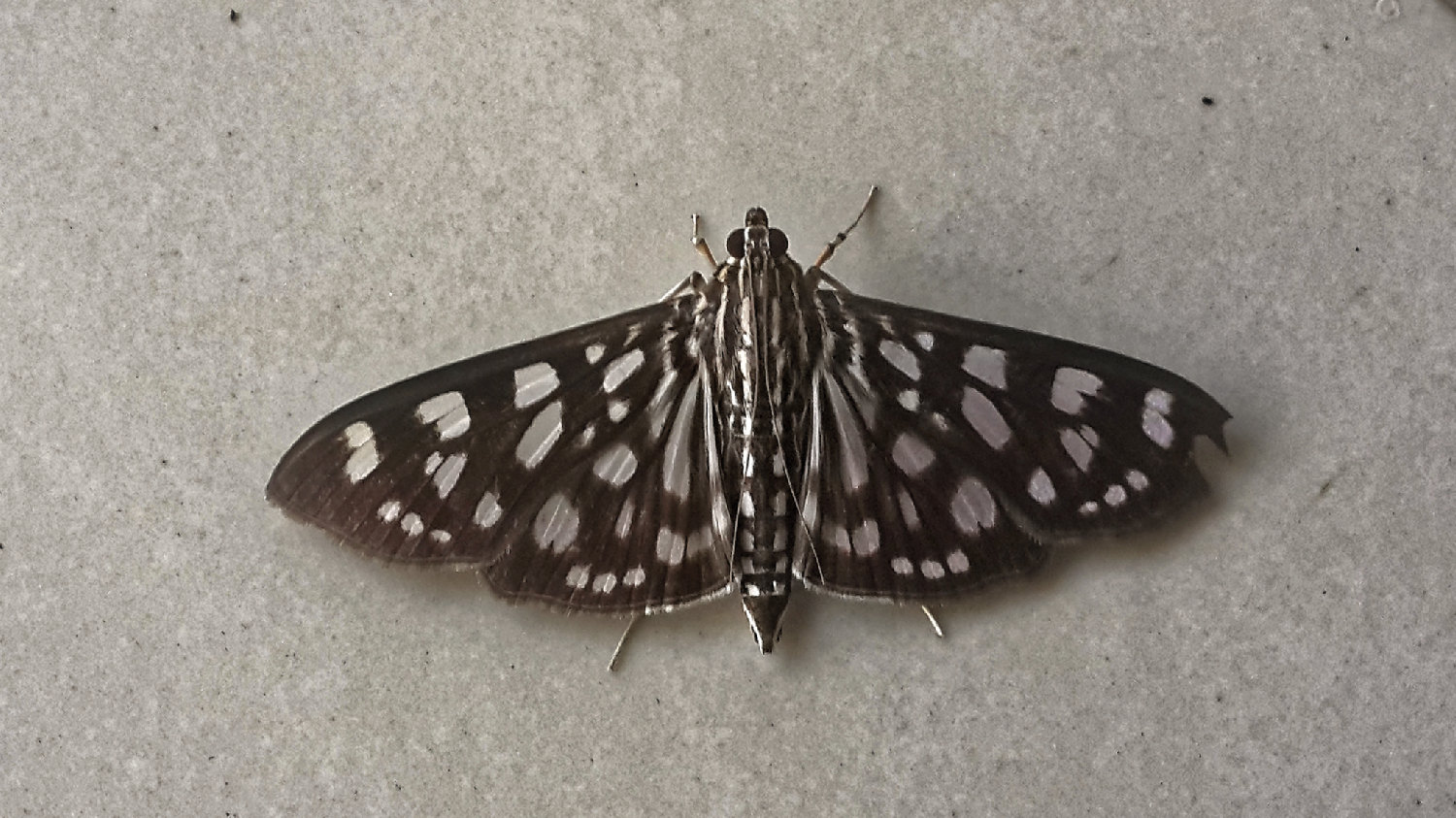

Scientific classification
- Kingdom: Animalia
- Phylum: Arthropoda
- Class: Insecta
- Order: Lepidoptera
- Family: Crambidae
- Genus: Pygospila
- Species: P. tyres

Binomial name
- Pygospila tyres (Cramer, 1780)

Synonyms
- Phalaena tyres Cramer, 1780; Pygospila tyridia Strand, 1920; Pygospila thyralis Hübner, 1825; Pygospila tyresalis Guenée, 1854

= Pygospila tyres =

Species of moth

Pygospila tyres is a species of moth of the family Crambidae described by Pieter Cramer in 1780. It is found in the rainforests of south-east Asia, including Hong Kong, India, Thailand and Queensland in Australia.

== Description ==
Palpi upturned, the 2nd joint broadly scaled in front, the 3rd porrect (extending forward) and lying on the hair of 2nd joint; maxillary palpi filiform and as long as the labial; frons rounded; antennae of male minutely ciliated; patagia extending beyond the metathorax; tibiae with the outer spurs half the length of the inner; abdomen long, male with the anal tuft large. Forewing with the costa arched towards apex; the outer margin oblique; the inner margin lobed before middle and somewhat excised towards outer angle; vein 3 from angle of cell; 4, 5 approximated for about one-third length; 7 curved and approximated to 8 and 9; 10 closely approximated to 8 and 9. Hindwing with the costa arched at middle; vein 2 from near angle of cell; 3 from the angle; 4 and 5 not approximated towards origin; 6 and 7 shortly stalked and curved, 7 anastomosing (fusing) slightly with 8.

The wingspan is about 40 mm.
