= Spidia planola =

Scientific classification
- Domain: Eukaryota
- Kingdom: Animalia
- Phylum: Arthropoda
- Class: Insecta
- Order: Lepidoptera
- Family: Drepanidae
- Genus: Spidia
- Species: S. planola

Binomial name
- Spidia planola Watson, 1965

Species of hook-tip moth

Spidia planola is a moth in the family Drepanidae. It was described by Watson in 1965. It is found in Ivory Coast and Sierra Leone.
