= List of moths of Zambia =

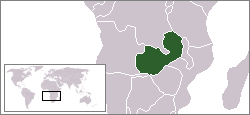
Location of Zambia

The moths of Zambia represent about 465 known moth species. The moths (mostly nocturnal) and butterflies (mostly diurnal) together make up the taxonomic order Lepidoptera.

This is a list of moth species which have been recorded in Zambia.

== Arctiidae ==
- Acantharctia atriramosa Hampson, 1907
- Alpenus dollmani (Hampson, 1920)
- Alpenus intacta (Hampson, 1916)
- Alpenus maculosa (Stoll, 1781)
- Amata chariessa (Jordan, 1936)
- Amata croceizona (Hampson, 1910)
- Amata miozona (Hampson, 1910)
- Amerila bubo (Walker, 1855)
- Amerila lupia (Druce, 1887)
- Amsacta aureolimbata Rothschild, 1910
- Amsacta grammiphlebia Hampson, 1901
- Anaphosia eurygrapha Hampson, 1910
- Balacra elegans Aurivillius, 1892
- Balacra rubrostriata (Aurivillius, 1892)
- Bergeria haematochrysa Kiriakoff, 1952
- Binna scita (Walker, 1865)
- Creatonotos leucanioides Holland, 1893
- Creatonotos punctivitta (Walker, 1854)
- Eilema elegans (Butler, 1877)
- Eilema heterogyna (Hampson, 1910)
- Estigmene ansorgei Rothschild, 1910
- Estigmene neuriastis Hampson, 1907
- Estigmene sabulosa Romieux, 1943
- Estigmene trivitta (Walker, 1855)
- Eyralpenus diplosticta (Hampson, 1900)
- Eyralpenus meinhofi (Bartel, 1903)
- Eyralpenus metaxantha (Hampson, 1920)
- Eyralpenus scioana (Oberthür, 1880)
- Mecistorhabdia haematoessa (Holland, 1893)
- Metarctia lateritia Herrich-Schäffer, 1855
- Metarctia robusta (Kiriakoff, 1973)
- Micralarctia punctulatum (Wallengren, 1860)
- Nyctemera itokina (Aurivillius, 1904)
- Paralpenus flavicosta (Hampson, 1909)
- Paramelisa dollmani Hampson, 1920
- Pseudlepista atrizona Hampson, 1910
- Secusio atrizonata Hampson, 1910
- Spilosoma latiradiata (Hampson, 1901)
- Spilosoma lentifasciata (Hampson, 1916)
- Spilosoma lineata Walker, 1855
- Teracotona rhodophaea (Walker, 1865)
- Utetheisa pulchella (Linnaeus, 1758)

== Brahmaeidae ==
- Dactyloceras lucina (Drury, 1872)

== Cossidae ==
- Phragmataecia irrorata Hampson, 1910

== Crambidae ==
- Agathodes musivalis Guenée, 1854
- Classeya quadricuspis (Hampson, 1919)
- Crocidophora caffralis Hampson, 1910
- Euclasta varii Popescu-Gorj & Constantinescu, 1973
- Nomophila brevispinalis Munroe, 1973
- Pilocrocis dichocrosialis Hampson, 1912

== Drepanidae ==
- Gonoreta forcipulata Watson, 1965
- Negera natalensis (Felder, 1874)

== Eupterotidae ==
- Epijana cosima (Plötz, 1880)
- Hibrildes crawshayi Butler, 1896
- Jana eurymas Herrich-Schäffer, 1854
- Phiala aurivillii (Bethune-Baker, 1915)

== Gelechiidae ==
- Anarsia agricola Walsingham, 1891

== Geometridae ==
- Cacostegania australis Warren, 1901
- Cacostegania confusa (Warren, 1901)
- Chiasmia ammodes (Prout, 1922)
- Chiasmia crassata (Warren, 1897)
- Chiasmia curvifascia (Warren, 1897)
- Chiasmia kilimanjarensis (Holland, 1892)
- Chiasmia procidata (Guenée, 1858)
- Chlorissa albistrigulata (Warren, 1897)
- Chrysocraspeda apseogramma (Prout, 1932)
- Chrysocraspeda dollmani (Prout, 1932)
- Chrysocraspeda subminiosa (Prout, 1932)
- Cleora rostella D. S. Fletcher, 1967
- Collesis mimica Warren, 1897
- Cyclophora inaequalis (Warren, 1902)
- Discomiosis crescentifera (Warren, 1902)
- Epigynopteryx flavedinaria (Guenée, 1857)
- Erastria leucicolor (Butler, 1875)
- Erastria madecassaria (Boisduval, 1833)
- Idaea auriflua (Warren, 1902)
- Oaracta maculata (Warren, 1897)
- Omizodes rubrifasciata (Butler, 1896)
- Omphalucha brunnea (Warren, 1899)
- Orbamia octomaculata (Wallengren, 1872)
- Orbamia subaurata (Warren, 1899)
- Scopula argentidisca (Warren, 1902)
- Scopula concurrens (Warren, 1897)
- Scopula curvimargo (Warren, 1900)
- Scopula natalica (Butler, 1875)
- Syncollesis tiviae Prout, 1934
- Traminda neptunaria (Guenée, 1858)
- Zamarada acosmeta Prout, 1921
- Zamarada aequilumata D. S. Fletcher, 1974
- Zamarada arguta D. S. Fletcher, 1974
- Zamarada bathyscaphes Prout, 1912
- Zamarada crystallophana Mabille, 1900
- Zamarada deceptrix Warren, 1914
- Zamarada denticatella Prout, 1922
- Zamarada differens Bastelberger, 1907
- Zamarada dorsiplaga Prout, 1922
- Zamarada excavata Bethune-Baker, 1913
- Zamarada flavicaput Warren, 1901
- Zamarada gamma D. S. Fletcher, 1958
- Zamarada glareosa Bastelberger, 1909
- Zamarada gracilata D. S. Fletcher, 1974
- Zamarada ignicosta Prout, 1912
- Zamarada janata D. S. Fletcher, 1974
- Zamarada labifera Prout, 1915
- Zamarada metrioscaphes Prout, 1912
- Zamarada plana Bastelberger, 1909
- Zamarada polyctemon Prout, 1932
- Zamarada psi D. S. Fletcher, 1974
- Zamarada purimargo Prout, 1912
- Zamarada rubrifascia Pinhey, 1962
- Zamarada rufilinearia Swinhoe, 1904
- Zamarada scintillans Bastelberger, 1909
- Zamarada seydeli D. S. Fletcher, 1974
- Zamarada unisona D. S. Fletcher, 1974
- Zamarada varii D. S. Fletcher, 1974

== Gracillariidae ==
- Aristaea onychota (Meyrick, 1908)

== Himantopteridae ==
- Pedoptila nigrocristata Joicey & Talbot, 1921

== Lasiocampidae ==
- Bombycopsis venosa (Butler, 1895)
- Catalebeda jamesoni (Bethune-Baker, 1908)
- Chrysopsyche pyriphlecta Tams, 1930
- Chrysopsyche pyrodes Tams, 1931
- Dollmania plinthochroa Tams, 1930
- Epitrabala nyassana (Aurivillius, 1909)
- Eutricha morosa (Walker, 1865)
- Euwallengrenia reducta (Walker, 1855)
- Filiola lanceolata (Hering, 1932)
- Gonometa griseocincta Hampson, 1910
- Grammodora nigrolineata (Aurivillius, 1895)
- Grellada marshalli (Aurivillius, 1902)
- Mallocampa cornutiventris Tams, 1929
- Mallocampa dollmani (Tams, 1925)
- Metajana hypolispa Tams, 1930
- Pachymeta immunda (Holland, 1893)
- Pachymetana horridula (Tams, 1925)
- Pallastica pallens (Bethune-Baker, 1908)
- Philotherma clara Bethune-Baker, 1908
- Pseudometa canescens Tams, 1925
- Pseudometa choba (Druce, 1899)
- Pseudometa dollmani Tams, 1925
- Sonitha lila Zolotuhin & Prozorov, 2010
- Stenophatna cymographa (Hampson, 1910)
- Stenophatna marshalli Aurivillius, 1909
- Stenophatna rothschildi (Tams, 1936)
- Stenophatna tamsi (Kiriakoff, 1963)
- Stoermeriana graberi (Dewitz, 1881)
- Stoermeriana sjostedti (Aurivillius, 1902)
- Stoermeriana tessmanni (Strand, 1912)
- Streblote rufaria (Bethune-Baker, 1908)
- Theophasida superba (Aurivillius, 1914)
- Trabala charon Druce, 1910

== Lemoniidae ==
- Sabalia barnsi Prout, 1918
- Sabalia picarina Walker, 1865

== Limacodidae ==
- Chrysopoloma variegata Hering, 1937
- Hadraphe ethiopica (Bethune-Baker, 1915)
- Latoiola viridifusca (Pinhey, 1968)
- Niphadolepis griseicostalis West, 1940
- Oidemaskelis eurota Bethune-Baker, 1915
- Omocena dollmani West, 1940
- Thosea cataractae West, 1937

== Lymantriidae ==
- Barlowia pyrilampes Collenette, 1931
- Crorema cartera Collenette, 1939
- Euproctis aethiopica (Bethune-Baker, 1908)
- Euproctis apatela (Tams, 1930)
- Homochira rendalli (Distant, 1897)
- Hyaloperina nudiuscula Aurivillius, 1904
- Laelia marginepunctata Bethune-Baker, 1908
- Rhodesana crenulata Bethune-Baker, 1908
- Tamsita ochthoeba (Hampson, 1920)

== Metarbelidae ==
- Arbelodes claudiae Lehmann, 2010
- Arbelodes prochesi Lehmann, 2010
- Mountelgonia abercornensis Lehmann, 2013

== Noctuidae ==
- Achaea catella Guenée, 1852
- Achaea dasybasis Hampson, 1913
- Acontia atrisignata Hampson, 1918
- Acontia aurelia Hacker, Legrain & Fibiger, 2008
- Acontia niphogona (Hampson, 1909)
- Acontia submutata Hacker, Legrain & Fibiger, 2008
- Acontia wahlbergi Wallengren, 1856
- Agoma trimenii (Felder, 1874)
- Amyna ruptirena Hampson, 1910
- Andrhippuris caudaequina Karsch, 1895
- Asota speciosa (Drury, 1773)
- Aspidifrontia corticea (Hampson, 1910)
- Athetis camptogramma (Hampson, 1910)
- Attatha ethiopica Hampson, 1910
- Audea humeralis Hampson, 1902
- Carpostalagma signata Talbot, 1932
- Chrysodeixis acuta (Walker, [1858])
- Cirrodes phoenicea Hampson, 1910
- Colpocheilopteryx operatrix (Wallengren, 1860)
- Corgatha hypoxantha Hampson, 1910
- Cortyta polycyma (Hampson, 1909)
- Crameria amabilis (Drury, 1773)
- Ctenusa pallida (Hampson, 1902)
- Cyligramma amblyops Mabille, 1891
- Cyligramma latona (Cramer, 1775)
- Deinopa flavida Hampson, 1926
- Digama aganais (Felder, 1874)
- Dysgonia erectata (Hampson, 1902)
- Dysgonia macrorhyncha (Hampson, 1913)
- Dysgonia mesonephele (Hampson, 1910)
- Dysgonia porphyrescens (Hampson, 1910)
- Dysgonia proxima (Hampson, 1902)
- Dysgonia torrida (Guenée, 1852)
- Entomogramma pardus Guenée, 1852
- Erebus walkeri (Butler, 1875)
- Ethioterpia neavi Hampson, 1910
- Eublemma trigramma Hampson, 1910
- Eudrapa grisea Pinhey, 1968
- Eulocastra aethiops (Distant, 1898)
- Eustrotia foedalis (Walker, 1866)
- Eustrotia perirrorata Hampson, 1918
- Eutelia symphonica Hampson, 1902
- Grammodes geometrica (Fabricius, 1775)
- Grammodes microgonia (Hampson, 1910)
- Heliophisma xanthoptera (Hampson, 1910)
- Heraclia aemulatrix (Westwood, 1881)
- Heraclia atriventralis (Hampson, 1910)
- Heraclia flavipennis (Bartel, 1903)
- Heraclia limbomaculata (Strand, 1909)
- Heraclia monslunensis (Hampson, 1901)
- Hespagarista caudata (Dewitz, 1879)
- Hespagarista eburnea Jordan, 1915
- Hoplarista haemaplaga Hampson, 1910
- Hypopyra capensis Herrich-Schäffer, 1854
- Lepidodelta phoenicraspis (Hampson, 1910)
- Leucovis alba (Rothschild, 1897)
- Lophoptera litigiosa (Boisduval, 1833)
- Masalia albipuncta (Hampson, 1910)
- Masalia flavistrigata (Hampson, 1903)
- Masalia galatheae (Wallengren, 1856)
- Masalia sublimis (Berio, 1962)
- Masalia transvaalica (Distant, 1902)
- Mimasura innotata Hampson, 1910
- Mimasura quadripuncta Hampson, 1910
- Mitrophrys gynandra Jordan, 1913
- Mocis frugalis (Fabricius, 1775)
- Mocis mayeri (Boisduval, 1833)
- Mocis mutuaria (Walker, 1858)
- Mocis persinuosa (Hampson, 1910)
- Ochropleura leucogaster (Freyer, 1831)
- Ophisma albitermia (Hampson, 1910)
- Ophiusa david (Holland, 1894)
- Ophiusa gonoptera Hampson, 1910
- Ophiusa obsolescens (Hampson, 1918)
- Ophiusa tettensis (Hopffer, 1857)
- Ophiusa tumiditermina Hampson, 1910
- Oraesia wintgensi (Strand, 1909)
- Ozarba apicalis Hampson, 1910
- Ozarba hemimelaena Hampson, 1910
- Ozarba subterminalis Hampson, 1910
- Parachalciope albifissa (Hampson, 1910)
- Parachalciope benitensis (Holland, 1894)
- Parachalciope deltifera (Felder & Rogenhofer, 1874)
- Parachalciope mahura (Felder & Rogenhofer, 1874)
- Phaegorista similis Walker, 1869
- Phaegorista xanthosoma Hampson, 1910
- Phytometra hypopsamma (Hampson, 1926)
- Plecopterodes griseicilia (Hampson, 1910)
- Plecopterodes heterochroa (Hampson, 1910)
- Plecopterodes melliflua (Holland, 1897)
- Plecopterodes molybdopasta (Hampson, 1910)
- Pseudospiris paidiformis Butler, 1895
- Rhanidophora odontophora Hampson, 1926
- Rhynchina leucodonta Hampson, 1910
- Thyas parallelipipeda (Guenée, 1852)
- Thyatirina achatina (Weymer, 1896)
- Thysanoplusia cupreomicans (Hampson, 1909)

== Nolidae ==
- Aiteta thermistis (Hampson, 1910)
- Arcyophora endoglauca (Hampson, 1910)
- Chlorozada metaleuca (Hampson, 1905)
- Neaxestis irrorata (Hampson, 1910)
- Neaxestis piperitella (Strand, 1909)
- Negeta albigrisea (Hampson, 1910)
- Negeta lacteata (Hampson, 1910)
- Nola foviferoides Poole, 1989
- Odontestis fuscicona (Hampson, 1910)
- Odontestis striata Hampson, 1912
- Westermannia oediplaga Hampson, 1910

== Notodontidae ==
- Antizana sparsata Gaede, 1928
- Crestonica pinheyi Kiriakoff, 1968
- Deinarchia agramma (Hampson, 1910)
- Epicerura pergrisea (Hampson, 1910)
- Hampsonita esmeralda (Hampson, 1910)
- Heraia thalassina (Hampson, 1910)
- Iridoplitis iridescens Kiriakoff, 1955
- Janthinisca rosita Kiriakoff, 1968
- Paradrallia rhodesi Bethune-Baker, 1908
- Polelassothys callista Tams, 1930
- Polienus marginestriatus Kiriakoff, 1975
- Quista cinereomixta Kiriakoff, 1959
- Scalmicauda auribasis Kiriakoff, 1975
- Scranciola multilineata (Gaede, 1928)
- Stauropida griseola Kiriakoff, 1962
- Synete vaumaculata Kiriakoff, 1962
- Trotonotus subapicalis Gaede, 1928

== Psychidae ==
- Eumeta cervina Druce, 1887

== Pterophoridae ==
- Lantanophaga pusillidactylus (Walker, 1864)

== Pyralidae ==
- Aphomia argentia Whalley, 1964
- Hypsopygia mauritialis (Boisduval, 1833)

== Saturniidae ==
- Adafroptilum incana (Sonthonnax, 1899)
- Antistathmoptera daltonae Tams, 1935
- Argema kuhnei Pinhey, 1969
- Athletes gigas (Sonthonnax, 1902)
- Athletes semialba (Sonthonnax, 1904)
- Aurivillius seydeli Rougeot, 1962
- Bunaeopsis angolana (Le Cerf, 1918)
- Bunaeopsis hersilia (Westwood, 1849)
- Bunaeopsis jacksoni (Jordan, 1908)
- Bunaeopsis licharbas (Maassen & Weymer, 1885)
- Bunaeopsis oubie (Guérin-Méneville, 1849)
- Bunaeopsis phidias (Weymer, 1909)
- Bunaeopsis saffronica Pinhey, 1972
- Campimoptilum kuntzei (Dewitz, 1881)
- Cinabra hyperbius (Westwood, 1881)
- Cirina forda (Westwood, 1849)
- Decachorda bouvieri Hering, 1929
- Decachorda pomona (Weymer, 1892)
- Decachorda rosea Aurivillius, 1898
- Epiphora antinorii (Oberthür, 1880)
- Epiphora bauhiniae (Guérin-Méneville, 1832)
- Epiphora mythimnia (Westwood, 1849)
- Epiphora rectifascia Rothschild, 1907
- Gonimbrasia desena Vinciguerra, 2009
- Gonimbrasia rectilineata (Sonthonnax, 1899)
- Gonimbrasia tyrrhea (Cramer, 1775)
- Gonimbrasia zambesina (Walker, 1865)
- Gynanisa albescens Sonthonnax, 1904
- Gynanisa ata Strand, 1911
- Gynanisa maja (Klug, 1836)
- Heniocha apollonia (Cramer, 1779)
- Heniocha marnois (Rogenhofer, 1891)
- Holocerina agomensis (Karsch, 1896)
- Holocerina angulata (Aurivillius, 1893)
- Holocerina smilax (Westwood, 1849)
- Imbrasia ertli Rebel, 1904
- Lobobunaea angasana (Westwood, 1849)
- Lobobunaea phaedusa (Drury, 1782)
- Lobobunaea rosea (Sonthonnax, 1899)
- Ludia orinoptena Karsch, 1892
- Melanocera parva Rothschild, 1907
- Melanocera sufferti (Weymer, 1896)
- Micragone ansorgei (Rothschild, 1907)
- Micragone cana (Aurivillius, 1893)
- Micragone lichenodes (Holland, 1893)
- Micragone nubifera Bouvier, 1936
- Nudaurelia alopia Westwood, 1849
- Nudaurelia carnegiei Janse, 1918
- Nudaurelia dione (Fabricius, 1793)
- Nudaurelia gueinzii (Staudinger, 1872)
- Nudaurelia macrops Rebel, 1917
- Nudaurelia macrothyris (Rothschild, 1906)
- Orthogonioptilum adiegetum Karsch, 1892
- Pseudantheraea imperator Rougeot, 1962
- Pseudaphelia apollinaris (Boisduval, 1847)
- Pseudimbrasia deyrollei (J. Thomson, 1858)
- Pseudobunaea callista (Jordan, 1910)
- Pseudobunaea heyeri (Weymer, 1896)
- Pseudobunaea irius (Fabricius, 1793)
- Pseudobunaea tyrrhena (Westwood, 1849)
- Rohaniella pygmaea (Maassen & Weymer, 1885)
- Tagoropsis hanningtoni (Butler, 1883)
- Ubaena dolabella (Druce, 1886)
- Ubaena fuelleborniana Karsch, 1900
- Usta terpsichore (Maassen & Weymer, 1885)

== Sesiidae ==
- Chamanthedon chrysopasta Hampson, 1919
- Homogyna sanguicosta Hampson, 1919
- Homogyna spadicicorpus Prout, 1919
- Lepidopoda pictipes Hampson, 1919
- Megalosphecia callosoma Hampson, 1919
- Melittia aureosquamata (Wallengren, 1863)
- Melittia chrysobapta Hampson, 1919
- Melittia natalensis Butler, 1874
- Melittia oedipus Oberthür, 1878
- Paranthrene chalcochlora Hampson, 1919
- Paranthrene propyria Hampson, 1919
- Synanthedon cyanescens (Hampson, 1910)
- Synanthedon flavipalpis (Hampson, 1910)
- Thyranthrene obliquizona (Hampson, 1910)

== Sphingidae ==
- Acanthosphinx guessfeldti (Dewitz, 1879)
- Afroclanis calcareus (Rothschild & Jordan, 1907)
- Afrosphinx amabilis (Jordan, 1911)
- Andriasa mitchelli Hayes, 1973
- Antinephele lunulata Rothschild & Jordan, 1903
- Basiothia aureata (Karsch, 1891)
- Chaerocina dohertyi Rothschild & Jordan, 1903
- Dovania poecila Rothschild & Jordan, 1903
- Euchloron megaera (Linnaeus, 1758)
- Hippotion roseipennis (Butler, 1882)
- Hippotion stigma (Rothschild & Jordan, 1903)
- Leptoclanis pulchra Rothschild & Jordan, 1903
- Leucophlebia afra Karsch, 1891
- Likoma apicalis Rothschild & Jordan, 1903
- Neoclanis basalis (Walker, 1866)
- Neopolyptychus convexus (Rothschild & Jordan, 1903)
- Nephele lannini Jordan, 1926
- Nephele rosae Butler, 1875
- Pantophaea oneili (Clark, 1925)
- Phylloxiphia formosa (Schultze, 1914)
- Phylloxiphia metria (Jordan, 1920)
- Phylloxiphia punctum (Rothschild, 1907)
- Phylloxiphia vicina (Rothschild & Jordan, 1915)
- Polyptychoides grayii (Walker, 1856)
- Polyptychoides niloticus (Jordan, 1921)
- Polyptychus baxteri Rothschild & Jordan, 1908
- Polyptychus coryndoni Rothschild & Jordan, 1903
- Polyptychus hollandi Rothschild & Jordan, 1903
- Polyptychus murinus Rothschild, 1904
- Praedora marshalli Rothschild & Jordan, 1903
- Praedora plagiata Rothschild & Jordan, 1903
- Rhodafra marshalli Rothschild & Jordan, 1903
- Rufoclanis numosae (Wallengren, 1860)
- Sphingonaepiopsis ansorgei Rothschild, 1904
- Temnora albilinea Rothschild, 1904
- Temnora burdoni Carcasson, 1968
- Temnora elegans (Rothschild, 1895)
- Temnora funebris (Holland, 1893)
- Temnora griseata Rothschild & Jordan, 1903
- Temnora iapygoides (Holland, 1889)
- Temnora livida (Holland, 1889)
- Temnora natalis Walker, 1856
- Temnora pylades Rothschild & Jordan, 1903
- Temnora scitula (Holland, 1889)
- Temnora spiritus (Holland, 1893)
- Theretra capensis (Linnaeus, 1764)

== Thyrididae ==
- Arniocera chalcopasta Hampson, 1910
- Arniocera cyanoxantha (Mabille, 1893)
- Bupota tranquilla Whalley, 1971
- Dilophura caudata (Jordan, 1907)
- Dysodia constellata Warren, 1908
- Dysodia crassa (Walker, 1865)
- Dysodia intermedia (Walker, 1865)
- Kalenga culanota Whalley, 1971
- Kalenga maculanota Whalley, 1971
- Netrocera hemichrysa (Hampson, 1910)

== Tineidae ==
- Acridotarsa melipecta (Meyrick, 1915)
- Ceratophaga ethadopa (Meyrick, 1938)
- Ceratophaga lichmodes (Meyrick, 1921)
- Ceratophaga vastellus (Zeller, 1852)
- Cimitra texturata (Gozmány, 1967)
- Criticonoma crassa Gozmány & Vári, 1973
- Criticonoma episcardina (Gozmány, 1965)
- Cubitofusa pseudoglebata (Gozmány, 1967)
- Cubitofusa seydeli (Gozmány, 1967)
- Drosica abjectella Walker, 1963
- Hapsifera glebata Meyrick, 1908
- Hapsifera marmarota Meyrick, 1914
- Hapsifera septica Meyrick, 1908
- Hyperbola hesperis Gozmány, 1967
- Hyperbola homogena Gozmány, 1967
- Hyperbola moschias (Meyrick, 1914)
- Hyperbola phocina (Meyrick, 1908)
- Monopis megalodelta Meyrick, 1908
- Monopis rejectella (Walker, 1864)
- Morophaga soror Gozmány, 1965
- Organodesma erinacea (Walker, 1863)
- Organodesma onomasta Gozmány & Vári, 1975
- Organodesma petaloxantha (Meyrick, 1931)
- Paraptica concinerata Meyrick, 1917
- Perissomastix fulvicoma (Meyrick, 1921)
- Perissomastix titanea Gozmány, 1967
- Pitharcha atrisecta (Meyrick, 1918)
- Pitharcha chalinaea Meyrick, 1908
- Sphallestasis oenopis (Meyrick, 1908)
- Tinea subalbidella Stainton, 1867

== Tortricidae ==
- Cornesia ormoperla Razowski, 1981
- Eccopsis incultana (Walker, 1863)

== Zygaenidae ==
- Astyloneura trefurthi Gaede, 1914
- Syringura triplex (Plötz, 1880)
