= Epiphora =

Epiphora may refer to:

- Epiphora (medicine), an excessive tear production usually a result from an irritation of the eye
- Epistrophe, also known as epiphora, the repetition of the same word or words at the end of successive phrases, clauses or sentences
- Epiphora (fungus), a fungus genus in the order Dothideomycetes
- Epiphora (moth), a moth genus in the family Saturniidae
- Epiphora, an orchid genus nowadays considered a synonym of Polystachya
