= Homogyna xanthophora =

Scientific classification
- Kingdom: Animalia
- Phylum: Arthropoda
- Clade: Pancrustacea
- Class: Insecta
- Order: Lepidoptera
- Family: Sesiidae
- Genus: Homogyna
- Species: H. xanthophora

Binomial name
- Homogyna xanthophora (Hampson, 1910)

Synonyms
- Tinthia xanthophora Hampson, 1910

Species of moth

Homogyna xanthophora is a moth of the family Sesiidae. It is known from South Africa.
