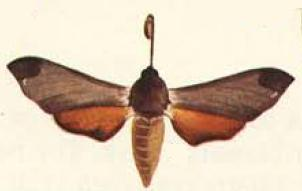
- Afroclanis calcareus

Scientific classification
- Domain: Eukaryota
- Kingdom: Animalia
- Phylum: Arthropoda
- Class: Insecta
- Order: Lepidoptera
- Family: Sphingidae
- Tribe: Smerinthini
- Genus: Afroclanis; Carcasson, 1968

= Afroclanis =

Genus of moths

Afroclanis is a genus of moths in the family Sphingidae. The genus was erected by Robert Herbert Carcasson in 1968.

== Species ==
- Afroclanis calcareus (Rothschild & Jordan 1907)
- Afroclanis neavi (Hampson 1910)
