= Pseudlepista atriceps =

Scientific classification
- Domain: Eukaryota
- Kingdom: Animalia
- Phylum: Arthropoda
- Class: Insecta
- Order: Lepidoptera
- Superfamily: Noctuoidea
- Family: Erebidae
- Subfamily: Arctiinae
- Genus: Pseudlepista
- Species: P. atriceps

Binomial name
- Pseudlepista atriceps Aurivillius, 1921

Species of moth

Pseudlepista atriceps is a moth in the subfamily Arctiinae. It was described by Per Olof Christopher Aurivillius in 1921 and is found in Kenya.
