= Eyralpenus kovtunovitchi =

Scientific classification
- Kingdom: Animalia
- Phylum: Arthropoda
- Clade: Pancrustacea
- Class: Insecta
- Order: Lepidoptera
- Superfamily: Noctuoidea
- Family: Erebidae
- Subfamily: Arctiinae
- Genus: Eyralpenus
- Species: E. kovtunovitchi

Binomial name
- Eyralpenus kovtunovitchi Dubatolov, 2011

Species of moth

Eyralpenus kovtunovitchi is a moth of the family Erebidae. It was described by Vladimir Viktorovitch Dubatolov in 2011. It is found in Malawi.
