= Pseudlepista holoxantha =

Scientific classification
- Kingdom: Animalia
- Phylum: Arthropoda
- Class: Insecta
- Order: Lepidoptera
- Superfamily: Noctuoidea
- Family: Erebidae
- Subfamily: Arctiinae
- Genus: Pseudlepista
- Species: P. holoxantha

Binomial name
- Pseudlepista holoxantha Hampson, 1918

Synonyms
- Charitilema holoxantha (Hampson, 1918)

Species of moth

Pseudlepista holoxantha is a moth in the subfamily Arctiinae. It was described by George Hampson in 1918. It is found in Angola, Kenya and Malawi.
