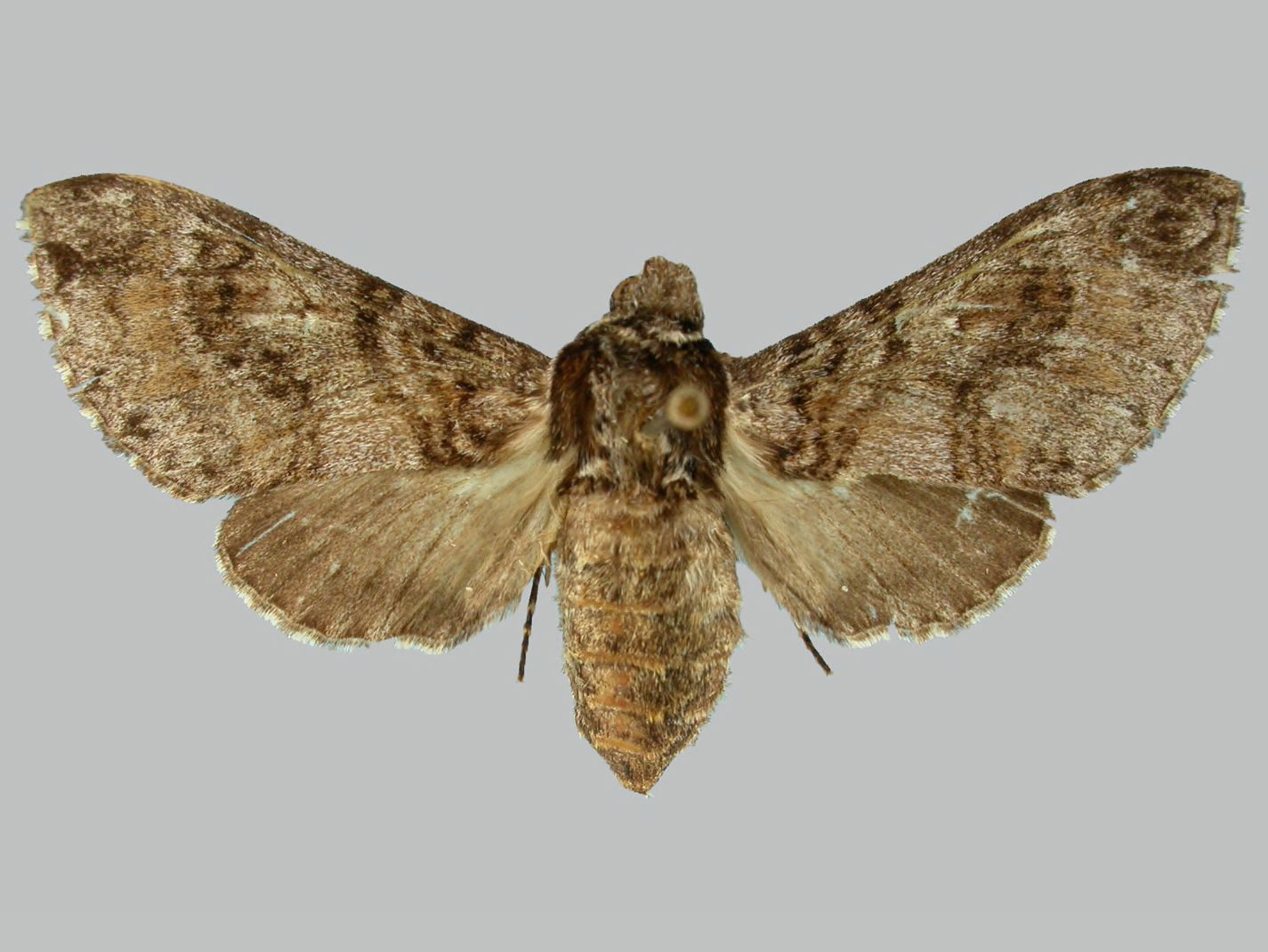
- Praedora marshalli

Scientific classification
- Domain: Eukaryota
- Kingdom: Animalia
- Phylum: Arthropoda
- Class: Insecta
- Order: Lepidoptera
- Family: Sphingidae
- Tribe: Sphingini
- Genus: Praedora; Rothschild & Jordan, 1903

= Praedora =

Genus of moths

Praedora is a genus of moths in the family Sphingidae. The genus was erected by Walter Rothschild and Karl Jordan in 1903.

== Species ==
- Praedora leucophaea Rothschild & Jordan, 1903
- Praedora marshalli Rothschild & Jordan, 1903
- Praedora plagiata Rothschild & Jordan, 1903
- Praedora puchneri Pierre & Schmit, 2008
- Praedora tropicalis Rothschild & Jordan, 1912
