= Homogyna pythes =

Scientific classification
- Domain: Eukaryota
- Kingdom: Animalia
- Phylum: Arthropoda
- Class: Insecta
- Order: Lepidoptera
- Family: Sesiidae
- Genus: Homogyna
- Species: H. pythes

Binomial name
- Homogyna pythes (H. Druce, 1899)

Synonyms
- Aegeria pythes H. Druce, 1899; Paranthrene pythes

Species of moth

Homogyna pythes is a moth of the family Sesiidae first described by Herbert Druce in 1899. It is known from South Africa.
