= Pseudoradiarctia rhodesiana =

Scientific classification
- Kingdom: Animalia
- Phylum: Arthropoda
- Class: Insecta
- Order: Lepidoptera
- Superfamily: Noctuoidea
- Family: Erebidae
- Subfamily: Arctiinae
- Genus: Pseudoradiarctia
- Species: P. rhodesiana

Binomial name
- Pseudoradiarctia rhodesiana (Hampson, 1900)

Synonyms
- Diacrisia rhodesiana Hampson, 1900; Spilosoma angolensis Bartel, 1903

Species of moth

Pseudoradiarctia rhodesiana is a moth in the family Erebidae. It was described by George Hampson in 1900. It is found in Angola, the Democratic Republic of the Congo, Kenya, Malawi, Rwanda, South Africa, Tanzania, Uganda and Zimbabwe.
