= Anaphosia aurantiaca =

Scientific classification
- Kingdom: Animalia
- Phylum: Arthropoda
- Class: Insecta
- Order: Lepidoptera
- Superfamily: Noctuoidea
- Family: Erebidae
- Subfamily: Arctiinae
- Genus: Anaphosia
- Species: A. aurantiaca

Binomial name
- Anaphosia aurantiaca Hampson, 1909

Synonyms
- Carcinopodia aurantiaca (Hampson, 1909)

Species of moth

Anaphosia aurantiaca is a moth of the subfamily Arctiinae. It was described by George Hampson in 1909. It is found in South Africa.
