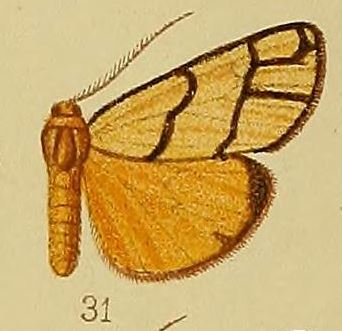
- Anaphosia pectinata

Scientific classification
- Kingdom: Animalia
- Phylum: Arthropoda
- Class: Insecta
- Order: Lepidoptera
- Superfamily: Noctuoidea
- Family: Erebidae
- Subfamily: Arctiinae
- Tribe: Lithosiini
- Genus: Anaphosia; Hampson, 1903

= Anaphosia =

Genus of moths

Anaphosia is a genus of moths in the family Erebidae. The genus was erected by George Hampson in 1903.

== Species ==
- Anaphosia astrigata Hampson, 1910
- Anaphosia aurantiaca Hampson, 1909
- Anaphosia caloxantha Hering, 1932
- Anaphosia cyanogramma Hampson, 1903
- Anaphosia eurygrapha Hampson, 1910
- Anaphosia extranea Debauche, 1938
- Anaphosia mirabilis Bartel, 1903
- Anaphosia parallela Bethune-Baker, 1911
- Anaphosia pectinata Hampson, 1910
