= Homogyna endopyra =

Scientific classification
- Kingdom: Animalia
- Phylum: Arthropoda
- Class: Insecta
- Order: Lepidoptera
- Family: Sesiidae
- Genus: Homogyna
- Species: H. endopyra

Binomial name
- Homogyna endopyra (Hampson, 1910)

Synonyms
- Tinthia endopyra Hampson, 1910

Species of moth

Homogyna endopyra is a moth of the family Sesiidae. It is known from South Africa.
