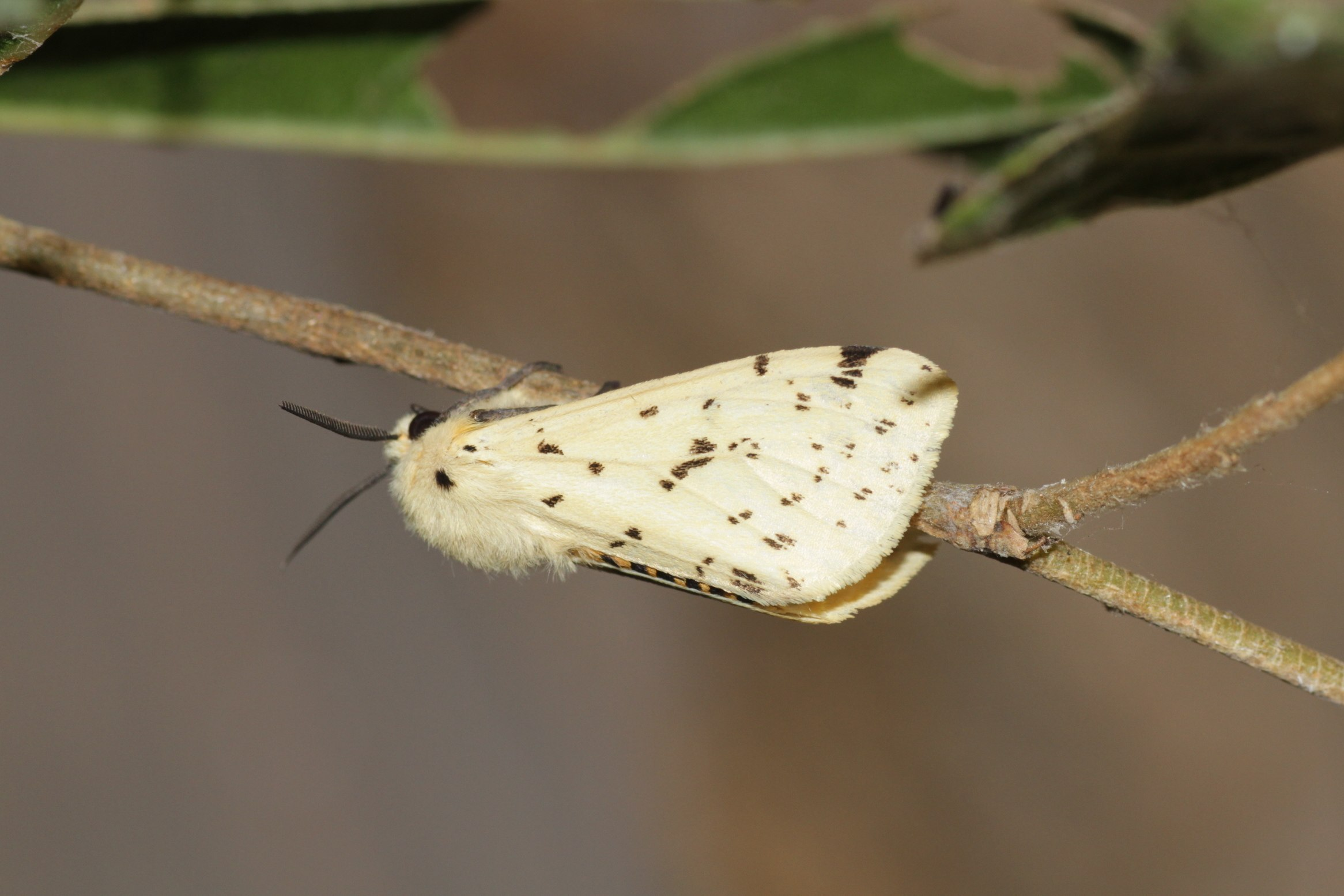

Scientific classification
- Domain: Eukaryota
- Kingdom: Animalia
- Phylum: Arthropoda
- Class: Insecta
- Order: Lepidoptera
- Superfamily: Noctuoidea
- Family: Erebidae
- Subfamily: Arctiinae
- Genus: Eyralpenus
- Species: E. sublutea

Binomial name
- Eyralpenus sublutea (Bartel, 1903)

Synonyms
- Spilosoma sublutea Bartel, 1903

= Eyralpenus sublutea =

Species of moth

Eyralpenus sublutea is a moth of the family Erebidae. It was described by Max Bartel in 1903. It is found in South Africa and Tanzania.

The larvae feed on Acalypha and Morus species.
