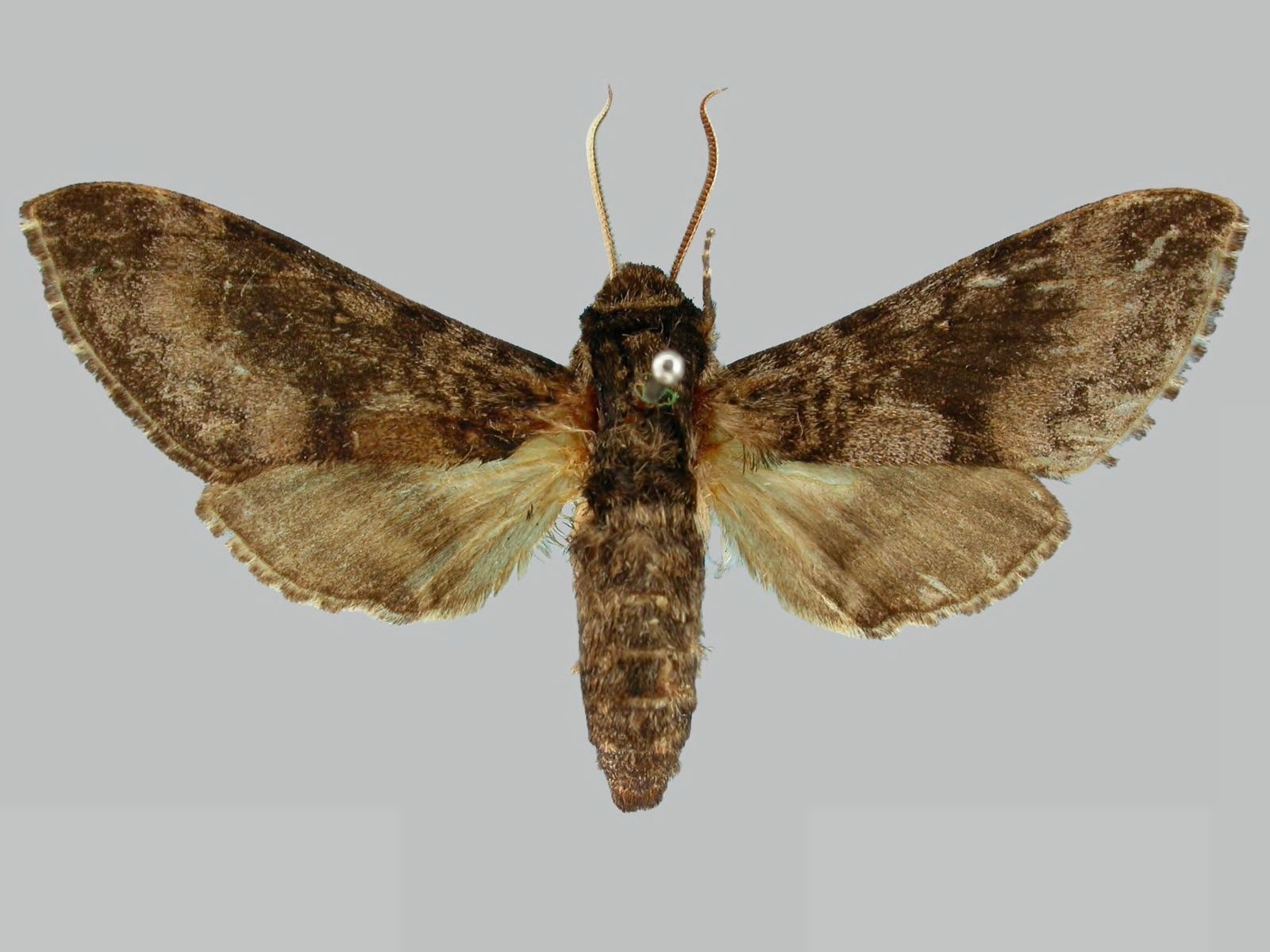
- Praedora tropicalis, male, upperside. Uganda

Scientific classification
- Domain: Eukaryota
- Kingdom: Animalia
- Phylum: Arthropoda
- Class: Insecta
- Order: Lepidoptera
- Family: Sphingidae
- Genus: Praedora
- Species: P. tropicalis

Binomial name
- Praedora tropicalis Rothschild & Jordan, 1912

= Praedora tropicalis =

Species of moth

Praedora tropicalis is a moth of the family Sphingidae. It is known from savanna and bush from Zambia to Uganda and Kenya.

The length of the forewings is 19–24 mm.
