= Anaphosia cyanogramma =

Scientific classification
- Kingdom: Animalia
- Phylum: Arthropoda
- Class: Insecta
- Order: Lepidoptera
- Superfamily: Noctuoidea
- Family: Erebidae
- Subfamily: Arctiinae
- Genus: Anaphosia
- Species: A. cyanogramma

Binomial name
- Anaphosia cyanogramma Hampson, 1903

Species of moth

Anaphosia cyanogramma is a moth of the subfamily Arctiinae. It was described by George Hampson in 1903. It is found in the Republic of the Congo, the Democratic Republic of the Congo, Malawi and Zimbabwe.
