= Bergeria =

Scientific classification
- Kingdom: Animalia
- Phylum: Arthropoda
- Clade: Pancrustacea
- Class: Insecta
- Order: Lepidoptera
- Superfamily: Noctuoidea
- Family: Erebidae
- Subfamily: Arctiinae
- Tribe: Syntomini
- Genus: Bergeria; Kiriakoff, 1952

Genus of moths

Bergeria is a genus of moths in the family Erebidae, erected by Kiriakoff in 1952.

== Species ==
- Bergeria avellana Kiriakoff, 1957
- Bergeria bourgognei Kiriakoff, 1952
- Bergeria fletcheri Kiriakoff, 1957
- Bergeria haematochrysa Kiriakoff, 1952
- Bergeria octava Kiriakoff, 1961
- Bergeria ornata Kiriakoff, 1959
- Bergeria schoutedeni Kiriakoff, 1952
- Bergeria tamsi Kiriakoff, 1952
