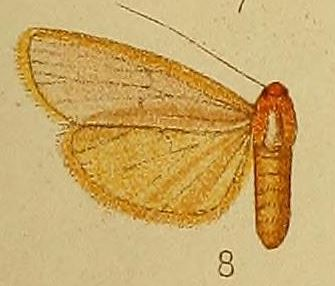

Scientific classification
- Kingdom: Animalia
- Phylum: Arthropoda
- Class: Insecta
- Order: Lepidoptera
- Superfamily: Noctuoidea
- Family: Erebidae
- Subfamily: Arctiinae
- Genus: Pseudlepista
- Species: P. flavicosta

Binomial name
- Pseudlepista flavicosta Hampson, 1910

= Pseudlepista flavicosta =

Species of moth

Pseudlepista flavicosta is a moth in the subfamily Arctiinae. It was described by George Hampson in 1910. It is found in the Democratic Republic of the Congo and Sierra Leone.
