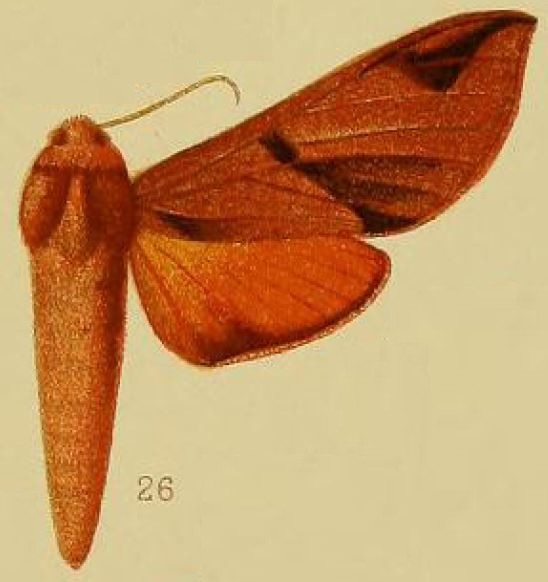

Scientific classification
- Domain: Eukaryota
- Kingdom: Animalia
- Phylum: Arthropoda
- Class: Insecta
- Order: Lepidoptera
- Family: Sphingidae
- Genus: Afroclanis
- Species: A. neavi

Binomial name
- Afroclanis neavi (Hampson, 1910)

Synonyms
- Polyptychus neavi Hampson, 1910; Polyptychus martha Closs, 1911

= Afroclanis neavi =

Species of moth

Afroclanis neavi is a moth of the family Sphingidae. It is known from savanna and woodland from Zimbabwe through Zambia to Tanzania.

The length of the forewings is 24–28 mm for males and 28–30 mm for females.
