= Eyralpenus postflavida =

Scientific classification
- Kingdom: Animalia
- Phylum: Arthropoda
- Class: Insecta
- Order: Lepidoptera
- Superfamily: Noctuoidea
- Family: Erebidae
- Subfamily: Arctiinae
- Genus: Eyralpenus
- Species: E. postflavida

Binomial name
- Eyralpenus postflavida (Rothschild, 1933)

Synonyms
- Spilosoma postflavida Rothschild, 1933

Species of moth

Eyralpenus postflavida is a moth of the family Erebidae. It was described by Rothschild in 1933. It is found in the Democratic Republic of Congo.
