= Paramelisa leroyi =

Scientific classification
- Domain: Eukaryota
- Kingdom: Animalia
- Phylum: Arthropoda
- Class: Insecta
- Order: Lepidoptera
- Superfamily: Noctuoidea
- Family: Erebidae
- Subfamily: Arctiinae
- Genus: Paramelisa
- Species: P. leroyi

Binomial name
- Paramelisa leroyi Kiriakoff, 1953

Species of moth

Paramelisa leroyi is a moth of the family Erebidae. It was described by Sergius G. Kiriakoff in 1953. It is found in the Democratic Republic of the Congo.
