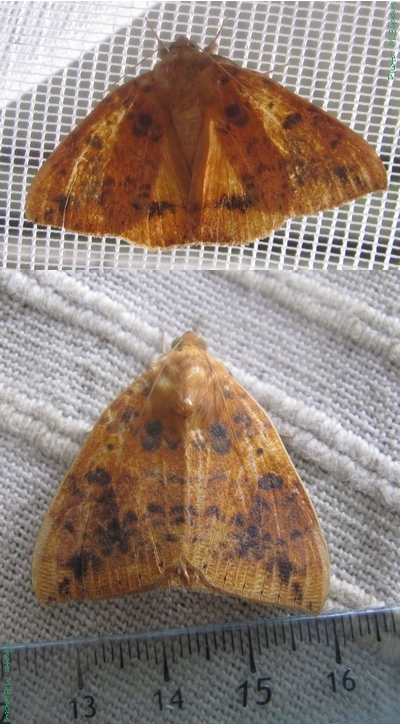

Scientific classification
- Kingdom: Animalia
- Phylum: Arthropoda
- Class: Insecta
- Order: Lepidoptera
- Superfamily: Noctuoidea
- Family: Noctuidae (?)
- Subfamily: Catocalinae
- Genus: Heliophisma; Hampson, 1913

= Heliophisma =

Genus of moths

Heliophisma is a genus of moths of the family Noctuidae.

== Species ==
- Heliophisma catocalina (Holland, 1894)
- Heliophisma klugii (Boisduval, 1833)
- Heliophisma xanthoptera (Hampson, 1910)
