= Homogyna pygmaea =

Scientific classification
- Domain: Eukaryota
- Kingdom: Animalia
- Phylum: Arthropoda
- Class: Insecta
- Order: Lepidoptera
- Family: Sesiidae
- Genus: Homogyna
- Species: H. pygmaea

Binomial name
- Homogyna pygmaea (Rebel, 1899)

Synonyms
- Sciapteron pygmaea Rebel, 1899

Species of moth

Homogyna pygmaea is a moth of the family Sesiidae. It is known from south-western Arabia.
