= Praedora puchneri =

Scientific classification
- Domain: Eukaryota
- Kingdom: Animalia
- Phylum: Arthropoda
- Class: Insecta
- Order: Lepidoptera
- Family: Sphingidae
- Genus: Praedora
- Species: P. puchneri

Binomial name
- Praedora puchneri Pierre & Schmit, 2008

Species of moth

Praedora puchneri is a moth of the family Sphingidae. It is known from the Democratic Republic of Congo.
