= Eyralpenus quadrilunata =

Scientific classification
- Kingdom: Animalia
- Phylum: Arthropoda
- Class: Insecta
- Order: Lepidoptera
- Superfamily: Noctuoidea
- Family: Erebidae
- Subfamily: Arctiinae
- Genus: Eyralpenus
- Species: E. quadrilunata

Binomial name
- Eyralpenus quadrilunata (Hampson, 1901)

Synonyms
- Diacrisia quadrilunata Hampson, 1901; Spilosoma quadrilunata

Species of moth

Eyralpenus quadrilunata is a moth of the family Erebidae. It was described by George Hampson in 1901. It is found in the Democratic Republic of the Congo, Ghana, Senegal, Sierra Leone and the Gambia.
