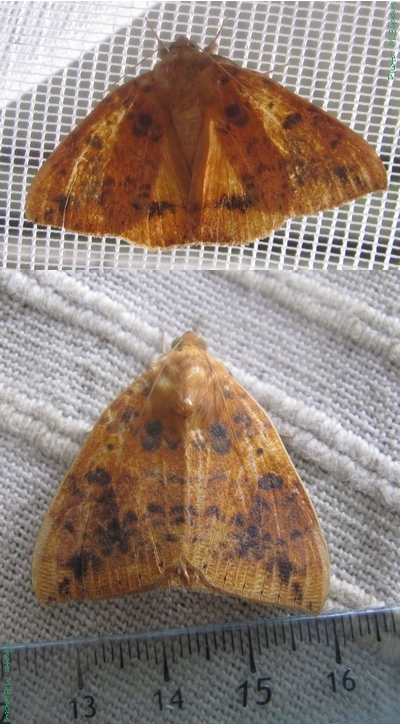

Scientific classification
- Domain: Eukaryota
- Kingdom: Animalia
- Phylum: Arthropoda
- Class: Insecta
- Order: Lepidoptera
- Superfamily: Noctuoidea
- Family: Noctuidae (?)
- Genus: Heliophisma
- Species: H. klugii

Binomial name
- Heliophisma klugii (Boisduval, 1833)

Synonyms
- Ophiusa klugii Boisduval, 1833; Heliophisma clugi Hampson, 1913; Heliophisma croceipennis (Walker, 1858); Ophiusa croceipennis Walker, 1858; Heliophisma rivularis (Butler, 1875); Ophisma rivularis Butler, 1875; Heliophisma varians (Mabille, 1897); Ophisma varians Mabille, 1897; Achaea klugii (Boisduval, 1833)

= Heliophisma klugii =

Species of moth

Heliophisma klugii is a species of moth of the family Noctuidae first described by Jean Baptiste Boisduval in 1833. It is found in Africa, including West Africa, Madagascar, Sierra Leone and South Africa.

This species has a wingspan of around 55–60 millimetres (2.2–2.4 in).
