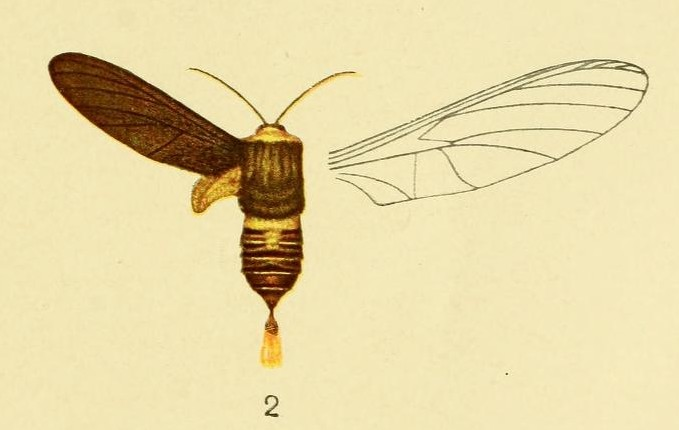

Scientific classification
- Kingdom: Animalia
- Phylum: Arthropoda
- Clade: Pancrustacea
- Class: Insecta
- Order: Lepidoptera
- Superfamily: Noctuoidea
- Family: Erebidae
- Subfamily: Arctiinae
- Genus: Paramelisa
- Species: P. lophura

Binomial name
- Paramelisa lophura Aurivillius, 1905

= Paramelisa lophura =

Species of moth

Paramelisa lophura is a moth of the family Erebidae. It was described by Per Olof Christopher Aurivillius in 1905 and is found in the Democratic Republic of the Congo, Gabon and Uganda.
