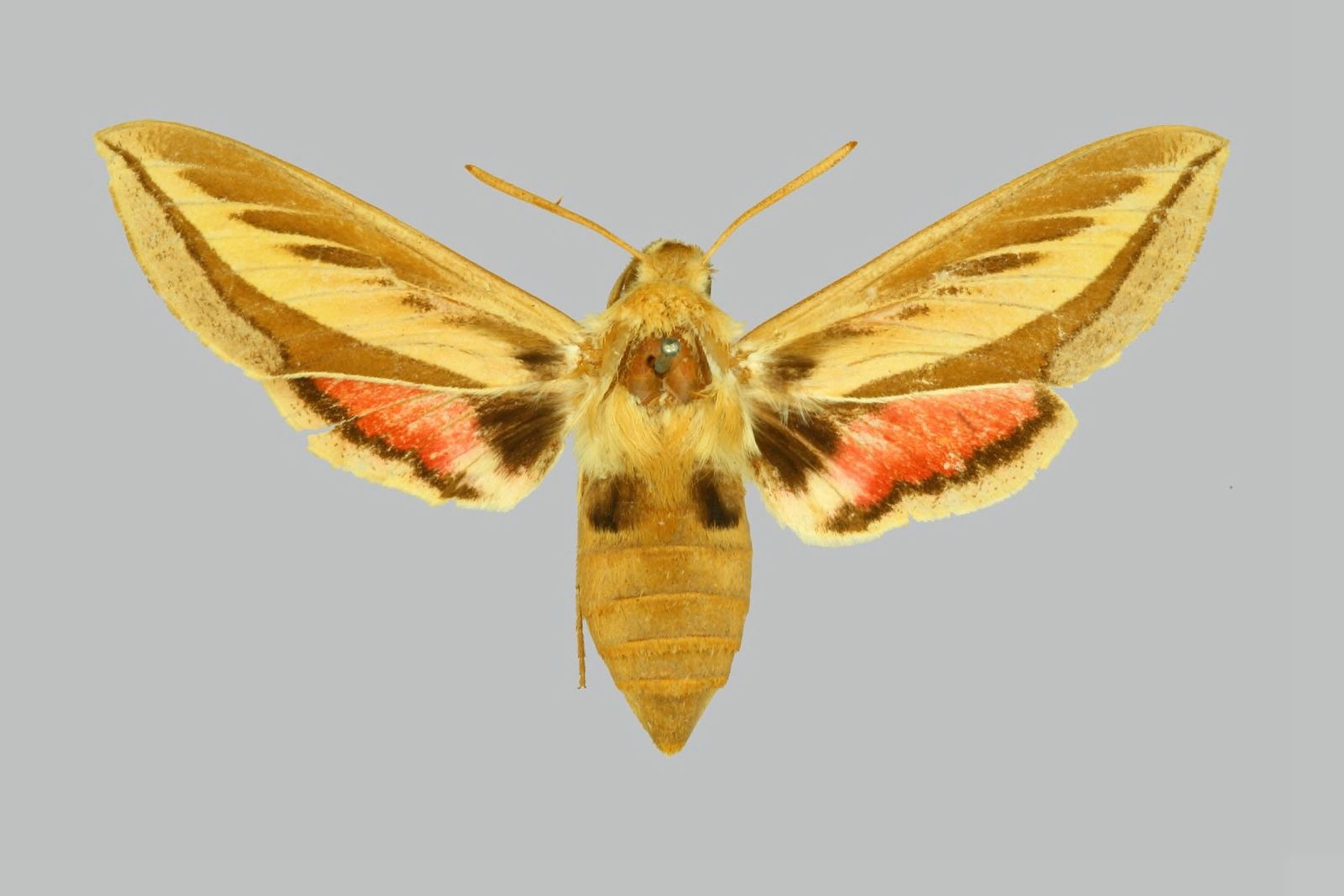
- Female specimen of Rhodafra opheltes

Scientific classification
- Kingdom: Animalia
- Phylum: Arthropoda
- Class: Insecta
- Order: Lepidoptera
- Family: Sphingidae
- Subtribe: Choerocampina
- Genus: Rhodafra; Rothschild & Jordan, 1903

Species
- See text

= Rhodafra =

Genus of moths

Rhodafra is a genus of moths in the family Sphingidae.

== Species ==
- Rhodafra marshalli Rothschild & Jordan1903
- Rhodafra opheltes (Cramer, 1780)
