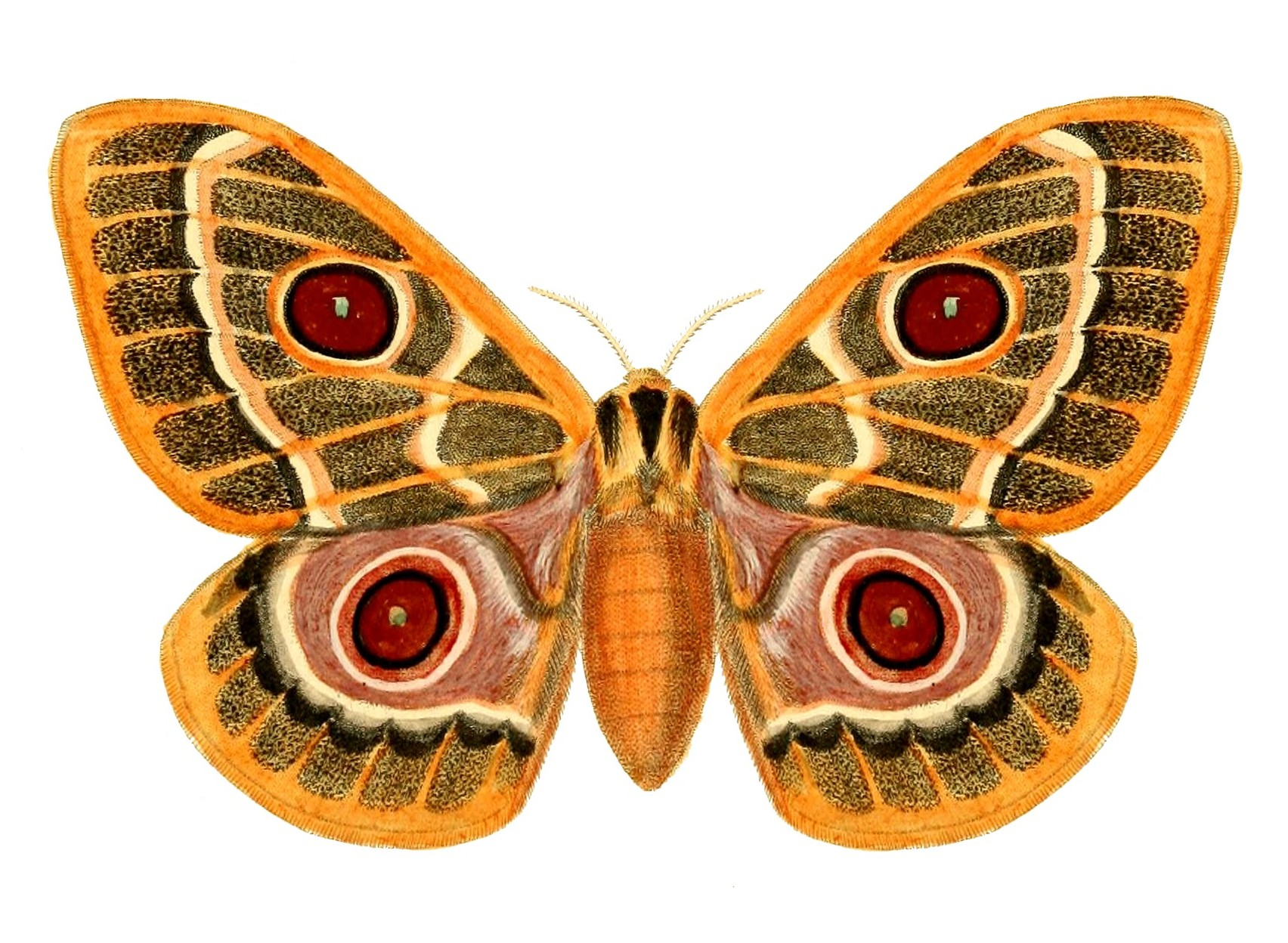

Scientific classification
- Domain: Eukaryota
- Kingdom: Animalia
- Phylum: Arthropoda
- Class: Insecta
- Order: Lepidoptera
- Family: Saturniidae
- Genus: Bunaeopsis
- Species: B. zaddachi

Binomial name
- Bunaeopsis zaddachi (Dewitz, 1879)

Synonyms
- Saturnia zaddachii Dewitz, 1879; Bunaeopsis zaddachii

= Bunaeopsis zaddachi =

Species of moth

Bunaeopsis zaddachi, or Zaddachi's emperor moth, is a moth of the family Saturniidae. The species was first described by Hermann Dewitz in 1879. It is known from Africa, including Tanzania.
