= Paramelisa lophuroides =

Scientific classification
- Domain: Eukaryota
- Kingdom: Animalia
- Phylum: Arthropoda
- Class: Insecta
- Order: Lepidoptera
- Superfamily: Noctuoidea
- Family: Erebidae
- Subfamily: Arctiinae
- Genus: Paramelisa
- Species: P. lophuroides

Binomial name
- Paramelisa lophuroides Oberthür, 1911

Species of moth

Paramelisa lophuroides is a moth of the family Erebidae. It was described by Oberthür in 1911. It is found in Angola and Cameroon.
