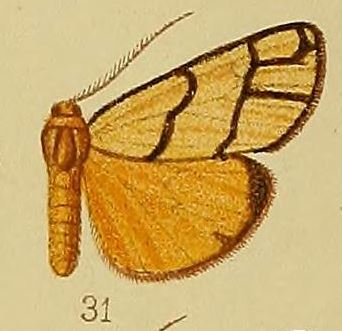

Scientific classification
- Kingdom: Animalia
- Phylum: Arthropoda
- Class: Insecta
- Order: Lepidoptera
- Superfamily: Noctuoidea
- Family: Erebidae
- Subfamily: Arctiinae
- Genus: Anaphosia
- Species: A. pectinata

Binomial name
- Anaphosia pectinata Hampson, 1910

Synonyms
- Habrosynilema pectinata (Hampson, 1910)

= Anaphosia pectinata =

Species of moth

Anaphosia pectinata is a moth of the subfamily Arctiinae. It was described by George Hampson in 1910. It is found in the Democratic Republic of the Congo.
