= Anaphosia parallela =

Scientific classification
- Kingdom: Animalia
- Phylum: Arthropoda
- Class: Insecta
- Order: Lepidoptera
- Superfamily: Noctuoidea
- Family: Erebidae
- Subfamily: Arctiinae
- Genus: Anaphosia
- Species: A. parallela

Binomial name
- Anaphosia parallela Bethune-Baker, 1911

Species of moth

Anaphosia parallela is a moth of the subfamily Arctiinae. It was described by George Thomas Bethune-Baker in 1911. It is found in Angola and the Democratic Republic of the Congo.
