= Homogyna alluaudi =

Scientific classification
- Domain: Eukaryota
- Kingdom: Animalia
- Phylum: Arthropoda
- Class: Insecta
- Order: Lepidoptera
- Family: Sesiidae
- Genus: Homogyna
- Species: H. alluaudi

Binomial name
- Homogyna alluaudi Le Cerf, 1911

Species of moth

Homogyna alluaudi is a moth of the family Sesiidae. It is known from Kenya.
