= Anaphosia extranea =

Scientific classification
- Kingdom: Animalia
- Phylum: Arthropoda
- Class: Insecta
- Order: Lepidoptera
- Superfamily: Noctuoidea
- Family: Erebidae
- Subfamily: Arctiinae
- Genus: Anaphosia
- Species: A. extranea

Binomial name
- Anaphosia extranea Debauche, 1938

Species of moth

Anaphosia extranea is a moth of the subfamily Arctiinae. It was described by Hubert Robert Debauche in 1938. It is found in the Democratic Republic of the Congo.
