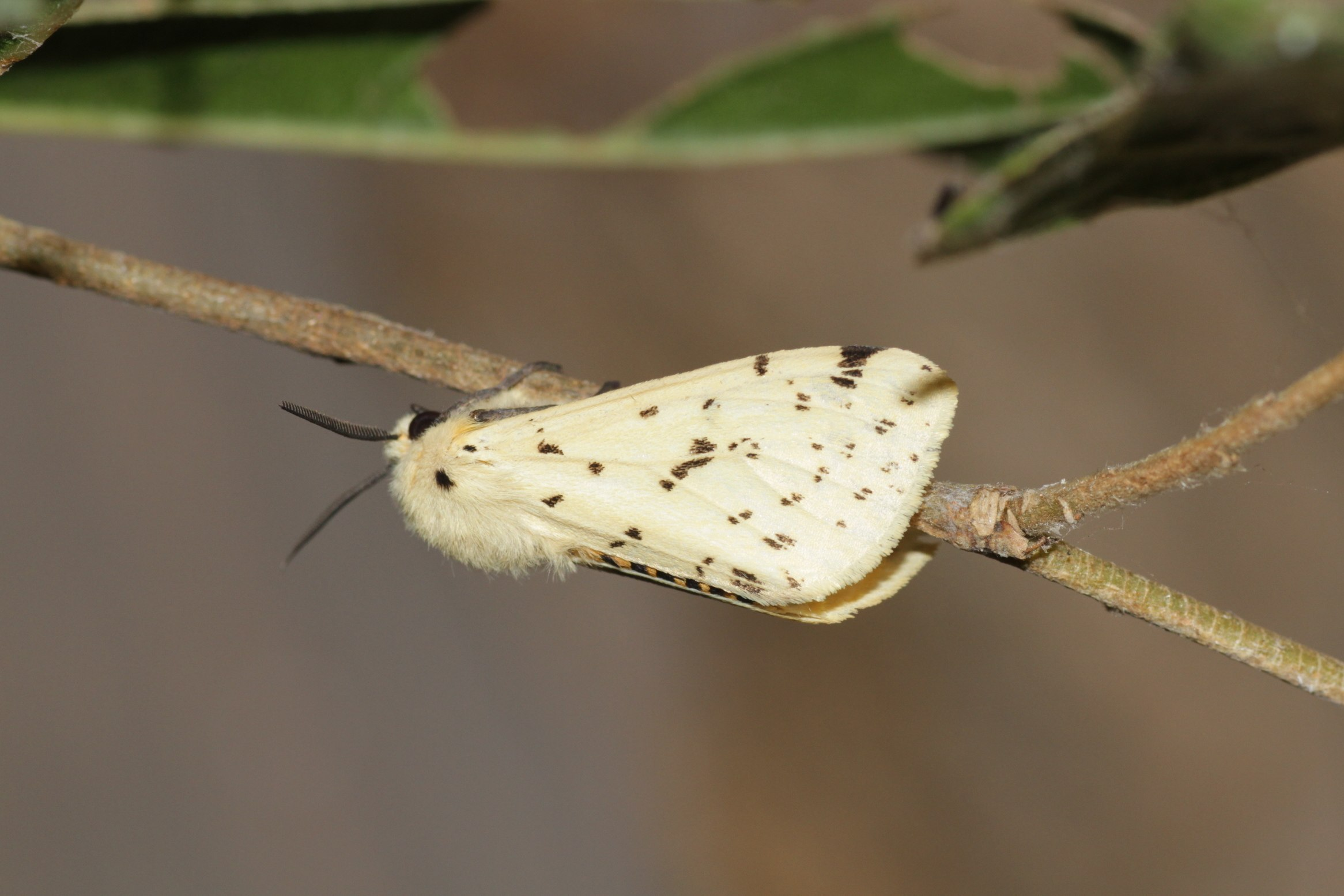
- Eyralpenus sublutea

Scientific classification
- Kingdom: Animalia
- Phylum: Arthropoda
- Class: Insecta
- Order: Lepidoptera
- Superfamily: Noctuoidea
- Family: Erebidae
- Subfamily: Arctiinae
- Subtribe: Spilosomina
- Genus: Eyralpenus; Butler, 1875

Type species
- Spilosoma testacea Walker, 1855

= Eyralpenus =

Genus of moths

Eyralpenus is a genus of tiger moths in the family Erebidae. The genus was erected by Arthur Gardiner Butler in 1875. The moths in the genus are found in the Afrotropics.

== Species ==
- Eyralpenus inconspicua (Rothschild, 1910)
- Eyralpenus kovtunovitchi Dubatolov, 2011
- Eyralpenus postflavida (Rothschild, 1933)
- Eyralpenus scioana (Oberthür, 1879 [1880])
  - Eyralpenus scioana intensa (Rothschild, 1910)
  - Eyralpenus scioana paucipunctata (Kiriakoff, 1963)
- Eyralpenus sublutea (Bartel, 1903)
- Eyralpenus testacea (Walker, 1855)
- Eyralpenus trifasciata (Holland, 1892)

=== Subgenus Pareyralpenus Dubatolov & Haynes, 2008 ===
- Eyralpenus diplosticta (Hampson, 1900)
- Eyralpenus meinhofi (Bartel, 1903)
- Eyralpenus quadrilunata (Hampson, 1901)
