= Pseudoradiarctia affinis =

Scientific classification
- Domain: Eukaryota
- Kingdom: Animalia
- Phylum: Arthropoda
- Class: Insecta
- Order: Lepidoptera
- Superfamily: Noctuoidea
- Family: Erebidae
- Subfamily: Arctiinae
- Genus: Pseudoradiarctia
- Species: P. affinis

Binomial name
- Pseudoradiarctia affinis (Bartel, 1903)

Synonyms
- Spilosoma affinis Bartel, 1903

Species of moth

Pseudoradiarctia affinis is a moth in the family Erebidae. It was described by Max Bartel in 1903. It is found in Ghana, Sierra Leone and Tanzania.
