= Eyralpenus inconspicua =

Scientific classification
- Domain: Eukaryota
- Kingdom: Animalia
- Phylum: Arthropoda
- Class: Insecta
- Order: Lepidoptera
- Superfamily: Noctuoidea
- Family: Erebidae
- Subfamily: Arctiinae
- Genus: Eyralpenus
- Species: E. inconspicua

Binomial name
- Eyralpenus inconspicua (Rothschild, 1910)

Synonyms
- Diacrisia inconspicua Rothschild, 1910

Species of moth

Eyralpenus inconspicua is a moth of the family Erebidae. It was described by Rothschild in 1910. It is found in Angola, Malawi and Tanzania.
