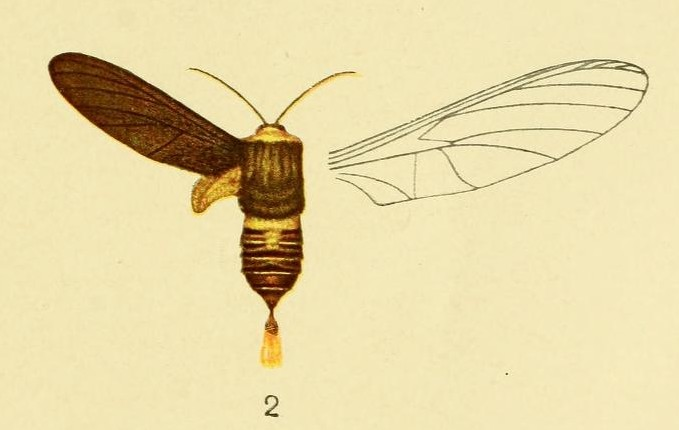
- Paramelisa lophura

Scientific classification
- Domain: Eukaryota
- Kingdom: Animalia
- Phylum: Arthropoda
- Class: Insecta
- Order: Lepidoptera
- Superfamily: Noctuoidea
- Family: Erebidae
- Subfamily: Arctiinae
- Tribe: Syntomini
- Genus: Paramelisa; Aurivillius, 1905

= Paramelisa =

Genus of moths

Paramelisa is a genus of moths in the family Erebidae.

== Species ==
- Paramelisa dollmani Hampson, 1920
- Paramelisa leroyi Kiriakoff, 1953
- Paramelisa lophura Aurivillius, 1905
- Paramelisa lophuroides Oberthür, 1911

== Former species ==
- Paramelisa bitjeana Bethune-Baker, 1927
