= Homogyna sanguipennis =

Scientific classification
- Kingdom: Animalia
- Phylum: Arthropoda
- Clade: Pancrustacea
- Class: Insecta
- Order: Lepidoptera
- Family: Sesiidae
- Genus: Homogyna
- Species: H. sanguipennis

Binomial name
- Homogyna sanguipennis (Meyrick, 1926)

Synonyms
- Paranthrene sanguipennis Meyrick, 1926

Species of moth

Homogyna sanguipennis is a moth of the family Sesiidae. It is most commonly found in Southern Africa.
