= Eyralpenus trifasciata =

Scientific classification
- Kingdom: Animalia
- Phylum: Arthropoda
- Class: Insecta
- Order: Lepidoptera
- Superfamily: Noctuoidea
- Family: Erebidae
- Subfamily: Arctiinae
- Genus: Eyralpenus
- Species: E. trifasciata

Binomial name
- Eyralpenus trifasciata (Holland, 1892)

Synonyms
- Alpenus trifasciata John, 1892

Species of moth

Eyralpenus trifasciata is a moth of the family Erebidae. It was described by William Jacob Holland in 1892. It is found in Tanzania.
