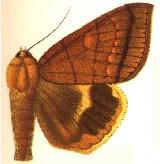
- Male
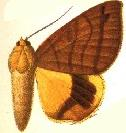
- Female

Scientific classification
- Domain: Eukaryota
- Kingdom: Animalia
- Phylum: Arthropoda
- Class: Insecta
- Order: Lepidoptera
- Superfamily: Noctuoidea
- Family: Noctuidae (?)
- Genus: Heliophisma
- Species: H. catocalina

Binomial name
- Heliophisma catocalina (Holland, 1894)

Synonyms
- Ophiodes catocalina Holland, 1894; Heliophisma zanzibarica Hampson, 1913

= Heliophisma catocalina =

Species of moth

Heliophisma catocalina is a species of moth of the family Noctuidae first described by William Jacob Holland in 1894. It is found in Gabon, Ghana, Tanzania and Nigeria.
