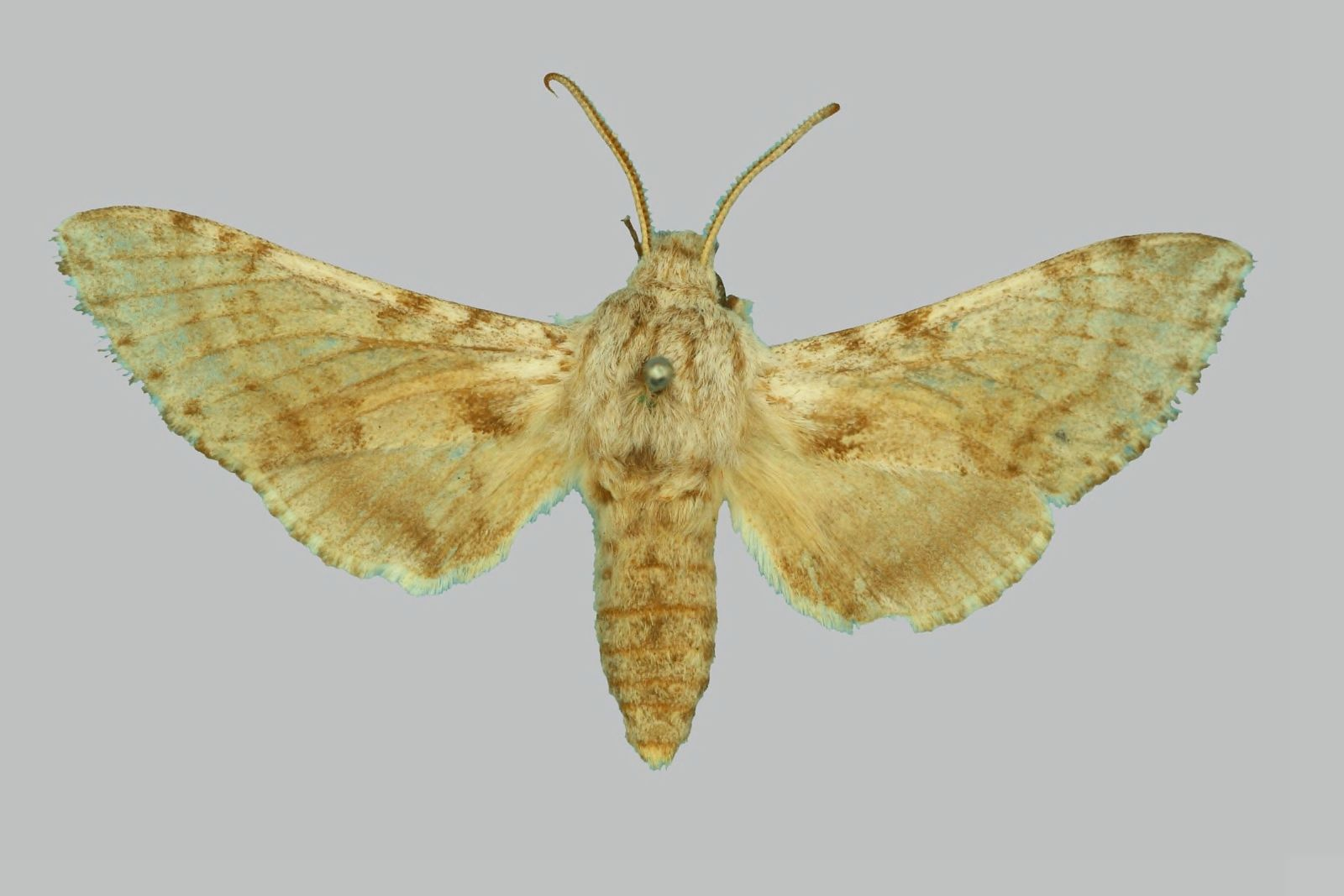
- Praedora leucophaea

Scientific classification
- Domain: Eukaryota
- Kingdom: Animalia
- Phylum: Arthropoda
- Class: Insecta
- Order: Lepidoptera
- Family: Sphingidae
- Genus: Praedora
- Species: P. leucophaea

Binomial name
- Praedora leucophaea Rothschild & Jordan, 1903

= Praedora leucophaea =

Species of moth

Praedora leucophaea is a moth of the family Sphingidae. It is known from dry bush areas from northern South Africa to Kenya.

The length of the forewings is 20–21 mm.
