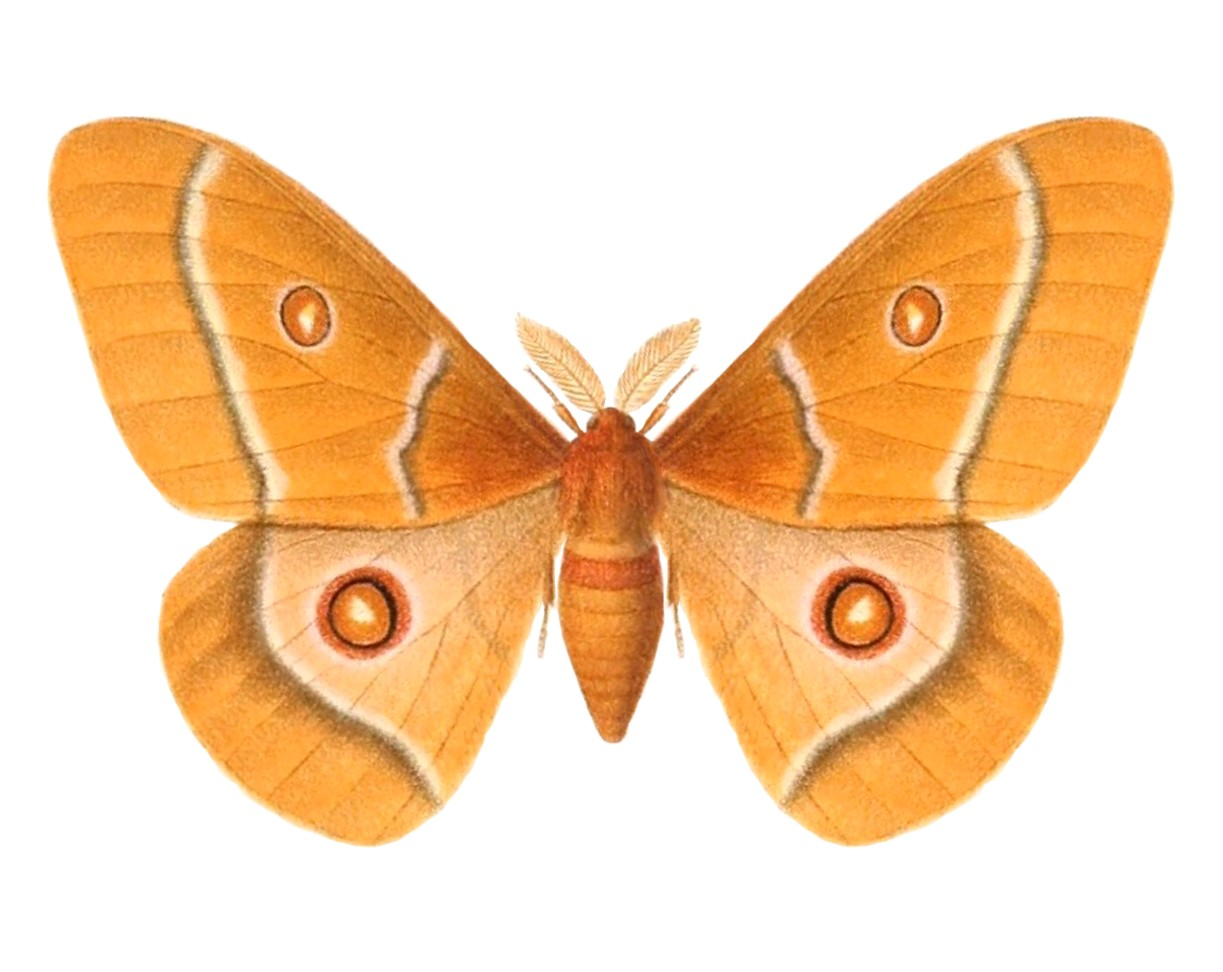

Scientific classification
- Domain: Eukaryota
- Kingdom: Animalia
- Phylum: Arthropoda
- Class: Insecta
- Order: Lepidoptera
- Family: Saturniidae
- Genus: Bunaeopsis
- Species: B. aurantiaca

Binomial name
- Bunaeopsis aurantiaca (Rothschild, 1895)

= Bunaeopsis aurantiaca =

Species of insect

Bunaeopsis aurantiaca is a species of moth in the family Saturniidae.

== Distribution ==
Bunaeopsis aurantiaca occurs in Central Africa.
