= Homogyna ignivittata =

Scientific classification
- Kingdom: Animalia
- Phylum: Arthropoda
- Clade: Pancrustacea
- Class: Insecta
- Order: Lepidoptera
- Family: Sesiidae
- Genus: Homogyna
- Species: H. ignivittata

Binomial name
- Homogyna ignivittata Hampson, 1919

Species of moth

Homogyna ignivittata is a moth of the family Sesiidae. It is found in Mpumalanga, South Africa.
