= Anaphosia mirabilis =

Scientific classification
- Domain: Eukaryota
- Kingdom: Animalia
- Phylum: Arthropoda
- Class: Insecta
- Order: Lepidoptera
- Superfamily: Noctuoidea
- Family: Erebidae
- Subfamily: Arctiinae
- Genus: Anaphosia
- Species: A. mirabilis

Binomial name
- Anaphosia mirabilis (Bartel, 1903)

Synonyms
- Teracotona mirabilis Bartel, 1903

Species of moth

Anaphosia mirabilis is a moth of the subfamily Arctiinae. It was described by Max Bartel in 1903. It is found in Kenya and Malawi.
