= Pseudoradiarctia tanzanica =

Scientific classification
- Domain: Eukaryota
- Kingdom: Animalia
- Phylum: Arthropoda
- Class: Insecta
- Order: Lepidoptera
- Superfamily: Noctuoidea
- Family: Erebidae
- Subfamily: Arctiinae
- Genus: Pseudoradiarctia
- Species: P. tanzanica

Binomial name
- Pseudoradiarctia tanzanica Haynes, 2011

Species of moth

Pseudoradiarctia tanzanica is a moth in the family Erebidae. It was described by Patrick G. Haynes in 2011. It is found in Tanzania.
