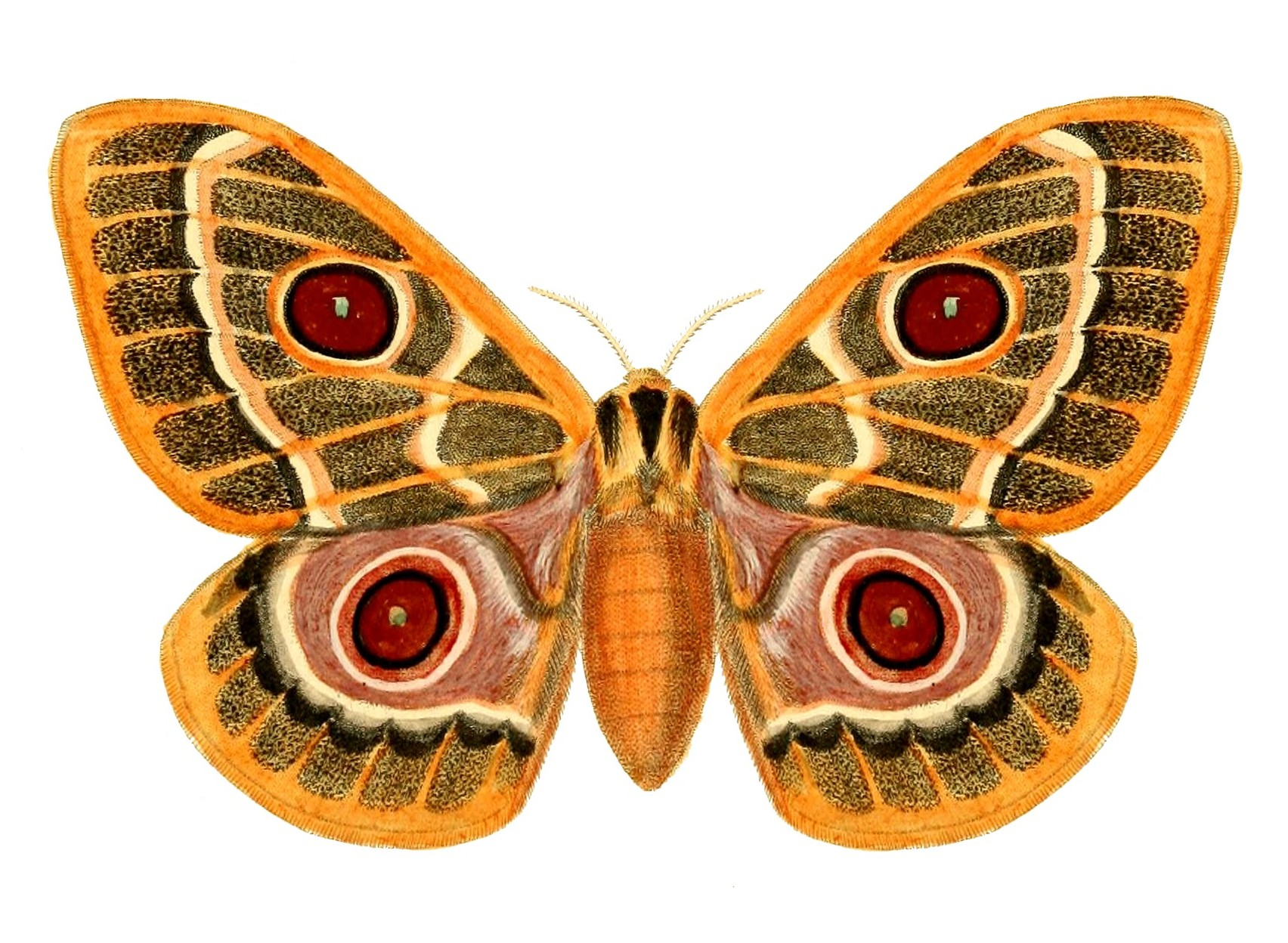

Scientific classification
- Domain: Eukaryota
- Kingdom: Animalia
- Phylum: Arthropoda
- Class: Insecta
- Order: Lepidoptera
- Family: Saturniidae
- Subfamily: Saturniinae
- Genus: Bunaeopsis; Bouvier, 1927

= Bunaeopsis =

Genus of moths

Bunaeopsis is a genus of moths in the family Saturniidae. The genus was erected by Eugène Louis Bouvier in 1927.

== Species ==
- Bunaeopsis angolana (Le Cerf, 1918)
- Bunaeopsis annabellae Lemaire & Rougeot, 1975
- Bunaeopsis arabella (Aurivillius, 1893)
- Bunaeopsis aurantiaca (Rothschild, 1895)
- Bunaeopsis bomfordi Pinhey, 1962
- Bunaeopsis chromata Darge, 2003
- Bunaeopsis clementi Lemaire & Rougeot, 1975
- Bunaeopsis ferruginea (Bouvier, 1927)
- Bunaeopsis fervida Darge, 2003
- Bunaeopsis francottei Darge, 1992
- Bunaeopsis hersilia (Westwood, 1849)
- Bunaeopsis jacksoni (Jordan, 1908)
- Bunaeopsis licharbas (Maassen & Weyding, 1885)
- Bunaeopsis lueboensis Bouvier, 1931
- Bunaeopsis maasseni (Strand, 1911)
- Bunaeopsis macrophthalma (Kirby, 1881)
- Bunaeopsis oubie (Guerin-Meneville, 1849)
- Bunaeopsis phidias (Weymer, 1909)
- Bunaeopsis princeps (Le Cerf, 1918)
- Bunaeopsis rothschildi (Le Cerf, 1911)
- Bunaeopsis saffronica Pinhey, 1972
- Bunaeopsis scheveniana Lemaire & Rougeot, 1974
- Bunaeopsis schoenheiti (Wichgraff, 1914)
- Bunaeopsis terrali Darge, 1993
- Bunaeopsis thyene (Weymer, 1896)
- Bunaeopsis vau (Fawcett, 1915)
- Bunaeopsis zaddachi (Dewitz, 1879)
