= Pseudoradiarctia =

- Pseudoradiarctia scita

Scientific classification
- Kingdom: Animalia
- Phylum: Arthropoda
- Clade: Pancrustacea
- Class: Insecta
- Order: Lepidoptera
- Superfamily: Noctuoidea
- Family: Erebidae
- Subfamily: Arctiinae
- Subtribe: Spilosomina
- Genus: Pseudoradiarctia; Haynes, 2011

Type species
- Diacrisia rhodesiana Hampson, 1900

Genus of moths

Pseudoradiarctia is a genus of moths in the family Erebidae from Afrotropics.

== Species ==
- Pseudoradiarctia affinis (Bartel, 1903)
- Pseudoradiarctia lentifasciata (Hampson, 1916)
- Pseudoradiarctia pallida Haynes, 2011
- Pseudoradiarctia parva Haynes, 2011
- Pseudoradiarctia rhodesiana (Hampson, 1900)
- Pseudoradiarctia scita (Walker, [1865])
- Pseudoradiarctia tanzanica Haynes, 2011
