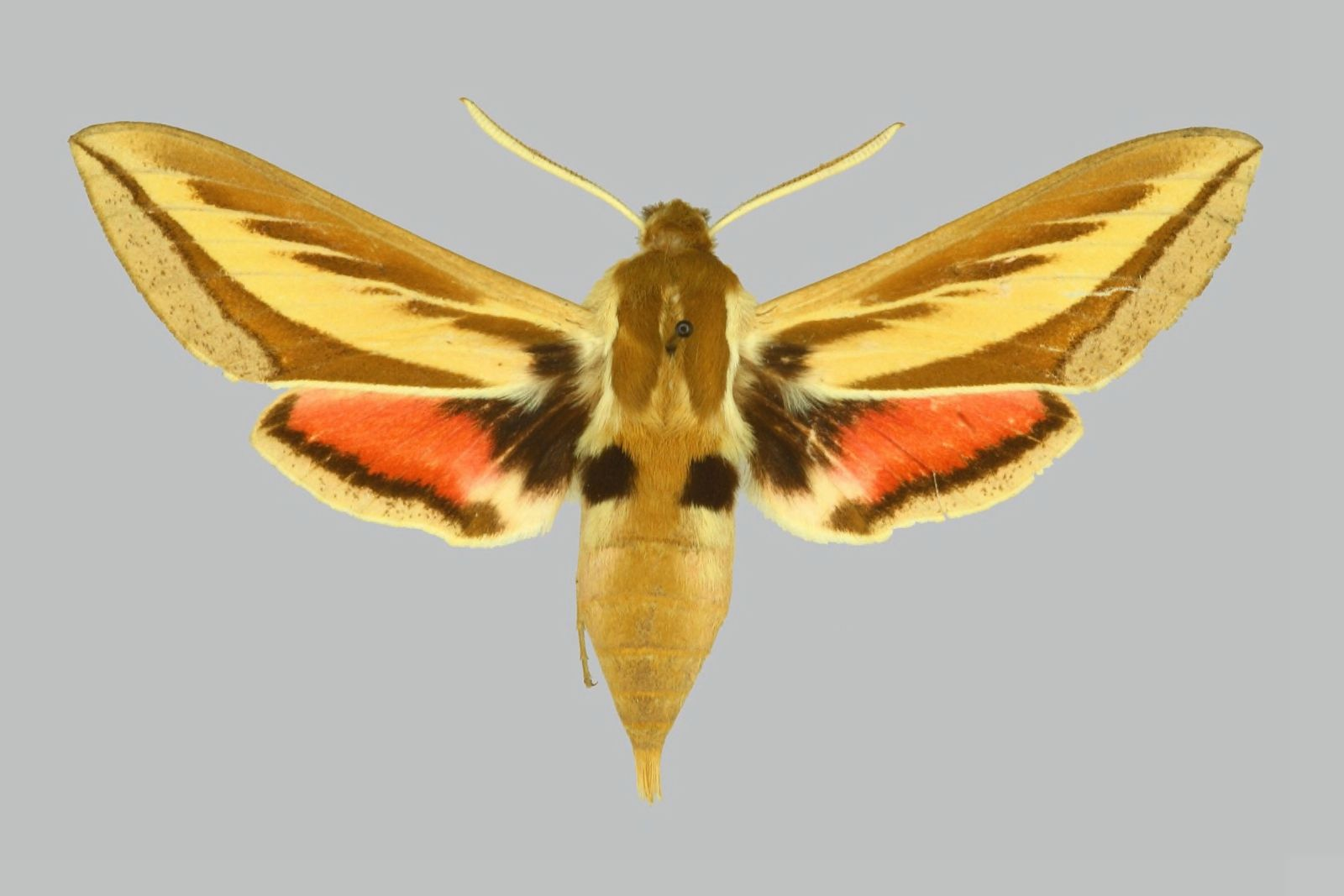

Scientific classification
- Domain: Eukaryota
- Kingdom: Animalia
- Phylum: Arthropoda
- Class: Insecta
- Order: Lepidoptera
- Family: Sphingidae
- Genus: Rhodafra
- Species: R. opheltes

Binomial name
- Rhodafra opheltes (Cramer, 1780)

Synonyms
- Sphinx opheltes Cramer, 1780; Deilephila mariae Wallengren, 1875

= Rhodafra opheltes =

Species of moth

Rhodafra opheltes is a moth of the family Sphingidae. It is known from South Africa.

It is similar to Hyles species, but immediately distinguishable by the characteristic crest on the second segment of the labial palps and the single pair of subdorsal black spots on abdominal segment two. The hindwing upperside is similar to Hyles euphorbiae euphorbiae but the black basal area is less extensive along the costa. The hindwing underside anal area is black basally.
