= Anaphosia caloxantha =

Scientific classification
- Kingdom: Animalia
- Phylum: Arthropoda
- Class: Insecta
- Order: Lepidoptera
- Superfamily: Noctuoidea
- Family: Erebidae
- Subfamily: Arctiinae
- Genus: Anaphosia
- Species: A. caloxantha

Binomial name
- Anaphosia caloxantha Hering, 1932

Species of moth

Anaphosia caloxantha is a moth of the subfamily Arctiinae. It was described by Hering in 1932. It is found in the Democratic Republic of Congo.
