= Bergeria avellana =

Scientific classification
- Kingdom: Animalia
- Phylum: Arthropoda
- Clade: Pancrustacea
- Class: Insecta
- Order: Lepidoptera
- Superfamily: Noctuoidea
- Family: Erebidae
- Subfamily: Arctiinae
- Genus: Bergeria
- Species: B. avellana

Binomial name
- Bergeria avellana Kiriakoff, 1957

Synonyms
- Lempkeella avellana (Kiriakoff, 1957)

Species of moth

Bergeria avellana is a moth of the subfamily Arctiinae. It was described by Sergius G. Kiriakoff in 1957. It is found in the Democratic Republic of the Congo.
