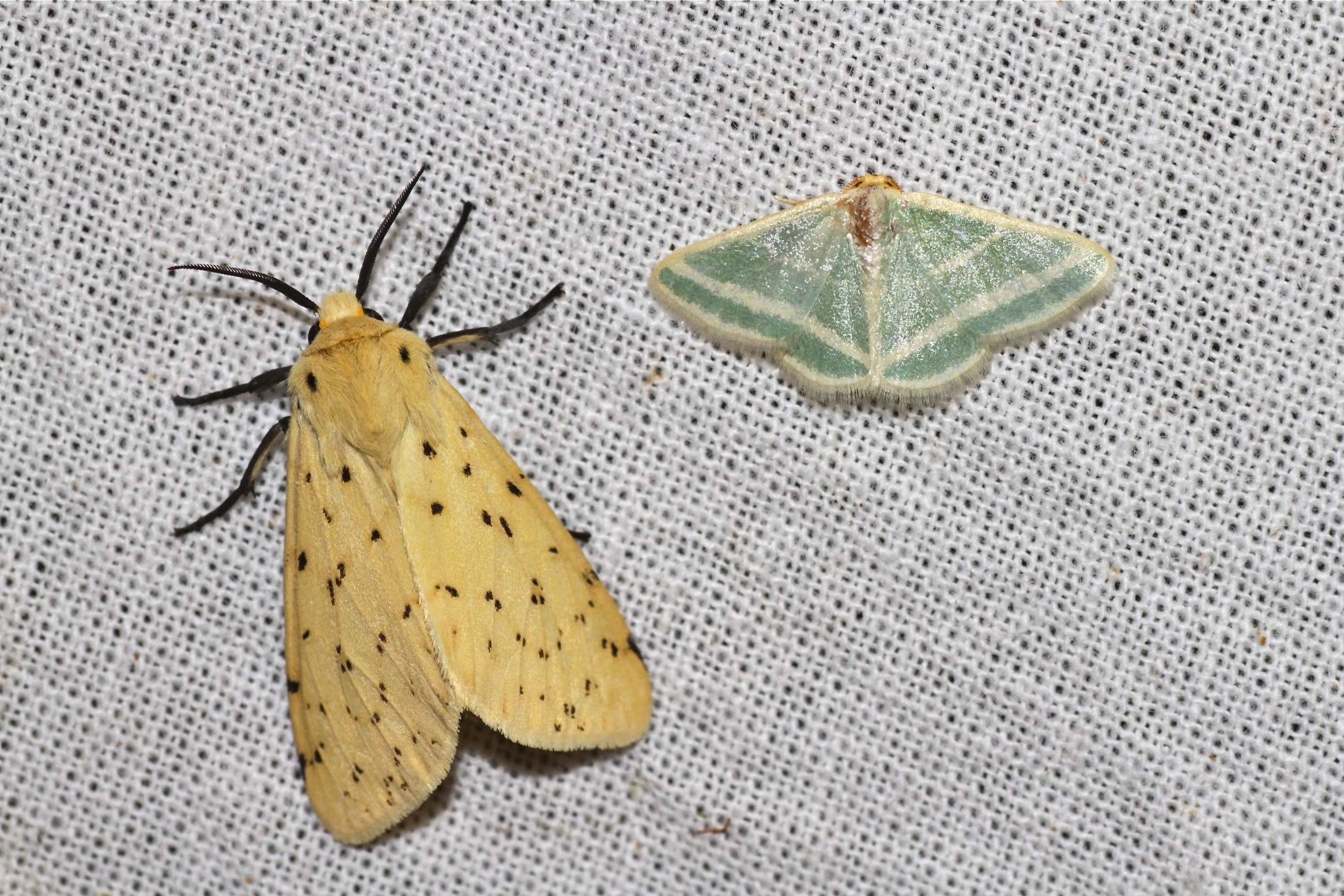

Scientific classification
- Kingdom: Animalia
- Phylum: Arthropoda
- Class: Insecta
- Order: Lepidoptera
- Superfamily: Noctuoidea
- Family: Erebidae
- Subfamily: Arctiinae
- Genus: Eyralpenus
- Species: E. testacea

Binomial name
- Eyralpenus testacea (Walker, 1855)

Synonyms
- Spilosoma testacea Walker, 1855; Spilosoma subflavescens Walker, 1865

= Eyralpenus testacea =

Species of moth

Eyralpenus testacea is a moth of the family Erebidae. It was described by Francis Walker in 1855. It is found in the Democratic Republic of the Congo and South Africa.
