= Homogyna =

Scientific classification
- Domain: Eukaryota
- Kingdom: Animalia
- Phylum: Arthropoda
- Class: Insecta
- Order: Lepidoptera
- Family: Sesiidae
- Tribe: Osminiini
- Genus: Homogyna; Le Cerf, 1911

Species
- See text

Genus of moths

Homogyna is a genus of moths in the family Sesiidae.

== Species ==
- Homogyna alluaudi Le Cerf, 1911
- Homogyna bartschi de Freina, 2011
- Homogyna ignivittata Hampson, 1919
- Homogyna pythes (Druce, 1899)
- Homogyna sanguicosta Hampson, 1919
- Homogyna sanguipennis (Meyrick, 1926)
- Homogyna xanthophora (Hampson, 1910)
- Homogyna pygmaea (Rebel, 1899)
- Homogyna endopyra (Hampson, 1910)
- Homogyna spadicicorpus Prout, 1919
