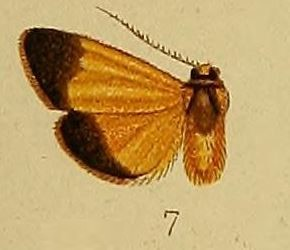
- Pseudlepista atrizona

Scientific classification
- Kingdom: Animalia
- Phylum: Arthropoda
- Class: Insecta
- Order: Lepidoptera
- Superfamily: Noctuoidea
- Family: Erebidae
- Subfamily: Arctiinae
- Tribe: Lithosiini
- Genus: Pseudlepista; Hampson, 1910

= Pseudlepista =

Genus of moths

Pseudlepista is a genus of moths in the subfamily Arctiinae.

== Species ==
- Pseudlepista atriceps Aurivillius, 1921
- Pseudlepista atrizona Hampson, 1910
- Pseudlepista flavicosta Hampson, 1910
- Pseudlepista holoxantha Hampson, 1918
