= Homogyna bartschi =

Scientific classification
- Domain: Eukaryota
- Kingdom: Animalia
- Phylum: Arthropoda
- Class: Insecta
- Order: Lepidoptera
- Family: Sesiidae
- Genus: Homogyna
- Species: H. bartschi

Binomial name
- Homogyna bartschi de Freina, 2011

Species of moth

Homogyna bartschi is a moth of the family Sesiidae. It is known from South Africa.
