= Paramelisa dollmani =

Scientific classification
- Kingdom: Animalia
- Phylum: Arthropoda
- Class: Insecta
- Order: Lepidoptera
- Superfamily: Noctuoidea
- Family: Erebidae
- Subfamily: Arctiinae
- Genus: Paramelisa
- Species: P. dollmani

Binomial name
- Paramelisa dollmani Hampson, 1920

Species of moth

Paramelisa dollmani is a moth of the family Erebidae. It was described by George Hampson in 1920. It is found in Angola, Uganda and Zambia.
