= Homogyna spadicicorpus =

Scientific classification
- Kingdom: Animalia
- Phylum: Arthropoda
- Clade: Pancrustacea
- Class: Insecta
- Order: Lepidoptera
- Family: Sesiidae
- Genus: Homogyna
- Species: H. spadicicorpus

Binomial name
- Homogyna spadicicorpus Prout, 1919

Species of moth

Homogyna spadicicorpus is a moth of the family Sesiidae. It is known from Zambia.
