= Eyralpenus meinhofi =

Scientific classification
- Kingdom: Animalia
- Phylum: Arthropoda
- Class: Insecta
- Order: Lepidoptera
- Superfamily: Noctuoidea
- Family: Erebidae
- Subfamily: Arctiinae
- Genus: Eyralpenus
- Species: E. meinhofi

Binomial name
- Eyralpenus meinhofi (Bartel, 1903)

Synonyms
- Spilosoma meinhofi Bartel, 1903; Eyralpenus (Pareyralpenus) meinhofi; Amsacta atricrures Hampson, 1916; Estigmene melanocera Hampson, 1916; Estigmene metaxantha Hampson, 1920

Species of moth

Eyralpenus meinhofi is a polymorphic tiger-moth in the family Erebidae first described by Max Bartel in 1903. It is known from the east and central Africa: Tanzania, Zambia (Goodger, Watson, 1995, as meinhofi), Zambia, Angola, Zaire (Goodger, Watson, 1995, as metaxantha); Malawi (Goodger, Watson, 1995 and Dubatolov, 2009, as melanocera); Zaire (Kiriakoff, 1965, as melanocera); Zimbabwe (Dubatolov, 2011).
