= Pseudoradiarctia lentifasciata =

Scientific classification
- Kingdom: Animalia
- Phylum: Arthropoda
- Class: Insecta
- Order: Lepidoptera
- Superfamily: Noctuoidea
- Family: Erebidae
- Subfamily: Arctiinae
- Genus: Pseudoradiarctia
- Species: P. lentifasciata

Binomial name
- Pseudoradiarctia lentifasciata (Hampson, 1916)

Synonyms
- Diacrisia lentifasciata Hampson, 1916

Species of moth

Pseudoradiarctia lentifasciata is a moth in the family Erebidae. It was described by George Hampson in 1916. It is found in South Africa, Zambia and Zimbabwe.
