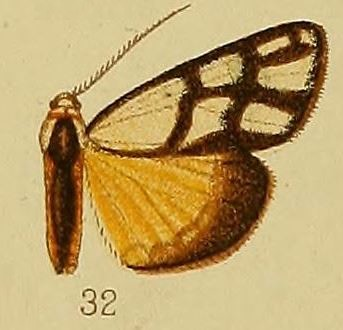

Scientific classification
- Kingdom: Animalia
- Phylum: Arthropoda
- Clade: Pancrustacea
- Class: Insecta
- Order: Lepidoptera
- Superfamily: Noctuoidea
- Family: Erebidae
- Subfamily: Arctiinae
- Genus: Anaphosia
- Species: A. eurygrapha

Binomial name
- Anaphosia eurygrapha Hampson, 1910

Synonyms
- Habrosynilema eurygrapha (Hampson, 1910)

= Anaphosia eurygrapha =

Species of moth

Anaphosia eurygrapha is a moth of the family Erebidae. It was described by George Hampson in 1910. It is found in the Democratic Republic of the Congo and Zambia.
