= Homogyna sanguicosta =

Scientific classification
- Kingdom: Animalia
- Phylum: Arthropoda
- Class: Insecta
- Order: Lepidoptera
- Family: Sesiidae
- Genus: Homogyna
- Species: H. sanguicosta

Binomial name
- Homogyna sanguicosta Hampson, 1919

Species of moth

Homogyna sanguicosta is a moth of the family Sesiidae. It is known from Cameroon, Zambia and Zimbabwe.
