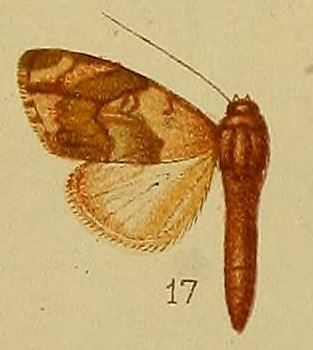

Scientific classification
- Kingdom: Animalia
- Phylum: Arthropoda
- Class: Insecta
- Order: Lepidoptera
- Superfamily: Noctuoidea
- Family: Nolidae
- Genus: Aiteta
- Species: A. thermistis

Binomial name
- Aiteta thermistis (Hampson, 1910)

Synonyms
- Carea thermistis Hampson, 1910

= Aiteta thermistis =

Species of moth

Aiteta thermistis is a moth in the family of Nolidae.

== Distribution ==
It is found in Zambia.
