= Bunaeopsis phidias =

Scientific classification
- Domain: Eukaryota
- Kingdom: Animalia
- Phylum: Arthropoda
- Class: Insecta
- Order: Lepidoptera
- Family: Saturniidae
- Genus: Bunaeopsis
- Species: B. phidias

Binomial name
- Bunaeopsis phidias (Weymer, 1909)

Synonyms
- Nudaurelia phidias Weymer, 1909; Bunaeopsis maasseni (Strand, 1911)

Species of moth

Bunaeopsis phidias is a moth of the family Saturniidae. It is known from Africa, including Tanzania, Eritrea, Malawi and Zambia.

The body of the male of this species has a length of 37 millimetres (1.5 in), its forewings 64 mm (2.5 in) and it has a wingspan of 112 mm (4.4 in). The ground colour of the forewings is a yellowish brown.
