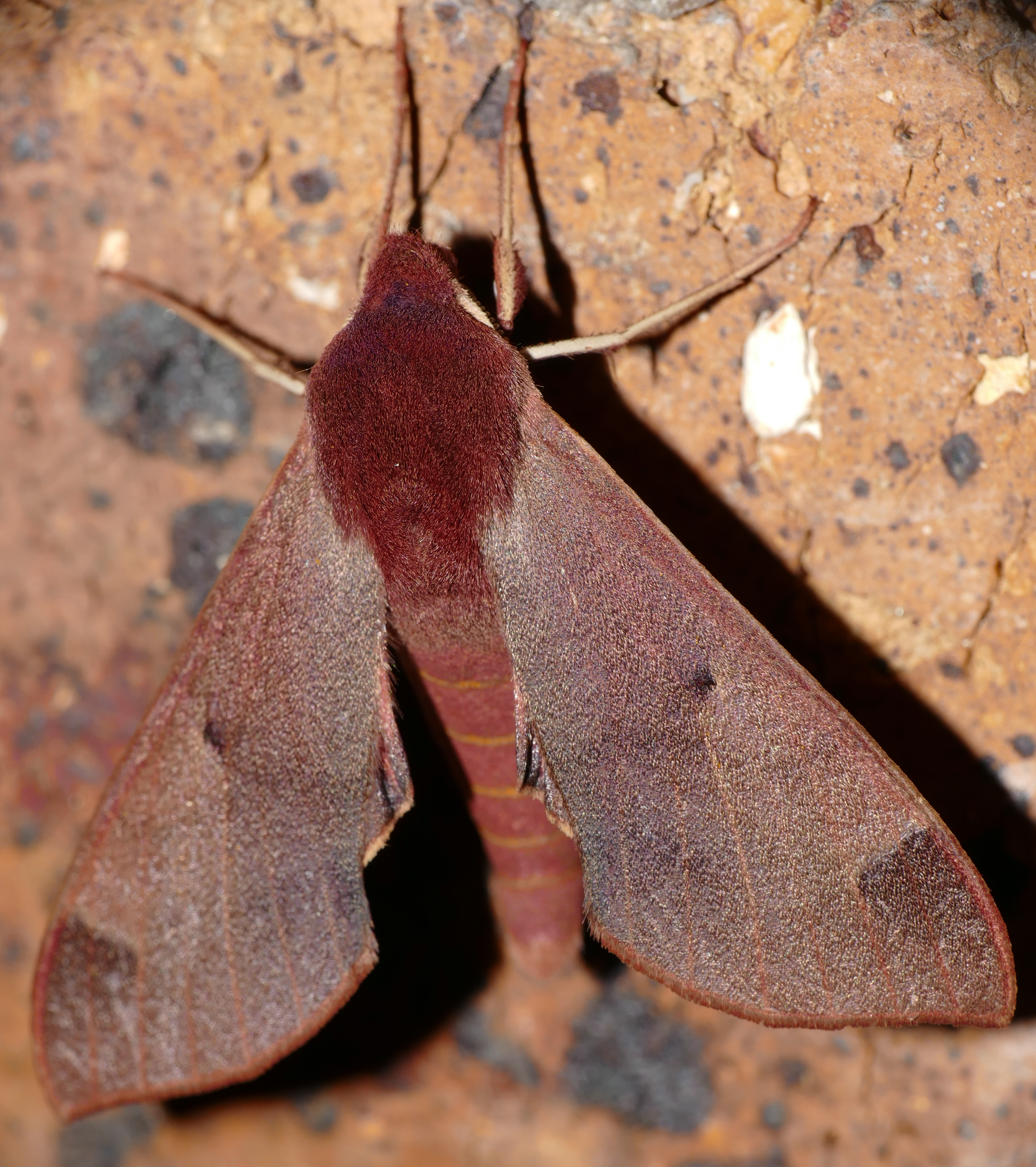

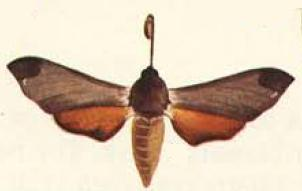

Scientific classification
- Domain: Eukaryota
- Kingdom: Animalia
- Phylum: Arthropoda
- Class: Insecta
- Order: Lepidoptera
- Family: Sphingidae
- Genus: Afroclanis
- Species: A. calcareus

Binomial name
- Afroclanis calcareus (Rothschild & Jordan, 1907)

Synonyms
- Polyptychus calcareus Rothschild & Jordan, 1907; Polyptychus burorum Strand, 1915

= Afroclanis calcareus =

Species of moth

Afroclanis calcareus is a moth of the family Sphingidae. It is known from Brachystegia woodland from northern South Africa, Zimbabwe and Mozambique to Malawi, Zambia, the Democratic Republic of the Congo and Tanzania.

The length of the forewings is 29–32 mm for males and 34–36 mm for females and the wingspan is 68–76 mm.
