= Pseudoradiarctia scita =

Scientific classification
- Kingdom: Animalia
- Phylum: Arthropoda
- Class: Insecta
- Order: Lepidoptera
- Superfamily: Noctuoidea
- Family: Erebidae
- Subfamily: Arctiinae
- Genus: Pseudoradiarctia
- Species: P. scita

Binomial name
- Pseudoradiarctia scita (Walker, [1865])

Synonyms
- Antheua scita Walker, 1865; Spilosoma walkeri Aurivillius, 1900

Species of moth

Pseudoradiarctia scita is a moth in the family Erebidae. It was described by Francis Walker in 1865. It is found in Cameroon, the Democratic Republic of the Congo, Ghana, Nigeria, South Africa, Tanzania, the Gambia, Uganda and Zambia.

The larvae feed on Cassia tomentosa, Acacia mearnsii, Smilax kraussiana and Tagetes erecta.
