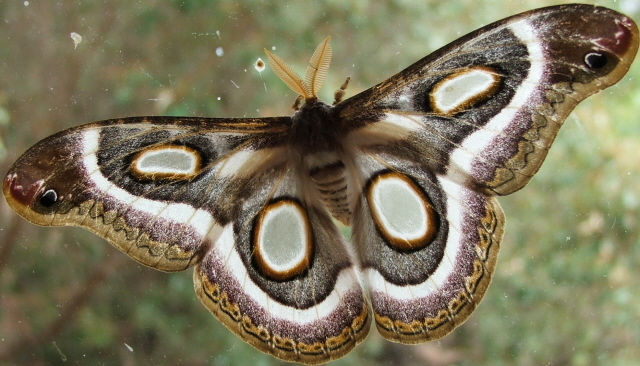

Scientific classification
- Kingdom: Animalia
- Phylum: Arthropoda
- Class: Insecta
- Order: Lepidoptera
- Family: Saturniidae
- Genus: Epiphora
- Species: E. mythimnia

Binomial name
- Epiphora mythimnia Westwood, 1849

Synonyms
- Epiphora scribonia Wallengren, 1860

= Epiphora mythimnia =

Species of moth

Epiphora mythimnia, the white ringed Atlas moth, is a large saturniid moth native to Eastern Africa. The species was first described by John O. Westwood in 1849. With a 10–13 cm wingspan, it is one of the larger moths in Africa.

== Description ==
Much like other moths in its family, the white ringed Atlas moth has a relatively thick fuzzy body with lobed wings. Each lobe has a translucent eyespot surrounded by a white and yellow ring.

== Range ==
The species can be found in Botswana, Eswatini, Kenya, South Africa, Malawi, Mozambique, Zambia, and Zimbabwe.
