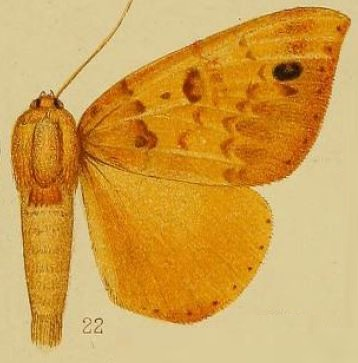

Scientific classification
- Kingdom: Animalia
- Phylum: Arthropoda
- Class: Insecta
- Order: Lepidoptera
- Superfamily: Noctuoidea
- Family: Noctuidae (?)
- Genus: Heliophisma
- Species: H. xanthoptera

Binomial name
- Heliophisma xanthoptera (Hampson, 1910)

Synonyms
- Ophiusa xanthoptera Hampson, 1910; Achaea xanthoptera (Hampson, 1910)

= Heliophisma xanthoptera =

Species of moth

Heliophisma xanthoptera is a species of moth of the family Erebidae first described by George Hampson in 1910. It is found in Kenya, Mozambique, Tanzania Sierra Leone, South Africa and Zambia.
