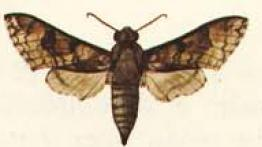

Scientific classification
- Domain: Eukaryota
- Kingdom: Animalia
- Phylum: Arthropoda
- Class: Insecta
- Order: Lepidoptera
- Family: Sphingidae
- Genus: Praedora
- Species: P. plagiata

Binomial name
- Praedora plagiata Rothschild & Jordan, 1903

Synonyms
- Praedora marshalli meridionalis Kiriakoff, 1954

= Praedora plagiata =

Species of moth

Praedora plagiata is a moth of the family Sphingidae. It is known from savanna from Zimbabwe to Tanzania.

The length of the forewings is 24–29 mm. The forewing upperside is grey with a faint pinkish tone. There is a large brownish-black discal patch present, as well as three ill-defined, brown subbasal and antemedian lines, an indistinct discal line distal to the dark patch and an even less distinct, zigzag postdiscal line. The underside of both wings is yellowish cinnamon brown, with three very indistinct parallel discal lines. The hindwing upperside is greyish brown, palest at the base, without markings. The fringe is white with brown dots.
