= Amata chariessa =

Scientific classification
- Domain: Eukaryota
- Kingdom: Animalia
- Phylum: Arthropoda
- Class: Insecta
- Order: Lepidoptera
- Superfamily: Noctuoidea
- Family: Erebidae
- Subfamily: Arctiinae
- Genus: Amata
- Species: A. chariessa

Binomial name
- Amata chariessa (Jordan, 1936)

Synonyms
- Syntomis chariessa Jordan, 1936

Species of moth

Amata chariessa is a moth of the subfamily Arctiinae. It was described by Karl Jordan in 1936. It is found in Zambia.
