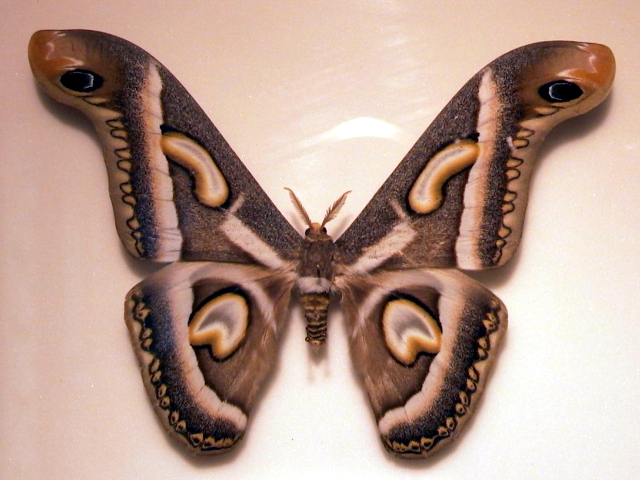
- Adult, male

Scientific classification
- Kingdom: Animalia
- Phylum: Arthropoda
- Class: Insecta
- Order: Lepidoptera
- Family: Saturniidae
- Genus: Epiphora
- Species: E. rectifascia

Binomial name
- Epiphora rectifascia Rothschild, 1907

= Epiphora rectifascia =

Species of moth

Epiphora rectifascia is a moth of the family Saturniidae. It is found in Cameroon, the Democratic Republic of Congo, Kenya, Nigeria, Tanzania, Uganda and Zambia.

== Subspecies ==
- Epiphora rectifascia rectifascia
- Epiphora rectifascia watulegei Rougeot, 1974 (Kenya, Tanzania and Uganda)
- Epiphora rectifascia ileshana Rougeot, 1955 (Nigeria)
