= Eyralpenus diplosticta =

Scientific classification
- Kingdom: Animalia
- Phylum: Arthropoda
- Clade: Pancrustacea
- Class: Insecta
- Order: Lepidoptera
- Superfamily: Noctuoidea
- Family: Erebidae
- Subfamily: Arctiinae
- Genus: Eyralpenus
- Species: E. diplosticta

Binomial name
- Eyralpenus diplosticta (Hampson, 1900)

Synonyms
- Diacrisia diplosticta Hampson, 1900

Species of moth

Eyralpenus diplosticta is a moth of the family Erebidae. It was described by George Hampson in 1900. It is found in Angola, the Democratic Republic of the Congo, Malawi, Mozambique, South Africa, Tanzania and Zambia.

The larvae feed on Gardenia globesa and Clerodendrum glabrum.
