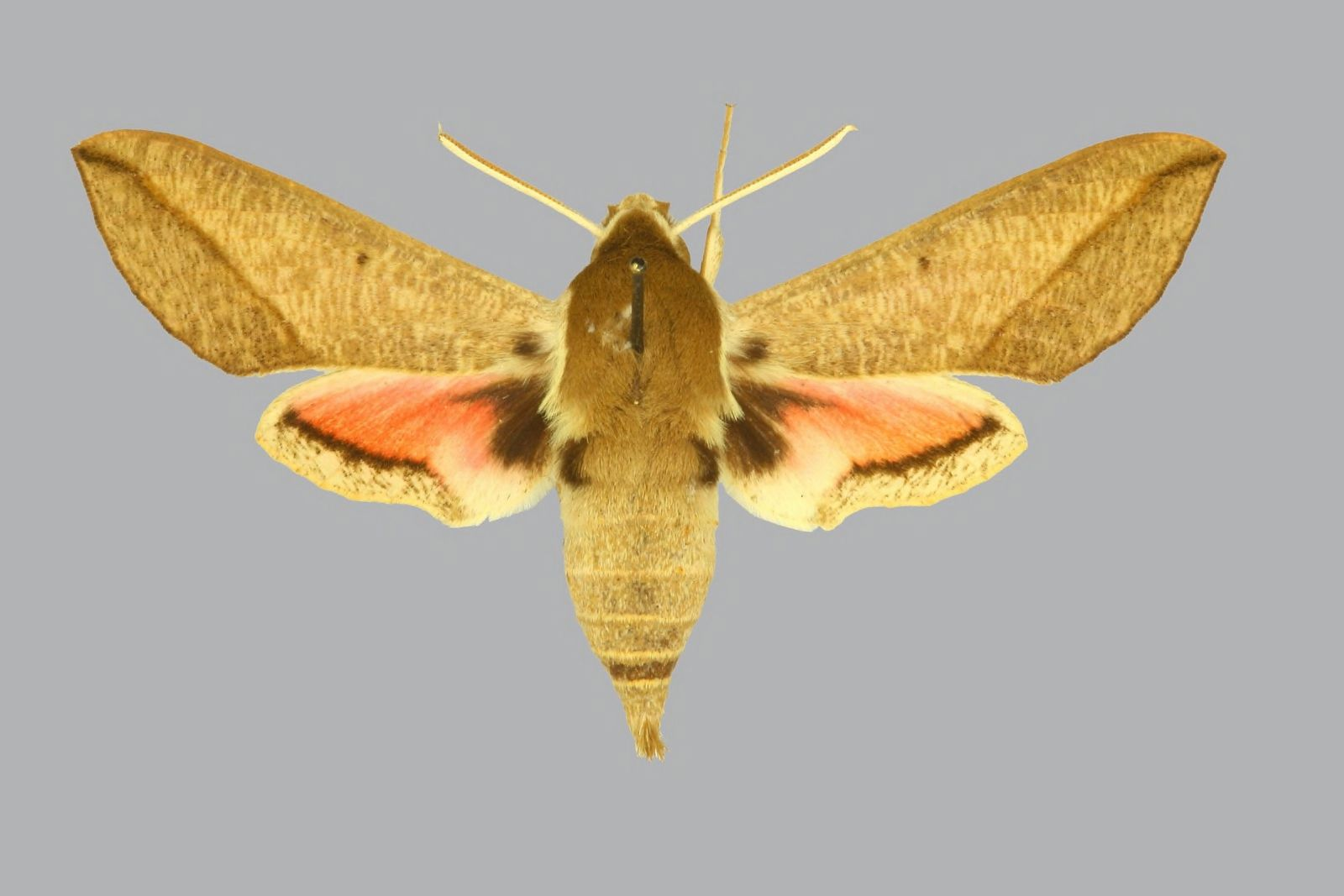

Scientific classification
- Domain: Eukaryota
- Kingdom: Animalia
- Phylum: Arthropoda
- Class: Insecta
- Order: Lepidoptera
- Family: Sphingidae
- Genus: Rhodafra
- Species: R. marshalli

Binomial name
- Rhodafra marshalli Rothschild & Jordan, 1903

= Rhodafra marshalli =

Species of moth

Rhodafra marshalli is a moth of the family Sphingidae. It is known from high, open country from Zimbabwe to Kenya.

The length of the forewings is 23–29 mm.
