= Bergeria haematochrysia =

Scientific classification
- Kingdom: Animalia
- Phylum: Arthropoda
- Class: Insecta
- Order: Lepidoptera
- Superfamily: Noctuoidea
- Family: Erebidae
- Subfamily: Arctiinae
- Genus: Bergeria
- Species: B. haematochrysia

Binomial name
- Bergeria haematochrysia Kiriakoff, 1952

Synonyms
- Bergeria occidentalis Kiriakoff, 1957

Species of moth

Bergeria haematochrysia is a moth of the family Erebidae. It was described by Sergius G. Kiriakoff in 1952. It is found in Cameroon, Zambia and the Democratic Republic of the Congo.
