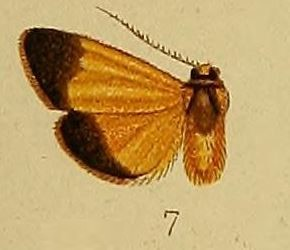

Scientific classification
- Kingdom: Animalia
- Phylum: Arthropoda
- Class: Insecta
- Order: Lepidoptera
- Superfamily: Noctuoidea
- Family: Erebidae
- Subfamily: Arctiinae
- Genus: Pseudlepista
- Species: P. atrizona

Binomial name
- Pseudlepista atrizona Hampson, 1910

= Pseudlepista atrizona =

Species of moth

Pseudlepista atrizona is a moth in the subfamily Arctiinae. It was described by George Hampson in 1910. It is found in Zambia.
