= Eyralpenus scioana =

Scientific classification
- Kingdom: Animalia
- Phylum: Arthropoda
- Clade: Pancrustacea
- Class: Insecta
- Order: Lepidoptera
- Superfamily: Noctuoidea
- Family: Erebidae
- Subfamily: Arctiinae
- Genus: Eyralpenus
- Species: E. scioana

Binomial name
- Eyralpenus scioana (Oberthür, 1880)

Synonyms
- Cycnia scioana Oberthür, 1880; Spilarctia abbotti Holland, 1892; Spilarctia abbottii Holland, 1896; Diacrisia scioana var. multipicta Strand, 1921; Diacrisia scioana intensa Rothschild, 1910; Spilosoma paucipunctata Kiriakoff, 1963

Species of moth

Eyralpenus scioana is a moth of the family Erebidae. It was described by Charles Oberthür in 1880. It is found in Angola, Cameroon, the Democratic Republic of the Congo, Ethiopia, Kenya, Malawi, Mozambique, Namibia, Tanzania, Uganda, Zambia and Zimbabwe.

The larvae feed on Ipomoea species.

== Subspecies ==
- Eyralpenus scioana scioana
- Eyralpenus scioana intensa (Rothschild, 1910)
- Eyralpenus scioana paucipunctata (Kiriakoff, 1963)
