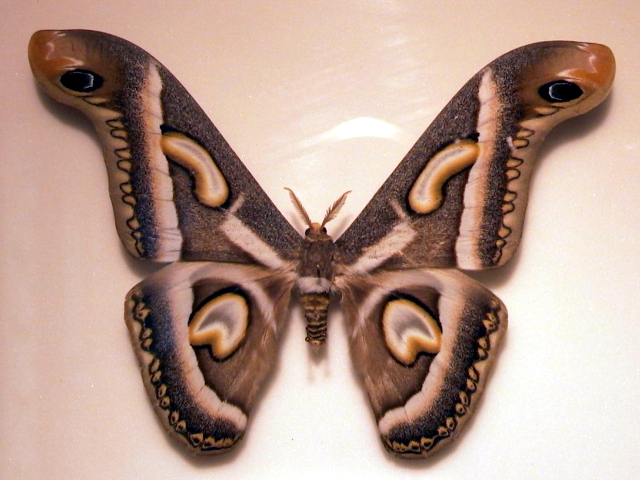
- Epiphora rectifascia

Scientific classification
- Kingdom: Animalia
- Phylum: Arthropoda
- Class: Insecta
- Order: Lepidoptera
- Family: Saturniidae
- Tribe: Attacini
- Genus: Epiphora; Wallengren, 1860

Synonyms
- Drepanoptera Rothschild, 1895; Faidherbia Guérin-Méneville, 1865; Falcipennae Pinhey, 1972

= Epiphora (moth) =

Genus of moths

Epiphora is a genus of large moths in the family Saturniidae. The genus was first described by Wallengren in 1860. They are native to Sub-Saharan Africa.

Epiphora mythimnia (Westwood, 1849)

== Species ==
- Epiphora aequatorialis (Testout, 1935)
- Epiphora albida (Druce, 1886)
- Epiphora antinorii (Oberthuer, 1880)
- Epiphora atbarina (Butler, 1877)
- Epiphora bauhiniae (Guerin-Meneville, 1829)
- Epiphora bedoci (Bouvier, 1929)
- Epiphora berliozi (Rougeot, 1948)
- Epiphora boolana (Strand, 1909)
- Epiphora boursini Testout, 1935
- Epiphora bouvieri Testout, 1935
- Epiphora brunnea (Bouvier, 1930)
- Epiphora cadioui Bouyer, 2008
- Epiphora congolana (Bouvier, 1929)
- Epiphora conjuncta (Bouvier, 1930)
- Epiphora cordieri (Bouvier, 1928)
- Epiphora cotei (Testout, 1935)
- Epiphora damarensis Schultze, 1913
- Epiphora elianae Rougeot, 1974
- Epiphora feae Aurivillius, 1910
- Epiphora fournierae (Le Moult, 1945)
- Epiphora gabonensis (Testout, 1935)
- Epiphora hassoni Bouyer, 2008
- Epiphora imperator (Stoneham, 1933)
- Epiphora intermedia (Rougeot, 1955)
- Epiphora kipengerensis Darge, 2007
- Epiphora lecerfi (Testout, 1935)
- Epiphora liberiensis (Bouvier, 1928)
- Epiphora lugardi Kirby, 1894
- Epiphora macedoi Darge, Mendes & Bivar de Sousa, 2006
- Epiphora macrops Bouvier, 1929
- Epiphora magdalena Gruenberg, 1909
- Epiphora manowensis (Gschwandner, 1923)
- Epiphora marginimacula Joicey & Talbot, 1924
- Epiphora mineti Darge, 1994
- Epiphora miriakamba Darge, 2007
- Epiphora modesta (Bouvier, 1936)
- Epiphora murphyi Bouyer, 2008
- Epiphora mythimnia (Westwood, 1849)
- Epiphora newporti Bouyer, 2007
- Epiphora niepelti (Gschwandner, 1925)
- Epiphora nubilosa (Testout, 1938)
- Epiphora oberprieleri Bouyer, 2008
- Epiphora obscura Dufrane, 1953
- Epiphora pelosoma (W. Rothschild, 1907)
- Epiphora perspicua (Butler, 1878)
- Epiphora ploetzi (Weymer, 1880)
- Epiphora pygmaea (Bouvier, 1929)
- Epiphora rectifascia W. Rothschild, 1907
- Epiphora rotunda Naumann, 2006
- Epiphora rufa (Bouvier, 1929)
- Epiphora schultzei Aurivillius, 1905
- Epiphora styrax Darge, 1994
- Epiphora testenoirei (Bouvier, 1929)
- Epiphora testouti (Rougeot, 1948)
- Epiphora torquata (Bouvier, 1929)
- Epiphora vacuna (Westwood, 1849)
- Epiphora vacunoides (Testout, 1948)
- Epiphora victoria (Maassen & Weyding, 1885)
- Epiphora werneri Darge, 2007
- Epiphora weymeri Druce
