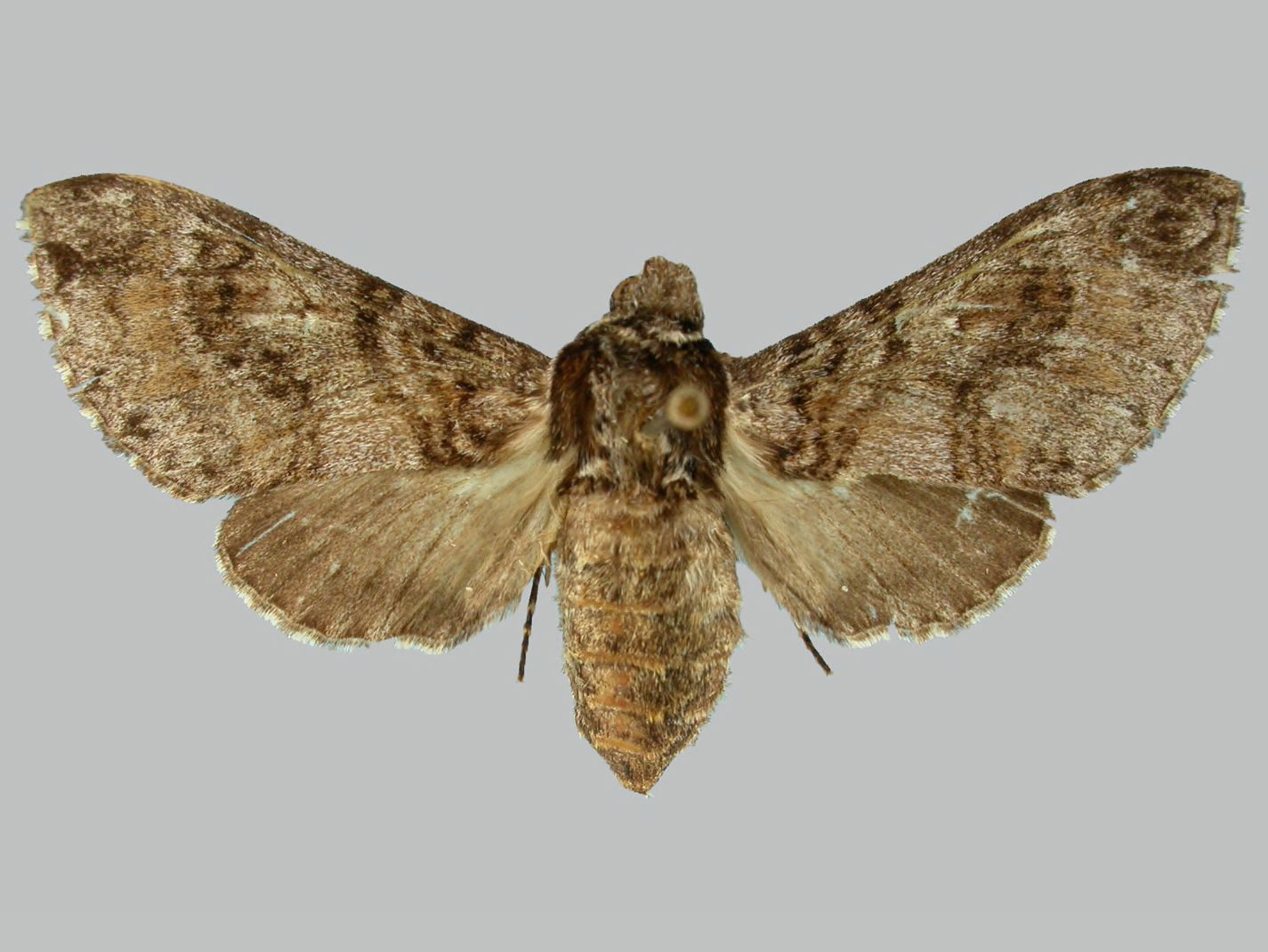

Scientific classification
- Domain: Eukaryota
- Kingdom: Animalia
- Phylum: Arthropoda
- Class: Insecta
- Order: Lepidoptera
- Family: Sphingidae
- Genus: Praedora
- Species: P. marshalli

Binomial name
- Praedora marshalli Rothschild & Jordan, 1903

Synonyms
- Praedora marshalli australis Clark, 1930; Praedora marshalli swierstrae Stevenson, 1938

= Praedora marshalli =

Species of moth

Praedora marshalli is a moth of the family Sphingidae. It is known from savanna and bush in northern South Africa, Angola, Botswana and Zambia.

The length of the forewings is about 20 mm. The body upperside is brownish grey. The collar with a thin, almost white, transverse line. The abdomen upperside has a series of small mesial dots and a longitudinal lateral band that are brownish black, and two widely separated rows of whitish dorsal dots. The body underside is grey. The forewing upperside is grey with brownish black markings. The fringe is brown, with heavy whitish-grey spots. The underside of both wings is brownish-grey, with traces of two discal lines. The hindwing upperside is pale greyish brown, but darker distally. The fringe is brown, with heavy whitish-grey spots.
