= List of moths of Senegal =

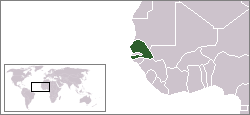
Location of Senegal

Moths of Senegal represent about 190 known moth species. The moths (mostly nocturnal) and butterflies (mostly diurnal) together make up the taxonomic order Lepidoptera.

This is a list of moth species which have been recorded in Senegal.

== Arctiidae ==
- Acantharctia lacteata Rothschild, 1933
- Acantharctia nivea Aurivillius, 1900
- Afrowatsonius marginalis (Walker, 1855)
- Aloa moloneyi (Druce, 1887)
- Alpenus affiniola (Strand, 1919)
- Alpenus maculosa (Stoll, 1781)
- Amata lateralis (Boisduval, 1836)
- Amerila fennia (Druce, 1887)
- Amerila pannosa (Grünberg, 1908)
- Amerila puella (Fabricius, 1793)
- Amerila vitrea Plötz, 1880
- Apisa subcanescens Rothschild, 1910
- Automolis subulva (Mabille, 1884)
- Epilacydes scita (Walker, 1865)
- Estigmene flaviceps Hampson, 1907
- Estigmene laglaizei Rothschild, 1910
- Estigmene senegalensis Rothschild, 1933
- Estigmene testaceoflava Rothschild, 1933
- Estigmene unilinea Rothschild, 1910
- Euchromia folletii (Guérin-Méneville, 1832)
- Euchromia lethe (Fabricius, 1775)
- Logunovium nigricosta (Holland, 1893)
- Micralarctia punctulatum (Wallengren, 1860)
- Spilosoma castelli Rothschild, 1933
- Spilosoma occidens (Rothschild, 1910)
- Spilosoma quadrilunata (Hampson, 1901)
- Spilosoma rava (Druce, 1898)
- Teracotona rhodophaea (Walker, 1865)
- Teracotona senegalensis Rothschild, 1933
- Thyretes negus Oberthür, 1878
- Trichaeta parva Aurivillius, 1910
- Utetheisa pulchella (Linnaeus, 1758)

== Cosmopterigidae ==
- Anatrachyntis risbeci (Ghesquière, 1940)
- Cosmopterix luteoapicalis Sinev, 2002

== Cossidae ==
- Azygophleps psyche Le Cerf, 1919
- Eremocossus senegalensis Le Cerf, 1919

== Crambidae ==
- Euclasta varii Popescu-Gorj & Constantinescu, 1973
- Nomophila noctuella ([Denis & Schiffermüller], 1775)
- Pleuroptya balteata (Fabricius, 1798)
- Synclera traducalis (Zeller, 1852)

== Drepanidae ==
- Negera natalensis (Felder, 1874)

== Geometridae ==
- Erastria albosignata (Walker, 1863)
- Euproutia aggravaria (Guenée, 1858)
- Idaea prionodonta (Prout, 1932)
- Isturgia inaequivirgaria (Mabille, 1890)
- Neromia propinquilinea Prout, 1920
- Orbamia octomaculata (Wallengren, 1872)
- Orbamia renimacula (Prout, 1926)
- Scopula paradelpharia Prout, 1920
- Thalassodes albifimbria Warren, 1897
- Zamarada acrochra Prout, 1928
- Zamarada anacantha D. S. Fletcher, 1974
- Zamarada bicuspida D. S. Fletcher, 1974
- Zamarada crystallophana Mabille, 1900
- Zamarada dilucida Warren, 1909
- Zamarada emaciata D. S. Fletcher, 1974
- Zamarada euerces Prout, 1928
- Zamarada nasuta Warren, 1897
- Zygophyxia relictata (Walker, 1866)

== Gracillariidae ==
- Stomphastis thraustica (Meyrick, 1908)

== Lasiocampidae ==
- Beralade bistrigata Strand, 1909
- Chrysopsyche imparilis Aurivillius, 1905
- Euphorea ondulosa (Conte, 1909)
- Lasiocampa bilineata (Mabille, 1884)
- Leipoxais proboscidea (Guérin-Méneville, 1832)
- Mimopacha rotundata Hering, 1941
- Pallastica meloui (Riel, 1909)
- Streblote bakeri (Riel, 1911)
- Theophasida cardinalli (Tams, 1926)

== Lecithoceridae ==
- Torodora hybrista (Meyrick, 1922)

== Limacodidae ==
- Latoia colini Mabille, 1881
- Latoia privativa Hering, 1928

== Lymantriidae ==
- Aroa achrodisca Hampson, 1910
- Dasychira colini (Mabille, 1893)

== Metarbelidae ==
- Kroonia carteri Lehmann, 2010
- Lebedodes wichgrafi (Grünberg, 1910)
- Salagena discata Gaede, 1929
- Salagena inversa Gaede, 1929
- Salagena nigropuncta Le Cerf, 1919

== Noctuidae ==
- Acantholipes aurea Berio, 1966
- Acantholipes semiaurea Berio, 1966
- Achaea catella Guenée, 1852
- Acontia basifera Walker, 1857
- Acontia buchanani (Rothschild, 1921)
- Acontia citrelinea Bethune-Baker, 1911
- Acontia fastrei Hacker, Legrain & Fibiger, 2010
- Acontia hampsoni Hacker, Legrain & Fibiger, 2008
- Acontia imitatrix Wallengren, 1856
- Acontia insocia (Walker, 1857)
- Acontia porphyrea (Butler, 1898)
- Acontia stassarti Hacker, Legrain & Fibiger, 2010
- Acontia transfigurata Wallengren, 1856
- Acontia wahlbergi Wallengren, 1856
- Aegocera rectilinea Boisduval, 1836
- Agoma trimenii (Felder, 1874)
- Amazonides tabida (Guenée, 1852)
- Aspidifrontia hemileuca (Hampson, 1909)
- Aspidifrontia senegalensis Berio, 1966
- Aspidifrontia villiersi (Laporte, 1972)
- Audea paulumnodosa Kühne, 2005
- Brevipecten calimanii (Berio, 1939)
- Calliodes appollina Guenée, 1852
- Cerocala albicornis Berio, 1966
- Chasmina tibialis (Fabricius, 1775)
- Chasmina vestae (Guenée, 1852)
- Clytie tropicalis Rungs, 1975
- Crypsotidia maculifera (Staudinger, 1898)
- Crypsotidia mesosema Hampson, 1913
- Crypsotidia remanei Wiltshire, 1977
- Ctenusa pallida (Hampson, 1902)
- Dysmilichia flavonigra (Swinhoe, 1884)
- Euclidia limbosa Guenée, 1852
- Gesonia nigripalpa Wiltshire, 1977
- Gnamptonyx innexa (Walker, 1858)
- Helicoverpa assulta (Guenée, 1852)
- Hypena obacerralis Walker, [1859]
- Hypotacha isthmigera Wiltshire, 1968
- Iambia jansei Berio, 1966
- Masalia albiseriata (Druce, 1903)
- Masalia bimaculata (Moore, 1888)
- Masalia cheesmanae Seymour, 1972
- Masalia decorata (Moore, 1881)
- Masalia flaviceps (Hampson, 1903)
- Masalia galatheae (Wallengren, 1856)
- Masalia nubila (Hampson, 1903)
- Masalia rubristria (Hampson, 1903)
- Masalia terracottoides (Rothschild, 1921)
- Matopo selecta (Walker, 1865)
- Melanephia nigrescens (Wallengren, 1856)
- Misa memnonia Karsch, 1895
- Mitrophrys magna (Walker, 1854)
- Mitrophrys menete (Cramer, 1775)
- Mocis mayeri (Boisduval, 1833)
- Mythimna languida (Walker, 1858)
- Ophiusa mejanesi (Guenée, 1852)
- Ozarba corniculantis Berio, 1947
- Ozarba leptocyma Hampson, 1914
- Ozarba rubrivena Hampson, 1910
- Pandesma muricolor Berio, 1966
- Pericyma mendax (Walker, 1858)
- Phaegorista agaristoides Boisduval, 1836
- Phaegorista leucomelas (Herrich-Schäffer, 1855)
- Plecopterodes moderata (Wallengren, 1860)
- Polydesma umbricola Boisduval, 1833
- Rhabdophera clathrum (Guenée, 1852)
- Rhabdophera hansali (Felder & Rogenhofer, 1874)
- Rhynchina leucodonta Hampson, 1910
- Saalmuellerana media (Walker, 1857)
- Schausia gladiatoria (Holland, 1893)
- Spodoptera exempta (Walker, 1857)
- Thiacidas kanoensis Hacker & Zilli, 2007
- Thiacidas meii Hacker & Zilli, 2007
- Thiacidas mukim (Berio, 1977)
- Thiacidas stassarti Hacker & Zilli, 2007
- Thiacidas submutata Hacker & Zilli, 2007
- Thyas parallelipipeda (Guenée, 1852)
- Timora senegalensis (Guenée, 1852)

== Nolidae ==
- Blenina chloromelana (Mabille, 1890)

== Notodontidae ==
- Anaphe stellata Guérin-Méneville, 1844
- Epanaphe vuilleti (de Joannis, 1907)

== Psychidae ==
- Eumeta rotunda Bourgogne, 1965
- Melasina murifica Meyrick, 1922

== Pyralidae ==
- Pempelia morosalis (Saalmüller, 1880)

== Saturniidae ==
- Bunaeopsis hersilia (Westwood, 1849)
- Epiphora bauhiniae (Guérin-Méneville, 1832)
- Gonimbrasia occidentalis Rothschild, 1907
- Holocerina angulata (Aurivillius, 1893)
- Imbrasia senegalensis (Olivier, 1792)
- Micragone nenia (Westwood, 1849)
- Micragone nenioides Rougeot, 1979
- Pseudimbrasia deyrollei (J. Thomson, 1858)
- Pseudobunaea irius (Fabricius, 1793)

== Sesiidae ==
- Metasphecia vuilleti Le Cerf, 1917

== Sphingidae ==
- Leucophlebia afra Karsch, 1891
- Neopolyptychus spurrelli (Rothschild & Jordan, 1912)
- Nephele accentifera (Palisot de Beauvois, 1821)
- Nephele peneus (Cramer, 1776)
- Platysphinx phyllis Rothschild & Jordan, 1903
- Pseudoclanis boisduvali (Aurivillius, 1898)
- Pseudoclanis molitor (Rothschild & Jordan, 1912)
- Pseudoclanis rhadamistus (Fabricius, 1781)
- Rufoclanis rosea (Druce, 1882)
- Theretra perkeo Rothschild & Jordan, 1903

== Thyrididae ==
- Amalthocera tiphys Boisduval, 1836

== Tineidae ==
- Agnathosia byrsinopa (Meyrick, 1933)
- Ceratophaga tragoptila (Meyrick, 1917)
- Endromarmata lutipalpis (Meyrick, 1922)
- Hapsifera luteata Gozmány, 1965
- Hapsifera niphoxantha Gozmány, 1965
- Syncalipsis optania (Meyrick, 1908)

== Tortricidae ==
- Eccopsis wahlbergiana Zeller, 1852
