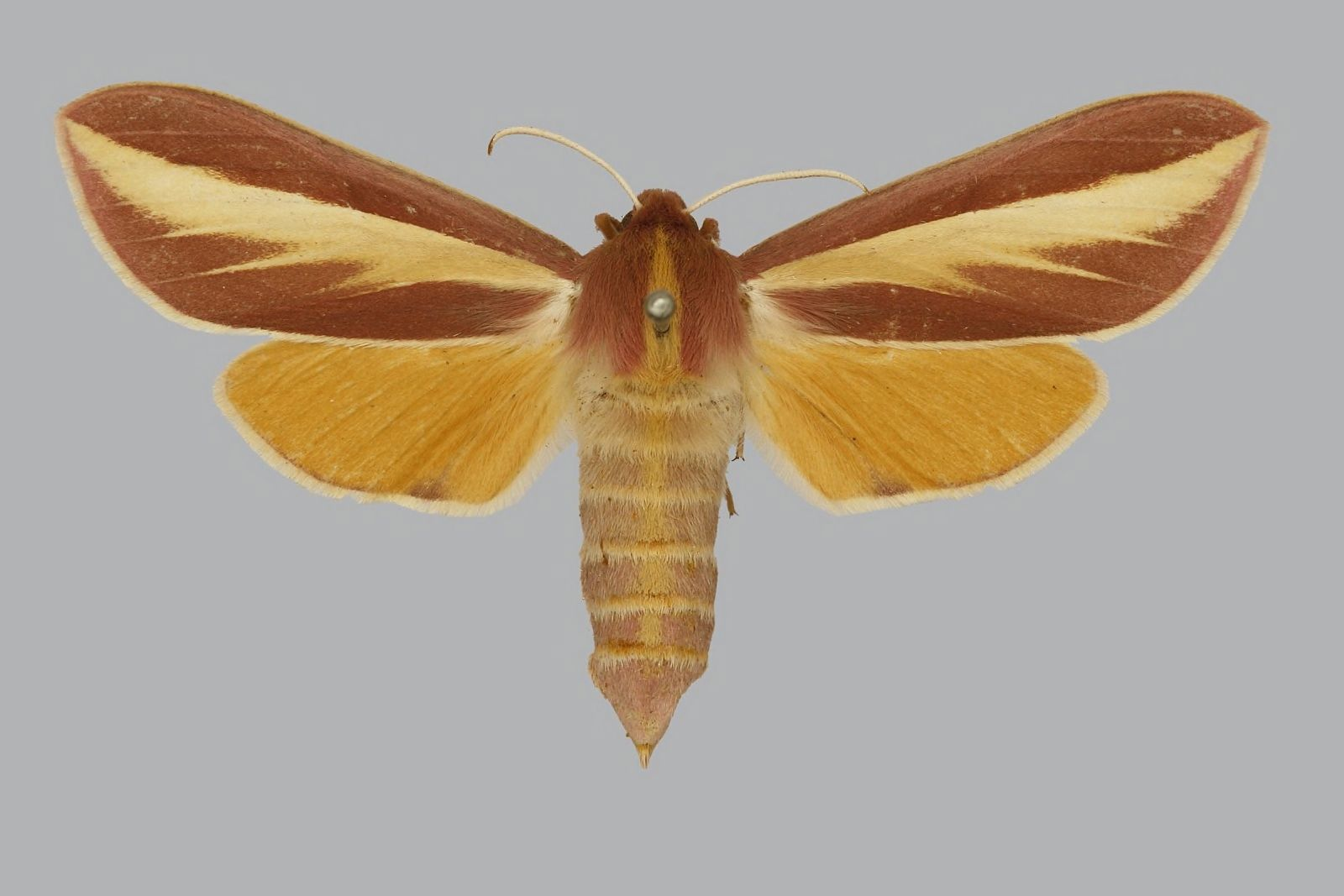
- Leucophlebia emittens male upperside India

Scientific classification
- Domain: Eukaryota
- Kingdom: Animalia
- Phylum: Arthropoda
- Class: Insecta
- Order: Lepidoptera
- Family: Sphingidae
- Genus: Leucophlebia
- Species: L. emittens

Binomial name
- Leucophlebia emittens Walker, 1866

Synonyms
- Leucophlebia bicolor Butler, 1875; Leucophlebia damascena Butler, 1875

= Leucophlebia emittens =

Species of moth

Leucophlebia emittens is a moth of the family Sphingidae. It is known from India and bordering south-western China and Pakistan.

It is similar to, but differs from Leucophlebia afra in that the median pale band of the forewing upperside is produced distally along the veins, especially the posterior ones. It is smaller than Leucophlebia neumanni, in which the forewing upperside median band is somewhat darker, contrasting less with the marginal areas.
