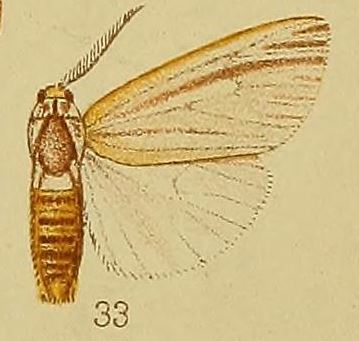
- Acantharctia tenuifasciata

Scientific classification
- Kingdom: Animalia
- Phylum: Arthropoda
- Clade: Pancrustacea
- Class: Insecta
- Order: Lepidoptera
- Superfamily: Noctuoidea
- Family: Erebidae
- Subfamily: Arctiinae
- Subtribe: Spilosomina
- Genus: Acantharctia; Aurivillius, 1899 [1900]

Type species
- Acantharctia nivea Aurivillius, 1899 [1900]

= Acantharctia =

Genus of tiger moths

Acantharctia is a genus of tiger moths in the family Erebidae, found in the Afrotropics.

This genus consists of 15 species:

- Acantharctia ansorgei (Rothschild, 1910)
- Acantharctia atriramosa (Hampson, 1907)
- Acantharctia aurivillii (Bartel, 1903)
- Acantharctia bivittata (Butler, 1898)
- Acantharctia flavicosta (Hampson, 1900)
- Acantharctia guineae (Strand, 1912)
- Acantharctia lacteata (Rothschild, 1933)
- Acantharctia latifasciata (Hampson, 1909)
- Acantharctia latifusca (Hampson, 1907)
- Acantharctia metaleuca (Hampson, 1901)
- Acantharctia mundata (Walker, 1865)
- Acantharctia nigrivena (Rothschild, 1935)
- Acantharctia nivea (Aurivillius, 1900)
- Acantharctia tenuifasciata Hampson, 1910)
- Acantharctia vittata (Aurivillius, 1900)

Acantharctia bicoloria (Gaede, 1916) is considered a former species.
