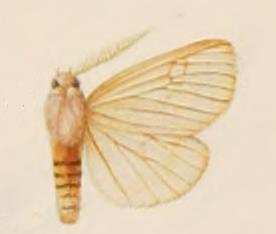

Scientific classification
- Kingdom: Animalia
- Phylum: Arthropoda
- Class: Insecta
- Order: Lepidoptera
- Superfamily: Noctuoidea
- Family: Erebidae
- Subfamily: Arctiinae
- Genus: Acantharctia
- Species: A. ansorgei

Binomial name
- Acantharctia ansorgei Rothschild, 1910

= Acantharctia ansorgei =

Species of moth

"Acantharctia" ansorgei is a moth of the family Erebidae. It is found in Uganda.

== Taxonomy ==
Although placed in the Arctiidae genus Acantharctia, this species is probably a Notodontidae species.
