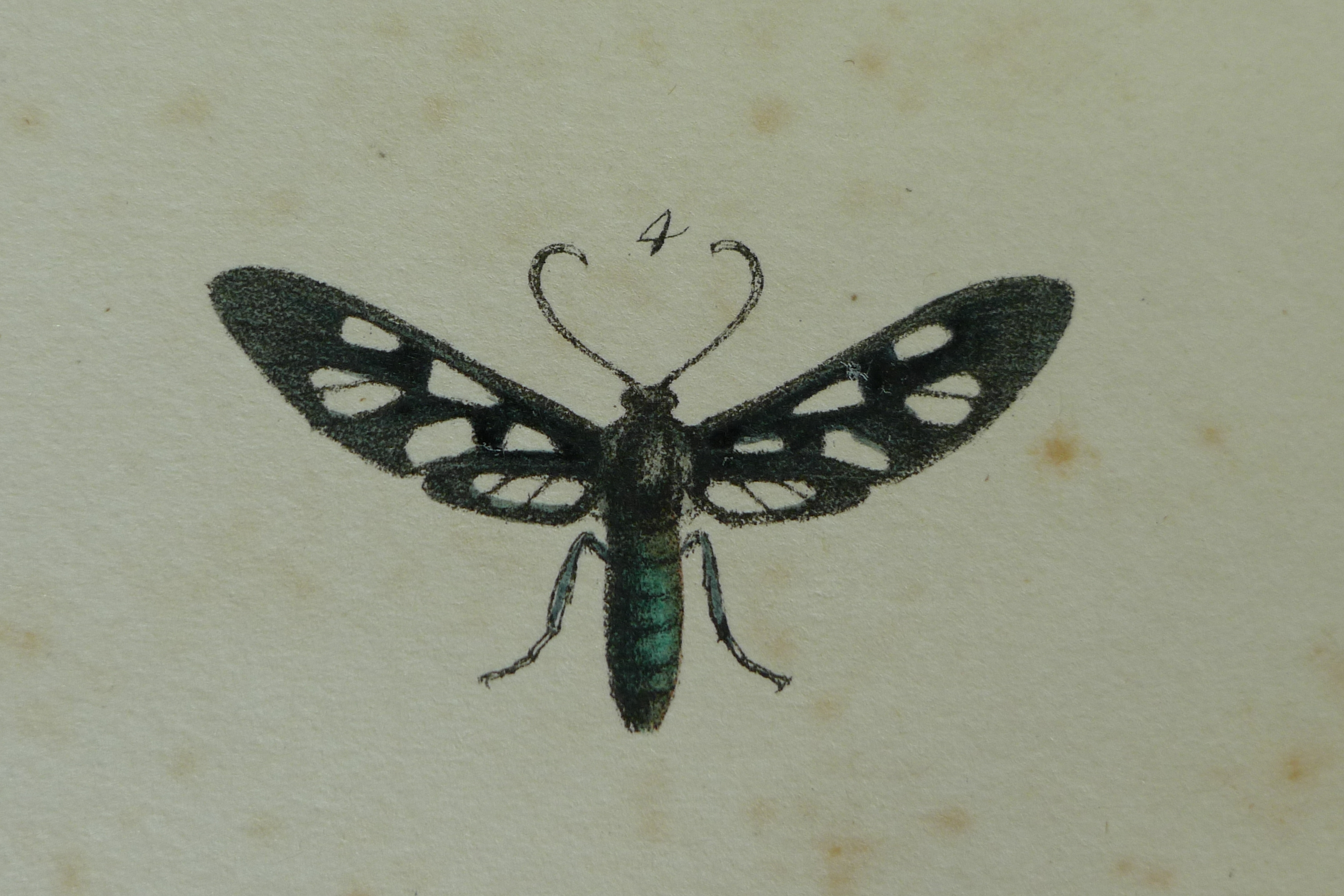
- Trichaeta vigorsi

Scientific classification
- Kingdom: Animalia
- Phylum: Arthropoda
- Class: Insecta
- Order: Lepidoptera
- Superfamily: Noctuoidea
- Family: Erebidae
- Subfamily: Arctiinae
- Genus: Trichaeta; C. Swinhoe, 1892

= Trichaeta =

Genus of moths

Trichaeta is in the subfamily Arctiinae. It was described by Charles Swinhoe in 1641.

== Species ==
- Trichaeta aurantiobasis (Rothschild, 1910)
- Trichaeta bivittata (Walker, [1865])
- Trichaeta orientalis Szent-Ivány, 1942
- Trichaeta parva Aurivillius, 1910
- Trichaeta pterophorina (Mabille, 1892)
- Trichaeta quadriplagata (Snellen, 1895)
- Trichaeta schultzei Aurivillius, 1905
- Trichaeta teneiformis (Walker, 1856)
- Trichaeta tigrina (Walker, [1865])
- Trichaeta vigorsi (Moore, 1859)

== Former species ==
- Trichaeta fulvescens (Walker, 1854)
