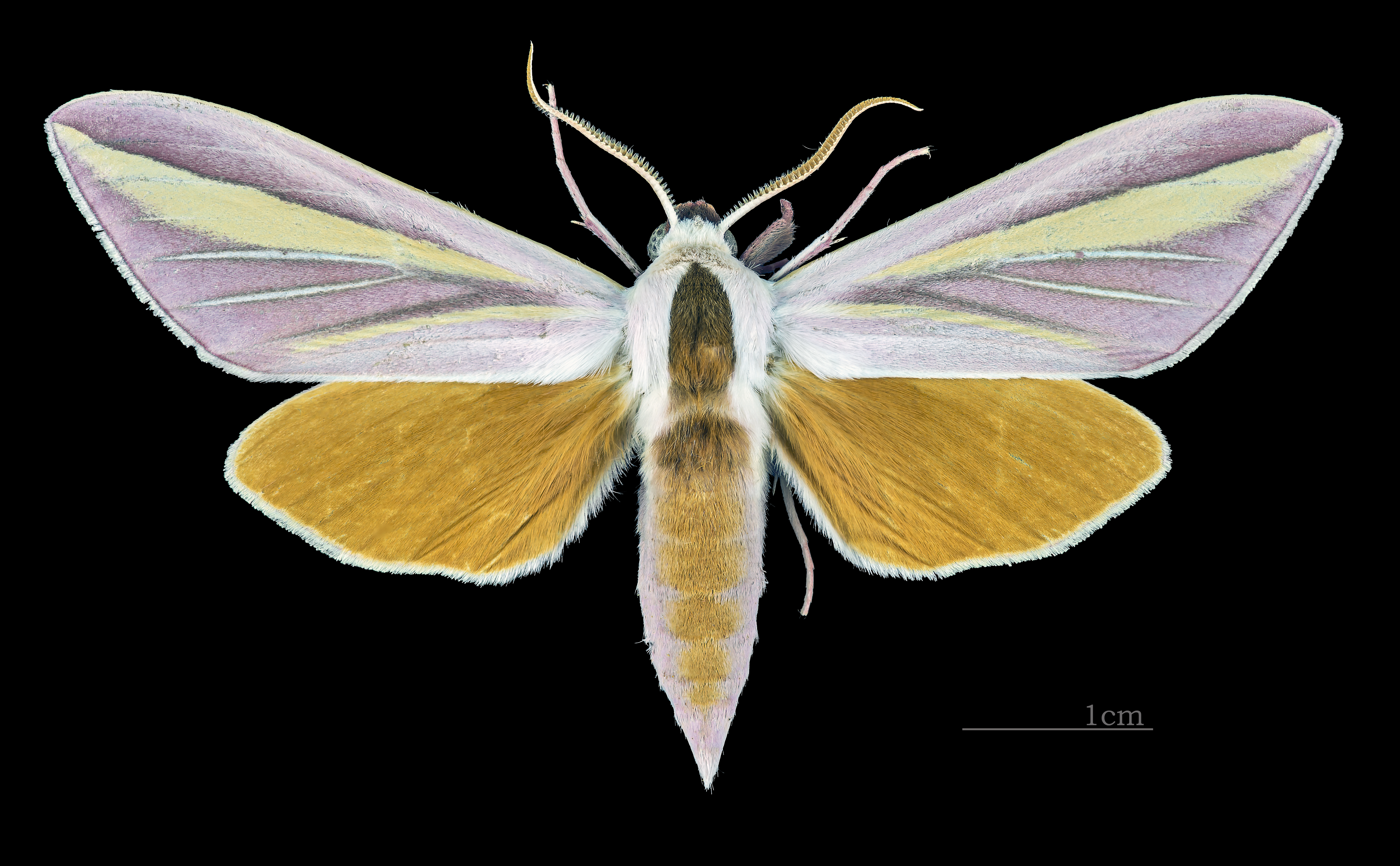
- Male dorsal
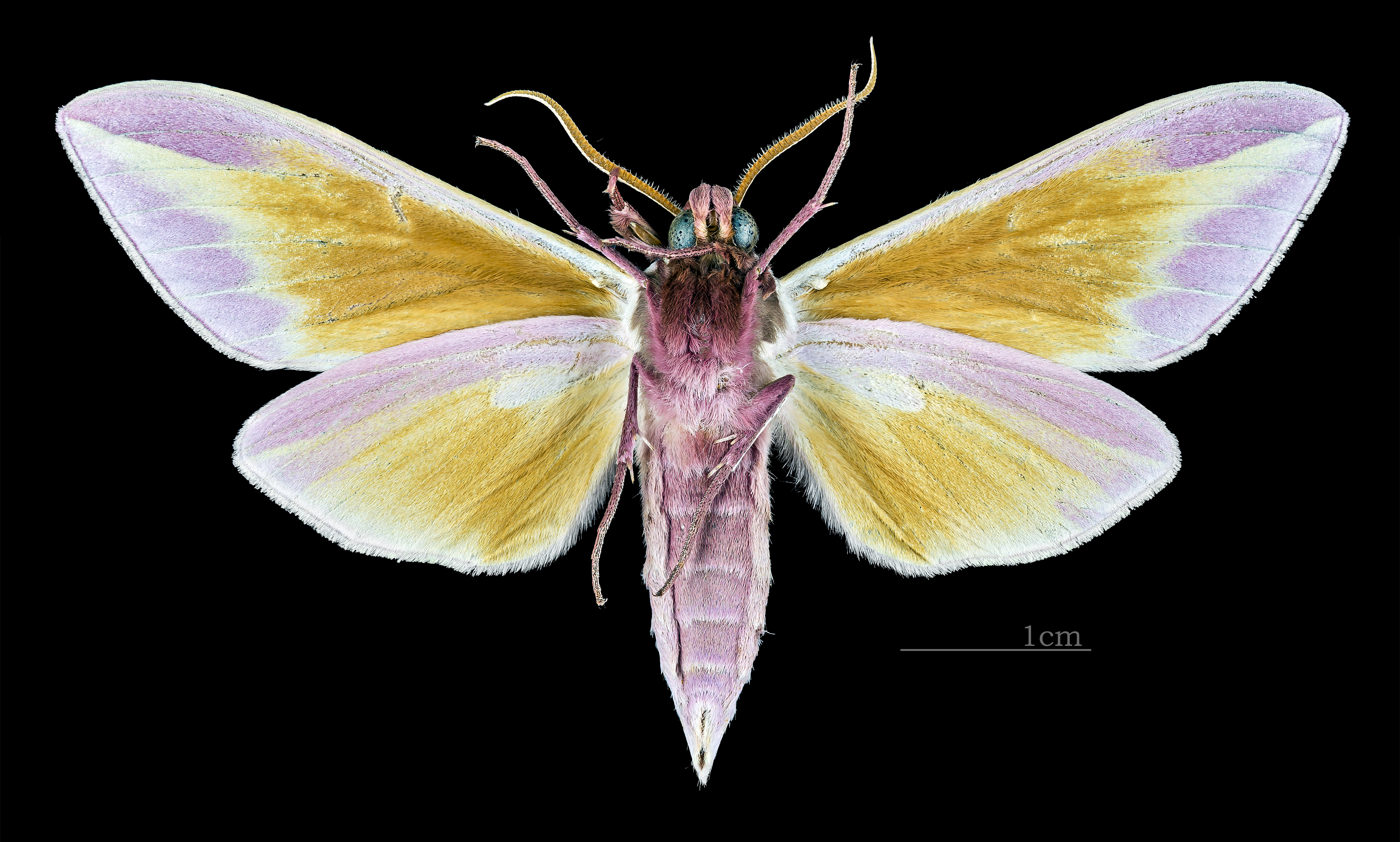
- Male ventral

Scientific classification
- Domain: Eukaryota
- Kingdom: Animalia
- Phylum: Arthropoda
- Class: Insecta
- Order: Lepidoptera
- Family: Sphingidae
- Genus: Leucophlebia
- Species: L. lineata

Binomial name
- Leucophlebia lineata Westwood, 1847

Synonyms
- Leucophlebia luxeri, Boisduval, 1875 (Proposed as a new substitute name for Leucophlebia lineata, but erroneously treated as the valid name for the Sundaland populations of Leucophlebia lineata by Ulf Eitschberger in 2003)

= Leucophlebia lineata =

Large candy-striped hawkmoth

Species of moth

Leucophlebia lineata, the large candy-striped hawkmoth, is a moth of the family Sphingidae. It was described by John O. Westwood in 1847. It is known from Sri Lanka, India, Nepal, Thailand, eastern and southern China, Taiwan, Cambodia, Vietnam, Malaysia (Peninsular, Sarawak), Indonesia (Sumatra, Java, Kalimantan, Flores, Sulawesi) and the Philippines. It is a minor pest of sugarcane.

== Description ==
The wingspan is 62–82 mm. The larvae feed on coarse grasses of the family Poaceae.

In The Fauna of British India, Including Ceylon and Burma: Moths Volume I, the species is described as follows:

Palpi and frons brown; antennae ochreous; vertex of head and sides of thorax and abdomen pale pink; a brownish ochreous stripe on vertex of thorax and abdomen. Fore wing bright pink; a yellow stripe from the base of cell to apex, widest beyond the cell; a short narrow yellow streak in the interno-median interspace from the base; veins 2,3 and 4 white, with some diffused fuscous below them. Hind wing tawny. Cilia yellowish white. The form rosea from South India and Ceylon, is rather smaller and darker than typical lineata. Larva green covered with tubercles; a broad white lateral stripe; head white, with a pink streak on gulae; horn and legs pink.
