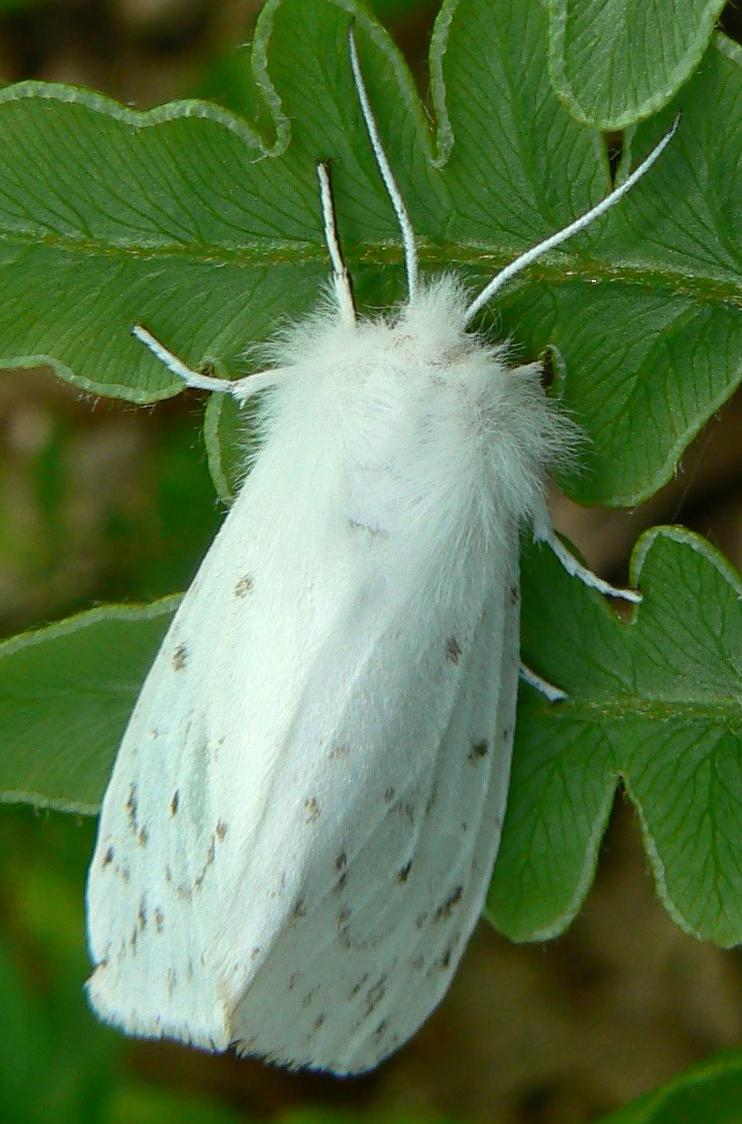
- Estigmene acrea

Scientific classification
- Kingdom: Animalia
- Phylum: Arthropoda
- Clade: Pancrustacea
- Class: Insecta
- Order: Lepidoptera
- Superfamily: Noctuoidea
- Family: Erebidae
- Subfamily: Arctiinae
- Subtribe: Spilosomina
- Genus: Estigmene; Hübner, [1820]

Type species
- Phalaena acrea Drury, 1773

Synonyms
- Leucarctia Packard, 1864

= Estigmene =

Genus of moths

Estigmene is a genus of tiger moths in the family Erebidae erected by Jacob Hübner in 1820. The species in the genus are native to North and Central America.

== Taxonomy ==
Many species from Africa and Asia were formerly included into this genus, but have now been separated into different genera.

== Species ==
- Estigmene acrea (Drury, 1773)
- Estigmene albida (Stretch, 1874)

=== Estigmene sensu lato ===
- Estigmene angustipennis (Walker, 1855)
- Estigmene ansorgei Rothschild, 1910
- Estigmene atrifascia (Hampson, 1907)
- Estigmene flaviceps Hampson, 1907
- Estigmene griseata Hampson, 1916
- Estigmene internigralis Hampson, 1905
- Estigmene laglaizei Rothschild, 1910
- Estigmene melanoxantha Gaede, 1926
- Estigmene multivittata Rothschild, 1910
- Estigmene neuriastis Hampson, 1907
- Estigmene ochreomarginata Bethune-Baker, 1909
- Estigmene rothi Rothschild, 1910
- Estigmene sabulosa Romieux, 1943
- Estigmene tenuistrigata Hampson, 1900
- Estigmene testaceoflava Rothschild, 1933
- Estigmene trivitta (Walker, 1855)
