= Salagena quentinlukei =

Scientific classification
- Kingdom: Animalia
- Phylum: Arthropoda
- Class: Insecta
- Order: Lepidoptera
- Family: Cossidae
- Genus: Salagena
- Species: S. quentinlukei

Binomial name
- Salagena quentinlukei Lehmann, 2008

Species of moth

Salagena quentinlukei is a moth in the family Cossidae. Named for Quentin Luke, it is found in Tanzania and Kenya, where it has been recorded from the Taita Hills. The habitat consists of montane and upper montane areas.

The length of the forewings is about 10 mm.
