= Leucophlebia hogenesi =

Scientific classification
- Kingdom: Animalia
- Phylum: Arthropoda
- Class: Insecta
- Order: Lepidoptera
- Family: Sphingidae
- Genus: Leucophlebia
- Species: L. hogenesi

Binomial name
- Leucophlebia hogenesi Eitschberger, 2003

Species of moth

Leucophlebia hogenesi is a moth of the family Sphingidae. It is known from Sri Lanka.
