= Salagena atridiscata =

Scientific classification
- Kingdom: Animalia
- Phylum: Arthropoda
- Class: Insecta
- Order: Lepidoptera
- Family: Cossidae
- Genus: Salagena
- Species: S. atridiscata

Binomial name
- Salagena atridiscata Hampson, 1910

Species of moth

Salagena atridiscata is a moth in the family Cossidae. It is found in Kenya.
