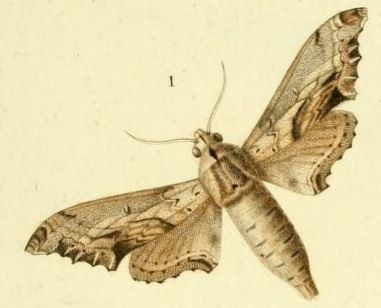
- Oplerclanis rhadamistus

Scientific classification
- Kingdom: Animalia
- Phylum: Arthropoda
- Class: Insecta
- Order: Lepidoptera
- Family: Sphingidae
- Tribe: Smerinthini
- Genus: Oplerclanis; Eitschberger, 2007

= Oplerclanis =

Genus of moths

Oplerclanis is a genus of moths in the family Sphingidae first described by Ulf Eitschberger in 2007.

== Species ==
- Oplerclanis boisduvali (Aurivillius, 1898)
- Oplerclanis rhadamistus (Fabricius, 1781)
