= Acantharctia metaleuca =

Scientific classification
- Kingdom: Animalia
- Phylum: Arthropoda
- Class: Insecta
- Order: Lepidoptera
- Superfamily: Noctuoidea
- Family: Erebidae
- Subfamily: Arctiinae
- Genus: Acantharctia
- Species: A. metaleuca

Binomial name
- Acantharctia metaleuca Hampson, 1901

Species of moth

Acantharctia metaleuca is a moth of the family Erebidae. It was described by George Hampson in 1901. It is found in the Democratic Republic of the Congo, Kenya, Nigeria, Sudan and Uganda.
