= Salagena fetlaworkae =

Scientific classification
- Kingdom: Animalia
- Phylum: Arthropoda
- Class: Insecta
- Order: Lepidoptera
- Family: Cossidae
- Genus: Salagena
- Species: S. fetlaworkae

Binomial name
- Salagena fetlaworkae Rougeot, 1977

Species of moth

Salagena fetlaworkae is a moth in the family Cossidae. It is found in Ethiopia.
