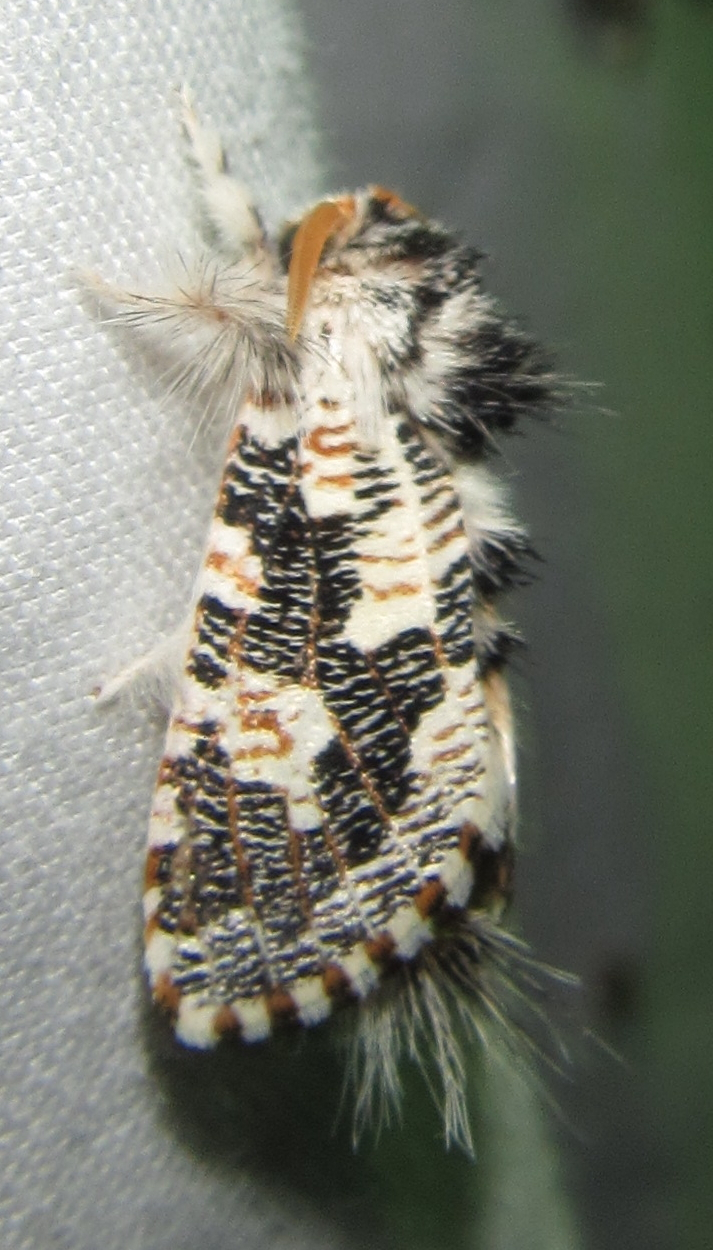
- Salagena tessellata

Scientific classification
- Kingdom: Animalia
- Phylum: Arthropoda
- Class: Insecta
- Order: Lepidoptera
- Family: Cossidae
- Subfamily: Metarbelinae
- Genus: Salagena; Walker, 1865

Synonyms
- Catarbela Aurivillius, 1901; Pettigramma Karsch, 1895; Selagena Hampson, 1910

= Salagena =

Genus of moths

Salagena is a genus of moths in the family Cossidae described by Francis Walker in 1865.

== Species ==
- Salagena albicilia Hampson, 1920
- Salagena albonotata Butler, 1898
- Salagena albovenosa Mey, 2011
- Salagena arcys D. S. Fletcher, 1968
- Salagena atridiscata Hampson, 1910
- Salagena bennybytebieri Lehmann, 2008
- Salagena charlottae Lehmann, 2008
- Salagena cuprea Gaede, 1929
- Salagena denigrata Gaede, 1929
- Salagena discata Gaede, 1929
- Salagena eustrigata Hampson, 1916
- Salagena fetlaworkae Rougeot, 1977
- Salagena fuscata Gaede, 1929
- Salagena guichardi Wiltshire, 1980
- Salagena inversa Gaede, 1929
- Salagena irrorata Le Cerf, 1914
- Salagena meyi Lehmann, 2007
- Salagena mirabilis Le Cerf, 1919
- Salagena narses Fawcett, 1916
- Salagena ngazidya Viette, 1981
- Salagena nigropuncta Le Cerf, 1919
- Salagena obsolescens Hampson, 1910
- Salagena quentinlukei Lehmann, 2008
- Salagena reticulata Janse, 1925
- Salagena tessellata Distant, 1897
- Salagena transversa Walker, 1865
- Salagena violetta Gaede, 1929
