= Salagena violetta =

Scientific classification
- Kingdom: Animalia
- Phylum: Arthropoda
- Class: Insecta
- Order: Lepidoptera
- Family: Cossidae
- Genus: Salagena
- Species: S. violetta

Binomial name
- Salagena violetta Gaede, 1929

Species of moth

Salagena violetta is a moth in the family Cossidae.

== Distribution ==
It is found in Malawi and possibly Tanzania.
