= Salagena meyi =

Scientific classification
- Domain: Eukaryota
- Kingdom: Animalia
- Phylum: Arthropoda
- Class: Insecta
- Order: Lepidoptera
- Family: Cossidae
- Genus: Salagena
- Species: S. meyi

Binomial name
- Salagena meyi Lehmann, 2007

Species of moth

Salagena meyi is a moth in the family Cossidae. It is found in Namibia.
