= Salagena charlottae =

Scientific classification
- Domain: Eukaryota
- Kingdom: Animalia
- Phylum: Arthropoda
- Class: Insecta
- Order: Lepidoptera
- Family: Cossidae
- Genus: Salagena
- Species: S. charlottae

Binomial name
- Salagena charlottae Lehmann, 2008

Species of moth

Salagena charlottae is a moth in the family Cossidae. It is found in Kenya, where it has been recorded from Gogoni Forest. The habitat consists of legume-dominated lowland coastal forests.

== Description ==
The length of the forewings is about 7.5 mm.

== Etymology ==
The species is named for Charlotte Marie-Johanna Haberland, the grandmother of the author.
