= Salagena albicilia =

Scientific classification
- Kingdom: Animalia
- Phylum: Arthropoda
- Class: Insecta
- Order: Lepidoptera
- Family: Cossidae
- Genus: Salagena
- Species: S. albicilia

Binomial name
- Salagena albicilia Hampson, 1920

Species of moth

Salagena albicilia is a moth in the family Cossidae. It is found in Malawi.
