= Trichaeta schultzei =

Scientific classification
- Domain: Eukaryota
- Kingdom: Animalia
- Phylum: Arthropoda
- Class: Insecta
- Order: Lepidoptera
- Superfamily: Noctuoidea
- Family: Erebidae
- Subfamily: Arctiinae
- Genus: Trichaeta
- Species: T. schultzei

Binomial name
- Trichaeta schultzei Aurivillius, 1905

Species of moth

Trichaeta schultzei is a moth in the subfamily Arctiinae. It was described by Per Olof Christopher Aurivillius in 1905 and is found in Cameroon and Nigeria.
