= Estigmene trivitta =

Scientific classification
- Kingdom: Animalia
- Phylum: Arthropoda
- Class: Insecta
- Order: Lepidoptera
- Superfamily: Noctuoidea
- Family: Erebidae
- Subfamily: Arctiinae
- Genus: Estigmene
- Species: E. trivitta

Binomial name
- Estigmene trivitta (Walker, 1855)

Synonyms
- Spilosoma trivitta Walker, 1855

Species of moth

Estigmene trivitta is a moth of the family Erebidae. It was described by Francis Walker in 1855. It is found in Angola, the Democratic Republic of the Congo, Kenya, Malawi, South Africa, Tanzania and Zambia.
