= Salagena mirabilis =

Scientific classification
- Kingdom: Animalia
- Phylum: Arthropoda
- Class: Insecta
- Order: Lepidoptera
- Family: Cossidae
- Genus: Salagena
- Species: S. mirabilis

Binomial name
- Salagena mirabilis Le Cerf, 1919

Species of moth

Salagena mirabilis is a moth belonging to the Cossidae family. It is found in Angola.
