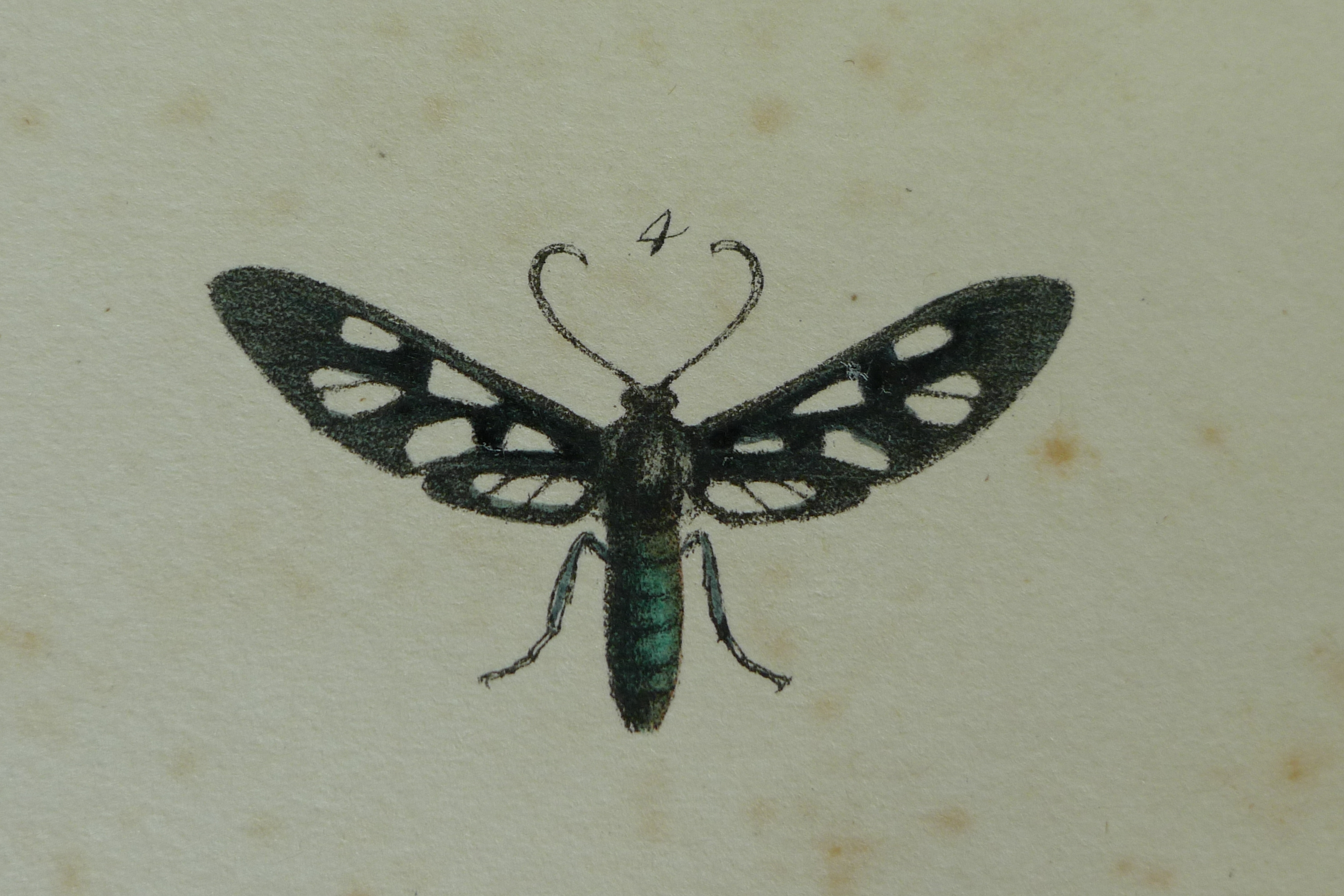

Scientific classification
- Kingdom: Animalia
- Phylum: Arthropoda
- Class: Insecta
- Order: Lepidoptera
- Superfamily: Noctuoidea
- Family: Erebidae
- Subfamily: Arctiinae
- Genus: Trichaeta
- Species: T. vigorsi

Binomial name
- Trichaeta vigorsi (Moore, 1859)

Synonyms
- Syntomis vigorsi Moore, 1859; Trichaetoides vigorsi

= Trichaeta vigorsi =

Species of moth

Trichaeta vigorsi is a species of moth in the subfamily Arctiinae first described by Frederic Moore in 1859. It is found on Java.
