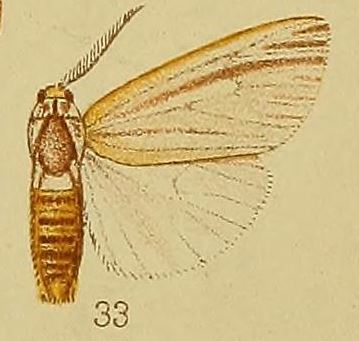

Scientific classification
- Kingdom: Animalia
- Phylum: Arthropoda
- Class: Insecta
- Order: Lepidoptera
- Superfamily: Noctuoidea
- Family: Erebidae
- Subfamily: Arctiinae
- Genus: Acantharctia
- Species: A. tenuifasciata

Binomial name
- Acantharctia tenuifasciata Hampson, 1910

= Acantharctia tenuifasciata =

Species of moth

Acantharctia tenuifasciata is a moth of the family Erebidae. It was described by George Hampson in 1910. It is found in the Democratic Republic of the Congo, Kenya, Malawi and Tanzania.
