= Salagena irrorata =

Scientific classification
- Domain: Eukaryota
- Kingdom: Animalia
- Phylum: Arthropoda
- Class: Insecta
- Order: Lepidoptera
- Family: Cossidae
- Genus: Salagena
- Species: S. irrorata

Binomial name
- Salagena irrorata Le Cerf, 1914

Species of moth

Salagena irrorata is a moth in the family Cossidae. It is found in Kenya.
