= Salagena arcys =

Scientific classification
- Domain: Eukaryota
- Kingdom: Animalia
- Phylum: Arthropoda
- Class: Insecta
- Order: Lepidoptera
- Family: Cossidae
- Genus: Salagena
- Species: S. arcys

Binomial name
- Salagena arcys D. S. Fletcher, 1968

Species of moth

Salagena arcys is a moth in the family Cossidae. It was described by David Stephen Fletcher in 1968. It is found in Tanzania and Uganda.
