= Estigmene rothi =

Scientific classification
- Domain: Eukaryota
- Kingdom: Animalia
- Phylum: Arthropoda
- Class: Insecta
- Order: Lepidoptera
- Superfamily: Noctuoidea
- Family: Erebidae
- Subfamily: Arctiinae
- Genus: Estigmene
- Species: E. rothi

Binomial name
- Estigmene rothi Rothschild, 1910

Species of moth

Estigmene rothi is a moth of the family Erebidae. It was described by Rothschild in 1910. It is found in Nigeria.
