= Estigmene melanoxantha =

Scientific classification
- Domain: Eukaryota
- Kingdom: Animalia
- Phylum: Arthropoda
- Class: Insecta
- Order: Lepidoptera
- Superfamily: Noctuoidea
- Family: Erebidae
- Subfamily: Arctiinae
- Genus: Estigmene
- Species: E. melanoxantha

Binomial name
- Estigmene melanoxantha Gaede, 1926

Species of moth

Estigmene melanoxantha is a moth of the family Erebidae. It was described by Max Gaede in 1926. It is found in the Afrotropical realm.
