= Acantharctia atriramosa =

Scientific classification
- Kingdom: Animalia
- Phylum: Arthropoda
- Class: Insecta
- Order: Lepidoptera
- Superfamily: Noctuoidea
- Family: Erebidae
- Subfamily: Arctiinae
- Genus: Acantharctia
- Species: A. atriramosa

Binomial name
- Acantharctia atriramosa Hampson, 1907

Species of moth

Acantharctia atriramosa is a moth of the family Erebidae. It was described by George Hampson in 1907. It is found in Kenya, Uganda and Zambia.
