= Estigmene tenuistrigata =

Scientific classification
- Kingdom: Animalia
- Phylum: Arthropoda
- Class: Insecta
- Order: Lepidoptera
- Superfamily: Noctuoidea
- Family: Erebidae
- Subfamily: Arctiinae
- Genus: Estigmene
- Species: E. tenuistrigata

Binomial name
- Estigmene tenuistrigata Hampson, 1900

Species of moth

Estigmene tenuistrigata is a moth of the family Erebidae. It was described by George Hampson in 1900. It is found in Angola, Burundi, the Democratic Republic of the Congo, Kenya, Uganda and Zimbabwe.
