= Trichaeta teneiformis =

Scientific classification
- Kingdom: Animalia
- Phylum: Arthropoda
- Class: Insecta
- Order: Lepidoptera
- Superfamily: Noctuoidea
- Family: Erebidae
- Subfamily: Arctiinae
- Genus: Trichaeta
- Species: T. teneiformis

Binomial name
- Trichaeta teneiformis (Walker, 1856)

Synonyms
- Syntomis teneiformis Walker, 1856

Species of moth

Trichaeta teneiformis is a moth in the subfamily Arctiinae. It was described by Francis Walker in 1856. It is found in India (Himachal Pradesh) and Bhutan.
