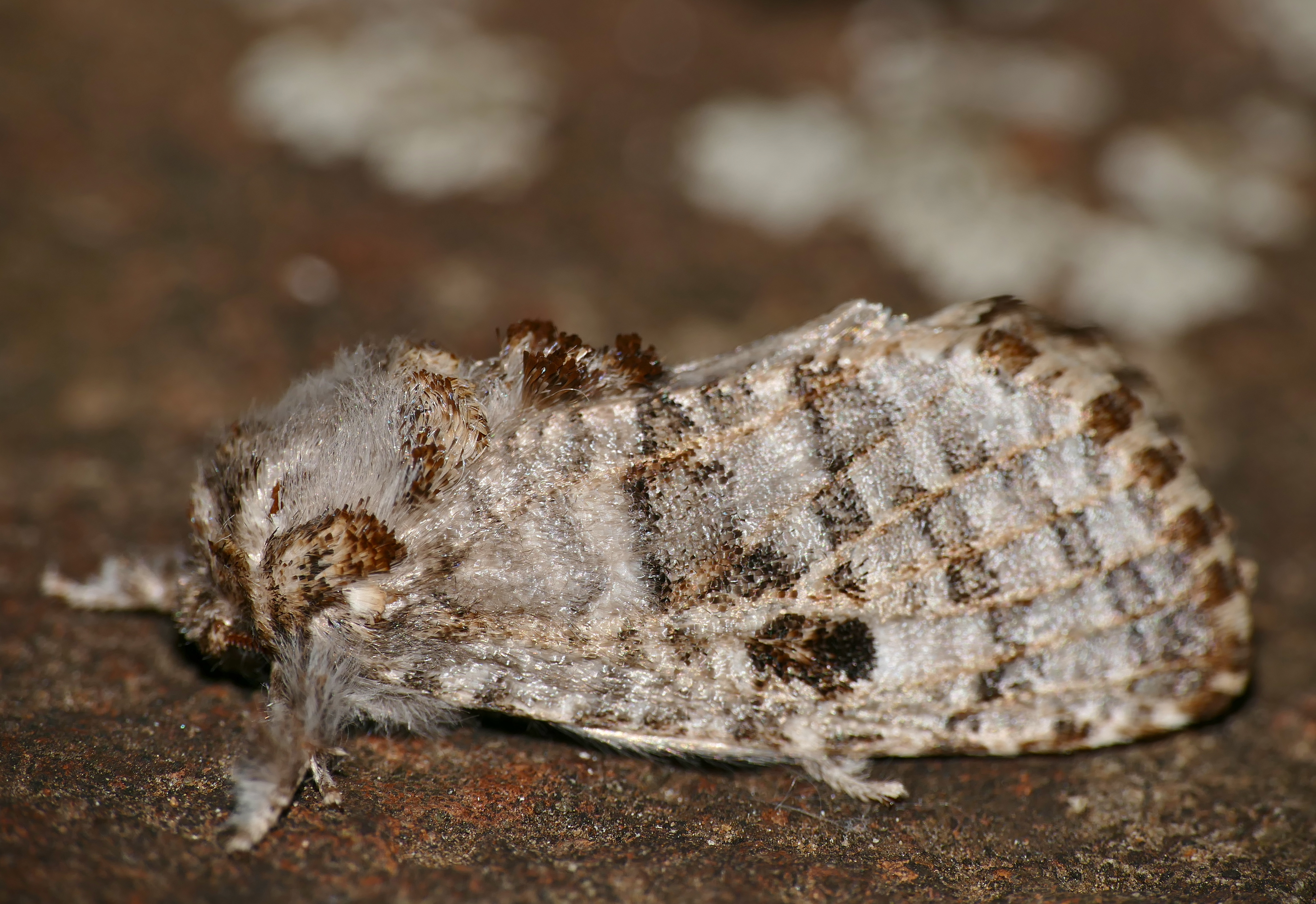

Scientific classification
- Kingdom: Animalia
- Phylum: Arthropoda
- Class: Insecta
- Order: Lepidoptera
- Family: Cossidae
- Genus: Salagena
- Species: S. obsolescens

Binomial name
- Salagena obsolescens Hampson, 1910

= Salagena obsolescens =

Species of moth

Salagena obsolescens is a moth in the family Cossidae. It is found in South Africa.

The larvae possibly feed on Sonneratia alba.
