= Salagena bennybytebieri =

Scientific classification
- Domain: Eukaryota
- Kingdom: Animalia
- Phylum: Arthropoda
- Class: Insecta
- Order: Lepidoptera
- Family: Cossidae
- Genus: Salagena
- Species: S. bennybytebieri

Binomial name
- Salagena bennybytebieri Lehmann, 2008

Species of moth

Salagena bennybytebieri is a moth in the family Cossidae. It is found in central Kenya. The habitat consists of dry submontane forests.

The length of the forewings is about 8 mm for males and 8.5 mm for females.
