= Trichaeta orientalis =

Scientific classification
- Domain: Eukaryota
- Kingdom: Animalia
- Phylum: Arthropoda
- Class: Insecta
- Order: Lepidoptera
- Superfamily: Noctuoidea
- Family: Erebidae
- Subfamily: Arctiinae
- Genus: Trichaeta
- Species: T. orientalis

Binomial name
- Trichaeta orientalis Szent-Ivány, 1942

Species of moth

Trichaeta orientalis is a moth in the subfamily Arctiinae. It was described by József Gyula Hubertus Szent-Ivány in 1942. It is found in Tanzania.
