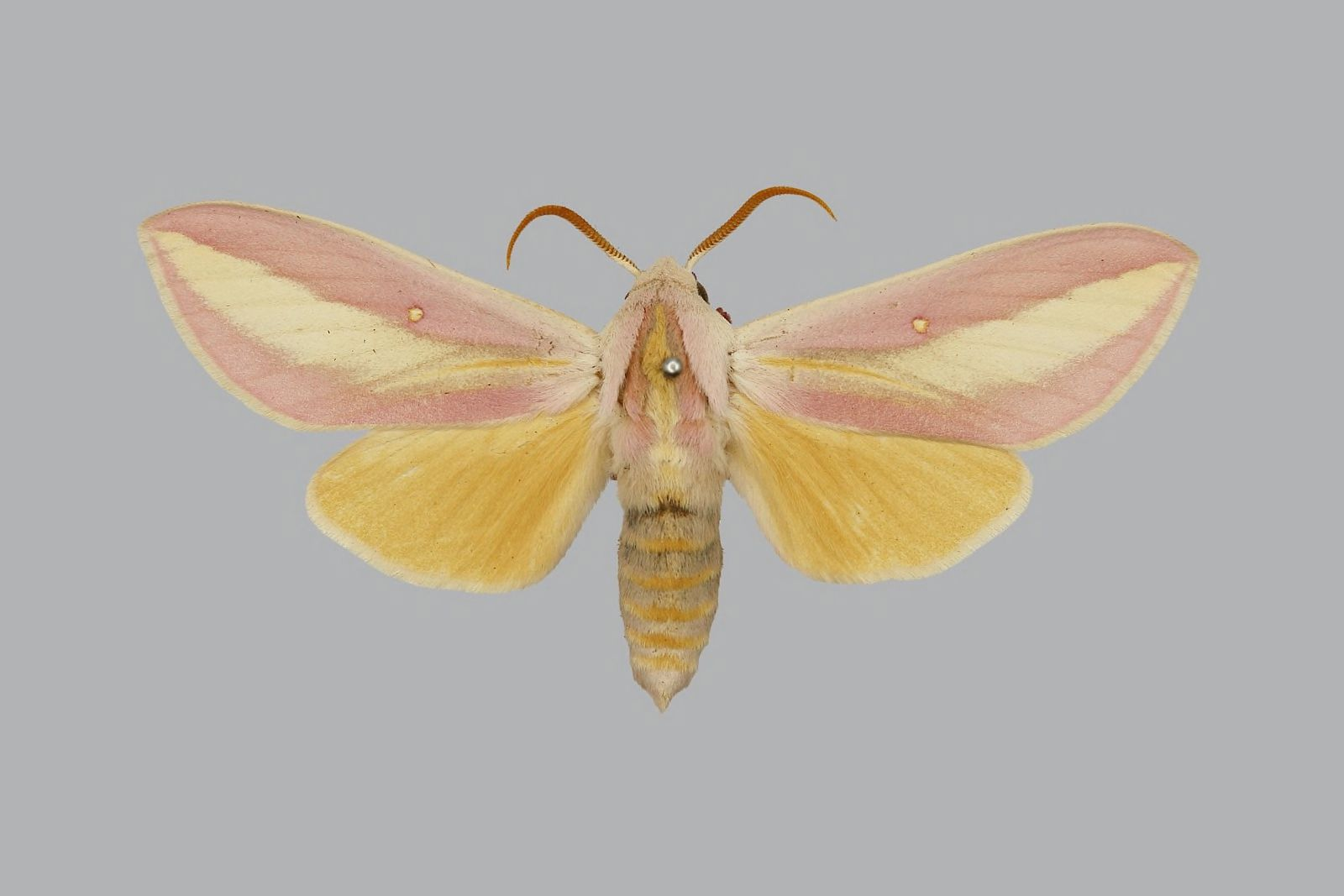

Scientific classification
- Domain: Eukaryota
- Kingdom: Animalia
- Phylum: Arthropoda
- Class: Insecta
- Order: Lepidoptera
- Family: Sphingidae
- Genus: Leucophlebia
- Species: L. edentata

Binomial name
- Leucophlebia edentata Rothschild & Jordan, 1916

= Leucophlebia edentata =

Species of moth

Leucophlebia edentata is a moth of the family Sphingidae. It is found from Guinea east to Sudan and Uganda.
