= Trichaeta tigrina =

Scientific classification
- Kingdom: Animalia
- Phylum: Arthropoda
- Class: Insecta
- Order: Lepidoptera
- Superfamily: Noctuoidea
- Family: Erebidae
- Subfamily: Arctiinae
- Genus: Trichaeta
- Species: T. tigrina

Binomial name
- Trichaeta tigrina (Walker, [1865])

Synonyms
- Syntomis tigrina Walker, [1865]

Species of moth

Trichaeta tigrina is a moth in the subfamily Arctiinae. It was described by Francis Walker in 1865. It is found in Cambodia.
