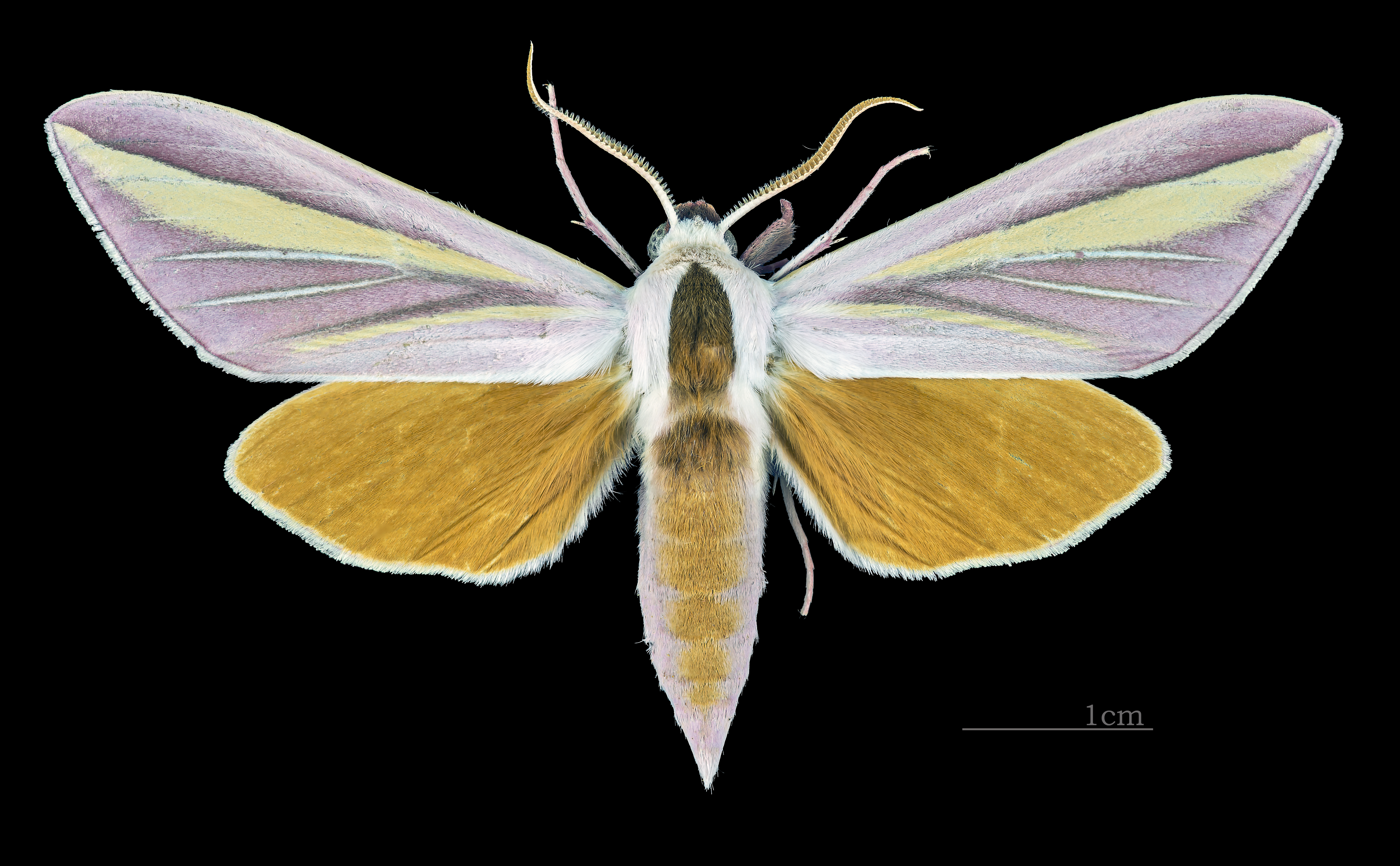
- Leucophlebia lineata

Scientific classification
- Domain: Eukaryota
- Kingdom: Animalia
- Phylum: Arthropoda
- Class: Insecta
- Order: Lepidoptera
- Family: Sphingidae
- Tribe: Smerinthini
- Genus: Leucophlebia; Westwood, 1847

Synonyms
- Afrophlebia Eitschberger, 2003; Indiaphlebia Eitschberger, 2003; Rasphele Boisduval, 1875; Thaiphlebia Eitschberger, 2003

= Leucophlebia =

Genus of moths

Leucophlebia is a genus of moths in the family Sphingidae first described by John O. Westwood in 1847.

== Species ==
The genus includes the following species:

- Leucophlebia afra Karsch, 1891
- Leucophlebia caecilie Eitschberger, 2003
- Leucophlebia edentata Rothschild & Jordan, 1916
- Leucophlebia emittens Walker, 1866
- Leucophlebia formosana Clark, 1936
- Leucophlebia frederkingi Eitschberger, 2003
- Leucophlebia hogenesi Eitschberger, 2003
- Leucophlebia lineata Westwood, 1847
- Leucophlebia muehlei Eitschberger, 2003
- Leucophlebia neumanni Rothschild, 1902
- Leucophlebia paul Eitschberger, 2003
- Leucophlebia pinratanai Eitschberger, 2003
- Leucophlebia rosacea Butler, 1875
- Leucophlebia schachti Eitschberger, 2003
- Leucophlebia vietnamensis Eitschberger, 2003
- Leucophlebia xanthopis Hampson, 1910
