= Acantharctia bivittata =

Scientific classification
- Kingdom: Animalia
- Phylum: Arthropoda
- Clade: Pancrustacea
- Class: Insecta
- Order: Lepidoptera
- Superfamily: Noctuoidea
- Family: Erebidae
- Subfamily: Arctiinae
- Genus: Acantharctia
- Species: A. bivittata

Binomial name
- Acantharctia bivittata (Butler, 1898)

Synonyms
- Aloa bivittata Butler, 1898

Species of moth

Acantharctia bivittata is a moth of the family Erebidae. It was described by Arthur Gardiner Butler in 1898. It is found in Kenya.
