= Salagena denigrata =

Scientific classification
- Domain: Eukaryota
- Kingdom: Animalia
- Phylum: Arthropoda
- Class: Insecta
- Order: Lepidoptera
- Family: Cossidae
- Genus: Salagena
- Species: S. denigrata

Binomial name
- Salagena denigrata Gaede, 1929

Species of moth

Salagena denigrata is a moth in the family Cossidae. It is found in the Republic of Congo.
