= Salagena guichardi =

Scientific classification
- Kingdom: Animalia
- Phylum: Arthropoda
- Class: Insecta
- Order: Lepidoptera
- Family: Cossidae
- Genus: Salagena
- Species: S. guichardi

Binomial name
- Salagena guichardi Wiltshire, 1980

Species of moth

Salagena guichardi is a moth in the family Cossidae. It is found in Oman and the United Arab Emirates.
