= Acantharctia latifusca =

Scientific classification
- Kingdom: Animalia
- Phylum: Arthropoda
- Class: Insecta
- Order: Lepidoptera
- Superfamily: Noctuoidea
- Family: Erebidae
- Subfamily: Arctiinae
- Genus: Acantharctia
- Species: A. latifusca

Binomial name
- Acantharctia latifusca (Hampson, 1907)

Synonyms
- Aglossosia latifusca Hampson, 1907; Acantharctia flavimarginata Rothschild, 1935; Acantharctia tenebrosa Rothschild, 1935

Species of moth

Acantharctia latifusca is a moth of the family Erebidae. It was described by George Hampson in 1907. It is found in Kenya and Uganda.
