= Acantharctia latifasciata =

Scientific classification
- Kingdom: Animalia
- Phylum: Arthropoda
- Class: Insecta
- Order: Lepidoptera
- Superfamily: Noctuoidea
- Family: Erebidae
- Subfamily: Arctiinae
- Genus: Acantharctia
- Species: A. latifasciata

Binomial name
- Acantharctia latifasciata Hampson, 1909

Species of moth

Acantharctia latifasciata is a moth of the family Erebidae. It was described by George Hampson in 1909. It is found in South Africa.
