= Trichaeta bivittata =

Scientific classification
- Kingdom: Animalia
- Phylum: Arthropoda
- Class: Insecta
- Order: Lepidoptera
- Superfamily: Noctuoidea
- Family: Erebidae
- Subfamily: Arctiinae
- Genus: Trichaeta
- Species: T. bivittata

Binomial name
- Trichaeta bivittata (Walker, [1865])

Synonyms
- Syntomis bivittata Walker, [1865]

Species of moth

Trichaeta bivittata is a moth in the subfamily Arctiinae. It was described by Francis Walker in 1865. It is found in Cameroon, the Democratic Republic of the Congo, Equatorial Guinea, Rwanda, Sierra Leone and the Gambia.
