= Salagena albovenosa =

Scientific classification
- Kingdom: Animalia
- Phylum: Arthropoda
- Clade: Pancrustacea
- Class: Insecta
- Order: Lepidoptera
- Family: Cossidae
- Genus: Salagena
- Species: S. albovenosa

Binomial name
- Salagena albovenosa Mey, 2011

Species of moth

Salagena albovenosa is a moth in the family Cossidae. It is found in Namibia and South Africa.
