= Leucophlebia vietnamensis =

Scientific classification
- Kingdom: Animalia
- Phylum: Arthropoda
- Class: Insecta
- Order: Lepidoptera
- Family: Sphingidae
- Genus: Leucophlebia
- Species: L. vietnamensis

Binomial name
- Leucophlebia vietnamensis Eitschberger, 2003

Species of moth

Leucophlebia vietnamensis is a moth of the family Sphingidae. It is known from Vietnam.
