= Salagena albonotata =

Scientific classification
- Domain: Eukaryota
- Kingdom: Animalia
- Phylum: Arthropoda
- Class: Insecta
- Order: Lepidoptera
- Family: Cossidae
- Genus: Salagena
- Species: S. albonotata

Binomial name
- Salagena albonotata (Butler, 1898)

Synonyms
- Arbela albonotata Butler, 1898

Species of moth

Salagena albonotata is a moth in the family Cossidae. It is found in Kenya.
