= Leucophlebia schachti =

Scientific classification
- Kingdom: Animalia
- Phylum: Arthropoda
- Class: Insecta
- Order: Lepidoptera
- Family: Sphingidae
- Genus: Leucophlebia
- Species: L. schachti

Binomial name
- Leucophlebia schachti Eitschberger, 2003

Species of moth

Leucophlebia schachti is a moth of the family Sphingidae. It is known from Nepal.
