= Leucophlebia formosana =

Scientific classification
- Domain: Eukaryota
- Kingdom: Animalia
- Phylum: Arthropoda
- Class: Insecta
- Order: Lepidoptera
- Family: Sphingidae
- Genus: Leucophlebia
- Species: L. formosana

Binomial name
- Leucophlebia formosana Clark, 1936

Synonyms
- Leucophlebia lineata brunnea Closs, 1915; Leucophlebia lineata formosana Clark, 1936

Species of moth

Leucophlebia formosana is a moth of the family Sphingidae. It is known from China and Taiwan.

== Subspecies ==
- Leucophlebia formosana formosana (Taiwan)
- Leucophlebia formosana chinaensis Eitschberger, 2003 (Shandong in China)
