= Estigmene internigralis =

Scientific classification
- Kingdom: Animalia
- Phylum: Arthropoda
- Class: Insecta
- Order: Lepidoptera
- Superfamily: Noctuoidea
- Family: Erebidae
- Subfamily: Arctiinae
- Genus: Estigmene
- Species: E. internigralis

Binomial name
- Estigmene internigralis Hampson, 1905

Species of moth

Estigmene internigralis is a moth of the family Erebidae. It was described by George Hampson in 1905. It is found in Angola and South Africa.
