= Acantharctia vittata =

Scientific classification
- Domain: Eukaryota
- Kingdom: Animalia
- Phylum: Arthropoda
- Class: Insecta
- Order: Lepidoptera
- Superfamily: Noctuoidea
- Family: Erebidae
- Subfamily: Arctiinae
- Genus: Acantharctia
- Species: A. vittata

Binomial name
- Acantharctia vittata Aurivillius, 1899

Species of moth

Acantharctia vittata is a moth of the family Erebidae. It was described by Per Olof Christopher Aurivillius in 1899 and is found in Botswana and South Africa.
