= Salagena reticulata =

Scientific classification
- Domain: Eukaryota
- Kingdom: Animalia
- Phylum: Arthropoda
- Class: Insecta
- Order: Lepidoptera
- Family: Cossidae
- Genus: Salagena
- Species: S. reticulata

Binomial name
- Salagena reticulata Janse, 1925

Species of moth

Salagena reticulata is a moth in the family Cossidae. It is found in South Africa.
