= Salagena transversa =

Scientific classification
- Kingdom: Animalia
- Phylum: Arthropoda
- Class: Insecta
- Order: Lepidoptera
- Family: Cossidae
- Genus: Salagena
- Species: S. transversa

Binomial name
- Salagena transversa Walker, 1865

Synonyms
- Pettigramma spiculata Karsch, 1895; Catarbela strigosa Aurivillius, 1901

Species of moth

Salagena transversa is a moth in the family Cossidae. It is found in the Republic of Congo, the Democratic Republic of Congo, Sierra Leone, South Africa and Togo.
