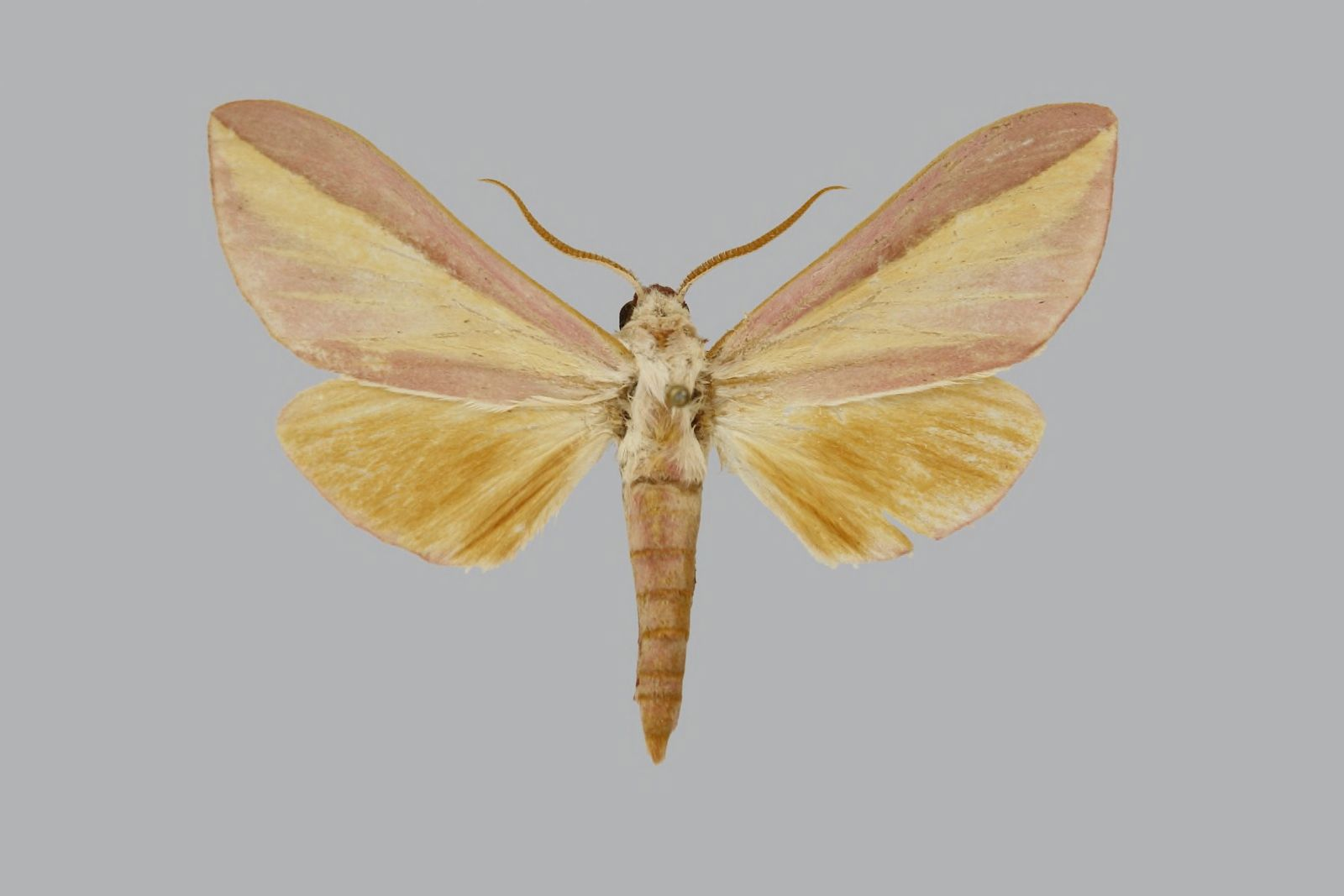

Scientific classification
- Kingdom: Animalia
- Phylum: Arthropoda
- Class: Insecta
- Order: Lepidoptera
- Family: Sphingidae
- Genus: Leucophlebia
- Species: L. frederkingi

Binomial name
- Leucophlebia frederkingi Eitschberger, 2003

= Leucophlebia frederkingi =

Species of moth

Leucophlebia frederkingi is a moth of the family Sphingidae. It is known from Thailand.
