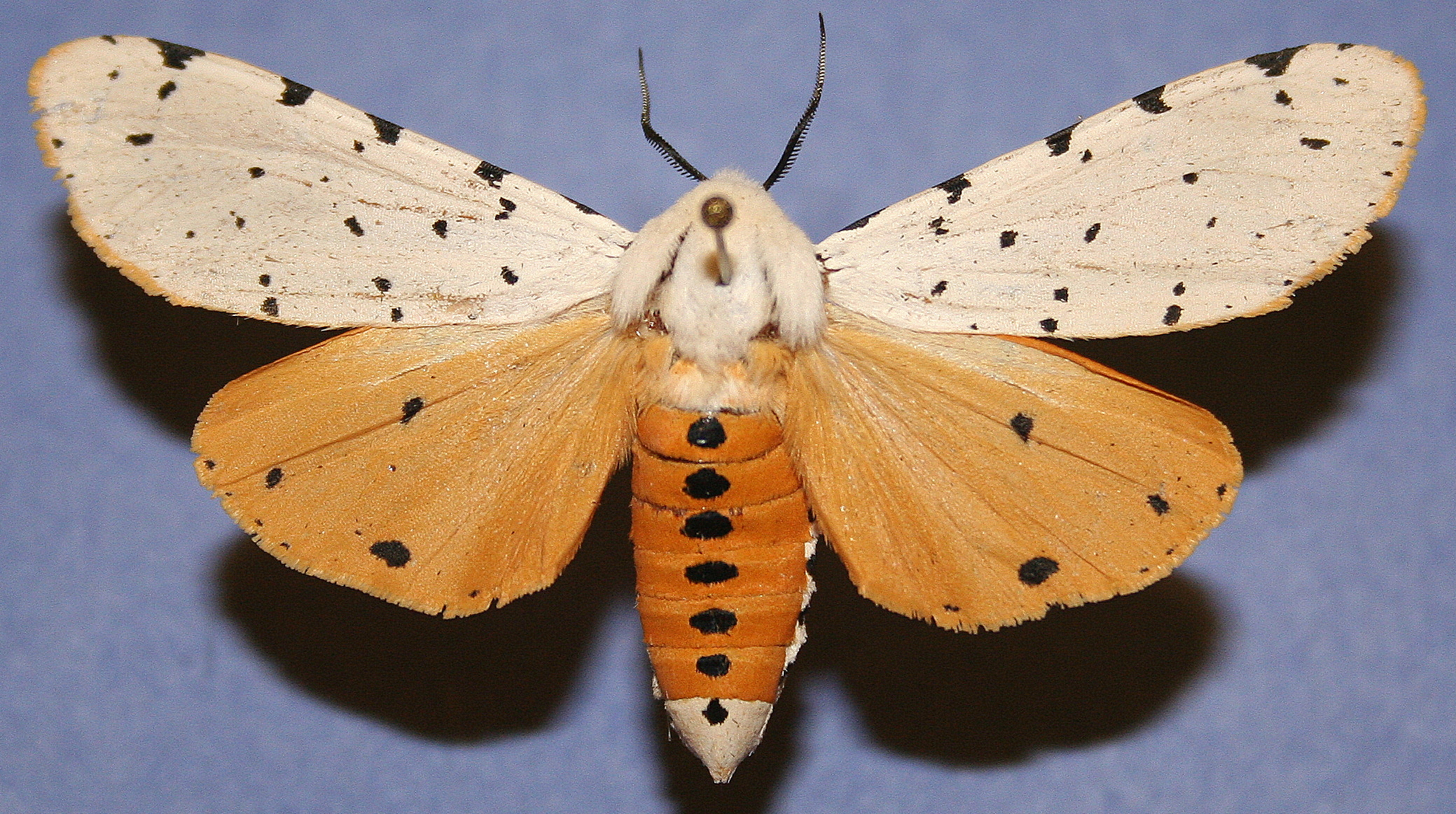

Scientific classification
- Kingdom: Animalia
- Phylum: Arthropoda
- Class: Insecta
- Order: Lepidoptera
- Superfamily: Noctuoidea
- Family: Erebidae
- Subfamily: Arctiinae
- Genus: Estigmene
- Species: E. acrea

Binomial name
- Estigmene acrea (Drury, 1773)

Synonyms
- Phalaena acrea Drury, 1773; Diacrisia mombasana Rothschild, 1910; Bombyx caprotina Drury, 1773; Arctia pseuderminea Harris, 1823; Arctia pseuderminea Harris, 1841; Leucarctia californica Packard, 1864; Leucarctia packardii Schaupp, 1882; Leucarctia rickseckeri Behr, 1893; Estigmene acraea var. klagesi Ehrmann, 1894; Spilosoma mexicana Walker, [1865]; Leucarctia acraea

= Estigmene acrea =

Salt marsh moth

Species of moth

Estigmene acrea, the salt marsh moth or acrea moth, is a moth in the family Erebidae. The species was first described by Dru Drury in 1773. It is found in North America, and southwards from Mexico to Colombia.

== Description ==
The head and thorax are white, and the abdomen is yellow orange with a row of black spots. The forewing is white with a variable pattern of black spots, with some individuals lacking any spots. The hindwing is yellow orange in males and white in females. Both sexes have three or four black spots or blotches on the hindwings. The wingspan measures 4.5 to 6.8 cm (1.8 to 2.7 in).

== Flight ==
This moth is generally seen from May to August, but it is seen all year in southern Florida and southern Texas.

== Life cycle ==
The yellowish eggs are laid in clusters on the host plant leaves. The larva, known as the salt marsh caterpillar, which grows to about 5 cm (2 in) in length, is highly variable in color, ranging from pale yellow to rusty orange brown to dark brownish black. It is hairy, with numerous soft setae, growing in tufts (several tufts on each segment), with a few individual hairs that are longer toward the end of the body. The thoracic and abdominal segments have a few rows of orange or black warts, and it has one tiny white dot per segment, on both sides of its body. It pupates in a cocoon, made in part from its own hair, usually by wrapping itself in a leaf or other debris. While inside the cocoon, it remains a larva through the winter, pupates in spring, and emerges as an adult in late spring. In the southern parts of its range, it may have several generations per year.

== Host plants ==
Host plants used by the caterpillar include dandelions, cabbage, cotton, walnuts, apple, tobacco, pea, potato, clovers, and maize.

The moth does not seem to be affected by any type of pyrrolizidine alkaloid present in many plant families, including the borage, legume, dogbane, and orchid families, and the tribes Senecioneae and Eupatorieae of the aster family. It is insensitive to alkaloids due to its pyrrolizidine alkaloid-specific taste receptors. It can detoxify them and even convert them into sex pheromones.

== Subspecies ==
- Estigmene acrea acrea
- Estigmene acrea mexicana (Walker, [1865}) (Mexico)
- Estigmene acrea columbiana Rothschild, 1910 (Colombia)

== Gallery ==
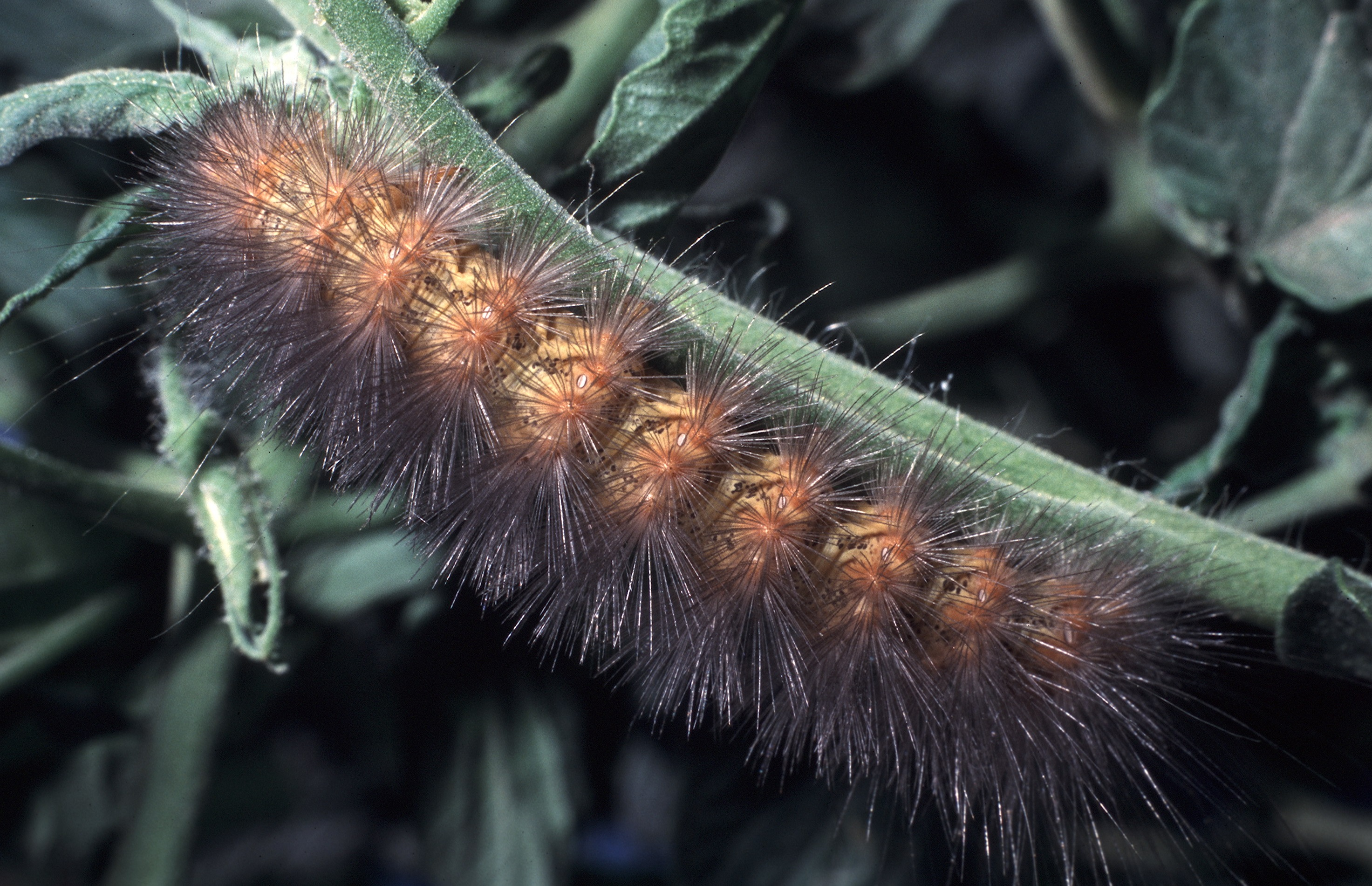
Caterpillar

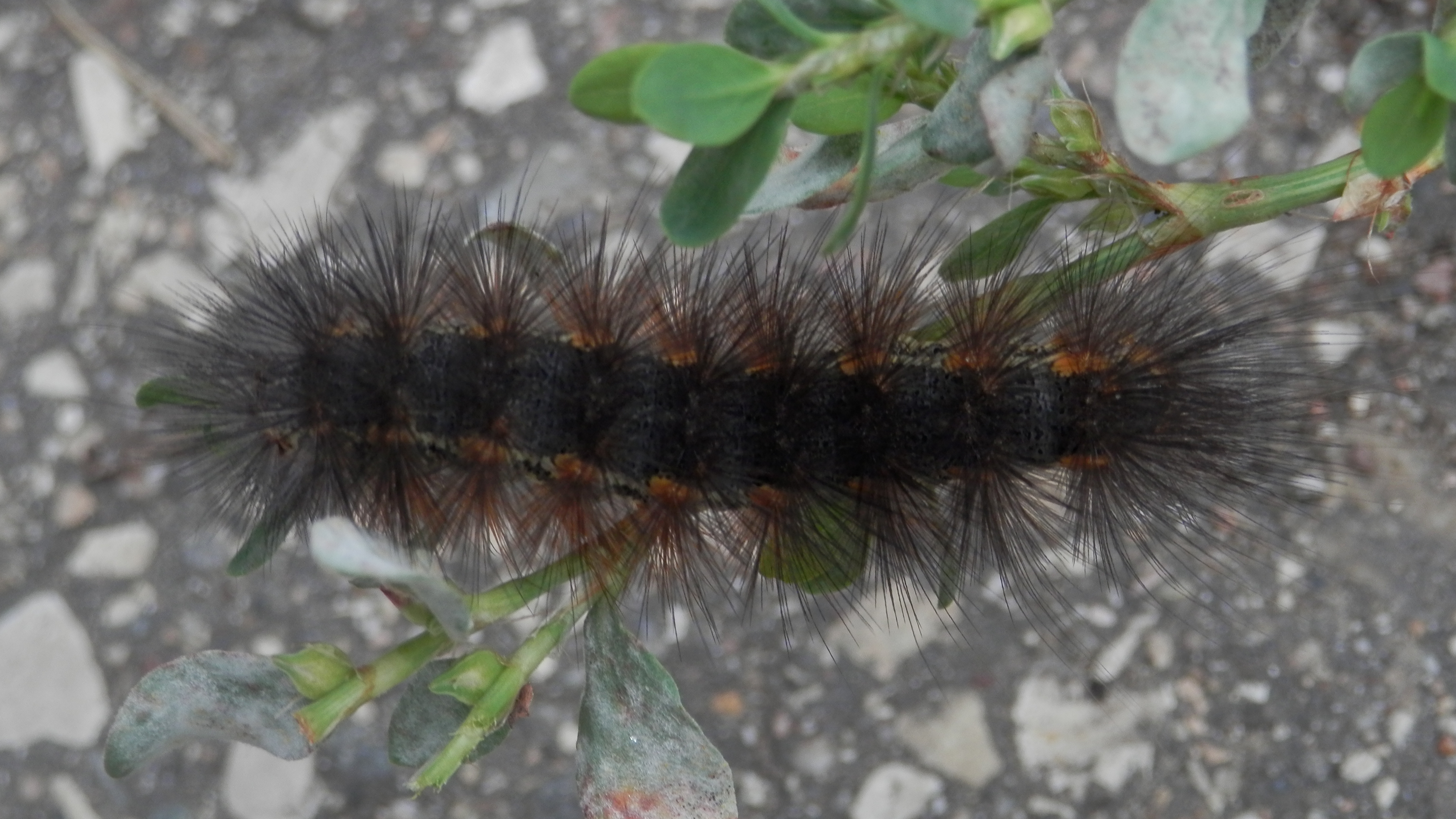
Dorsal view of larva

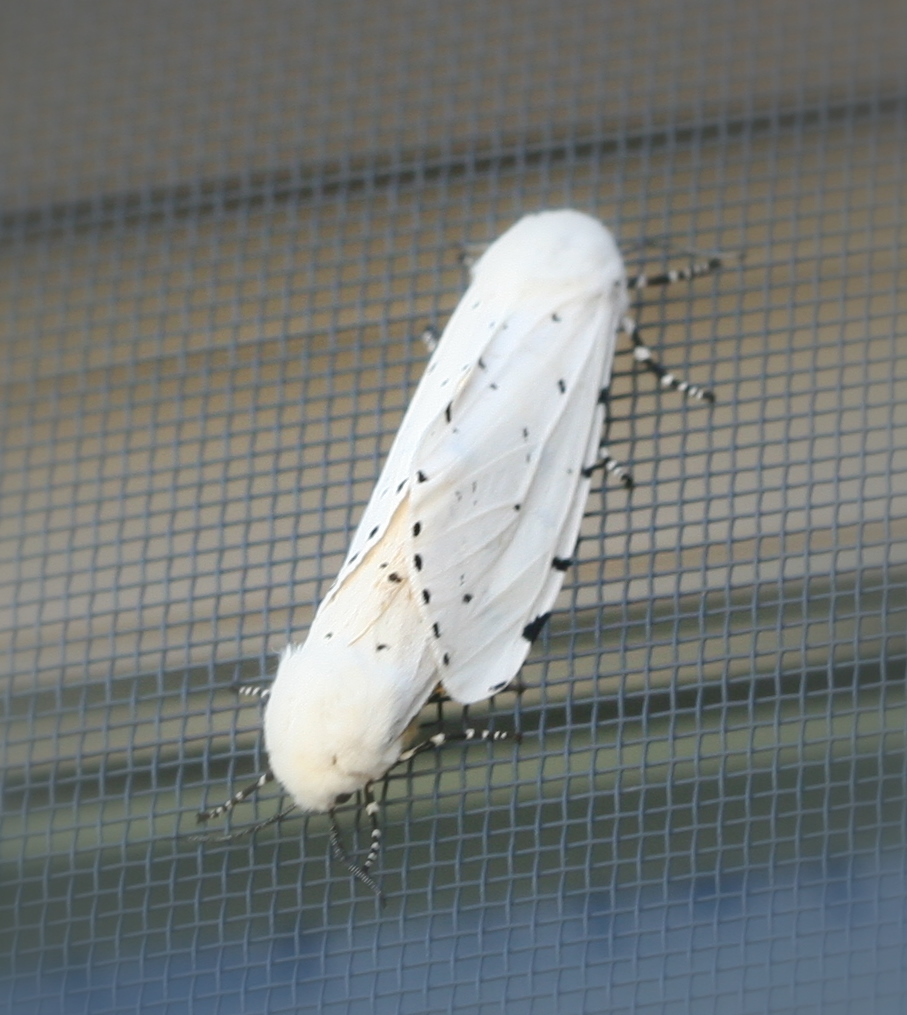
Mating

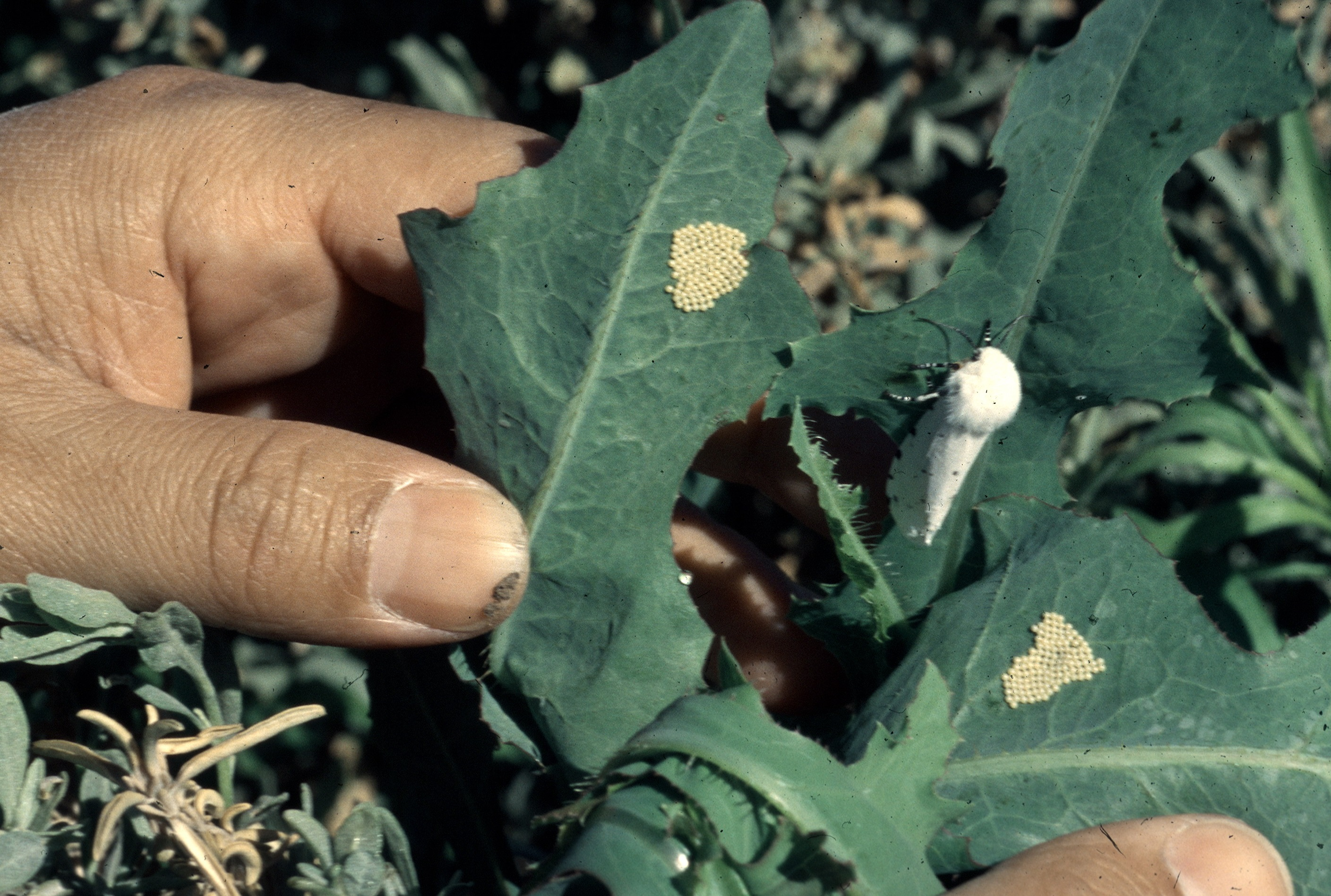
Adult and egg masses
