= Acantharctia nigrivena =

Scientific classification
- Domain: Eukaryota
- Kingdom: Animalia
- Phylum: Arthropoda
- Class: Insecta
- Order: Lepidoptera
- Superfamily: Noctuoidea
- Family: Erebidae
- Subfamily: Arctiinae
- Genus: Acantharctia
- Species: A. nigrivena

Binomial name
- Acantharctia nigrivena Rothschild, 1935

Species of moth

Acantharctia nigrivena is a moth of the family Erebidae. It was described by Rothschild in 1935. It is found in Ethiopia, Kenya, Malawi and Tanzania.
