= Leucophlebia rosacea =

Scientific classification
- Domain: Eukaryota
- Kingdom: Animalia
- Phylum: Arthropoda
- Class: Insecta
- Order: Lepidoptera
- Family: Sphingidae
- Genus: Leucophlebia
- Species: L. rosacea

Binomial name
- Leucophlebia rosacea Butler, 1875

Species of moth

Leucophlebia rosacea is a moth of the family Sphingidae. It is known from India.
