= Estigmene atrifascia =

Scientific classification
- Kingdom: Animalia
- Phylum: Arthropoda
- Class: Insecta
- Order: Lepidoptera
- Superfamily: Noctuoidea
- Family: Erebidae
- Subfamily: Arctiinae
- Genus: Estigmene
- Species: E. atrifascia

Binomial name
- Estigmene atrifascia (Hampson, 1907)

Synonyms
- Antarctia atrifascia Hampson, 1907

Species of moth

Estigmene atrifascia is a moth of the family Erebidae. It was described by George Hampson in 1907. It is found in Kenya.
