= Acantharctia flavicosta =

Scientific classification
- Kingdom: Animalia
- Phylum: Arthropoda
- Class: Insecta
- Order: Lepidoptera
- Superfamily: Noctuoidea
- Family: Erebidae
- Subfamily: Arctiinae
- Genus: Acantharctia
- Species: A. flavicosta

Binomial name
- Acantharctia flavicosta (Hampson, 1900)

Synonyms
- Amsacta flavicosta Hampson, 1900; Acantharctia aurivillii Bartel, 1903

Species of moth

Acantharctia flavicosta is a moth of the family Erebidae. It was described by George Hampson in 1900. It is found in Uganda and Zimbabwe.
