= Estigmene sabulosa =

Scientific classification
- Kingdom: Animalia
- Phylum: Arthropoda
- Class: Insecta
- Order: Lepidoptera
- Superfamily: Noctuoidea
- Family: Erebidae
- Subfamily: Arctiinae
- Genus: Estigmene
- Species: E. sabulosa

Binomial name
- Estigmene sabulosa Romieux, 1943

Species of moth

Estigmene sabulosa is a moth of the family Erebidae. It was described by Romieux in 1943. It is found in the Democratic Republic of Congo and Zambia.
