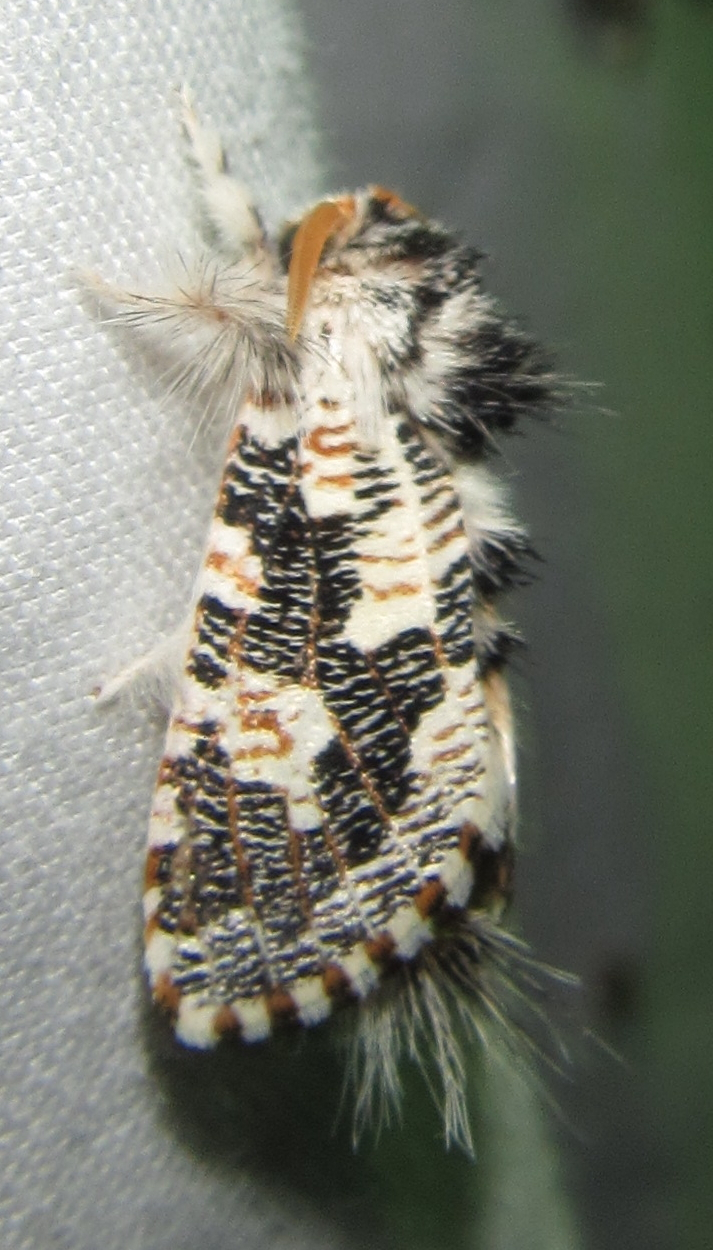

Scientific classification
- Domain: Eukaryota
- Kingdom: Animalia
- Phylum: Arthropoda
- Class: Insecta
- Order: Lepidoptera
- Family: Cossidae
- Genus: Salagena
- Species: S. tessellata

Binomial name
- Salagena tessellata Distant, 1897

= Salagena tessellata =

Species of moth

Salagena tessellata is a moth in the family Cossidae. It is found in Kenya, South Africa and Tanzania.
