= Leucophlebia muehlei =

Scientific classification
- Kingdom: Animalia
- Phylum: Arthropoda
- Class: Insecta
- Order: Lepidoptera
- Family: Sphingidae
- Genus: Leucophlebia
- Species: L. muehlei

Binomial name
- Leucophlebia muehlei Eitschberger, 2003

Species of moth

Leucophlebia muehlei is a moth of the family Sphingidae. It is known from Rwanda.
