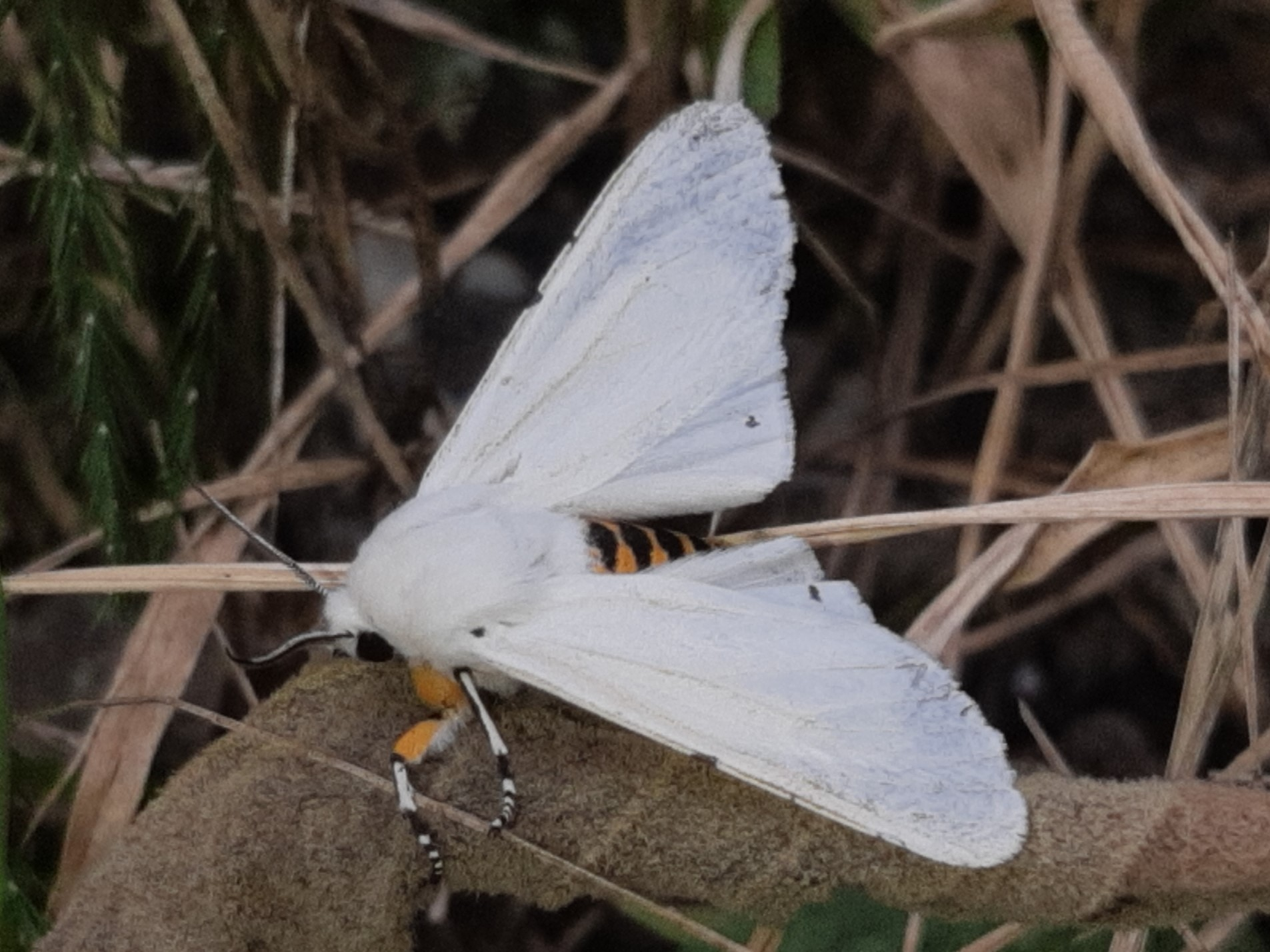

Scientific classification
- Domain: Eukaryota
- Kingdom: Animalia
- Phylum: Arthropoda
- Class: Insecta
- Order: Lepidoptera
- Superfamily: Noctuoidea
- Family: Erebidae
- Subfamily: Arctiinae
- Genus: Estigmene
- Species: E. albida

Binomial name
- Estigmene albida (Stretch, 1874)

Synonyms
- Leucarctia albida Stretch, 1874; Estigmene acraea arizonensis Rothschild, 1910; Estigmene alba Rothschild, 1910 (Missp.)

= Estigmene albida =

Species of moth

Estigmene albida is a species of moth in the family Erebidae. It was described by Richard Harper Stretch in 1874. It is found in the United States from Montana to South Dakota, south to New Mexico and Arizona. It is also found in Mexico, Costa Rica and Guatemala.

The wingspan is about 50 mm.
