= Estigmene multivittata =

Scientific classification
- Domain: Eukaryota
- Kingdom: Animalia
- Phylum: Arthropoda
- Class: Insecta
- Order: Lepidoptera
- Superfamily: Noctuoidea
- Family: Erebidae
- Subfamily: Arctiinae
- Genus: Estigmene
- Species: E. multivittata

Binomial name
- Estigmene multivittata Rothschild, 1910

Species of insect

Estigmene multivittata is a moth of the family Erebidae. It was described by Rothschild in 1910. It lives in Ethiopia, Kenya and South Africa.
