= Trichaeta aurantiobasis =

Scientific classification
- Domain: Eukaryota
- Kingdom: Animalia
- Phylum: Arthropoda
- Class: Insecta
- Order: Lepidoptera
- Superfamily: Noctuoidea
- Family: Erebidae
- Subfamily: Arctiinae
- Genus: Trichaeta
- Species: T. aurantiobasis

Binomial name
- Trichaeta aurantiobasis (Rothschild, 1910)

Synonyms
- Ceryx aurantiobasis Rothschild, 1910

Species of moth

Trichaeta aurantiobasis is a moth in the subfamily Arctiinae. It was described by Walter Rothschild in 1910. It is found in Papua, Indonesia, where it is only known from Fakfak.
