= Estigmene angustipennis =

Scientific classification
- Kingdom: Animalia
- Phylum: Arthropoda
- Class: Insecta
- Order: Lepidoptera
- Superfamily: Noctuoidea
- Family: Erebidae
- Subfamily: Arctiinae
- Genus: Estigmene
- Species: E. angustipennis

Binomial name
- Estigmene angustipennis (Walker, 1855)

Synonyms
- Antheua angustipennis Walker, 1855

Species of moth

Estigmene angustipennis is a moth of the family Erebidae. It was described by 1855. It is found in South Africa.
