= Neromia =

Scientific classification
- Kingdom: Animalia
- Phylum: Arthropoda
- Class: Insecta
- Order: Lepidoptera
- Family: Geometridae
- Subfamily: Geometrinae
- Genus: Neromia; Staudinger, 1898

Genus of moths

Neromia is a genus of moths in the family Geometridae first described by Staudinger in 1898.

== Species ==
Some species of this genus are:

- Neromia activa Prout, 1930
- Neromia barretti Prout, 1912
- Neromia chlorosticta Prout, 1912
- Neromia clavicornis Prout, 1915
- Neromia cohaerens Prout, 1916
- Neromia enotes Prout, 1917
- Neromia impostura Prout, 1915
- Neromia integrata Hausmann, 2009
- Neromia manderensis Prout, 1916
- Neromia phoenicosticta Prout, 1912
- Neromia picticosta Prout, 1913
- Neromia propinquilinea Prout, 1920
- Neromia pulvereisparsa (Hampson, 1896)
- Neromia quieta (Prout, 1912)
- Neromia rhodomadia Prout, 1922
- Neromia rubripunctilla Prout, 1912
- Neromia simplexa Brandt, 1938
- Neromia strigulosa Prout, 1925
