= Salagena ngazidya =

Scientific classification
- Kingdom: Animalia
- Phylum: Arthropoda
- Class: Insecta
- Order: Lepidoptera
- Family: Cossidae
- Genus: Salagena
- Species: S. ngazidya

Binomial name
- Salagena ngazidya (Viette, 1981)

Synonyms
- Metarbelodes ngazidya Viette, 1981

Species of moth

Salagena ngazidya is a moth in the family Cossidae. It is found on the Comoros.
