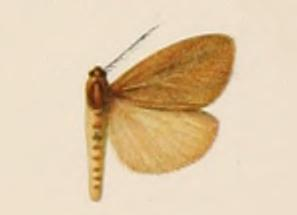

Scientific classification
- Domain: Eukaryota
- Kingdom: Animalia
- Phylum: Arthropoda
- Class: Insecta
- Order: Lepidoptera
- Superfamily: Noctuoidea
- Family: Erebidae
- Subfamily: Arctiinae
- Genus: Estigmene
- Species: E. ochreomarginata

Binomial name
- Estigmene ochreomarginata Bethune-Baker, 1909

Synonyms
- Amsacta ansorgei Rothschild, 1910

= Estigmene ochreomarginata =

Species of moth

Estigmene ochreomarginata is a moth of the family Erebidae. It is found in the Democratic Republic of Congo, Kenya, Sierra Leone, Tanzania and Uganda.
