= Leucophlebia caecilie =

Scientific classification
- Kingdom: Animalia
- Phylum: Arthropoda
- Class: Insecta
- Order: Lepidoptera
- Family: Sphingidae
- Genus: Leucophlebia
- Species: L. caecilie

Binomial name
- Leucophlebia caecilie Eitschberger, 2003

Species of moth

Leucophlebia caecilie is a moth of the family Sphingidae. It is known from Cameroon.
