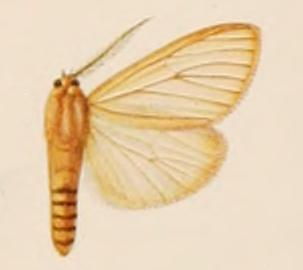

Scientific classification
- Kingdom: Animalia
- Phylum: Arthropoda
- Class: Insecta
- Order: Lepidoptera
- Superfamily: Noctuoidea
- Family: Erebidae
- Subfamily: Arctiinae
- Genus: Estigmene
- Species: E. neuriastis

Binomial name
- Estigmene neuriastis Hampson, 1907

Synonyms
- Acantharctia pembertoni Rothschild, 1910; Estigmene pembertoni

= Estigmene neuriastis =

Species of moth

Estigmene neuriastis is a moth of the family Erebidae. It is found in Angola, the Democratic Republic of Congo and Zambia.
