= Neromia picticosta =

Scientific classification
- Kingdom: Animalia
- Phylum: Arthropoda
- Clade: Pancrustacea
- Class: Insecta
- Order: Lepidoptera
- Family: Geometridae
- Genus: Neromia
- Species: N. picticosta

Binomial name
- Neromia picticosta Prout, 1913

Species of moth

Neromia picticosta is a moth of the family Geometridae first described by Louis Beethoven Prout in 1913. It is found in Madagascar.

It has a wingspan of 22 mm. The wings are dull bluish green, irrorated (sprinkled) with white. The face is dark red, the thorax and abdomen dorsally green.

This species was described from a specimen from Antananarivo.
