= Estigmene ansorgei =

Scientific classification
- Kingdom: Animalia
- Phylum: Arthropoda
- Class: Insecta
- Order: Lepidoptera
- Superfamily: Noctuoidea
- Family: Erebidae
- Subfamily: Arctiinae
- Genus: Estigmene
- Species: E. ansorgei

Binomial name
- Estigmene ansorgei Rothschild, 1910

Synonyms
- Estigmene similis Rothschild, 1910; Amsacta ochreolutescens Kiriakoff, 1954

Species of moth

Estigmene ansorgei is a moth of the family Erebidae. It was described by Rothschild in 1910. It is found in Burundi, the Democratic Republic of Congo, Kenya, Rwanda, Tanzania, Uganda and Zambia.
