= Salagena eustrigata =

Scientific classification
- Kingdom: Animalia
- Phylum: Arthropoda
- Class: Insecta
- Order: Lepidoptera
- Family: Cossidae
- Genus: Salagena
- Species: S. eustrigata

Binomial name
- Salagena eustrigata Hampson, 1916

Species of moth

Salagena eustrigata is a moth in the family Cossidae. It is found in Kenya.
