= Trichaeta quadriplagata =

Scientific classification
- Kingdom: Animalia
- Phylum: Arthropoda
- Class: Insecta
- Order: Lepidoptera
- Superfamily: Noctuoidea
- Family: Erebidae
- Subfamily: Arctiinae
- Genus: Trichaeta
- Species: T. quadriplagata

Binomial name
- Trichaeta quadriplagata (Snellen, 1895)

Synonyms
- Syntomis quadriplagata Snellen, 1895

Species of moth

Trichaeta quadriplagata is a moth in the subfamily Arctiinae. It was described by Pieter Cornelius Tobias Snellen in 1895. It is found on Sumatra.

== Bibliography ==
- Pitkin, Brian & Jenkins, Paul. "Search results Family: Arctiidae". Butterflies and Moths of the World. Natural History Museum, London.
