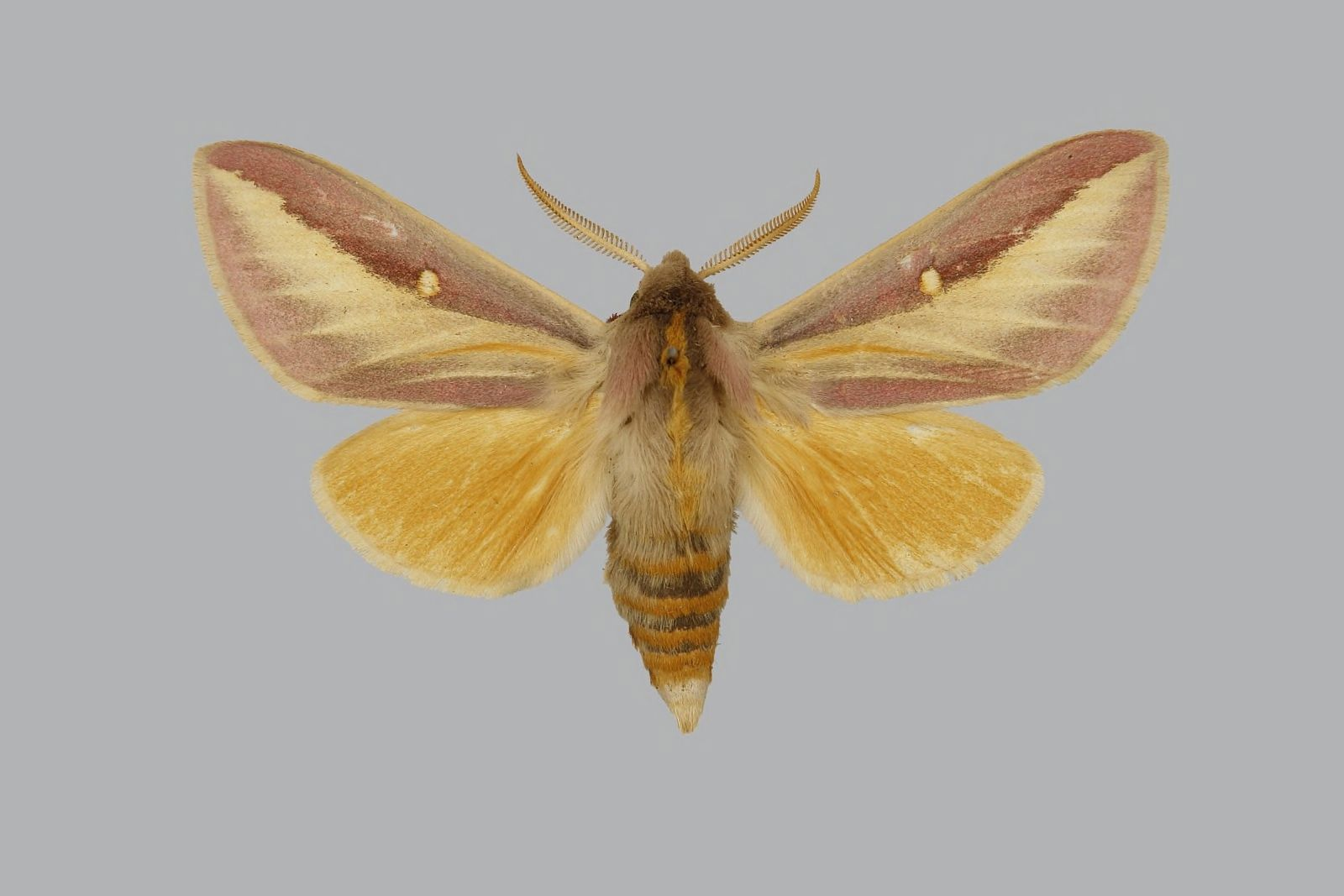
- Leucophlebia xanthopis, male, upperside. Tanzania, S. Tang. Terr., Mbeya

Scientific classification
- Domain: Eukaryota
- Kingdom: Animalia
- Phylum: Arthropoda
- Class: Insecta
- Order: Lepidoptera
- Family: Sphingidae
- Genus: Leucophlebia
- Species: L. xanthopis

Binomial name
- Leucophlebia xanthopis Hampson, 1910

Synonyms
- Leucophlebia afra rosulenta Rothschild & Jordan, 1916

= Leucophlebia xanthopis =

Species of moth

Leucophlebia xanthopis is a moth of the family Sphingidae. It is known from the Democratic Republic of the Congo and Tanzania.
