= Leucophlebia pinratanai =

Scientific classification
- Kingdom: Animalia
- Phylum: Arthropoda
- Class: Insecta
- Order: Lepidoptera
- Family: Sphingidae
- Genus: Leucophlebia
- Species: L. pinratanai

Binomial name
- Leucophlebia pinratanai Eitschberger, 2003

Species of moth

Leucophlebia pinratanai is a moth of the family Sphingidae. It is found in Thailand.
