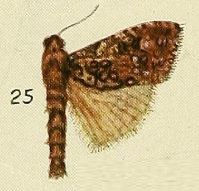
- Salagena narses

Scientific classification
- Domain: Eukaryota
- Kingdom: Animalia
- Phylum: Arthropoda
- Class: Insecta
- Order: Lepidoptera
- Family: Cossidae
- Genus: Salagena
- Species: S. narses

Binomial name
- Salagena narses Fawcett, 1916

= Salagena narses =

Species of moth

Salagena narses is a moth in the family Cossidae. It is found in Kenya.
