= Amsacta bicoloria =

Scientific classification
- Kingdom: Animalia
- Phylum: Arthropoda
- Class: Insecta
- Order: Lepidoptera
- Superfamily: Noctuoidea
- Family: Erebidae
- Subfamily: Arctiinae
- Genus: Amsacta
- Species: A. bicoloria

Binomial name
- Amsacta bicoloria (Gaede, 1916)

Synonyms
- Acantharctia bicoloria Gaede, 1916; Estigmene stygioides Rothschild, 1916

Species of moth

Amsacta bicoloria is a moth of the family Erebidae. It was described by Max Gaede in 1916. It is found in Ghana, Cameroon and Nigeria.
