= Estigmene flaviceps =

Scientific classification
- Kingdom: Animalia
- Phylum: Arthropoda
- Class: Insecta
- Order: Lepidoptera
- Superfamily: Noctuoidea
- Family: Erebidae
- Subfamily: Arctiinae
- Genus: Estigmene
- Species: E. flaviceps

Binomial name
- Estigmene flaviceps Hampson, 1907

Synonyms
- Acantharctia aureacosta Bethune-Baker, 1911

Species of moth

Estigmene flaviceps is a species of moth of the family Erebidae. It was described by George Hampson in 1907. It is found in Angola, Ghana, Senegal and Sierra Leone.
