= Estigmene testaceoflava =

Scientific classification
- Domain: Eukaryota
- Kingdom: Animalia
- Phylum: Arthropoda
- Class: Insecta
- Order: Lepidoptera
- Superfamily: Noctuoidea
- Family: Erebidae
- Subfamily: Arctiinae
- Genus: Estigmene
- Species: E. testaceoflava

Binomial name
- Estigmene testaceoflava Rothschild, 1933

Species of moth

Estigmene testaceoflava is a species of moth of the family Erebidae. It was described by Rothschild in 1933. It is found in Senegal.
