= Acantharctia mundata =

Scientific classification
- Kingdom: Animalia
- Phylum: Arthropoda
- Class: Insecta
- Order: Lepidoptera
- Superfamily: Noctuoidea
- Family: Erebidae
- Subfamily: Arctiinae
- Genus: Acantharctia
- Species: A. mundata

Binomial name
- Acantharctia mundata (Walker, [1865])

Synonyms
- Halesidota mundata Walker, [1865]; Acantharctia lacteata Rothschild, 1933; Diacrisia atridorsia Hampson, 1920; Amsacta rattrayi Rothschild, 1910

Species of moth

Acantharctia mundata is a species of moth of the family Erebidae. It was described by Francis Walker in 1865. It is found in the Democratic Republic of the Congo, Gabon, Ghana, Ivory Coast, Nigeria, Sierra Leone, the Gambia and Uganda.
