= Neromia propinquilinea =

Scientific classification
- Kingdom: Animalia
- Phylum: Arthropoda
- Clade: Pancrustacea
- Class: Insecta
- Order: Lepidoptera
- Family: Geometridae
- Genus: Neromia
- Species: N. propinquilinea

Binomial name
- Neromia propinquilinea Prout, 1920

Species of moth

Neromia propinquilinea is a moth of the family Geometridae first described by Louis Beethoven Prout in 1920. It is found in Sénégal.

It has a wingspan of 27–32 mm. The forewings are bright light green with some scattered metallic-blue scales and with whitish strigulations (fine streaks). The underside is much paler, unmarked and a whitish blue-green. On both wings there is a very faint and minute reddish cell-dot. This species was described from a specimen from Sédhiou.
