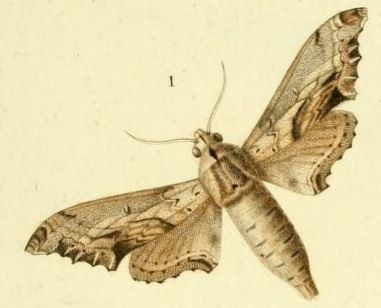

Scientific classification
- Domain: Eukaryota
- Kingdom: Animalia
- Phylum: Arthropoda
- Class: Insecta
- Order: Lepidoptera
- Family: Sphingidae
- Genus: Oplerclanis
- Species: O. rhadamistus

Binomial name
- Oplerclanis rhadamistus (Fabricius, 1781)

Synonyms
- Sphinx rhadamistus Fabricius, 1781; Pseudoclanis rhadamistus; Pseudoclanis rhadamistus hyrax Pierre, 1992; Pseudoclanis rhadamistus malaboensis Darge, 2006

= Oplerclanis rhadamistus =

Species of moth

Oplerclanis rhadamistus is a moth of the family Sphingidae. It is known from lowland forest and heavy woodland from Senegal to Angola, the Congo and western Uganda.

The length of the forewings is 27–30 mm for males.
