= Salagena nigropuncta =

Scientific classification
- Domain: Eukaryota
- Kingdom: Animalia
- Phylum: Arthropoda
- Class: Insecta
- Order: Lepidoptera
- Family: Cossidae
- Genus: Salagena
- Species: S. nigropuncta

Binomial name
- Salagena nigropuncta Le Cerf, 1919

Species of moth

Salagena nigropuncta is a moth in the family Cossidae. It is found in Niger and Senegal.
