= Salagena inversa =

Scientific classification
- Domain: Eukaryota
- Kingdom: Animalia
- Phylum: Arthropoda
- Class: Insecta
- Order: Lepidoptera
- Family: Cossidae
- Genus: Salagena
- Species: S. inversa

Binomial name
- Salagena inversa Gaede, 1929

Species of moth

Salagena inversa is a moth in the family Cossidae. It is found in Senegal.
