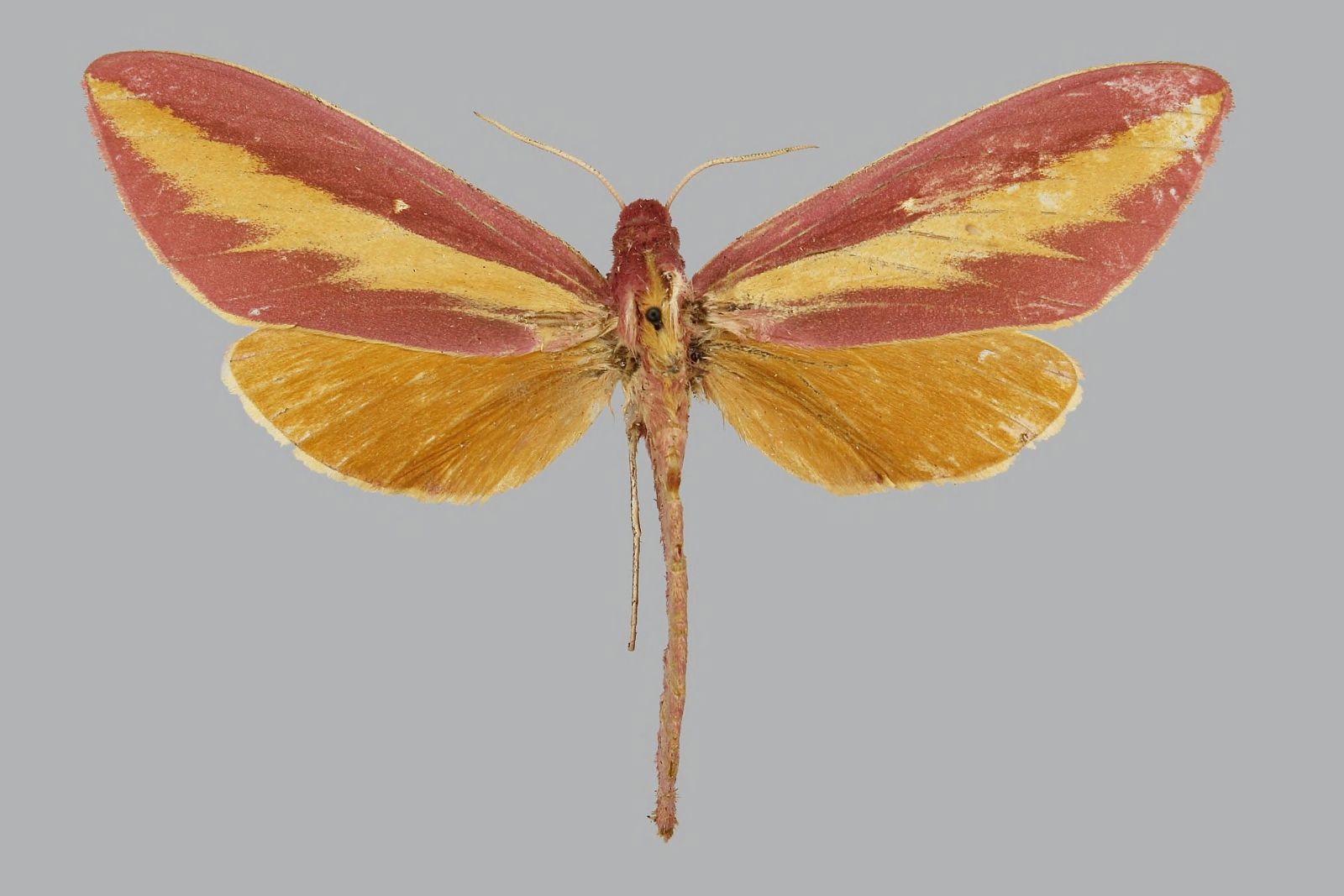

Scientific classification
- Kingdom: Animalia
- Phylum: Arthropoda
- Class: Insecta
- Order: Lepidoptera
- Family: Sphingidae
- Genus: Leucophlebia
- Species: L. neumanni

Binomial name
- Leucophlebia neumanni Rothschild, 1902

= Leucophlebia neumanni =

Species of moth

Leucophlebia neumanni is a moth of the family Sphingidae. It is known from dry bush in southern and western Ethiopia and in northern Uganda.
