= Cosmopterix luteoapicalis =

Scientific classification
- Kingdom: Animalia
- Phylum: Arthropoda
- Clade: Pancrustacea
- Class: Insecta
- Order: Lepidoptera
- Family: Cosmopterigidae
- Genus: Cosmopterix
- Species: C. luteoapicalis

Binomial name
- Cosmopterix luteoapicalis Sinev, 2002

Species of moth

Cosmopterix luteoapicalis is a moth in the family Cosmopterigidae. It was described by Sinev in 2002. It is found in the Democratic Republic of the Congo and Senegal.

The larvae feed on Cyperus rotundus.
