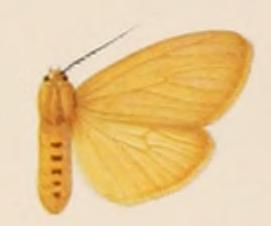

Scientific classification
- Kingdom: Animalia
- Phylum: Arthropoda
- Class: Insecta
- Order: Lepidoptera
- Superfamily: Noctuoidea
- Family: Erebidae
- Subfamily: Arctiinae
- Genus: Estigmene
- Species: E. laglaizei

Binomial name
- Estigmene laglaizei Rothschild, 1910

= Estigmene laglaizei =

Species of moth

Estigmene laglaizei is a species of moth of the family Erebidae. It is found in Senegal.
