= Acantharctia nivea =

Scientific classification
- Kingdom: Animalia
- Phylum: Arthropoda
- Class: Insecta
- Order: Lepidoptera
- Superfamily: Noctuoidea
- Family: Erebidae
- Subfamily: Arctiinae
- Genus: Acantharctia
- Species: A. nivea

Binomial name
- Acantharctia nivea Aurivillius, 1900

Species of moth

Acantharctia nivea is a species of moth of the family Erebidae. It was described by Per Olof Christopher Aurivillius in 1900. It is found in Angola, Cameroon, the Democratic Republic of the Congo, Nigeria and Senegal.
