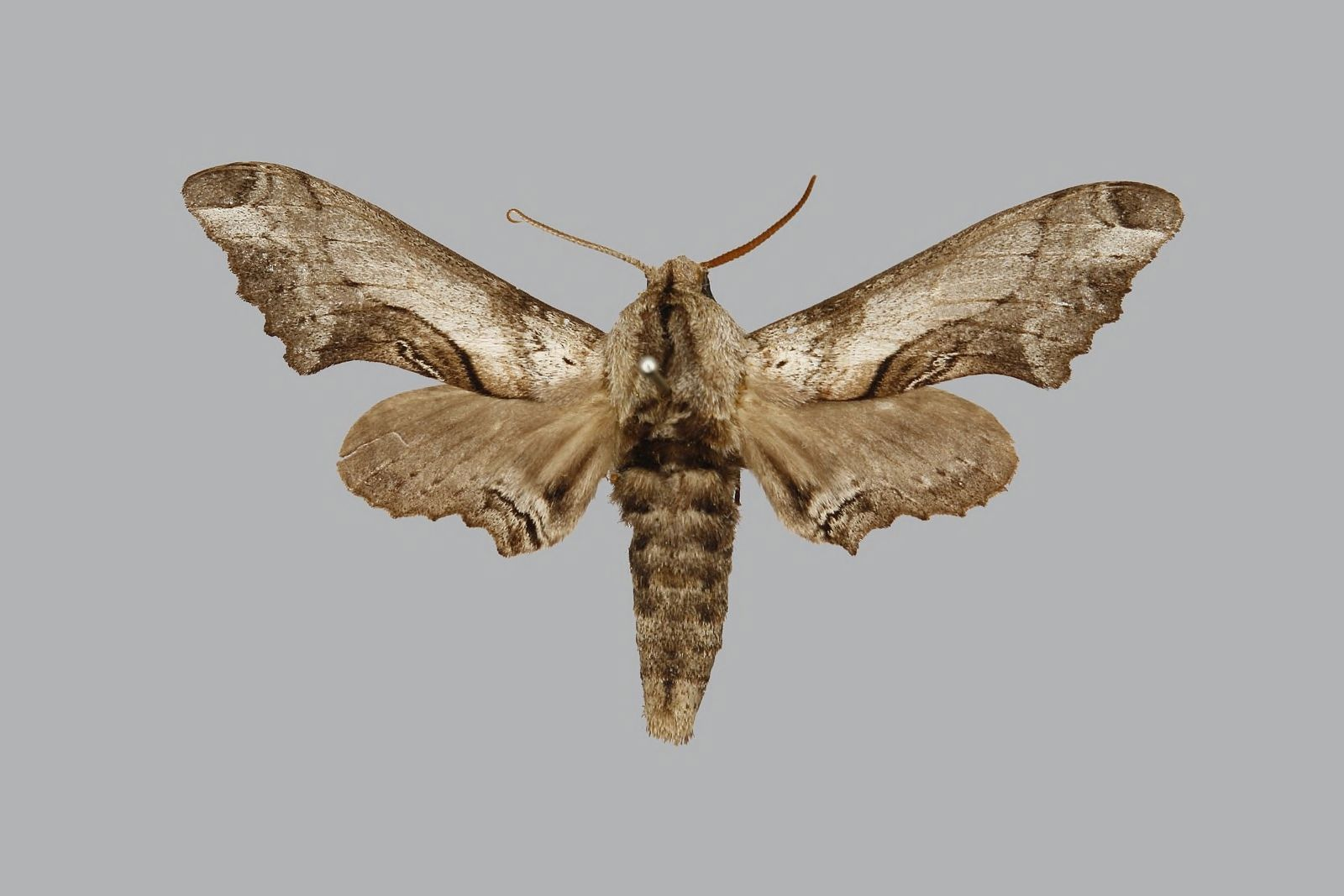

Scientific classification
- Kingdom: Animalia
- Phylum: Arthropoda
- Class: Insecta
- Order: Lepidoptera
- Family: Sphingidae
- Genus: Oplerclanis
- Species: O. boisduvali

Binomial name
- Oplerclanis boisduvali (Aurivillius, 1898)

Synonyms
- Temnora boisduvali Aurivillius, 1898; Polyptychus boisduvali; Pseudoclanis boisduvali; Poliodes senegalensis Clark, 1920

= Oplerclanis boisduvali =

Species of moth

Oplerclanis boisduvali is a moth of the family Sphingidae. It is known from dry bush from Senegal to northern Nigeria.
