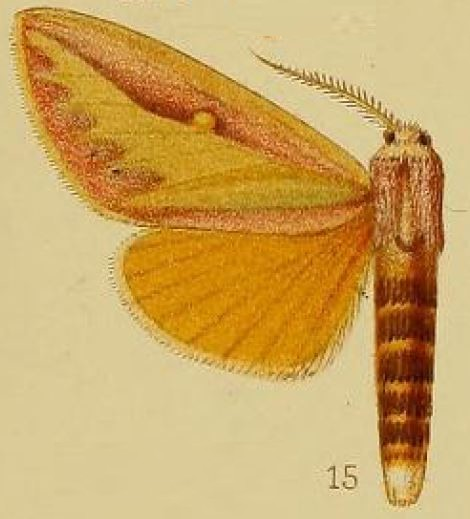

Scientific classification
- Domain: Eukaryota
- Kingdom: Animalia
- Phylum: Arthropoda
- Class: Insecta
- Order: Lepidoptera
- Family: Sphingidae
- Genus: Leucophlebia
- Species: L. afra

Binomial name
- Leucophlebia afra Karsch, 1891

= Leucophlebia afra =

Species of moth

Leucophlebia afra is a moth of the family Sphingidae. It is found from Senegal to northern Uganda and Sudan in the east, and to Angola in the west.

The length of the forewings is 20–25 mm for males and up to 30 mm for females.
