= List of moths of the Democratic Republic of the Congo =

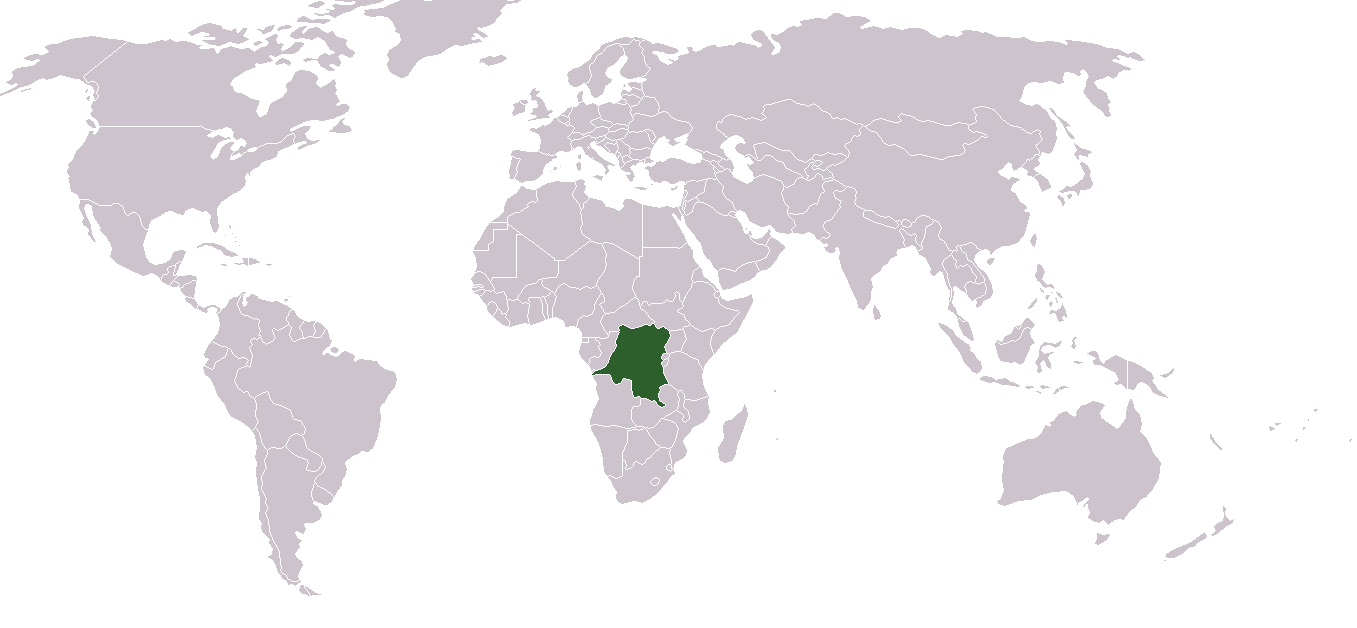
Location of the Democratic Republic of the Congo

There are about 2,400 known moth species of the Democratic Republic of the Congo. The moths (mostly nocturnal) and butterflies (mostly diurnal) together make up the taxonomic order Lepidoptera.

This is a list of moth species which have been recorded in the Democratic Republic of the Congo.

== Adelidae ==
- Ceromitia systelitis Meyrick, 1921

== Alucitidae ==
- Alucita fletcheriana (Ghesquière, 1940)

== Anomoeotidae ==
- Anomoeotes diaphana Hering, 1932
- Anomoeotes nigrivenosus Butler, 1893
- Anomoeotes simulatrix Talbot, 1929
- Staphylinochrous angustifascia Hering, 1937
- Staphylinochrous approximata Hering, 1937
- Staphylinochrous elongata Hering, 1937
- Staphylinochrous flavida Hampson, 1920
- Staphylinochrous fulva Hampson, 1910
- Thermochrous stenocraspis Hampson, 1910
- Thermochrous succisa Hering, 1937

== Arctiidae ==
- Acantharctia metaleuca Hampson, 1901
- Acantharctia mundata (Walker, 1865)
- Acantharctia nivea Aurivillius, 1900
- Acantharctia tenuifasciata Hampson, 1910
- Afraloa bifurca (Walker, 1855)
- Afrasura indecisa (Walker, 1869)
- Afrasura numida (Holland, 1893)
- Afrasura obliterata (Walker, 1864)
- Afrasura peripherica (Strand, 1912)
- Afrasura rivulosa (Walker, 1854)
- Afrasura violacea (Cieslak & Häuser, 2006)
- Afroarctia bergeri Toulgoët, 1978
- Afroarctia kenyana (Rothschild, 1933)
- Afroarctia sjostedti (Aurivillius, 1900)
- Afrowatsonius burgeoni (Talbot, 1928)
- Afrowatsonius marginalis (Walker, 1855)
- Aglossosia deceptans Hampson, 1914
- Alpenus diversata (Hampson, 1916)
- Alpenus dollmani (Hampson, 1920)
- Alpenus intacta (Hampson, 1916)
- Alpenus investigatorum (Karsch, 1898)
- Alpenus maculosa (Stoll, 1781)
- Alpenus nigropunctata (Bethune-Baker, 1908)
- Amata albobasis Kiriakoff, 1954
- Amata alenicola (Strand, 1912)
- Amata alicia (Butler, 1876)
- Amata bondo (Kiriakoff, 1965)
- Amata endocrocis (Hampson, 1903)
- Amata hellei (Romieux, 1935)
- Amata hemiphoenica (Hampson, 1910)
- Amata hypomela Kiriakoff, 1954
- Amata interniplaga (Mabille, 1890)
- Amata jacksoni Rothschild, 1910
- Amata kenredi (Rothschild, 1910)
- Amata leucerythra (Holland, 1893)
- Amata marinoides Kiriakoff, 1954
- Amata miozona (Hampson, 1910)
- Amata obraztsovi Kiriakoff, 1954
- Amata phaeobasis (Hampson, 1907)
- Amata schoutedeni Kiriakoff, 1954
- Amata stanleyi (Kiriakoff, 1965)
- Amata tomasina (Butler, 1876)
- Amata uelleburgensis (Strand, 1912)
- Amata waldowi (Grünberg, 1907)
- Amerila affinis (Rothschild, 1910)
- Amerila atrivena (Hampson, 1907)
- Amerila brunnea (Hampson, 1901)
- Amerila bubo (Walker, 1855)
- Amerila carneola (Hampson, 1916)
- Amerila fennia (Druce, 1887)
- Amerila leucoptera (Hampson, 1901)
- Amerila lineolata (Kiriakoff, 1954)
- Amerila luteibarba (Hampson, 1901)
- Amerila mulleri Häuser & Boppré, 1997
- Amerila nigrivenosa (Grünberg, 1910)
- Amerila niveivitrea (Bartel, 1903)
- Amerila puella (Fabricius, 1793)
- Amerila rufifemur (Walker, 1855)
- Amerila thermochroa (Hampson, 1916)
- Amerila vidua (Cramer, 1780)
- Amphicallia pactolicus (Butler, 1888)
- Amphicallia thelwalli (Druce, 1882)
- Amsacta aureolimbata Rothschild, 1910
- Amsacta grammiphlebia Hampson, 1901
- Anaphosia astrigata Hampson, 1910
- Anaphosia caloxantha Hering, 1932
- Anaphosia cyanogramma Hampson, 1903
- Anaphosia eurygrapha Hampson, 1910
- Anaphosia extranea Debauche, 1938
- Anaphosia parallela Bethune-Baker, 1911
- Anaphosia pectinata Hampson, 1910
- Anapisa dufranei Kiriakoff, 1952
- Anapisa histrio (Kiriakoff, 1953)
- Anapisa melaleuca (Holland, 1898)
- Anapisa metarctioides (Hampson, 1907)
- Anapisa monotica (Holland, 1893)
- Anapisa schoutedeni Kiriakoff, 1952
- Anapisa vanoyei (Kiriakoff, 1952)
- Apisa canescens Walker, 1855
- Apisa fontainei Kiriakoff, 1959
- Apisa grisescens (Dufrane, 1945)
- Apisa subargentea Joicey & Talbot, 1921
- Argina amanda (Boisduval, 1847)
- Argina leonina (Walker, 1865)
- Asura congoensis Kühne, 2007
- Asura eala Kühne, 2007
- Asura hermanni Kühne, 2007
- Asura mutabilis Kühne, 2007
- Asura russula Kiriakoff, 1963
- Asura sagenaria (Wallengren, 1860)
- Asura spinata Kühne, 2007
- Asura subfulvia Kiriakoff, 1954
- Asura versicolor Kühne, 2007
- Balacra affinis Rothschild, 1910
- Balacra aurivilliusi Kiriakoff, 1957
- Balacra batesi Druce, 1910
- Balacra belga Kiriakoff, 1954
- Balacra caeruleifascia Walker, 1856
- Balacra compsa (Jordan, 1904)
- Balacra daphaena (Hampson, 1898)
- Balacra elegans Aurivillius, 1892
- Balacra flavimacula Walker, 1856
- Balacra fontanei Kiriakoff, 1953
- Balacra haemalea Holland, 1893
- Balacra herona (Druce, 1887)
- Balacra humphreyi Rothschild, 1912
- Balacra jaensis Bethune-Baker, 1927
- Balacra nigripennis (Aurivillius, 1904)
- Balacra preussi (Aurivillius, 1904)
- Balacra pulchra Aurivillius, 1892
- Balacra rattrayi (Rothschild, 1910)
- Balacra rubricincta Holland, 1893
- Balacra rubrostriata (Aurivillius, 1892)
- Balacra similis Hulstaert, 1923
- Balacra tamsi (Kiriakoff, 1957)
- Bergeria bourgognei Kiriakoff, 1952
- Bergeria haematochrysa Kiriakoff, 1952
- Bergeria octava Kiriakoff, 1961
- Binna penicillata Walker, 1865
- Binna scita (Walker, 1865)
- Carcinarctia kivuensis Joicey & Talbot, 1924
- Carcinarctia laeliodes Hampson, 1916
- Carcinarctia rufa Joicey & Talbot, 1921
- Carcinopodia schoutedeni Strand, 1918
- Caripodia aurantiacella Kiriakoff, 1954
- Caripodia chrysargyria Hampson, 1900
- Caripodia consimilis Hampson, 1918
- Caripodia semisericea Kiriakoff, 1954
- Caryatis phileta (Drury, 1782)
- Caryatis stenoperas Hampson, 1910
- Ceryx albimacula (Walker, 1854)
- Ceryx antiopa Kiriakoff, 1953
- Ceryx ciprianii Berio, 1937
- Ceryx salutator Kiriakoff, 1965
- Cragia distigmata (Hampson, 1901)
- Creatonotos leucanioides Holland, 1893
- Creatonotos punctivitta (Walker, 1854)
- Cyana delicata (Walker, 1854)
- Cyana ellipsis Karisch & Dall'Asta, 2010
- Cyana hecqi Karisch & Dall'Asta, 2010
- Cyana klohsi Karisch, 2003
- Cyana luchoana Karisch, 2003
- Cyana pallidilinea Karisch, 2003
- Cyana paramargarethae Karisch & Dall'Asta, 2010
- Cyana pretoriae (Distant, 1897)
- Cyana quentini Karisch, 2003
- Cyana rubristriga (Holland, 1893)
- Cyana rufeola Karisch & Dall'Asta, 2010
- Cyana ueleana Karisch, 2003
- Cyana ugandana (Strand, 1912)
- Disparctia vittata (Druce, 1898)
- Dubatolovia neurophaea (Hampson, 1911)
- Eilema amaura Hering, 1926
- Eilema bifasciata Hampson, 1900
- Eilema bilati (Dufrane, 1945)
- Eilema danieli Kiriakoff, 1954
- Eilema gracilipennis (Wallengren, 1860)
- Eilema leia (Hampson, 1901)
- Eilema mesosticta Hampson, 1911
- Eilema peperita (Hampson, 1901)
- Eilema rufofasciata (Rothschild, 1912)
- Eilema sanguicosta (Hampson, 1901)
- Eilema tricolorana Kiriakoff, 1954
- Eilema triplaiola (Bethune-Baker, 1911)
- Eilema vicara Strand, 1922
- Epilacydes simulans Butler, 1875
- Epitoxis ceryxoides Berio, 1940
- Epitoxis stempfferi Kiriakoff, 1953
- Eressa pleurosticta Hampson, 1910
- Estigmene ansorgei Rothschild, 1910
- Estigmene neuriastis Hampson, 1907
- Estigmene ochreomarginata Bethune-Baker, 1909
- Estigmene sabulosa Romieux, 1943
- Estigmene tenuistrigata (Hampson, 1900)
- Estigmene trivitta (Walker, 1855)
- Euchromia guineensis (Fabricius, 1775)
- Euchromia lethe (Fabricius, 1775)
- Euchromia schoutedeni Debauche, 1936
- Eyralpenus metaxantha (Hampson, 1920)
- Eyralpenus postflavida (Rothschild, 1933)
- Eyralpenus scioana (Oberthür, 1880)
- Galtara doriae (Oberthür, 1880)
- Galtara elongata (Swinhoe, 1907)
- Galtara notabilis Toulgoët, 1980
- Galtara reticulata (Hampson, 1909)
- Hippurarctia ferrigera (Druce, 1910)
- Hippurarctia taymansi (Rothschild, 1910)
- Ilemodes isogyna Romieux, 1935
- Ischnarctia brunnescens Bartel, 1903
- Ischnarctia cinerea (Pagenstecher, 1903)
- Kiriakoffalia lemairei (Toulgoët, 1976)
- Lempkeella avellana (Kiriakoff, 1957)
- Leptoceryx caudatula (Kiriakoff, 1953)
- Leptoceryx pusilla Kiriakoff, 1953
- Logunovium nigricosta (Holland, 1893)
- Logunovium scortillum Wallengren, 1875
- Mecistorhabdia haematoessa (Holland, 1893)
- Meganaclia perpusilla (Walker, 1856)
- Melisa croceipes (Aurivillius, 1892)
- Melisa diptera (Walker, 1854)
- Menegites nivea Kiriakoff, 1954
- Metamicroptera rotundata Hulstaert, 1923
- Metarctia brunneipennis Hering, 1932
- Metarctia burungae Debauche, 1942
- Metarctia collocalia Kiriakoff, 1957
- Metarctia didyma Kiriakoff, 1957
- Metarctia fario (Kiriakoff, 1957)
- Metarctia flavicincta Aurivillius, 1900
- Metarctia flavivena Hampson, 1901
- Metarctia forsteri Kiriakoff, 1955
- Metarctia haematica Holland, 1893
- Metarctia heringi Kiriakoff, 1957
- Metarctia inconspicua Holland, 1892
- Metarctia infausta Kiriakoff, 1957
- Metarctia lateritia Herrich-Schäffer, 1855
- Metarctia longipalpis Hulstaert, 1923
- Metarctia morag Kiriakoff, 1957
- Metarctia morosa Kiriakoff, 1957
- Metarctia phaeoptera Hampson, 1909
- Metarctia rubribasa Bethune-Baker, 1911
- Metarctia rubripuncta Hampson, 1898
- Metarctia rufescens Walker, 1855
- Metarctia schoutedeni Kiriakoff, 1953
- Metarctia seydeliana (Kiriakoff, 1953)
- Metarctia subincarnata (Kiriakoff, 1954)
- Metarctia upembae Kiriakoff, 1949
- Metarctia venustissima Kiriakoff, 1961
- Metarctia virgata Joicey & Talbot, 1921
- Micralarctia punctulatum (Wallengren, 1860)
- Myopsyche bokumae Kiriakoff, 1954
- Myopsyche pallidicincta Kiriakoff, 1954
- Myopsyche sankuruica Kiriakoff, 1954
- Nacliodes microsippia Strand, 1912
- Nanna collinsii Kühne, 2007
- Neophemula vitrina (Oberthür, 1909)
- Neuroxena ansorgei Kirby, 1896
- Neuroxena postrubidus (Rothschild, 1933)
- Nyctemera apicalis (Walker, 1854)
- Nyctemera chalcosidia (Hampson, 1910)
- Nyctemera chromis Druce, 1882
- Nyctemera druna (Swinhoe, 1904)
- Nyctemera hemixantha (Aurivillius, 1904)
- Nyctemera itokina (Aurivillius, 1904)
- Nyctemera leuconoe Hopffer, 1857
- Nyctemera perspicua (Walker, 1854)
- Nyctemera rattrayi (Swinhoe, 1904)
- Nyctemera restrictum (Butler, 1894)
- Nyctemera xanthura (Plötz, 1880)
- Oreoceryx aenea Kiriakoff, 1953
- Ovenna simulans (Mabille, 1878)
- Ovenna subgriseola (Strand, 1912)
- Ovenna vicaria (Walker, 1854)
- Palaeosiccia punctata Hampson, 1900
- Paralacydes arborifera (Butler, 1875)
- Paralacydes bivittata (Bartel, 1903)
- Paralacydes decemmaculata (Rothschild, 1916)
- Paralpenus wintgensi (Strand, 1909)
- Paramelisa lophura Aurivillius, 1905
- Paramyopsyche wittei Debauche, 1942
- Pericaliella melanodisca (Hampson, 1907)
- Phryganopsis alberici Dufrane, 1945
- Phryganopsis angulifascia (Strand, 1912)
- Phryganopsis flavicosta Hampson, 1901
- Phryganopsis tryphosa Kiriakoff, 1958
- Popoudina aliena (Kiriakoff, 1954)
- Pseudlepista flavicosta Hampson, 1910
- Pseudmelisa chalybsa Hampson, 1910
- Pseudodiptera alberici (Dufrane, 1945)
- Pseudodiptera clypeatus (Kiriakoff, 1965)
- Pseudodiptera dufranei (Kiriakoff, 1965)
- Pseudodiptera musiforme Kaye, 1918
- Pseudothyretes kamitugensis (Dufrane, 1945)
- Pseudothyretes nigrita (Kiriakoff, 1961)
- Pseudothyretes perpusilla (Walker, 1856)
- Pseudothyretes rubicundula (Strand, 1912)
- Pusiola ampla (Debauche, 1942)
- Pusiola celida (Bethune-Baker, 1911)
- Pusiola derelicta (Debauche, 1942)
- Pusiola fageli (Kiriakoff, 1954)
- Pusiola isabellina (Kiriakoff, 1954)
- Pusiola leiodes (Kiriakoff, 1954)
- Pusiola ochreata (Hampson, 1901)
- Pusiola roscidella (Kiriakoff, 1954)
- Pusiola sordidula (Kiriakoff, 1954)
- Pusiola sorghicolor (Kiriakoff, 1954)
- Pusiola straminea (Hampson, 1901)
- Pusiola unicolor (Kiriakoff, 1954)
- Radiarctia lutescens (Walker, 1854)
- Radiarctia melanochoria Hering, 1932
- Radiarctia rhodesiana (Hampson, 1900)
- Rhabdomarctia rubrilineata (Bethune-Baker, 1911)
- Rhipidarctia aurora Kiriakoff, 1957
- Rhipidarctia conradti (Oberthür, 1911)
- Rhipidarctia crameri Kiriakoff, 1961
- Rhipidarctia forsteri (Kiriakoff, 1953)
- Rhipidarctia invaria (Walker, 1856)
- Rhipidarctia rhodosoma Kiriakoff, 1957
- Rhipidarctia rubrovitta (Aurivillius, 1904)
- Rhipidarctia saturata Kiriakoff, 1957
- Secusio deilemera Talbot, 1929
- Secusio discoidalis Talbot, 1929
- Siccia bicolorata Romieux, 1937
- Siccia gypsia Hampson, 1914
- Siccia melanospila Hampson, 1911
- Siccia overlaeti Kühne, 2007
- Spilosoma albiventre Kiriakoff, 1963
- Spilosoma aurantiaca (Holland, 1893)
- Spilosoma batesi (Rothschild, 1910)
- Spilosoma curvilinea Walker, 1855
- Spilosoma dufranei Kiriakoff, 1965
- Spilosoma immaculata Bartel, 1903
- Spilosoma maniemae Kiriakoff, 1965
- Spilosoma metaleuca (Hampson, 1905)
- Spilosoma nyasana Rothschild, 1933
- Spilosoma occidens (Rothschild, 1910)
- Spilosoma penultimum Kiriakoff, 1965
- Spilosoma quadrilunata (Hampson, 1901)
- Spilosoma rava (Druce, 1898)
- Spilosoma semihyalina Bartel, 1903
- Spilosoma sulphurea Bartel, 1903
- Spilosoma tenuivena Kiriakoff, 1965
- Spilosoma togoensis Bartel, 1903
- Spilosoma unipuncta (Hampson, 1905)
- Stenarctia quadripunctata Aurivillius, 1900
- Stenilema quadrinotata Kiriakoff, 1965
- Teracotona euprepia Hampson, 1900
- Teracotona melanocera (Hampson, 1920)
- Teracotona multistrigata Joicey & Talbot, 1924
- Teracotona pardalina Bartel, 1903
- Teracotona translucens (Grünberg, 1907)
- Teracotona wittei (Debauche, 1942)
- Thyretes monteiroi Butler, 1876
- Thyretes negus Oberthür, 1878
- Thyretes signivenis Hering, 1937
- Thyrogonia aurantiiventris Kiriakoff, 1953
- Thyrogonia hampsoni Kiriakoff, 1953
- Trichaeta bivittata (Walker, 1864)
- Trichaeta fulvescens (Walker, 1854)
- Utetheisa pulchella (Linnaeus, 1758)
- Zadadrina metallica Kiriakoff, 1954

== Autostichidae ==
- Afrosymmoca seydeli Gozmány, 1966
- Afrosymmoca straminea Gozmány, 1966
- Dyscordaxis pygmeus Gozmány, 1975

== Bombycidae ==
- Racinoa metallescens (Möschler)

== Brahmaeidae ==
- Dactyloceras barnsi (Joicey & Talbot, 1924)
- Dactyloceras ducarmei Bouyer, 2002
- Dactyloceras tridentata (Conte, 1911)

== Carposinidae ==
- Carposina altivaga Meyrick, 1925

== Coleophoridae ==
- Coleophora bantuella Baldizzone & van der Wolf, 2005
- Coleophora crossanthes Meyrick, 1938
- Coleophora discopunctata Baldizzone & van der Wolf, 2005
- Coleophora fragilella Baldizzone & van der Wolf, 2005
- Coleophora frivolella Baldizzone & van der Wolf, 2005
- Coleophora katangica Baldizzone & van der Wolf, 2005
- Coleophora romieuxi Baldizzone & van der Wolf, 2005
- Coleophora terebrans Baldizzone & van der Wolf, 2005
- Coleophora tetrodonta Baldizzone & van der Wolf, 2005
- Neoblastobasis perisella Adamski, 2010

== Cosmopterigidae ==
- Cosmopterix luteoapicalis Sinev, 2002
- Gisilia sclerodes (Meyrick, 1909)
- Macrobathra crococephala Meyrick, 1936

== Cossidae ==
- Macrocossus toluminus (Druce, 1887)
- Oreocossus kilimanjarensis (Holland, 1892)

== Crambidae ==
- Aethaloessa floridalis (Zeller, 1852)
- Ancylolomia capensis Zeller, 1852
- Ancylolomia gracilis Fawcett, 1917
- Angustalius besucheti (Błeszyński, 1963)
- Antigastra catalaunalis (Duponchel, 1833)
- Argyractis tripunctalis (Snellen, 1872)
- Botyodes asialis Guenée, 1854
- Cadarena sinuata (Fabricius, 1781)
- Caffrocrambus democritus Bassi, 1994
- Caffrocrambus heraclitus Bassi, 1994
- Caffrocrambus parmenides Bassi, 1994
- Calamotropha abjectella Snellen, 1872
- Calamotropha robustella Snellen, 1872
- Cangetta hartoghialis (Snellen, 1872)
- Circobotys sinisalis (Walker, 1859)
- Cnaphalocrocis poeyalis (Boisduval, 1833)
- Conotalis nigroradians (Mabille, 1900)
- Cotachena smaragdina (Butler, 1875)
- Crocidolomia pavonana (Fabricius, 1794)
- Cryptosara auralis (Snellen, 1872)
- Culladia achroellum (Mabille, 1900)
- Culladia inconspicuellus (Snellen, 1872)
- Desmia incomposita (Bethune-Baker, 1909)
- Diaphana indica (Saunders, 1851)
- Epipagis ocellata (Hampson, 1916)
- Eporidia dariusalis Walker, 1859
- Euchromius ocellea (Haworth, 1811)
- Euclasta varii Popescu-Gorj & Constantinescu, 1973
- Ghesquierellana hirtusalis (Walker, 1859)
- Glyphodes basifascialis Hampson, 1898
- Haritalodes derogata (Fabricius, 1775)
- Herpetogramma licarsisalis (Walker, 1859)
- Herpetogramma phaeopteralis (Guenée, 1854)
- Hydriris ornatalis (Duponchel, 1832)
- Leucinodes orbonalis Guenée, 1854
- Maruca vitrata (Fabricius, 1787)
- Metoeca foedalis (Guenée, 1854)
- Niveocatharylla romieuxi Bassi, 1999
- Nomophila brevispinalis Munroe, 1973
- Nomophila noctuella ([Denis & Schiffermüller], 1775)
- Omiodes indicata (Fabricius, 1775)
- Omiodes poeonalis (Walker, 1859)
- Orphanostigma abruptalis (Walker, 1859)
- Palpita bonjongalis (Plötz, 1880)
- Palpita metallata (Fabricius, 1781)
- Parapoynx fluctuosalis (Zeller, 1852)
- Parotis arachnealis (Walker, 1859)
- Parotis squamitibialis (Strand, 1912)
- Parotis triangulalis (Strand, 1912)
- Phostria flavipectus (Bethune-Baker, 1909)
- Phostria hesusalis (Walker, 1859)
- Phostria stygichroa (Bethune-Baker, 1909)
- Phryganodes biguttata Hampson, 1898
- Pilocrocis nubilinea Bethune-Baker, 1909
- Pimelephila ghesquierei Tams, 1930
- Pleuroptya aegrotalis (Zeller, 1852)
- Pleuroptya balteata (Fabricius, 1798)
- Psara bipunctalis (Fabricius, 1794)
- Pseudocatharylla allecto Bassi, 1999
- Pseudocatharylla shafferi (Bassi, 1999)
- Pseudocatharylla submikengella Błeszyński, 1964
- Pycnarmon diaphana (Cramer, 1779)
- Pyrausta flavimarginalis (Hampson, 1913)
- Pyrausta interfixalis (Walker, 1869)
- Pyrausta phaenicealis (Hübner, 1818)
- Sebrus argus Bassi, 1995
- Spoladea recurvalis (Fabricius, 1775)
- Stemorrhages sericea (Drury, 1773)
- Syllepte erebarcha (Meyrick, 1939)
- Syllepte fulviceps (Bethune-Baker, 1909)
- Syllepte neurogramma (Meyrick, 1939)
- Syllepte purpurascens Hampson, 1899
- Syllepte torsipex (Hampson, 1898)
- Ulopeza conigeralis Zeller, 1852
- Viettessa bethalis (Viette, 1958)
- Zebronia phenice (Cramer, 1780)

== Drepanidae ==
- Callidrepana macnultyi Watson, 1965
- Callidrepana serena Watson, 1965
- Epicampoptera andersoni (Tams, 1925)
- Epicampoptera marantica (Tams, 1930)
- Epicampoptera robusta Watson, 1965
- Epicampoptera seydeli Watson, 1965
- Epicampoptera strandi Bryk, 1913
- Epicampoptera tamsi Watson, 1965
- Gonoreta angulosa Watson, 1965
- Gonoreta forcipulata Watson, 1965
- Gonoreta opacifinis Watson, 1965
- Gonoreta subtilis (Bryk, 1913)
- Isospidia brunneola (Holland, 1893)
- Negera natalensis (Felder, 1874)
- Negera ramosa Watson, 1965
- Spidia fenestrata Butler, 1878
- Spidia smithi (Warren, 1902)
- Spidia subviridis (Warren, 1899)
- Uranometra oculata (Holland, 1893)

== Elachistidae ==
- Eretmograptis coniodoxa Meyrick, 1938
- Orophia haemorrhanta (Meyrick, 1924)
- Urodeta acerba Sruoga & J. de Prins, 2011
- Urodeta bucera Sruoga & J. de Prins, 2011
- Urodeta talea Sruoga & J. de Prins, 2011

== Eupterotidae ==
- Camerunia flava Aurivillius, 1904
- Catajana bimaculata (Dewitz, 1879)
- Epijana cinerea Holland, 1893
- Epijana cosima (Plötz, 1880)
- Epijana latifasciata Dall'Asta & Poncin, 1980
- Epijana meridionalis Dall'Asta & Poncin, 1980
- Hibrildes crawshayi Butler, 1896
- Hibrildes norax Druce, 1887
- Hoplojana insignifica Rothschild, 1917
- Jana eurymas Herrich-Schäffer, 1854
- Jana fletcheri Berger, 1980
- Jana gracilis Walker, 1855
- Jana obscura Aurivillius, 1893
- Jana preciosa Aurivillius, 1893
- Jana pseudostrigina Rothschild, 1917
- Janomima dannfelti (Aurivillius, 1893)
- Janomima ibandana Dall'Asta, 1979
- Janomima mariana (White, 1843)
- Lichenopteryx scotina Hering, 1932
- Phiala alba Aurivillius, 1893
- Phiala costipuncta (Herrich-Schäffer, 1855)
- Phiala cubicularis Strand, 1911
- Phiala maxima Kühne, 2007
- Phiala nigrolineata Aurivillius, 1903
- Phiala postmedialis Strand, 1911
- Phiala pseudatomaria Strand, 1911
- Phiala simplex Aurivillius, 1904
- Phiala specialis Kühne, 2007
- Phiala ueleae Kühne, 2007
- Stenoglene bipartita (Rothschild, 1917)
- Stenoglene bipunctatus (Aurivillius, 1909)
- Stenoglene brunneofasciata Dall'Asta & Poncin, 1980
- Stenoglene citrinoides Dall'Asta & Poncin, 1980
- Stenoglene citrinus (Druce, 1886)
- Stenoglene decellei Dall'Asta & Poncin, 1980
- Stenoglene dehanicus (Strand, 1911)
- Stenoglene fontainei Dall'Asta & Poncin, 1980
- Stenoglene fouassini Dall'Asta & Poncin, 1980
- Stenoglene latimaculata Dall'Asta & Poncin, 1980
- Stenoglene nivalis (Rothschild, 1917)
- Stenoglene obtusus (Walker, 1864)
- Stenoglene opalina Druce, 1910
- Stenoglene parvula Dall'Asta & Poncin, 1980
- Stenoglene paulisi Dall'Asta & Poncin, 1980
- Stenoglene pellucida Joicey & Talbot, 1924
- Stenoglene plagiatus (Aurivillius, 1911)
- Stenoglene preussi (Aurivillius, 1893)
- Stenoglene roseus (Druce, 1886)
- Stenoglene shabae Dall'Asta & Poncin, 1980
- Stenoglene thelda (Druce, 1887)
- Stenoglene uelei Dall'Asta & Poncin, 1980
- Stenoglene uniformis Dall'Asta & Poncin, 1980

== Gelechiidae ==
- Cymotricha leontovitchi Ghesquière, 1940
- Dactylethrella bryophilella (Walsingham, 1891)
- Dichomeris pammiges Ghesquière, 1940
- Paltoloma paleata Ghesquière, 1940
- Pectinophora gossypiella (Saunders, 1844)
- Phthorimaea operculella (Zeller, 1873)
- Prasodryas opalina Ghesquière, 1940
- Ptilothyris aglaocrossa Meyrick, 1935
- Ptilothyris brachysema Meyrick, 1938
- Ptilothyris crocophracta Meyrick, 1938
- Ptilothyris loxocasis Meyrick, 1938
- Ptilothyris nausicaa Meyrick, 1926
- Ptilothyris nemophorella Ghesquière, 1940
- Ptilothyris porphyrea Ghesquière, 1940
- Ptilothyris purpurea Walsingham, 1897
- Ptilothyris serangota Meyrick, 1932
- Scrobipalpa aptatella (Walker, 1864)
- Scrobipalpa ergasima (Meyrick, 1916)
- Sitotroga cerealella (Olivier, 1789)
- Trichembola oreia Ghesquière, 1940
- Trichembola palynata Ghesquière, 1940
- Trichotaphe phaeothina Ghesquière, 1940

== Geometridae ==
- Acollesis oxychora Prout, 1930
- Aletis helcita (Linnaeus, 1763)
- Anoectomychus eutoeodes (Prout, 1934)
- Antharmostes interalbicans Warren, 1902
- Antharmostes marginata (Warren, 1897)
- Antharmostes orinophragma Prout, 1930
- Antharmostes simplicimargo Prout, 1917
- Antitrygodes callibotrys Prout, 1918
- Aphilopota melanommata Prout, 1954
- Aphilopota nubilata Prout, 1954
- Aphilopota phanerostigma Prout, 1917
- Aphilopota scapularia (Snellen, 1872)
- Aphilopota symphronima Prout, 1954
- Archichlora devoluta (Walker, 1861)
- Archichlora phyllobrota (Holland, 1920)
- Ascotis reciprocaria (Walker, 1860)
- Asthenotricha dentatissima Warren, 1899
- Asthenotricha malostigma Prout, 1921
- Asthenotricha polydora Debauche, 1938
- Asthenotricha psephotaenia Prout, 1935
- Asthenotricha pythia Debauche, 1938
- Asthenotricha semidivisa Warren, 1901
- Asthenotricha straba Prout, 1921
- Bathycolpodes excavata (Warren, 1898)
- Bathycolpodes implumis Prout, 1930
- Bathycolpodes semigrisea (Warren, 1897)
- Biston abruptaria (Walker, 1869)
- Biston basanga Karisch, 2005
- Biston dargei (Herbulot, 1973)
- Biston johannaria (Oberthür, 1913)
- Biston subocularia (Mabille, 1893)
- Blaboplutodes desmeti Karisch, 2004
- Cabera fulgurata Debauche, 1938
- Cabera monacaria Debauche, 1938
- Cacostegania obscurata (Warren, 1905)
- Cartaletis gracilis (Möschler, 1887)
- Cartaletis tenuimargo Prout, 1916
- Cartaletis variabilis (Butler, 1878)
- Cheroscelis oospila Prout, 1912
- Chiasmia angolaria (Snellen, 1872)
- Chiasmia austera (Prout, 1932)
- Chiasmia rectistriaria (Herrich-Schäffer, 1854)
- Chiasmia subcurvaria (Mabille, 1897)
- Chiasmia umbrata (Warren, 1897)
- Chrysocraspeda leighata Warren, 1904
- Cleora argillacea (Warren, 1900)
- Cleora derogaria (Snellen, 1872)
- Cleora rostella D. S. Fletcher, 1967
- Cleora thyris D. S. Fletcher, 1967
- Coenina aurivena Butler, 1898
- Colocleora ansorgei (Warren, 1901)
- Colocleora clarivenata (Prout, 1918)
- Colocleora smithi (Warren, 1904)
- Comibaena barnsi Prout, 1930
- Conolophia conscitaria (Walker, 1861)
- Conolophia rectistrigaria Rebel, 1914
- Cyclophora dewitzi (Prout, 1920)
- Cyclophora leonaria (Walker, 1861)
- Dasymacaria ansorgei Warren, 1901
- Dorsifulcrum cephalotes (Walker, 1869)
- Drepanogynis tenoris (Prout, 1934)
- Ecpetala caesiplaga (Prout, 1935)
- Ectropis amphitromera Prout, 1911
- Ectropis ocellata Warren, 1902
- Eois laxipecten Herbulot, 2000
- Epigynopteryx ansorgei (Warren, 1901)
- Epigynopteryx maculosata (Warren, 1901)
- Epigynopteryx termininota Prout, 1934
- Erastria albosignata (Walker, 1863)
- Erastria madecassaria (Boisduval, 1833)
- Ereunetea minor (Holland, 1893)
- Ereunetea semifumida Warren, 1909
- Eupithecia dilucida (Warren, 1899)
- Eupithecia semipallida Janse, 1933
- Geodena flaviventer (Warren, 1909)
- Geodena quadrigutta Walker, 1856
- Geolyces attesaria Walker, 1860
- Haplolabida sjostedti (Aurivillius, 1910)
- Hydrelia argyridia (Butler, 1894)
- Hylemeridia eurema (Plötz, 1880)
- Hypocoela turpisaria (Swinhoe, 1904)
- Idaea prucholoma (Prout, 1932)
- Idaea pulveraria (Snellen, 1872)
- Idiodes flexilinea (Warren, 1898)
- Idiodes pectinata (Herbulot, 1966)
- Isturgia exospilata (Walker, 1861)
- Lissoblemma hamularia (Snellen, 1872)
- Lissoblemma viridifusa Warren, 1902
- Malgassapeira mixtilinea (Warren, 1909)
- Melinoessa aemonia (Swinhoe, 1904)
- Melinoessa asteria Prout, 1934
- Metallochlora misera Prout, 1920
- Miantochora venerata (Mabille, 1879)
- Milocera diffusata (Warren, 1902)
- Mimoclystia euthygramma (Prout, 1921)
- Narthecusa tenuiorata Walker, 1862
- Nothylemera vinolibata Prout, 1932
- Ochroplutodes bisecta (Warren, 1904)
- Ochroplutodes hecqi Karisch, 2008
- Ochroplutodes irregularis Karisch, 2008
- Ochroplutodes variabilis Karisch, 2008
- Omphalucha brunnea (Warren, 1899)
- Oxyfidonia pallidisecta Prout, 1915
- Piercia ansorgei (Bethune-Baker, 1913)
- Pitthea agenoria Druce, 1890
- Pitthea argentiplaga Warren, 1897
- Pitthea caesarea Rebel, 1914
- Pitthea continua Walker, 1854
- Pitthea fractimacula Warren, 1897
- Pitthea fuliginosa Druce, 1910
- Prasinocyma rugistrigula Prout, 1912
- Problepsis similinotata Prout, 1917
- Protosteira spectabilis (Warren, 1899)
- Psilocerea pulverosa (Warren, 1894)
- Psilocerea semirufa (Warren, 1901)
- Psilocladia repudiosa (Prout, 1915)
- Ptomophyle subcarnea (Warren, 1902)
- Pycnostega areta Prout, 1934
- Racotis angulosa Herbulot, 1973
- Rhodophthitus tricoloraria (Mabille, 1890)
- Scopula acidalia (Holland, 1894)
- Scopula aphercta Prout, 1932
- Scopula coniargyris Prout, 1932
- Scopula internataria (Walker, 1861)
- Scopula latitans Prout, 1920
- Scopula luxipuncta Prout, 1932
- Scopula pyraliata (Warren, 1898)
- Scopula rectisecta Prout, 1920
- Scopula stephanitis Prout, 1932
- Scopula suda Prout, 1932
- Somatina fungifera Warren, 1909
- Somatina rhodochila Prout, 1932
- Somatina virginalis Prout, 1917
- Terina charmione (Fabricius, 1793)
- Terina flaviorsa Prout, 1934
- Terina octogesa (Druce, 1887)
- Terina overlaeti Prout, 1932
- Terina tanyeces Prout, 1921
- Thalassodes dentatilinea Prout, 1912
- Traminda neptunaria (Guenée, 1858)
- Trimetopia aetheraria Guenée, 1858
- Unnamed genus Ennominae ansorgeata (Warren, 1903)
- Unnamed genus Ennominae sordida (Warren, 1905)
- Vaena eacleoides Walker, 1869
- Victoria perornata Warren, 1898
- Xanthorhoe exorista Prout, 1922
- Xanthorhoe procne (Fawcett, 1916)
- Xanthorhoe transcissa (Warren, 1902)
- Xanthorhoe transjugata Prout, 1923
- Xanthorhoe trientata (Warren, 1901)
- Xenimpia erosa Warren, 1895
- Zamarada acosmeta Prout, 1921
- Zamarada acrochra Prout, 1928
- Zamarada adumbrata D. S. Fletcher, 1974
- Zamarada aequilumata D. S. Fletcher, 1974
- Zamarada amicta Prout, 1915
- Zamarada amymone Prout, 1934
- Zamarada antimima D. S. Fletcher, 1974
- Zamarada arguta D. S. Fletcher, 1974
- Zamarada astyphela D. S. Fletcher, 1974
- Zamarada auratisquama Warren, 1897
- Zamarada bastelbergeri Gaede, 1915
- Zamarada bathyscaphes Prout, 1912
- Zamarada bicuspida D. S. Fletcher, 1974
- Zamarada bonaberiensis Strand, 1915
- Zamarada candelabra D. S. Fletcher, 1974
- Zamarada carcassoni D. S. Fletcher, 1974
- Zamarada chrysopa D. S. Fletcher, 1974
- Zamarada cinereata D. S. Fletcher, 1974
- Zamarada clenchi D. S. Fletcher, 1974
- Zamarada collarti Debauche, 1938
- Zamarada consummata D. S. Fletcher, 1974
- Zamarada corroborata Herbulot, 1954
- Zamarada corymbophora D. S. Fletcher, 1974
- Zamarada crystallophana Mabille, 1900
- Zamarada cydippe Herbulot, 1954
- Zamarada dasysceles D. S. Fletcher, 1974
- Zamarada deformata D. S. Fletcher, 1974
- Zamarada delta D. S. Fletcher, 1974
- Zamarada dentata D. S. Fletcher, 1958
- Zamarada denticatella Prout, 1922
- Zamarada dentigera Warren, 1909
- Zamarada dialitha D. S. Fletcher, 1974
- Zamarada dilata D. S. Fletcher, 1974
- Zamarada dione D. S. Fletcher, 1974
- Zamarada dolorosa D. S. Fletcher, 1974
- Zamarada dorsiplaga Prout, 1922
- Zamarada dyscapna D. S. Fletcher, 1974
- Zamarada enippe Prout, 1921
- Zamarada episema D. S. Fletcher, 1974
- Zamarada euerces Prout, 1928
- Zamarada euphrosyne Oberthür, 1912
- Zamarada euterpina Oberthür, 1912
- Zamarada excavata Bethune-Baker, 1913
- Zamarada exigua D. S. Fletcher, 1974
- Zamarada fibulata D. S. Fletcher, 1974
- Zamarada flavicaput Warren, 1901
- Zamarada flavicosta Warren, 1897
- Zamarada fumosa Gaede, 1915
- Zamarada gamma D. S. Fletcher, 1958
- Zamarada glareosa Bastelberger, 1909
- Zamarada hero D. S. Fletcher, 1974
- Zamarada ignicosta Prout, 1912
- Zamarada incompta D. S. Fletcher, 1974
- Zamarada ixiaria Swinhoe, 1904
- Zamarada janata D. S. Fletcher, 1974
- Zamarada kompsotes D. S. Fletcher, 1974
- Zamarada labifera Prout, 1915
- Zamarada latimargo Warren, 1897
- Zamarada longidens D. S. Fletcher, 1963
- Zamarada melanopyga Herbulot, 1954
- Zamarada melpomene Oberthür, 1912
- Zamarada metrioscaphes Prout, 1912
- Zamarada mimesis D. S. Fletcher, 1974
- Zamarada onycha D. S. Fletcher, 1974
- Zamarada opala Carcasson, 1964
- Zamarada ordinaria Bethune-Baker, 1913
- Zamarada paxilla D. S. Fletcher, 1974
- Zamarada pelobasis D. S. Fletcher, 1974
- Zamarada penthesis D. S. Fletcher, 1974
- Zamarada plana Bastelberger, 1909
- Zamarada polyctemon Prout, 1932
- Zamarada protrusa Warren, 1897
- Zamarada psammites D. S. Fletcher, 1958
- Zamarada purimargo Prout, 1912
- Zamarada radula D. S. Fletcher, 1974
- Zamarada reflexaria (Walker, 1863)
- Zamarada rubrifascia Pinhey, 1962
- Zamarada rufilinearia Swinhoe, 1904
- Zamarada schalida D. S. Fletcher, 1974
- Zamarada scintillans Bastelberger, 1909
- Zamarada setosa D. S. Fletcher, 1974
- Zamarada seydeli D. S. Fletcher, 1974
- Zamarada sicula D. S. Fletcher, 1974
- Zamarada similis D. S. Fletcher, 1974
- Zamarada strigilecula D. S. Fletcher, 1974
- Zamarada subinterrupta Gaede, 1915
- Zamarada suda D. S. Fletcher, 1974
- Zamarada terpsichore Oberthür, 1912
- Zamarada thalia Oberthür, 1912
- Zamarada tricuspida D. S. Fletcher, 1974
- Zamarada unisona D. S. Fletcher, 1974
- Zamarada variola D. S. Fletcher, 1974
- Zamarada vigilans Prout, 1915
- Zamarada volsella D. S. Fletcher, 1974
- Zamarada vulpina Warren, 1897
- Zeuctoboarmia bipandata (Prout, 1915)
- Zeuctoboarmia contortilinea (Warren, 1897)
- Zeuctoboarmia smithi (Warren, 1902)

== Glyphipterigidae ==
- Chrysocentris chalcotypa (Bradley, 1965)
- Chrysocentris infuscata Ghesquière, 1940
- Chrysocentris phaeometalla Meyrick, 1937

== Gracillariidae ==
- Acrocercops bifasciata (Walsingham, 1891)
- Acrocercops cherimoliae Ghesquière, 1940
- Caloptilia maynei Ghesquière, 1940
- Caloptilia octopunctata (Turner, 1894)
- Caloptilia ptychospora (Meyrick, 1938)
- Cameraria landryi de Prins, 2012
- Cameraria perodeaui de Prins, 2012
- Cameraria zaira de Prins, 2012
- Hyloconis luki de Prins, 2012
- Neolithocolletis mayumbe de Prins, 2012
- Neolithocolletis nsengai de Prins, 2012
- Phyllocnistis cassiella Ghesquière, 1940
- Phyllocnistis citrella Stainton, 1856
- Phyllonorycter farensis De Prins & De Prins, 2007
- Stomphastis thraustica (Meyrick, 1908)

== Hepialidae ==
- Eudalaca ammon (Wallengren, 1860)
- Eudalaca holophaea (Hampson, 1910)
- Gorgopis libania (Stoll, 1781)

== Himantopteridae ==
- Semioptila hedydipna Kiriakoff, 1954
- Semioptila hyalina Talbot, 1926
- Semioptila macrodipteryx Kiriakoff, 1954
- Semioptila monochroma Hering, 1932
- Semioptila psalidoprocne Kiriakoff, 1954
- Semioptila stenopteryx Hering, 1932
- Semioptila torta Butler, 1887

== Hyblaeidae ==
- Hyblaea fontainei Berio, 1967
- Hyblaea occidentalium Holland, 1894

== Immidae ==
- Moca radiata (Walsingham, 1897)

== Lasiocampidae ==
- Anadiasa fuscofasciata (Aurivillius, 1922)
- Beralade curvistriga Hering, 1929
- Bombycopsis orthogramma Hering, 1932
- Bombycopsis venosa (Butler, 1895)
- Braura elgonensis (Kruck, 1940)
- Braura ligniclusa (Walker, 1865)
- Catalebeda tamsi Hering, 1932
- Cheligium choerocampoides (Holland, 1893)
- Cheligium nigrescens (Aurivillius, 1909)
- Chrysopsyche imparilis Aurivillius, 1905
- Chrysopsyche lamani Aurivillius, 1906
- Cleopatrina phocea (Druce, 1887)
- Epitrabala argyrostigma Hering, 1932
- Eucraera koellikerii (Dewitz, 1881)
- Eutricha morosa (Walker, 1865)
- Euwallengrenia reducta (Walker, 1855)
- Filiola dogma Zolotuhin & Gurkovich, 2009
- Filiola fulgurata (Aurivillius, 1909)
- Filiola lanceolata (Hering, 1932)
- Filiola occidentale (Strand, 1912)
- Gelo joannoui Zolotuhin & Prozorov, 2010
- Gonopacha brotoessa (Holland, 1893)
- Gonotrichidia modestissima Berio, 1937
- Grellada enigmatica (Hering, 1941)
- Grellada imitans (Aurivillius, 1893)
- Grellada marshalli (Aurivillius, 1902)
- Hypotrabala odonestioides Berio, 1937
- Hypotrabala regalis Tams, 1953
- Laeliopsis erythrura Aurivillius, 1914
- Lechriolepis leopoldi Hering, 1929
- Leipoxais batesi Bethune-Baker, 1927
- Leipoxais dolichoprygma Tams, 1931
- Leipoxais fuscofasciata Aurivillius, 1908
- Leipoxais haematidea (Snellen, 1872)
- Leipoxais ituria Bethune-Baker, 1909
- Leipoxais lipophemisma Tams, 1929
- Leipoxais marginepunctata Holland, 1893
- Leipoxais noctis (Druce, 1910)
- Leipoxais peraffinis Holland, 1893
- Leipoxais rufobrunnea Strand, 1912
- Leipoxais tolmera Tams, 1929
- Mallocampa audea (Druce, 1887)
- Mimopacha audeoudi Romieux, 1935
- Mimopacha brunnea Hering, 1941
- Mimopacha excavata Hering, 1935
- Mimopacha similis Hering, 1935
- Morongea arnoldi (Aurivillius, 1909)
- Morongea avoniffi (Tams, 1929)
- Morongea carnaria Zolotuhin & Prozorov, 2010
- Morongea flavipicta (Tams, 1929)
- Morongea lampara Zolotuhin & Prozorov, 2010
- Morongea mastodont Zolotuhin & Prozorov, 2010
- Muzunguja rectilineata (Aurivillius, 1900)
- Napta lutunguru Dufrane, 1939
- Nirbiana obscura (Hering, 1941)
- Odontocheilopteryx dollmani Tams, 1930
- Odontocheilopteryx gracifica Gurkovich & Zolotuhin, 2009
- Odontocheilopteryx maculata Aurivillius, 1905
- Odontocheilopteryx myxa Wallengren, 1860
- Odontocheilopteryx pattersoni Tams, 1926
- Odontocheilopteryx phoneus Hering, 1928
- Odontocheilopteryx pica Gurkovich & Zolotuhin, 2009
- Opisthodontia dannfelti Aurivillius, 1895
- Opisthodontia supramalis Zolotuhin & Prozorov, 2010
- Opisthoheza heza Zolotuhin & Prozorov, 2010
- Pachymeta semifasciata Aurivillius
- Pachymetana baldasseronii Berio, 1937
- Pachymetana custodella Kiriakoff, 1965
- Pachymetana guttata (Aurivillius, 1914)
- Pachymetana horridula (Tams, 1925)
- Pachyna satanas Zolotuhin & Gurkovich, 2009
- Pachyna subfascia (Walker, 1855)
- Pachypasa multipunctata (Hering, 1922)
- Pachytrina crestalina Zolotuhin & Gurkovich, 2009
- Pachytrina flamerchena Zolotuhin & Gurkovich, 2009
- Pachytrina gliharta Zolotuhin & Gurkovich, 2009
- Pachytrina honrathii (Dewitz, 1881)
- Pachytrina papyroides (Tams, 1936)
- Pachytrina philargyria (Hering, 1928)
- Pachytrina rubra (Tams, 1929)
- Pachytrina trihora Zolotuhin & Gurkovich, 2009
- Pachytrina wenigina Zolotuhin & Gurkovich, 2009
- Pallastica lateritia (Hering, 1928)
- Pallastica litlura Zolotuhin & Gurukovich, 2009
- Pallastica meloui (Riel, 1909)
- Pallastica mesoleuca (Strand, 1911)
- Pallastica pallens (Bethune-Baker, 1908)
- Pallastica pyrsocoma (Tams, 1936)
- Pallastica sericeofasciata (Aurivillius, 1921)
- Philotherma fuscescens Hampson, 1910
- Philotherma spargata (Holland, 1893)
- Philotherma vulpecula Strand, 1918
- Pseudolyra divisa Aurivillius, ????
- Pseudolyra lineadentata (Bethune-Baker, 1911)
- Pseudolyra major Hering, 1941
- Pseudolyra megista Tams, 1931
- Pseudolyra minima Hering, 1932
- Pseudometa choba (Druce, 1899)
- Pseudometa leonina Tams, 1929
- Pseudometa nigricans Aurivillius, 1925
- Pseudometa oinopa Tams, 1929
- Ptyssophlebia avis Berio, 1937
- Rhynchobombyx nasuta Aurivillius, 1908
- Seydelora semna (Hering, 1941)
- Sonitha alucard Zolotuhin & Prozorov, 2010
- Sonitha bernardii Zolotuhin & Prozorov, 2010
- Sonitha gelata Zolotuhin & Prozorov, 2010
- Sonitha integra Zolotuhin & Prozorov, 2010
- Sonitha libera (Aurivillius, 1914)
- Sonitha lila Zolotuhin & Prozorov, 2010
- Sonitha myoctona Zolotuhin & Prozorov, 2010
- Sonitha picassoi Zolotuhin & Prozorov, 2010
- Stenophatna hollandi (Tams, 1929)
- Stenophatna kahli (Tams, 1929)
- Stenophatna marshalli Aurivillius, 1909
- Stenophatna rothschildi (Tams, 1936)
- Stenophatna tamsi (Kiriakoff, 1963)
- Stoermeriana cervina (Aurivillius, 1927)
- Stoermeriana congoense (Aurivillius, 1908)
- Stoermeriana craterum Tams, 1929
- Stoermeriana distinguenda (Aurivillius, 1905)
- Stoermeriana gamma (Aurivillius, 1908)
- Stoermeriana graberi (Dewitz, 1881)
- Stoermeriana oinopa (Tams, 1936)
- Stoermeriana pachyla (Tams, 1936)
- Stoermeriana pygmaeorum Tams, 1929
- Streblote polydora (Druce, 1887)
- Theophasida obusta (Tams, 1929)
- Theophasida superba (Aurivillius, 1914)
- Theophasida valkyria Zolotuhin & Prozorov, 2010
- Trabala aethiopica (Strand, 1912)
- Trabala charon Druce, 1910
- Trabala prasinophena Tams, 1931
- Trichopisthia igneotincta (Aurivillius, 1909)

== Lemoniidae ==
- Sabalia barnsi Prout, 1918
- Sabalia tippelskirchi Karsch, 1898

== Limacodidae ==
- Afromiresa ustitermina (Hampson, 1910)
- Altha basalis West, 1940
- Apluda digramma Hering, 1929
- Baria elsa (Druce, 1887)
- Birthama saturata Kiriakoff, 1954
- Brachia argyrogramma Karsch, 1896
- Casphalia nigerrima Holland, 1893
- Chrysamma purpuripulcra Karsch, 1896
- Chrysopoloma albidiscalis Hampson, 1910
- Chrysopoloma flavoantennata Berio, 1937
- Chrysopoloma variegata Hering, 1937
- Crothaema mormopis Meyrick, 1934
- Crothaema ornata Romieux, 1934
- Crothaema schoutedeni Hering, 1954
- Crothaema trichromata West, 1937
- Ctenolita anacompa Karsch, 1896
- Ctenolita epargyra Karsch, 1896
- Ctenolita melanosticta (Bethune-Baker, 1909)
- Ctenolita tristis Hering, 1949
- Delorhachis denisae Dufrane, 1945
- Delorhachis mariae Dufrane, 1945
- Delorhachis viridiplaga Karsch, 1896
- Ectropa alberici Dufrane, 1945
- Halseyia rufilinea (Bethune-Baker, 1909)
- Halseyia seydeli (Hering, 1932)
- Latoia joiceyi Tams, 1929
- Latoia lutunguru Dufrane, 1945
- Latoia neglecta Hering, 1928
- Latoia vivida (Walker, 1865)
- Macroplectra meridionalis Hering, 1928
- Miresa basirufa Hering, 1941
- Miresa livida West, 1940
- Miresa semicalida Hampson, 1910
- Narosa talboti Tams, 1929
- Narosa trilinea Bethune-Baker, 1909
- Niphadolepis bipunctata Hering, 1929
- Niphadolepis luxurians Hering, 1928
- Niphadolepis schultzei Hering, 1932
- Niphadolepis viridissima Hering, 1829
- Omocena songeana West, 1940
- Omocena syrtis (Schaus & Clements, 1893)
- Parasa carnapi Karsch, 1899
- Parasa charopa Bethune-Baker, 1909
- Parasa divisa West, 1940
- Parasa lanceolata Hering, 1928
- Phorma limbata Kiriakoff, 1954
- Phorma subericolor Kiriakoff, 1954
- Pseudomantria flava Bethune-Baker, 1911
- Pseudomantria flavissima Hering, 1928
- Scotinochroa mesepirotica Tams, 1929
- Sporetolepis diachrysa Tams, 1929
- Stroter intermissa (Walker, 1865)
- Susica pyrocausta Hampson, 1910
- Tetraphleba ruficeps (Hampson, 1909)

== Lymantriidae ==
- Aclonophlebia poecilanthes (Collenette, 1931)
- Aroa achrodisca Hampson, 1910
- Aroa callista (Collenette, 1933)
- Aroa discalis Walker, 1855
- Batella acronictoides (Collenette, 1937)
- Batella katanga (Collenette, 1938)
- Batella muscosa (Holland, 1893)
- Batella parva Dall'Asta, 1981
- Bracharoa mixta (Snellen, 1872)
- Cropera phlebitis (Hampson, 1905)
- Cropera sericea (Hampson, 1910)
- Cropera seydeli (Hering, 1932)
- Cropera stilpnaroma Hering, 1926
- Cropera testacea Walker, 1855
- Cropera xanthophaes Collenette, 1960
- Crorema adspersa (Herrich-Schäffer, 1854)
- Crorema desperata Hering, 1929
- Crorema fuscinotata (Hampson, 1910)
- Crorema mentiens Walker, 1855
- Crorema ochracea (Snellen, 1872)
- Crorema sandoa Collenette, 1936
- Crorema staphylinochrous Hering, 1926
- Crorema submaculata Collenette, 1931
- Dasychira amydropa Collenette, 1960
- Dasychira aphanes Collenette, 1938
- Dasychira blastema Hering, 1926
- Dasychira chlororhina Collenette, 1938
- Dasychira chorista Hering, 1926
- Dasychira dasynota Collenette, 1938
- Dasychira gonophoroides Collenette, 1939
- Dasychira hodoepora Collenette, 1960
- Dasychira lulua Collenette, 1937
- Dasychira melarhina Collenette, 1938
- Dasychira pennatula (Fabricius, 1793)
- Dasychira phaea Collenette, 1960
- Dasychira punctifera (Walker, 1857)
- Dasychira rhabdogonia Collenette, 1938
- Dasychira soyensis Collenette, 1939
- Dasychira statheuta (Collenette, 1937)
- Dasychira stegmanni Grünberg, 1910
- Decelleria brachycera (Collenette, 1937)
- Dyasma thaumatopoeides (Schultze, 1934)
- Eudasychira abellii Dall'Asta, 1983
- Eudasychira bokuma (Collenette, 1960)
- Eudasychira calliprepes (Collenette, 1933)
- Eudasychira demoulini Dall'Asta, 1983
- Eudasychira dina (Hering, 1926)
- Eudasychira enigmatica Dall'Asta, 1983
- Eudasychira errata Dall'Asta, 1983
- Eudasychira eudela (Collenette, 1954)
- Eudasychira gainsfordi Dall'Asta, 2009
- Eudasychira georgiana (Fawcett, 1900)
- Eudasychira nadinae Dall'Asta, 1983
- Eudasychira sciodes (Collenette, 1960)
- Eudasychira shabana Dall'Asta, 1983
- Eudasychira subpolia Dall'Asta, 1983
- Eudasychira tshuapana Dall'Asta, 1983
- Eudasychira ultima Dall'Asta, 1983
- Eudasychira unicolora Dall'Asta, 1983
- Eudasychira vuattouxi Dall'Asta, 1983
- Euproctis aethiopica Snellen, 1872
- Euproctis aethodigmata Collenette, 1960
- Euproctis alberici (Dufrane, 1942)
- Euproctis apicipuncta (Holland, 1893)
- Euproctis bigutta Holland, 1893
- Euproctis butola Collenette, 1939
- Euproctis cerealces Collenette, 1960
- Euproctis conizona Collenette, 1933
- Euproctis cratera Collenette, 1937
- Euproctis cryphia Collenette, 1960
- Euproctis dewitzi (Grünberg, 1907)
- Euproctis falkensteini (Dewitz, 1881)
- Euproctis fulvipennis Hampson, 1910
- Euproctis mediosquamosa Bethune-Baker, 1909
- Euproctis molunduana Aurivillius, 1925
- Euproctis nessa Swinhoe, 1903
- Euproctis nigrosquamosa Bethune-Baker, 1911
- Euproctis palla (Holland, 1893)
- Euproctis pallida (Kirby, 1896)
- Euproctis panda Collenette, 1938
- Euproctis producta (Walker, 1863)
- Euproctis stenoptila Collenette, 1938
- Euproctis utilis Swinhoe, 1903
- Euproctoides acrisia Plötz, 1880
- Euproctoides pavonacea (Romieux, 1934)
- Griveaudyria ila (Swinhoe, 1904)
- Hemerophanes libyra (Druce, 1896)
- Heteronygmia strigitorna Hampson, 1910
- Homochira rendalli (Distant, 1897)
- Hyaloperina nudiuscula Aurivillius, 1904
- Jacksoniana striata (Collenette, 1937)
- Lacipa gemmata Distant, 1897
- Lacipa jefferyi (Collenette, 1931)
- Lacipa pulverea Distant, 1898
- Lacipa quadripunctata Dewitz, 1881
- Laelia bifascia Hampson, 1905
- Laelia bonaberiensis (Strand, 1915)
- Laelia diascia Hampson, 1905
- Laelia dochmia Collenette, 1960
- Laelia eutricha Collenette, 1931
- Laelia extorta (Distant, 1897)
- Laelia figlina Distant, 1899
- Laelia fracta Schaus & Clements, 1893
- Laelia gephyra (Hering, 1926)
- Laelia gigantea Hampson, 1910
- Laelia lusambo Collenette, 1960
- Laelia phenax (Collenette, 1932)
- Laelia pyrrhothrix Collenette, 1938
- Laelia rogersi Bethune-Baker, 1913
- Laelia siga Hering, 1926
- Laelia subrosea (Walker, 1855)
- Leptaroa fulvicolora Hampson, 1910
- Leucoma dubia (Aurivillius, 1900)
- Leucoma parva (Plötz, 1880)
- Leucoma sericea (Berio, 1937)
- Leucoperina atroguttata Aurivillius, 1909
- Lomadonta callipepla Collenette, 1960
- Lomadonta erythrina Holland, 1893
- Lymantria multiscripta Holland, 1893
- Lymantria vacillans Walker, 1855
- Marblepsis flabellaria (Fabricius, 1787)
- Mylantria xanthospila (Plötz, 1880)
- Naroma nigrolunata Collenette, 1931
- Naroma varipes (Walker, 1865)
- Neomardara africana (Holland, 1893)
- Olapa bipunctata (Holland, 1920)
- Olapa fulviceps Hampson, 1910
- Olapa makala Bethune-Baker, 1909
- Olapa sakania (Berio, 1937)
- Olapa tavetensis (Holland, 1892)
- Orgyia hopkinsi Collenette, 1937
- Otroeda hesperia (Cramer, 1779)
- Otroeda nerina (Drury, 1780)
- Otroeda papilionaria (Jordan, 1924)
- Otroeda planax (Drury, 1780)
- Otroeda vesperina Walker, 1854
- Paqueta basilewskyi Dall'Asta, 1981
- Paqueta brunneifascia Dall'Asta, 1981
- Paqueta infima (Holland, 1893)
- Paqueta sankuruensis Dall'Asta, 1981
- Paqueta subchloroscia Dall'Asta, 1981
- Parabatella polyploca (Collenette, 1960)
- Paramarbla beni (Bethune-Baker, 1909)
- Paramarbla catharia (Collenette, 1933)
- Paramarbla diplosticta (Rebel, 1914)
- Paramarbla hemileuca (Rebel, 1914)
- Paramarbla nyctemerina (Rebel, 1914)
- Pirga luteola Hering, 1926
- Pirga mnemosyne Rebel, 1914
- Porthesaroa lacipa Hering, 1926
- Porthesaroa maculata Collenette, 1938
- Porthesaroa noctua Hering, 1926
- Psalis pennulata (Fabricius, 1793)
- Pseudobazisa phaeophlebia (Hampson, 1910)
- Pseudonotodonta virescens (Möschler, 1887)
- Pteredoa plumosa Hampson, 1905
- Rahona albimaculata Dall'Asta, 1981
- Rahona bicornuta Dall'Asta, 1981
- Rahona brunnea Dall'Asta, 1981
- Rahona brunneicubitata Dall'Asta, 1981
- Rahona caeruleibasalis Dall'Asta, 1981
- Rahona collenettei Dall'Asta, 1981
- Rahona hayesi Dall'Asta, 1981
- Rahona hypnotoides (Collenette, 1957)
- Rahona ladburyi (Bethune-Baker, 1911)
- Rahona nigrofumata Dall'Asta, 1981
- Rahona seitzi (Hering, 1926)
- Rahona stauropa Dall'Asta, 1981
- Rahona stauropoeides (Collenette, 1960)
- Rahona subzairensis Dall'Asta, 1981
- Rahona unica Dall'Asta, 1981
- Rahona zairensis Dall'Asta, 1981
- Rhypopteryx dracontea (Romieux, 1935)
- Rhypopteryx fontainei Collenette, 1960
- Rhypopteryx hemiphanta Collenette, 1955
- Rhypopteryx minor (Collenette, 1938)
- Rhypopteryx psoloconiama Collenette, 1960
- Rhypopteryx psolozona (Collenette, 1938)
- Rhypopteryx romieuxi (Collenette, 1938)
- Rhypopteryx sordida Aurivillius, 1879
- Rhypopteryx uele Collenette, 1960
- Rhypopteryx xuthosticta (Collenette, 1938)
- Sphragista kitchingi (Bethune-Baker, 1909)
- Sphragista soloides Holland, 1920
- Stracena bananae (Butler, 1897)
- Stracena kamengo Collenette, 1936
- Stracena promelaena (Holland, 1893)
- Stracena striata Schultze, 1934
- Stracilla ghesquierei Collenette, 1937
- Stracilla translucida (Oberthür, 1880)
- Tamsita ochthoeba (Hampson, 1920)
- Viridichira brevistriata Dall'Asta, 1981
- Viridichira cameruna (Aurivillius, 1904)
- Viridichira longistriata (Hering, 1926)
- Viridichira ochrorhabda (Collenette, 1937)
- Viridichirana chlorophila (Hering, 1926)
- Viridichirana decellei Dall'Asta, 1981

== Metarbelidae ==
- Haberlandia clenchi Lehmann, 2011
- Haberlandia hulstaerti Lehmann, 2011
- Haberlandia lusamboensis Lehmann, 2011
- Haberlandia isakaensis Lehmann, 2011
- Haberlandia isiroensis Lehmann, 2011
- Haberlandia josephi Lehmann, 2011
- Haberlandia rudolphi Lehmann, 2011
- Haberlandia ueleensis Lehmann, 2011
- Kroonia politzari Lehmann, 2010
- Marshalliana latevittata Hering, 1949
- Moyencharia winteri Lehmann, 2013
- Paralebedella schultzei (Aurivillius, 1905)
- Salagena denigrata Gaede, 1929
- Salagena transversa Walker, 1865
- Shimonia fischeri Lehmann & Rajaei, 2013
- Shimonia oyiekeae Lehmann & Rajaei, 2013
- Shimonia splendida (D. S. Fletcher, 1968)
- Shimonia timberlakei Lehmann & Rajaei, 2013
- Teragra orphnina Hering, 1932

== Noctuidae ==
- Abrostola congolensis Dufay, 1958
- Abseudrapa metaphaearia (Walker, 1869)
- Aburina electa Karsch, 1896
- Aburina endoxantha Hampson, 1926
- Acantholipes acephala Strand, 1912
- Acantuerta ladina Jordan, 1926
- Achaea albilimba Berio, 1954
- Achaea basalis Berio, 1954
- Achaea basilewskyi Berio, 1954
- Achaea bergeri Berio, 1954
- Achaea boris (Geyer, 1837)
- Achaea catella Guenée, 1852
- Achaea catocaloides Guenée, 1852
- Achaea ezea (Cramer, 1779)
- Achaea finita (Guenée, 1852)
- Achaea fontainei Berio, 1956
- Achaea illustrata Walker, 1858
- Achaea leucopera Druce, 1912
- Achaea lienardi (Boisduval, 1833)
- Achaea macronephra (Berio, 1956)
- Achaea mormoides Walker, 1858
- Achaea rothkirchi (Strand, 1914)
- Acontia aurelia Hacker, Legrain & Fibiger, 2008
- Acontia callima Bethune-Baker, 1911
- Acontia chrysoproctis (Hampson, 1902)
- Acontia citrelinea Bethune-Baker, 1911
- Acontia discoidea Hopffer, 1857
- Acontia metaxantha (Hampson, 1910)
- Acontia nephele Hampson, 1911
- Acontia niphogona (Hampson, 1909)
- Acontia obliqua Hacker, Legrain & Fibiger, 2010
- Acontia secta Guenée, 1852
- Acontia transfigurata Wallengren, 1856
- Acontia wahlbergi Wallengren, 1856
- Acrapex brunnea Hampson, 1910
- Acrapex holoscota Hampson, 1914
- Acrapex rhabdoneura Hampson, 1910
- Acrapex spoliata (Walker, 1863)
- Acrapex unicolora (Hampson, 1910)
- Aegocera fervida (Walker, 1854)
- Aegocera geometrica Hampson, 1910
- Aegocera jordani Kiriakoff, 1955
- Aegocera obliqua Mabille, 1893
- Aegocera rectilinea Boisduval, 1836
- Aegocera tigrina (Druce, 1882)
- Aegocera tricolora Bethune-Baker, 1909
- Agoma trimenii (Felder, 1874)
- Agrotis isopleura Hampson, 1902
- Aletia laevusta (Berio, 1955)
- Amazonides invertita Berio, 1962
- Amyna axis Guenée, 1852
- Amyna griseola (Snellen, 1872)
- Andrhippuris caudaequina Karsch, 1895
- Anedhella stigmata (Janse, 1938)
- Anomis auragoides (Guenée, 1852)
- Anomis bidentata (Hampson, 1910)
- Anomis elegans Berio, 1956
- Anomis melanosema Berio, 1956
- Anomis modesta Berio, 1956
- Anomis subfuscata Berio, 1956
- Apaegocera aurantipennis Hampson, 1912
- Asota chionea (Mabille, 1878)
- Asota concinnula (Mabille, 1878)
- Aspidifrontia anomala Berio, 1955
- Aspidifrontia cinerea Berio, 1966
- Aspidifrontia contrastata A. E. Prout, 1921
- Aspidifrontia glaucescens Hampson, 1905
- Aspidifrontia semipallida Hampson, 1902
- Athetis atristicta Hampson, 1918
- Athetis heliastis Hampson, 1909
- Athetis melanosticta Hampson, 1909
- Athetis satellitia (Hampson, 1902)
- Attatha ethiopica Hampson, 1910
- Avitta ceromacra Berio, 1956
- Brephos nyassana (Bartel, 1903)
- Brephos straeleniana (Kiriakoff, 1954)
- Busseola fusca (Fuller, 1901)
- Caligatus angasii Wing, 1850
- Calliodes pretiosissima Holland, 1892
- Callophisma flavicornis Hampson, 1913
- Callopistria latreillei (Duponchel, 1827)
- Carpostalagma chalybeata Talbot, 1929
- Carpostalagma viridis (Plötz, 1880)
- Caryonopera bergeri Berio, 1956
- Cerocala basilewskyi Berio, 1954
- Cerocala mindingiensis Romieux, 1937
- Cerynea thermesialis (Walker, 1866)
- Chaetostephana rendalli (Rothschild, 1896)
- Charitosemia geraldi (Kirby, 1896)
- Choeropais jucunda (Jordan, 1904)
- Chrysodeixis acuta (Walker, [1858])
- Compsotata janmoullei (Kiriakoff, 1954)
- Condica capensis (Guenée, 1852)
- Condica conducta (Walker, 1857)
- Conservula cinisigna de Joannis, 1906
- Crameria amabilis (Drury, 1773)
- Ctenoplusia fracta (Walker, 1857)
- Ctenusa pallida (Hampson, 1902)
- Cucullia katangae Romieux, 1943
- Cyligramma fluctuosa (Drury, 1773)
- Cyligramma latona (Cramer, 1775)
- Cyligramma limacina (Guérin-Méneville, 1832)
- Cyligramma magus (Guérin-Méneville, [1844])
- Devena strigania Hampson, 1926
- Dicerogastra proleuca (Hampson, 1913)
- Digama meridionalis Swinhoe, 1907
- Digama pandaensis Romieux, 1935
- Diomea disticta Bethune-Baker, 1909
- Dysgonia algira (Linnaeus, 1767)
- Dysgonia goniophora (Hampson, 1910)
- Dysgonia irregulata Berio, 1956
- Dysgonia palpalis (Walker, 1865)
- Dysgonia properans (Walker, 1858)
- Dysgonia proxima (Hampson, 1902)
- Dysgonia torrida (Guenée, 1852)
- Effractilis effracta (Distant, 1898)
- Egnasia apicata Berio, 1956
- Egnasia dimorfica Berio, 1956
- Egnasia hypomochla D. S. Fletcher, 1963
- Egnasia mimetica Berio, 1956
- Egybolis vaillantina (Stoll, 1790)
- Entomogramma pardus Guenée, 1852
- Erebus macrops (Linnaeus, 1767)
- Erebus walkeri (Butler, 1875)
- Ethiopica polyastra Hampson, 1909
- Ethiopica subpurpurea Kiriakoff, 1954
- Eublemma almaviva Berio, 1947
- Eublemma anachoresis (Wallengren, 1863)
- Eublemma decora (Walker, 1869)
- Eublemma exigua (Walker, 1858)
- Eublemma heterogramma (Mabille, 1881)
- Eublemma orthogramma (Snellen, 1872)
- Eublemma scitula (Rambur, 1833)
- Eudocima divitiosa (Walker, 1869)
- Eudocima fullonia (Clerck, 1764)
- Eudocima materna (Linnaeus, 1767)
- Eudrapa fontainei Berio, 1956
- Eudrapa maculata Berio, 1956
- Eudrapa mollis Walker, 1857
- Euheterospila antennalis Strand, 1912
- Euippodes diversa Berio, 1956
- Euippodes euprepes Hampson, 1926
- Euippodes perundulata Berio, 1956
- Eustrotia micropis Hampson, 1910
- Eutelia gabriela Hampson, 1912
- Eutelia quadriliturata Walker, 1869
- Eutelia symphonica Hampson, 1902
- Feliniopsis africana (Schaus & Clements, 1893)
- Feliniopsis connivens (Felder & Rogenhofer, 1874)
- Feliniopsis duponti (Laporte, 1974)
- Feliniopsis grisea (Laporte, 1973)
- Feliniopsis gueneei (Laporte, 1973)
- Feliniopsis hosplitoides (Laporte, 1979)
- Feliniopsis laportei Hacker & Fibiger, 2007
- Feliniopsis nigribarbata (Hampson, 1908)
- Feliniopsis satellitis (Berio, 1974)
- Feliniopsis thoracica (Walker, 1858)
- Gesonia obeditalis Walker, 1859
- Gesonia stictigramma Hampson, 1926
- Giria pectinicornis (Bethune-Baker, 1909)
- Godasa sidae (Fabricius, 1793)
- Gracilodes finissima Berio, 1956
- Grammodes congenita Walker, 1858
- Grammodes geometrica (Fabricius, 1775)
- Grammodes stolida (Fabricius, 1775)
- Helicoverpa armigera (Hübner, [1808])
- Heliophisma klugii (Boisduval, 1833)
- Heraclia aemulatrix (Westwood, 1881)
- Heraclia aurantiaca Kiriakoff, 1975
- Heraclia buchholzi (Plötz, 1880)
- Heraclia butleri (Walker, 1869)
- Heraclia flavipennis (Bartel, 1903)
- Heraclia geryon (Fabricius, 1781)
- Heraclia gruenbergi (Wichgraf, 1911)
- Heraclia hornimani (Druce, 1880)
- Heraclia hypercompoides (Butler, 1895)
- Heraclia jugans (Jordan, 1913)
- Heraclia karschi (Holland, 1897)
- Heraclia kivuensis Kiriakoff, 1973
- Heraclia longipennis (Walker, 1854)
- Heraclia medeba (Druce, 1880)
- Heraclia monslunensis (Hampson, 1901)
- Heraclia nobela Kiriakoff, 1974
- Heraclia pallida (Walker, 1854)
- Heraclia pampata Kiriakoff, 1974
- Heraclia pardalina (Walker, 1869)
- Heraclia poggei (Dewitz, 1879)
- Heraclia superba (Butler, 1875)
- Heraclia zenkeri (Karsch, 1895)
- Hespagarista caudata (Dewitz, 1879)
- Hespagarista eburnea Jordan, 1915
- Hypena laetalis Walker, 1859
- Hypena leucosticta Bethune-Baker, 1909
- Hypena poliopera Bethune-Baker, 1909
- Hypena semilutea (Snellen, 1872)
- Hypena senialis Guenée, 1854
- Hypocala deflorata (Fabricius, 1794)
- Hypoplexia algoa (Felder & Rogenhofer, 1874)
- Hypopyra allardi (Oberthür, 1878)
- Hypopyra capensis Herrich-Schäffer, 1854
- Hypotuerta transiens (Hampson, 1901)
- Isadelphina mariaeclarae Kiriakoff, 1954
- Leucania brantsii Snellen, 1872
- Leucania insulicola Guenée, 1852
- Leucania phaea Hampson, 1902
- Leucania prominens (Walker, 1856)
- Leucania rhabdophora Hampson, 1902
- Leucania tacuna Felder & Rogenhofer, 1874
- Leucovis alba (Rothschild, 1897)
- Libystica woerdenialis (Snellen, 1872)
- Lithacodia blandula (Guenée, 1862)
- Lophoptera methyalea (Hampson, 1902)
- Manga melanodonta (Hampson, 1910)
- Marcipa accentifera Pelletier, 1975
- Marcipa acutangula Pelletier, 1975
- Marcipa aequatorialis Pelletier, 1975
- Marcipa bergeri Pelletier, 1975
- Marcipa kirdii Pelletier, 1975
- Marcipa mariaeclarae Pelletier, 1975
- Marcipalina berioi (Pelletier, 1975)
- Marcipalina hayesi (Pelletier, 1975)
- Marcipalina laportei (Pelletier, 1975)
- Masalia bimaculata (Moore, 1888)
- Masalia cheesmanae Seymour, 1972
- Masalia flavistrigata (Hampson, 1903)
- Masalia funebris (Berio, 1962)
- Masalia galatheae (Wallengren, 1856)
- Masalia leucosticta (Hampson, 1902)
- Masalia sublimis (Berio, 1962)
- Masalia transvaalica (Distant, 1902)
- Massaga hesparia (Cramer, 1775)
- Massaga maritona Butler, 1868
- Massaga monteirona Butler, 1874
- Massaga tenuifascia (Hampson, 1910)
- Matopo tamsi Kiriakoff, 1954
- Maxera lophocera (Hampson, 1910)
- Mazuca amoena Jordan, 1933
- Mazuca strigicincta Walker, 1866
- Melanephia trista (Snellen, 1872)
- Mentaxya albifrons (Geyer, 1837)
- Mentaxya basilewskyi (Berio, 1955)
- Mentaxya bergeri (Berio, 1955)
- Mentaxya ignicollis (Walker, 1857)
- Mentaxya leroyi (Berio, 1955)
- Mentaxya percurvata (Berio, 1955)
- Metagarista maenas (Herrich-Schäffer, 1853)
- Metagarista triphaenoides Walker, 1854
- Micragrotis interstriata (Hampson, 1902)
- Micraxylia distalis Berio, 1962
- Micraxylia transfixa Berio, 1963
- Micraxylia varians Berio, 1972
- Midea pruinosa (Snellen, 1872)
- Miniodes discolor Guenée, 1852
- Misa cosmetica Karsch, 1898
- Mitrophrys barnsi Joicey & Talbot, 1921
- Mitrophrys gynandra Jordan, 1913
- Mitrophrys menete (Cramer, 1775)
- Mocis conveniens (Walker, 1858)
- Mocis frugalis (Fabricius, 1775)
- Mocis mayeri (Boisduval, 1833)
- Mocis mutuaria (Walker, 1858)
- Mocis persinuosa (Hampson, 1910)
- Mocis repanda (Fabricius, 1794)
- Mocis undata (Fabricius, 1775)
- Naarda tandoana (Bethune-Baker, 1911)
- Neostichtis nigricostata (Hampson, 1908)
- Nodaria melaleuca Hampson, 1902
- Nyodes brevicornis (Walker, 1857)
- Odontodes aleuca Guenée, 1852
- Ogovia pudens (Holland, 1894)
- Ogovia tavetensis Holland, 1892
- Omphaloceps triangularis (Mabille, 1893)
- Ophiusa gonoptera Hampson, 1910
- Ophiusa inangulata (Gaede, 1917)
- Ophiusa mejanesi (Guenée, 1852)
- Ophiusa mimetica (Berio, 1954)
- Ophiusa overlaeti Berio, 1956
- Ophiusa pseudotirhaca (Berio, 1956)
- Ophiusa rogata (Berio, 1954)
- Ophiusa tettensis (Hopffer, 1857)
- Ophiusa xylochroa (Druce, 1912)
- Oraesia cerne (Fawcett, 1916)
- Oruza latifera (Walker, 1869)
- Ozarba africana Berio, 1940
- Ozarba chryseiplaga Hampson, 1910
- Ozarba hemichrysea Hampson, 1910
- Ozarba phaeocroa Hampson, 1910
- Pandesma muricolor Berio, 1966
- Pangrapta dulcis Berio, 1956
- Pangrapta laevis Berio, 1956
- Parachalciope benitensis (Holland, 1894)
- Parachalciope emiplaneta Berio, 1954
- Parachalciope euclidicola (Walker, 1858)
- Parasoloe tetrasticta Kiriakoff, 1954
- Paratuerta undulata Berio, 1970
- Pericyma mendax (Walker, 1858)
- Pericyma polygramma Hampson, 1913
- Phaegorista prouti Joicey & Talbot, 1921
- Phaegorista similis Walker, 1869
- Phlogochroa basilewskyi Berio, 1956
- Phlogochroa fontainei Berio, 1956
- Phlogochroa pyrochroa (Bethune-Baker, 1909)
- Phytometra africana (Snellen, 1872)
- Phytometra nigrogemmea Romieux, 1943
- Plecoptera androconiata Hampson, 1926
- Plecoptera melanoscia Hampson, 1926
- Polydesma collusoria (Berio, 1954)
- Polydesma umbricola Boisduval, 1833
- Pseudoarcte melanis (Mabille, 1890)
- Pseudogiria angulata (Bethune-Baker, 1909)
- Pseudospiris paidiformis Butler, 1895
- Pseudotuerta argyrochlora (Carcasson, 1964)
- Radara subcupralis (Walker, [1866])
- Ramesodes divisa (Hampson, 1902)
- Rhanidophora aethiops (Grünberg, 1907)
- Rhanidophora ridens Hampson, 1902
- Rhanidophora septipunctata Bethune-Baker, 1909
- Rivula invertita (Berio, 1956)
- Sarmatia indenta Bethune-Baker, 1909
- Sarothroceras banaka (Plötz, 1880)
- Schausia dambuza Kiriakoff, 1975
- Schausia gladiatoria (Holland, 1893)
- Schausia leona (Schaus, 1893)
- Schausia mantatisi Kiriakoff, 1975
- Sciatta debeauxi (Berio, 1937)
- Sciomesa scotochroa (Hampson, 1914)
- Sesamia albivena Hampson, 1902
- Sesamia tosta Snellen, 1872
- Simplicia inflexalis Guenée, 1854
- Soloe trigutta Walker, 1854
- Soloella guttivaga (Walker, 1854)
- Sphingomorpha chlorea (Cramer, 1777)
- Spirama glaucescens (Butler, 1893)
- Spodoptera littoralis (Boisduval, 1833)
- Stictoptera conturbata (Walker, 1869)
- Stilbotis babaulti Laporte, 1984
- Stilbotis isopleuroides Berio, 1967
- Stilbotis nigra Berio, 1963
- Stilbotis rubra (Berio, 1977)
- Sypnoides flandriana (Berio, 1954)
- Tachosa acronyctoides Walker, 1869
- Tathorhynchus plumbea (Distant, 1898)
- Tavia polycyma Hampson, 1926
- Thiacidas acronictoides (Berio, 1950)
- Thiacidas mukim (Berio, 1977)
- Thyas androgyna (Berio, 1954)
- Thyas parallelipipeda (Guenée, 1852)
- Thyas rubricata (Holland, 1894)
- Thysanoplusia cupreomicans (Hampson, 1909)
- Thysanoplusia indicator (Walker, [1858])
- Tolna alboapicata Berio, 1956
- Tolna chionopera (Druce, 1912)
- Tolna versicolor Walker, 1869
- Tolnaopsis eusciasta Hampson, 1926
- Tracheplexia conservuloides Berio, 1966
- Trichopalpina simplex Berio, 1956
- Trichopalpina zethesia Hampson, 1926
- Trichoplusia gorilla (Holland, 1894)
- Trichoplusia spoliata (Walker, 1858)
- Trigonodes hyppasia (Cramer, 1779)
- Tuerta chrysochlora Walker, 1869
- Tycomarptes inferior (Guenée, 1852)
- Vietteania torrentium (Guenée, 1852)
- Wolframmeyia imperialis (Grünberg, 1910)
- Xoria orthogramma (Bethune-Baker, 1909)
- Yidalpta selenialis (Snellen, 1872)

== Nolidae ==
- Blenina chrysochlora (Walker, 1865)
- Bryophilopsis hamula (Snellen, 1872)
- Characoma sexilinea (Bethune-Baker, 1909)
- Earias biplaga Walker, 1866
- Eligma bettiana Prout, 1923
- Eligma hypsoides (Walker, 1869)
- Hypodeva superba (Druce, 1911)
- Maurilia arcuata (Walker, [1858])
- Metaleptina nigribasis Holland, 1893
- Negeta luminosa (Walker, 1858)
- Negeta ochreoplaga (Bethune-Baker, 1909)
- Nola chia (Holland, 1894)
- Nola omphalota (Hampson, 1903)
- Odontestis mesonephele (Bethune-Baker, 1909)
- Ophiosema jansei Romieux, 1943
- Petrinia lignosa Walker, 1869

== Notodontidae ==
- Achaera ochribasis (Hampson, 1910)
- Acrasiella hypochlora (Kiriakoff, 1960)
- Afrocerura cameroona (Bethune-Baker, 1927)
- Afrocerura leonensis (Hampson, 1910)
- Afroplitis bergeri (Viette, 1954)
- Afroplitis dasychirina (Gaede, 1928)
- Afropydna distincta Kiriakoff, 1961
- Afropydna indistincta (Gaede, 1928)
- Afropydna witteana (Kiriakoff, 1954)
- Amphiphalera leuconephra Hampson, 1910
- Anaphe etiennei Schouteden, 1912
- Anaphe panda (Boisduval, 1847)
- Anaphe perobscura Berio, 1937
- Anaphe subsordida Butler, 1893
- Anaphe venata Butler, 1878
- Anciera postalba Kiriakoff, 1962
- Anciera roseiventris Kiriakoff, 1962
- Andocidia tabernaria Kiriakoff, 1958
- Antheua croceipuncta Hampson, 1910
- Antheua delicata Bethune-Baker, 1911
- Antheua dimorpha Janse, 1920
- Antheua elongata Gaede, 1928
- Antheua encausta (Hampson, 1910)
- Antheua gallans (Karsch, 1895)
- Antheua ornata (Walker, 1865)
- Antheua rufovittata (Aurivillius, 1901)
- Antheua simplex Walker, 1855
- Antheua tricolor Walker, 1855
- Antheua trifasciata (Hampson, 1909)
- Antheua trimacula Kiriakoff, 1954
- Antheua woerdeni (Snellen, 1872)
- Aoba tosta Kiriakoff, 1965
- Aprosdocetos inexpectata (Rothschild, 1917)
- Archinadata aurivilliusi (Kiriakoff, 1954)
- Archistilbia cineracea Kiriakoff, 1954
- Archistilbia ochracea Kiriakoff, 1962
- Arciera grisea (Holland, 1893)
- Arciera lanuginosa (Rothschild, 1917)
- Arciera phragmatoecioides (Rothschild, 1917)
- Astaura umbrosa Kiriakoff, 1964
- Atrasana basistriga Kiriakoff, 1960
- Atrasana centralis Kiriakoff, 1960
- Atrasana grisea (Gaede, 1928)
- Atrasana lignea Kiriakoff, 1965
- Baliopteryx aeruginosa (Gaede, 1928)
- Baliopteryx argyrophora (Hampson, 1910)
- Batempa plana Kiriakoff, 1962
- Bilulua atricollis Kiriakoff, 1954
- Bilulua strigata Kiriakoff, 1954
- Bisolita brunneifascia (Hampson, 1910)
- Bisolita interna (Kiriakoff, 1961)
- Bisolita strigata (Aurivillius, 1906)
- Boscawenia incerta (Schultze, 1934)
- Boscawenia jaspidea (Schultze, 1934)
- Bostrychogyna argenteopicta Kiriakoff, 1960
- Bostrychogyna bella (Bethune-Baker, 1913)
- Bostrychogyna oneida Kiriakoff, 1964
- Brachychira argentina Kiriakoff, 1955
- Brachychira argyrosticta Kiriakoff, 1954
- Brachychira dives Kiriakoff, 1960
- Brachychira dormitans Berio, 1937
- Brachychira excellens (Rothschild, 1917)
- Brachychira ligata Kiriakoff, 1955
- Brachychira lununigera Kiriakoff, 1954
- Brachychira numenius Kiriakoff, 1955
- Brachychira pretiosa Kiriakoff, 1962
- Brachychira subargentea Kiriakoff, 1955
- Catarctia eos (Kiriakoff, 1955)
- Cerurina marshalli (Hampson, 1910)
- Chlorocalliope calliope (Hampson, 1910)
- Chlorocalliope margarethae Kiriakoff, 1958
- Chlorochadisra beltista (Tams, 1930)
- Chlorochadisra umbra (Kiriakoff, 1954)
- Clostera leloupi (Kiriakoff, 1954)
- Clostera ochracearia Kiriakoff, 1954
- Crestonica circulosa (Gaede, 1928)
- Daulopaectes trichosa (Hampson, 1910)
- Deinarchia agramma (Hampson, 1910)
- Deriddera margarethae Kiriakoff, 1955
- Desmeocraera albicans Gaede, 1928
- Desmeocraera analis Kiriakoff, 1954
- Desmeocraera annulosa Gaede, 1928
- Desmeocraera basalis Distant, 1899
- Desmeocraera brumata Kiriakoff, 1964
- Desmeocraera brunneicosta Gaede, 1928
- Desmeocraera chloeropsis (Holland, 1893)
- Desmeocraera clenchi Kiriakoff, 1958
- Desmeocraera collenettei Kiriakoff, 1954
- Desmeocraera congoana Aurivillius, 1900
- Desmeocraera decorata (Wichgraf, 1922)
- Desmeocraera dispar Kiriakoff, 1964
- Desmeocraera esmeraldina Kiriakoff, 1958
- Desmeocraera falsa (Holland, 1893)
- Desmeocraera formosa Kiriakoff, 1958
- Desmeocraera frustrata Kiriakoff, 1964
- Desmeocraera galaia Kiriakoff, 1965
- Desmeocraera geminata Gaede, 1928
- Desmeocraera glauca Gaede, 1928
- Desmeocraera hebe Kiriakoff, 1964
- Desmeocraera helena Kiriakoff, 1962
- Desmeocraera holitrix Kiriakoff, 1958
- Desmeocraera ingens Kiriakoff, 1958
- Desmeocraera inquisitrix Kiriakoff, 1958
- Desmeocraera inspiciens Kiriakoff, 1962
- Desmeocraera interpellatrix (Wallengren, 1860)
- Desmeocraera intricata Kiriakoff, 1964
- Desmeocraera invaria Kiriakoff, 1958
- Desmeocraera irregularis Kiriakoff, 1960
- Desmeocraera latex (Druce, 1901)
- Desmeocraera latifasciata Gaede, 1928
- Desmeocraera leucosticta (Hampson, 1910)
- Desmeocraera octoginta (Hampson, 1910)
- Desmeocraera pallidimargo Kiriakoff, 1962
- Desmeocraera pauliveronensis Kiriakoff, 1958
- Desmeocraera percontatrix Kiriakoff, 1958
- Desmeocraera phoebe Kiriakoff, 1964
- Desmeocraera postulatrix Kiriakoff, 1958
- Desmeocraera principalis Kiriakoff, 1958
- Desmeocraera procreatrix Kiriakoff, 1962
- Desmeocraera propinqua (Holland, 1893)
- Desmeocraera psittacina Kiriakoff, 1964
- Desmeocraera reclamatrix Kiriakoff, 1958
- Desmeocraera retiarius Kiriakoff, 1958
- Desmeocraera rogatrix Kiriakoff, 1958
- Desmeocraera sagittata Gaede, 1928
- Desmeocraera squamipennis (Holland, 1893)
- Desmeocraera subvaria Kiriakoff, 1958
- Desmeocraera varia (Walker, 1855)
- Desmeocraera venusta Kiriakoff, 1954
- Desmeocraera weberiana Kiriakoff, 1958
- Desmeocraerula basimacula Kiriakoff, 1954
- Desmeocraerula inconspicuana Strand, 1912
- Desmeocraerula senicula Kiriakoff, 1963
- Desmeocraerula viridipicta Kiriakoff, 1963
- Diopeithes barnesi Kiriakoff, 1958
- Disracha synceros Kiriakoff, 1962
- Drapetides uniformis (Swinhoe, 1907)
- Elaphrodes duplex (Gaede, 1928)
- Elaphrodes lactea (Gaede, 1932)
- Elaphrodes nephocrossa Bethune-Baker, 1909
- Enomotarcha adversa (Karsch, 1895)
- Enomotarcha apicalis (Aurivillius, 1925)
- Enomotarcha chloana (Holland, 1893)
- Enomotarcha heterochroma Kiriakoff, 1958
- Enomotarcha vulcanica Kiriakoff, 1958
- Epanaphe bergeri Kiriakoff, 1970
- Epanaphe candezei (Hulstaert, 1924)
- Epanaphe carteri (Walsingham, 1885)
- Epanaphe clarilla Aurivillius, 1904
- Epanaphe maynei (Hulstaert, 1924)
- Epanaphe moloneyi (Druce, 1887)
- Epanaphe nigricincta (Hulstaert, 1924)
- Epanaphe parva (Aurivillius, 1891)
- Epanaphe unifasciata (Hulstaert, 1924)
- Epanaphe vuilleti (de Joannis, 1907)
- Epicerura bivittata (Kiriakoff, 1954)
- Epicerura pergrisea (Hampson, 1910)
- Epicerura steniptera (Hampson, 1910)
- Epidonta brunneomixta (Mabille, 1897)
- Epidonta decipiens (Kiriakoff, 1960)
- Epidonta hulstaerti Kiriakoff, 1962
- Epidonta inconspicua Kiriakoff, 1962
- Epidonta punctata Kiriakoff, 1962
- Epidonta transversa (Gaede, 1928)
- Epimetula albipuncta (Gaede, 1928)
- Epimetula melina Kiriakoff, 1964
- Epimetula stipatrix (Kiriakoff, 1962)
- Epitrotonotus vilis (Holland, 1893)
- Eurystaura brunnea Janse, 1920
- Eurystaura erecta Gaede, 1928
- Eurystaura flava Gaede, 1928
- Eurystaurella subaequa Kiriakoff, 1962
- Eurystauridia fusconebulosa (Kiriakoff, 1962)
- Eurystauridia olivacea (Gaede, 1928)
- Eurystauridia pinto (Kiriakoff, 1962)
- Eutimia marpissa Wallengren, 1858
- Fentonina schoutedeni Viette, 1954
- Gaedeina alternata (Romieux, 1943)
- Gaedeina romieuxi (Kiriakoff, 1960)
- Galona serena Karsch, 1895
- Gargettina longivitta (Kiriakoff, 1962)
- Heraia thalassina (Hampson, 1910)
- Iphigeniella prasina Kiriakoff, 1962
- Janthinisca flavescens Kiriakoff, 1960
- Janthinisca flavipennis (Hampson, 1910)
- Janthinisca lilacea Kiriakoff, 1959
- Liriochroa divergens (Kiriakoff, 1954)
- Lomela pudica Kiriakoff, 1962
- Lopiena indecora (Kiriakoff, 1949)
- Lopiena ochracea (Bethune-Baker, 1911)
- Macronadata inculta Kiriakoff, 1964
- Macrosenta longicauda Holland, 1893
- Macrosenta rosella Kiriakoff, 1964
- Macrosenta undulata Kiriakoff, 1965
- Mesonadata quinquemaculata Kiriakoff, 1960
- Metopolophota epinephela Bethune-Baker, 1909
- Metopteryx atribasalis (Kiriakoff, 1964)
- Microchadisra angustipennis Kiriakoff, 1960
- Notoxantha sesamiodes Hampson, 1910
- Odontoperas archonta Kiriakoff, 1959
- Odontoperas bergeri Kiriakoff, 1969
- Odontoperas caecimacula Kiriakoff, 1962
- Odontoperas fontainei Kiriakoff, 1960
- Odontoperas luteimacula Kiriakoff, 1964
- Odontoperas rubricosta Kiriakoff, 1959
- Omocerina orientalis (Kiriakoff, 1954)
- Oreocerura dissodectes (Kiriakoff, 1958)
- Otpada recussa Kiriakoff, 1965
- Paradiastema nigrocincta Aurivillius, 1901
- Paradrallia punctigera Hulstaert, 1924
- Paradrallia rhodesi Bethune-Baker, 1908
- Pararhenea viridescens Kiriakoff, 1960
- Parastaura divisa Gaede, 1928
- Parastaura mediobrunnea Kiriakoff, 1962
- Paulisana rufina Kiriakoff, 1960
- Peratodonta brunnea Aurivillius, 1904
- Peratodonta extensa Gaede, 1928
- Peratodonta olivaceorosea Kiriakoff, 1962
- Phalera atrata (Grünberg, 1907)
- Phalera imitata Druce, 1896
- Phalera lydenburgi Distant, 1899
- Pittheides chloauchena (Holland, 1893)
- Psalisodes concolora (Bethune-Baker, 1909)
- Pseudobarobata angulata Gaede, 1928
- Pseudorethona albicans (Walker, 1855)
- Ptilura argyraspis Holland, 1893
- Pycnographa netrioides Kiriakoff, 1962
- Pycnographa tamarix Kiriakoff, 1958
- Pygaerina mediopurpurea Kiriakoff, 1960
- Pygaerina radiata Kiriakoff, 1965
- Rhenea rufescens Kiriakoff, 1954
- Rosinella rosinaria (Hampson, 1910)
- Scalmicauda alboterminalis Kiriakoff, 1962
- Scalmicauda aliena Kiriakoff, 1962
- Scalmicauda confusa Kiriakoff, 1959
- Scalmicauda costalis Kiriakoff, 1965
- Scalmicauda curvilinea Kiriakoff, 1959
- Scalmicauda decorata Kiriakoff, 1962
- Scalmicauda ectomelinos Kiriakoff, 1962
- Scalmicauda geometrica Kiriakoff, 1969
- Scalmicauda ignicolor Kiriakoff, 1964
- Scalmicauda molestula Kiriakoff, 1959
- Scalmicauda obliterata Kiriakoff, 1962
- Scalmicauda obscurior Gaede, 1928
- Scalmicauda oreas Kiriakoff, 1958
- Scalmicauda orthogramma Kiriakoff, 1960
- Scalmicauda ovalis Kiriakoff, 1965
- Scalmicauda paucinotata Kiriakoff, 1959
- Scalmicauda remmia Kiriakoff, 1959
- Scalmicauda subfusca Kiriakoff, 1959
- Scalmicauda uniarcuata Kiriakoff, 1962
- Scalmicauda uniarculinea Kiriakoff, 1965
- Scalmicauda venustissima Kiriakoff, 1969
- Scalmicauda vulpinaria Kiriakoff, 1965
- Scarnica albonotata Kiriakoff, 1962
- Scrancia agrostes Kiriakoff, 1962
- Scrancia angustissima Kiriakoff, 1962
- Scrancia argyrochroa Kiriakoff, 1962
- Scrancia atrifasciata Gaede, 1928
- Scrancia corticalis Kiriakoff, 1965
- Scrancia erythrops Kiriakoff, 1962
- Scrancia expleta Kiriakoff, 1962
- Scrancia galactopera Kiriakoff, 1962
- Scrancia leucopera Hampson, 1910
- Scrancia leucosparsa Kiriakoff, 1964
- Scrancia margaritacea Gaede, 1928
- Scrancia melierax Kiriakoff, 1965
- Scrancia modesta Holland, 1893
- Scrancia oculata Kiriakoff, 1962
- Scrancia paucinotata Kiriakoff, 1962
- Scrancia piperita Kiriakoff, 1962
- Scrancia polyphemus Kiriakoff, 1962
- Scrancia pyralina Kiriakoff, 1964
- Scrancia rachitica Kiriakoff, 1962
- Scrancia vaga Kiriakoff, 1962
- Scranciola brunneidorsa Kiriakoff, 1964
- Scranciola livida Kiriakoff, 1962
- Scranciola lunula Kiriakoff, 1964
- Scranciola quadripunctata Gaede, 1928
- Scranciola roseimacula Kiriakoff, 1962
- Scranciola rufula (Hampson, 1910)
- Scranciola straminea Kiriakoff, 1962
- Scranciola unisignata Kiriakoff, 1962
- Sidisca hypochloe Kiriakoff, 1958
- Stauropussa chloe (Holland, 1893)
- Stenostauridia postdiscalis Kiriakoff, 1964
- Subscrancia nigra (Aurivillius, 1904)
- Synete albipunctella Kiriakoff, 1959
- Synete anna Kiriakoff, 1964
- Synete dirki Kiriakoff, 1959
- Synete helgae Kiriakoff, 1959
- Synete vaumaculata Kiriakoff, 1962
- Trabanta gilvescens Kiriakoff, 1962
- Trabanta rufescens Kiriakoff, 1962
- Tricholoba biguttata Berio, 1937
- Tricholoba grisescens (Kiriakoff, 1954)
- Tricholoba intensiva Gaede, 1928
- Tricholoba straminea Kiriakoff, 1960
- Trotonotus castaneus Kiriakoff, 1954
- Ulinella cotytto Kiriakoff, 1954
- Utidaviana citana (Schaus, 1893)
- Xanthodonta debilis Gaede, 1928
- Xanthodonta lusingae Kiriakoff, 1954

== Oecophoridae ==
- Calliphractis gephyropa Meyrick, 1937
- Calliphractis tectulata Meyrick, 1937
- Carcina haematographa Meyrick, 1937

== Plutellidae ==
- Plutella xylostella (Linnaeus, 1758)

== Psychidae ==
- Acanthopsyche carbonarius Karsch, 1900
- Cuphomantis petrosperma Meyrick, 1935
- Eumeta cervina Druce, 1887
- Eumeta rougeoti Bourgogne, 1955
- Melasina hortatrix Meyrick, 1924
- Narycia plana Meyrick, 1919
- Psyche flavicapitella (Romieux, 1937)

== Pterophoridae ==
- Agdistis facetus Bigot, 1969
- Agdistis malitiosa Meyrick, 1909
- Emmelina amseli (Bigot, 1969)
- Exelastis bergeri Bigot, 1969
- Exelastis boireaui Bigot, 1992
- Exelastis pilum Gielis, 2009
- Fletcherella niphadarcha (Meyrick, 1930)
- Hellinsia aethiopicus (Amsel, 1963)
- Hellinsia bengtssoni Gielis, 2009
- Hellinsia katangae Gielis, 2009
- Hellinsia punctata Gielis, 2009
- Inferuncus pentheres (Bigot, 1969)
- Lantanophaga pusillidactylus (Walker, 1864)
- Marasmarcha sisyrodes Meyrick, 1921
- Megalorhipida leptomeres (Meyrick, 1886)
- Ochyrotica africana (Bigot, 1969)
- Oxyptilus erebites Meyrick, 1937
- Paulianilus madecasseus Bigot, 1964
- Picardia ruwenzoricus (Gielis, 1991)
- Platyptilia postbarbata Meyrick, 1938
- Platyptilia rhyncholoba Meyrick, 1924
- Platyptilia romieuxi Gielis, 2009
- Platyptilia rubriacuta Gielis, 2009
- Platyptilia sabius (Felder & Rogenhofer, 1875)
- Platyptilia strictiformis Meyrick, 1932
- Paracapperia esuriens (Meyrick, 1932)
- Pterophorus albidus (Zeller, 1852)
- Pterophorus ceraunia (Bigot, 1969)
- Pterophorus dallastai Gielis, 1991
- Pterophorus lampra (Bigot, 1969)
- Pterophorus rhyparias (Meyrick, 1908)
- Pterophorus spissa (Bigot, 1969)
- Sphenarches anisodactylus (Walker, 1864)
- Sphenarches bifurcatus Gielis, 2009
- Stenodacma cognata Gielis, 2009
- Stenoptilodes taprobanes (Felder & Rogenhofer, 1875)
- Titanoptilus laniger Bigot, 1969
- Xyroptila africana Bigot, 1969

== Pyralidae ==
- Ematheudes straminella Snellen, 1872
- Endotricha ellisoni Whalley, 1963
- Endotricha erythralis Mabille, 1900
- Endotricha rosina Ghesquière, 1942
- Epicrocis stibiella (Snellen, 1872)
- Gymnancyla terminata Meyrick, 1937
- Hypsipyla ereboneura Meyrick, 1939
- Lamoria surrufa Whalley, 1964
- Loryma athalialis (Walker, 1859)
- Stemmatophora flammans Bethune-Baker, 1909

== Saturniidae ==
- Adafroptilum incana (Sonthonnax, 1899)
- Argema kuhnei Pinhey, 1969
- Argema mimosae (Boisduval, 1847)
- Athletes gigas (Sonthonnax, 1902)
- Athletes semialba (Sonthonnax, 1904)
- Aurivillius seydeli Rougeot, 1962
- Bunaea alcinoe (Stoll, 1780)
- Bunaeopsis aurantiaca (Rothschild, 1895)
- Bunaeopsis hersilia (Westwood, 1849)
- Bunaeopsis jacksoni (Jordan, 1908)
- Bunaeopsis licharbas (Maassen & Weymer, 1885)
- Bunaeopsis lueboensis Bouvier, 1931
- Bunaeopsis oubie (Guérin-Méneville, 1849)
- Bunaeopsis princeps (Le Cerf, 1918)
- Campimoptilum kuntzei (Dewitz, 1881)
- Decachorda bouvieri Hering, 1929
- Decachorda fulvia (Druce, 1886)
- Decachorda pomona (Weymer, 1892)
- Decachorda rosea Aurivillius, 1898
- Decachorda seydeli Rougeot, 1970
- Epiphora albidus (Druce, 1886)
- Epiphora bauhiniae (Guérin-Méneville, 1832)
- Epiphora congolana (Bouvier, 1929)
- Epiphora intermedia (Rougeot, 1955)
- Epiphora marginimacula Joicey & Talbot, 1924
- Epiphora obscura Dufrane, 1953
- Epiphora rectifascia Rothschild, 1907
- Eudaemonia trogophylla Hampson, 1919
- Gonimbrasia belina (Westwood, 1849)
- Gonimbrasia congolensis Bouvier, 1927
- Gonimbrasia osiris (Druce, 1896)
- Gonimbrasia rectilineata (Sonthonnax, 1899)
- Gonimbrasia tyrrhea (Cramer, 1775)
- Gonimbrasia wahlbergii (Boisduval, 1847)
- Goodia addita Darge, 2008
- Goodia nodulifera (Karsch, 1892)
- Goodia nubilata Holland, 1893
- Goodia oxytela Jordan, 1922
- Goodia thia Jordan, 1922
- Goodia unguiculata Bouvier, 1936
- Gynanisa ata Strand, 1911
- Heniocha marnois (Rogenhofer, 1891)
- Holocerina agomensis (Karsch, 1896)
- Holocerina angulata (Aurivillius, 1893)
- Holocerina intermedia Rougeot, 1978
- Holocerina smilax (Westwood, 1849)
- Imbrasia allardi Rougeot, 1971
- Imbrasia butyrospermi Vuillot, 1911
- Imbrasia ertli Rebel, 1904
- Imbrasia truncata Aurivillius, 1908
- Lobobunaea acetes (Westwood, 1849)
- Lobobunaea niepelti Strand, 1914
- Lobobunaea phaedusa (Drury, 1782)
- Lobobunaea rosea (Sonthonnax, 1899)
- Ludia orinoptena Karsch, 1892
- Ludia tessmanni Strand, 1911
- Melanocera nereis (Rothschild, 1898)
- Melanocera parva Rothschild, 1907
- Micragone agathylla (Westwood, 1849)
- Micragone allardi Darge, 1990
- Micragone ansorgei (Rothschild, 1907)
- Micragone cana (Aurivillius, 1893)
- Micragone elisabethae Bouvier, 1930
- Nudaurelia alopia Westwood, 1849
- Nudaurelia anthina (Karsch, 1892)
- Nudaurelia anthinoides Rougeot, 1978
- Nudaurelia eblis Strecker, 1876
- Nudaurelia jamesoni (Druce, 1890)
- Nudaurelia macrops Rebel, 1917
- Nudaurelia macrothyris (Rothschild, 1906)
- Nudaurelia nyassana (Rothschild, 1907)
- Nudaurelia rhodina (Rothschild, 1907)
- Nudaurelia staudingeri Aurivillius, 1893
- Nudaurelia wahlbergiana Rougeot, 1972
- Orthogonioptilum adiegetum Karsch, 1892
- Orthogonioptilum adustum Jordan, 1922
- Orthogonioptilum kasaiensis Dufrane, 1953
- Orthogonioptilum kivuensis Bouyer, 1990
- Orthogonioptilum ochraceum Rougeot, 1958
- Orthogonioptilum oremansi Darge, 2008
- Orthogonioptilum prox Karsch, 1892
- Orthogonioptilum vestigiata (Holland, 1893)
- Orthogonioptilum violascens (Rebel, 1914)
- Pselaphelia gemmifera (Butler, 1878)
- Pselaphelia oremansi Darge, 2008
- Pselaphelia vandenberghei Bouyer, 1992
- Pseudantheraea discrepans (Butler, 1878)
- Pseudantheraea imperator Rougeot, 1962
- Pseudaphelia apollinaris (Boisduval, 1847)
- Pseudaphelia luteola Bouvier, 1930
- Pseudaphelia simplex Rebel, 1906
- Pseudimbrasia deyrollei (J. Thomson, 1858)
- Pseudobunaea callista (Jordan, 1910)
- Pseudobunaea cleopatra (Aurivillius, 1893)
- Rohaniella pygmaea (Maassen & Weymer, 1885)
- Tagoropsis flavinata (Walker, 1865)
- Tagoropsis hanningtoni (Butler, 1883)
- Tagoropsis lupina Rothschild, 1907
- Tagoropsis rougeoti D. S. Fletcher, 1952
- Ubaena fuelleborniana Karsch, 1900
- Urota centralis Bouyer, 2008
- Urota herbuloti Darge, 1975
- Urota sinope (Westwood, 1849)

== Schistonoeidae ==
- Oecia oecophila (Staudinger, 1876)

== Sesiidae ==
- Chamaesphecia clathrata Le Cerf, 1917
- Chamanthedon fulvipes (Hampson, 1910)
- Episannina perlucida (Le Cerf, 1911)
- Melittia chalconota Hampson, 1910
- Melittia hyaloxantha Meyrick, 1928
- Paranthrene lodimana (Strand, 1918)
- Synanthedon cyanescens (Hampson, 1910)

== Sphingidae ==
- Acanthosphinx guessfeldti (Dewitz, 1879)
- Acherontia atropos (Linnaeus, 1758)
- Afroclanis calcareus (Rothschild & Jordan, 1907)
- Afrosataspes galleyi (Basquin, 1982)
- Afrosphinx amabilis (Jordan, 1911)
- Agrius convolvuli (Linnaeus, 1758)
- Antinephele muscosa Holland, 1889
- Avinoffia hollandi (Clark, 1917)
- Basiothia medea (Fabricius, 1781)
- Basiothia schenki (Möschler, 1872)
- Cephonodes hylas (Linnaeus, 1771)
- Chloroclanis virescens (Butler, 1882)
- Daphnis nerii (Linnaeus, 1758)
- Euchloron megaera (Linnaeus, 1758)
- Falcatula falcata (Rothschild & Jordan, 1903)
- Grillotius bergeri (Darge, 1973)
- Hippotion balsaminae (Walker, 1856)
- Hippotion celerio (Linnaeus, 1758)
- Hippotion eson (Cramer, 1779)
- Hippotion gracilis (Butler, 1875)
- Hippotion irregularis (Walker, 1856)
- Hippotion osiris (Dalman, 1823)
- Leptoclanis pulchra Rothschild & Jordan, 1903
- Leucophlebia afra Karsch, 1891
- Lycosphingia hamatus (Dewitz, 1879)
- Macroglossum trochilus (Hübner, 1823)
- Neopolyptychus consimilis (Rothschild & Jordan, 1903)
- Neopolyptychus convexus (Rothschild & Jordan, 1903)
- Neopolyptychus pygarga (Karsch, 1891)
- Neopolyptychus serrator (Jordan, 1929)
- Nephele accentifera (Palisot de Beauvois, 1821)
- Nephele bipartita Butler, 1878
- Nephele discifera Karsch, 1891
- Nephele peneus (Cramer, 1776)
- Phylloxiphia bicolor (Rothschild, 1894)
- Phylloxiphia goodii (Holland, 1889)
- Phylloxiphia illustris (Rothschild & Jordan, 1906)
- Phylloxiphia karschi (Rothschild & Jordan, 1903)
- Phylloxiphia metria (Jordan, 1920)
- Phylloxiphia oberthueri (Rothschild & Jordan, 1903)
- Phylloxiphia oweni (Carcasson, 1968)
- Phylloxiphia punctum (Rothschild, 1907)
- Phylloxiphia vicina (Rothschild & Jordan, 1915)
- Platysphinx constrigilis (Walker, 1869)
- Platysphinx stigmatica (Mabille, 1878)
- Polyptychoides digitatus (Karsch, 1891)
- Polyptychoides grayii (Walker, 1856)
- Polyptychopsis marshalli (Rothschild & Jordan, 1903)
- Polyptychus affinis Rothschild & Jordan, 1903
- Polyptychus andosa Walker, 1856
- Polyptychus anochus Rothschild & Jordan, 1906
- Polyptychus aurora Clark, 1936
- Polyptychus barnsi Clark, 1926
- Polyptychus bernardii Rougeot, 1966
- Polyptychus carteri (Butler, 1882)
- Polyptychus coryndoni Rothschild & Jordan, 1903
- Polyptychus enodia (Holland, 1889)
- Polyptychus hollandi Rothschild & Jordan, 1903
- Polyptychus murinus Rothschild, 1904
- Polyptychus nigriplaga Rothschild & Jordan, 1903
- Polyptychus orthographus Rothschild & Jordan, 1903
- Praedora plagiata Rothschild & Jordan, 1903
- Pseudoclanis evestigata Kernbach, 1955
- Pseudoclanis molitor (Rothschild & Jordan, 1912)
- Pseudoclanis occidentalis Rothschild & Jordan, 1903
- Rhodafra marshalli Rothschild & Jordan, 1903
- Rufoclanis numosae (Wallengren, 1860)
- Temnora angulosa Rothschild & Jordan, 1906
- Temnora elegans (Rothschild, 1895)
- Temnora elisabethae Hering, 1930
- Temnora eranga (Holland, 1889)
- Temnora griseata Rothschild & Jordan, 1903
- Temnora iapygoides (Holland, 1889)
- Temnora pseudopylas (Rothschild, 1894)
- Temnora radiata (Karsch, 1892)
- Temnora reutlingeri (Holland, 1889)
- Temnora sardanus (Walker, 1856)
- Temnora spiritus (Holland, 1893)
- Temnora wollastoni Rothschild & Jordan, 1908
- Theretra capensis (Linnaeus, 1764)

== Thyrididae ==
- Arniocera cyanoxantha (Mabille, 1893)
- Arniocera elliptica Kiriakoff, 1954
- Arniocera erythropyga (Wallengren, 1860)
- Arniocera inornata Kiriakoff, 1954
- Arniocera rectifascia Kiriakoff, 1954
- Arniocera vanstraeleni Kiriakoff, 1954
- Arniocera viridifasciata (Aurivillius, 1900)
- Arniocera zambesina (Walker, 1866)
- Byblisia latipes Walker, 1865
- Byblisia micans Kiriakoff, 1954
- Byblisia setipes (Plötz, 1880)
- Cecidothyris longicorpa Whalley, 1971
- Chrysotypus medjensis (Holland, 1920)
- Dysodia magnifica Whalley, 1968
- Epaena radiata (Warren, 1908)
- Epaena vocata Whalley, 1971
- Gnathodes fiscinella Whalley, 1971
- Marmax hyparchus (Cramer, 1779)
- Marmax semiaurata (Walker, 1854)
- Marmax vicaria (Walker, 1854)
- Nakawa fuscibasis (Hampson, 1906)
- Netrocera euxantha Hering, 1929
- Netrocera jordani Joicey & Talbot, 1921
- Netrocera overlaeti Talbot, 1928
- Netrocera satanas Hering, 1931
- Netrocera seydeli Hering, 1931
- Ninia magnifica Alberti, 1957
- Ninia plumipes (Drury, 1782)
- Ninia saphira Aurivillius, 1900
- Trichobaptes auristrigata (Plötz, 1880)

== Tineidae ==
- Acridotarsa melipecta (Meyrick, 1915)
- Afrocelestis evertata Gozmány, 1965
- Argyrocorys niphorrhabda Meyrick, 1938
- Catazetema trivialis Gozmány, 1976
- Ceratophaga chalcodryas (Meyrick, 1938)
- Ceratophaga ethadopa (Meyrick, 1938)
- Ceratophaga vastellus (Zeller, 1852)
- Cimitra estimata (Gozmány, 1965)
- Cimitra fetialis (Meyrick, 1917)
- Cimitra horridella (Walker, 1863)
- Cimitra platyloxa (Meyrick, 1930)
- Cimitra texturata (Gozmány, 1967)
- Criticonoma crassa Gozmány & Vári, 1973
- Criticonoma episcardina (Gozmány, 1965)
- Crobylophanes sericophaea Meyrick, 1938
- Crypsithyris auriala (Gozmány, 1967)
- Cubitofusa pseudoglebata (Gozmány, 1967)
- Cubitofusa seydeli (Gozmány, 1967)
- Dasyses archipis Gozmány, 1967
- Dasyses centralis Gozmány, 1967
- Dasyses colorata Gozmány, 1967
- Dasyses dinoptera Gozmány, 1967
- Dasyses rugosella (Stainton, 1859)
- Dasyses thanatis Gozmány, 1967
- Drosica abjectella Walker, 1963
- Ectabola extans Gozmány, 1976
- Ectabola laxata (Gozmány, 1967)
- Ectabola perversa (Gozmány, 1967)
- Edosa effulgens (Gozmány, 1965)
- Endeixis exalata Gozmány, 1976
- Erechthias amphibaphes (Meyrick, 1939)
- Exoplisis monopis Gozmány, 1976
- Hapsifera equatorialis Gozmány, 1967
- Hapsifera glebata Meyrick, 1908
- Hapsifera haplotherma Meyrick, 1934
- Hapsifera ignobilis Meyrick, 1919
- Hapsifera lithocentra Meyrick, 1920
- Hapsifera lutea Gozmány, 1967
- Hapsifera nidicola Meyrick, 1935
- Hapsifera refalcata Gozmány, 1967
- Hapsifera revoluta Meyrick, 1914
- Heterostasis extricata Gozmány, 1965
- Hyperbola zicsii Gozmány, 1965
- Machaeropteris baloghi Gozmány, 1965
- Machaeropteris ochroptera Gozmány, 1967
- Monopis altivagans Meyrick, 1938
- Monopis immaculata Gozmány, 1967
- Monopis malescripta Meyrick, 1938
- Monopis megalodelta Meyrick, 1908
- Monopis meyricki Gozmány, 1967
- Monopis oriphylax Meyrick, 1924
- Monopis rejectella (Walker, 1864)
- Monopis rutilicostella (Stainton, 1860)
- Monopis speculella (Zeller, 1852)
- Morophaga soror Gozmány, 1965
- Organodesma arsiptila (Meyrick, 1931)
- Organodesma aurocrata Gozmány, 1976
- Organodesma optata Gozmány, 1967
- Organodesma petaloxantha (Meyrick, 1931)
- Organodesma psapharogma (Meyrick, 1936)
- Organodesma simplex Gozmány, 1967
- Pachypsaltis meyricki Gozmány & Vári, 1973
- Pachypsaltis pachystoma (Meyrick, 1920)
- Pelecystola polysticha (Meyrick, 1938)
- Perissomastix bergeri Gozmány, 1967
- Perissomastix breviberbis (Meyrick, 1933)
- Perissomastix dentifera Gozmány & Vári, 1973
- Perissomastix fulvicoma (Meyrick, 1921)
- Perissomastix gabori Gozmány, 1967
- Perissomastix lala Gozmány, 1967
- Perissomastix melanops Gozmány, 1967
- Perissomastix mili Gozmány, 1965
- Perissomastix perlata Gozmány, 1967
- Perissomastix protaxia (Meyrick, 1924)
- Perissomastix pyroxantha (Meyrick, 1914)
- Perissomastix titanea Gozmány, 1967
- Phereoeca postulata Gozmány, 1967
- Phthoropoea oenochares (Meyrick, 1920)
- Pitharcha chalinaea Meyrick, 1908
- Pitharcha fasciata (Ghesquière, 1940)
- Randominta meretrix Gozmány, 1976
- Scalmatica zernyi Gozmány, 1967
- Setomorpha rutella Zeller, 1852
- Silosca licziae Gozmány, 1967
- Silosca somnis Gozmány, 1967
- Silosca superba Gozmány, 1967
- Sphallestasis besucheti Gozmány, 1976
- Sphallestasis decipiens (Gozmány, 1967)
- Sphallestasis epiforma (Gozmány, 1967)
- Sphallestasis magnifica (Gozmány, 1967)
- Sphallestasis oenopis (Meyrick, 1908)
- Sphallestasis romieuxi Gozmány, 1976
- Tinea translucens Meyrick, 1917
- Tineola anaphecola Gozmány, 1967
- Tiquadra cultrifera Meyrick, 1914
- Tiquadra ghesquierei Gozmány, 1967
- Tiquadra goochii Walsingham, 1881
- Tiquadra ochreata Gozmány, 1967
- Trichophaga mormopis Meyrick, 1935
- Zygosignata scutigera (Gozmány, 1967)

== Tischeriidae ==
- Tischeria urticicolella (Ghesquière, 1940)

== Tortricidae ==
- Accra canthararcha (Meyrick, 1937)
- Accra rubicunda Razowski, 1966
- Accra witteae Razowski, 1964
- Acleris ruwenzorica Razowski, 2005
- Afroploce ealana Aarvik, 2004
- Afroploce karsholti Aarvik, 2004
- Agapeta heliochrosta (Meyrick, 1928)
- Agapeta limenias (Meyrick, 1928)
- Anthozela anonidii Ghesquière, 1940
- Apotoforma mayumbeana Razowski, 2012
- Brachioxena sparactis (Meyrick, 1928)
- Bubonoxena ephippias (Meyrick, 1907)
- Capua liparochra Meyrick, 1928
- Capua pylora Meyrick, 1938
- Clepsis brachyptycta (Meyrick, 1938)
- Clepsis enochlodes (Meyrick, 1938)
- Clepsis scaeodoxa (Meyrick, 1935)
- Congoprinsia juratae Razowski, 2012
- Cornesia ormoperla Razowski, 1981
- Cornips dryocausta (Meyrick, 1938)
- Cornips gravidspinatus Razowski, 2010
- Cosmorrhyncha acrocosma (Meyrick, 1908)
- Cosmorrhyncha microcosma Aarvik, 2004
- Crocidosema plebejana Zeller, 1847
- Cryptophlebia peltastica (Meyrick, 1921)
- Cydia improbana (Snellen, 1872)
- Eccopsis incultana (Walker, 1863)
- Eccopsis nebulana Walsingham, 1891
- Eccopsis praecedens Walsingham, 1897
- Eccopsis wahlbergiana Zeller, 1852
- Enarmoniodes mirabilis Ghesquière, 1940
- Endothenia euryteles (Meyrick, 1936)
- Endothenia vasculigera Meyrick, 1938
- Epichoristodes imbriculata Meyrick, 1938
- Epichoristodes pylora (Meyrick, 1938)
- Eucosma cathareutis (Meyrick, 1938)
- Eucosma phaeochyta Bradley, 1965
- Eucosma rigens Meyrick, 1938
- Eucosma transmutata Meyrick, 1931
- Eucosmocydia mixographa (Meyrick, 1939)
- Eugnosta chalasma Razowski, 1993
- Eugnosta percnoptila (Meyrick, 1933)
- Geita bjoernstadi Aarvik, 2004
- Grapholita gypsothicta (Meyrick, 1938)
- Idiothauma rigatiella (Ghesquière, 1940)
- Ioditis capnobactra Meyrick, 1938
- Lozotaenia cyanombra (Meyrick, 1935)
- Lozotaenia manticopa (Meyrick, 1934)
- Lozotaenia myriosema (Meyrick, 1936)
- Lumaria petrophora (Meyrick, 1938)
- Meridemis hylaeana (Ghesquière, 1940)
- Metamesia elegans (Walsingham, 1881)
- Neorrhyncha congolana Aarvik, 2004
- Nepheloploce nephelopyrga (Meyrick, 1938)
- Olethreutes percnochlaena (Meyrick, 1938)
- Recaraceria hormoterma (Meyrick, 1938)
- Rubidograptis praeconia (Meyrick, 1937)
- Rutilograptis couteauxi (Ghesquière, 1940)
- Sanguinograptis albardana (Snellen, 1872)
- Strepsicrates rhothia (Meyrick, 1910)
- Sycacantha nereidopa (Meyrick, 1927)
- Sycacantha orphnogenes (Meyrick, 1939)
- Sycacantha regionalis (Meyrick, 1934)
- Tetramoera isogramma (Meyrick, 1908)
- Thylacogaster monospora (Meyrick, 1939)
- Tortrix triadelpha Meyrick, 1920
- Xeneboda congo Razowski, 2012
- Xeneboda mayumbea Razowski, 2012

== Uraniidae ==
- Acropteris hypocrita Snellen, 1872
- Acropteris mendax Snellen, 1872
- Acropteris tenella (Walker, ????)
- Aploschema albaria (Plötz, 1880)
- Dissoprumna erycinaria (Guenée, 1857)

== Zygaenidae ==
- Aethioprocris congoensis Alberti, 1957
- Alteramenelikia jordani (Alberti, 1954)
- Astyloneura difformis (Jordan, 1907)
- Astyloneura esmeralda (Hampson, 1920)
- Astyloneura gaedei Alberti, 1957
- Astyloneura incerta Alberti, 1957
- Astyloneura meridionalis (Hampson, 1920)
- Astyloneura monotona Hering, 1931
- Astyloneura nitens Jordan, 1907
- Chalconycles chloauges (Holland, 1893)
- Epiorna abessynica (Koch, 1865)
- Epiorna ochreipennis (Butler, 1874)
- Saliunca cyanea Hampson, 1920
- Saliunca flavifrons (Plötz, 1880)
- Saliunca meruana Aurivillius, 1910
- Saliunca mimetica Jordan, 1907
- Saliunca orphnina Hering, 1931
- Saliunca pallida Alberti, 1957
- Saliunca styx (Fabricius, 1775)
- Saliunca ventralis Jordan, 1907
- Saliunca vidua Rebel, 1914
- Syringura pulchra (Butler, 1876)
- Syringura triplex (Plötz, 1880)
- Tascia instructa (Walker, 1854)
- Xenoprocris jordani Romieux, 1937
- Zutulba namaqua (Boisduval, 1847)
