= Neorrhyncha =

Scientific classification
- Kingdom: Animalia
- Phylum: Arthropoda
- Class: Insecta
- Order: Lepidoptera
- Family: Tortricidae
- Tribe: Olethreutini
- Genus: Neorrhyncha; Aarvik, 2004

Genus of tortrix moths

Neorrhyncha is a genus of moths belonging to the subfamily Olethreutinae of the family Tortricidae.

== Species ==
- Neorrhyncha angina Razowski & Wojtusiak, 2012
- Neorrhyncha bendelana Razowski & Wojtusial, 2012
- Neorrhyncha camerunica Aarvik, 2004
- Neorrhyncha congolana Aarvik, 2004
- Neorrhyncha gestroa Razowski & Wojtusial, 2012

== See also ==
- List of Tortricidae genera
