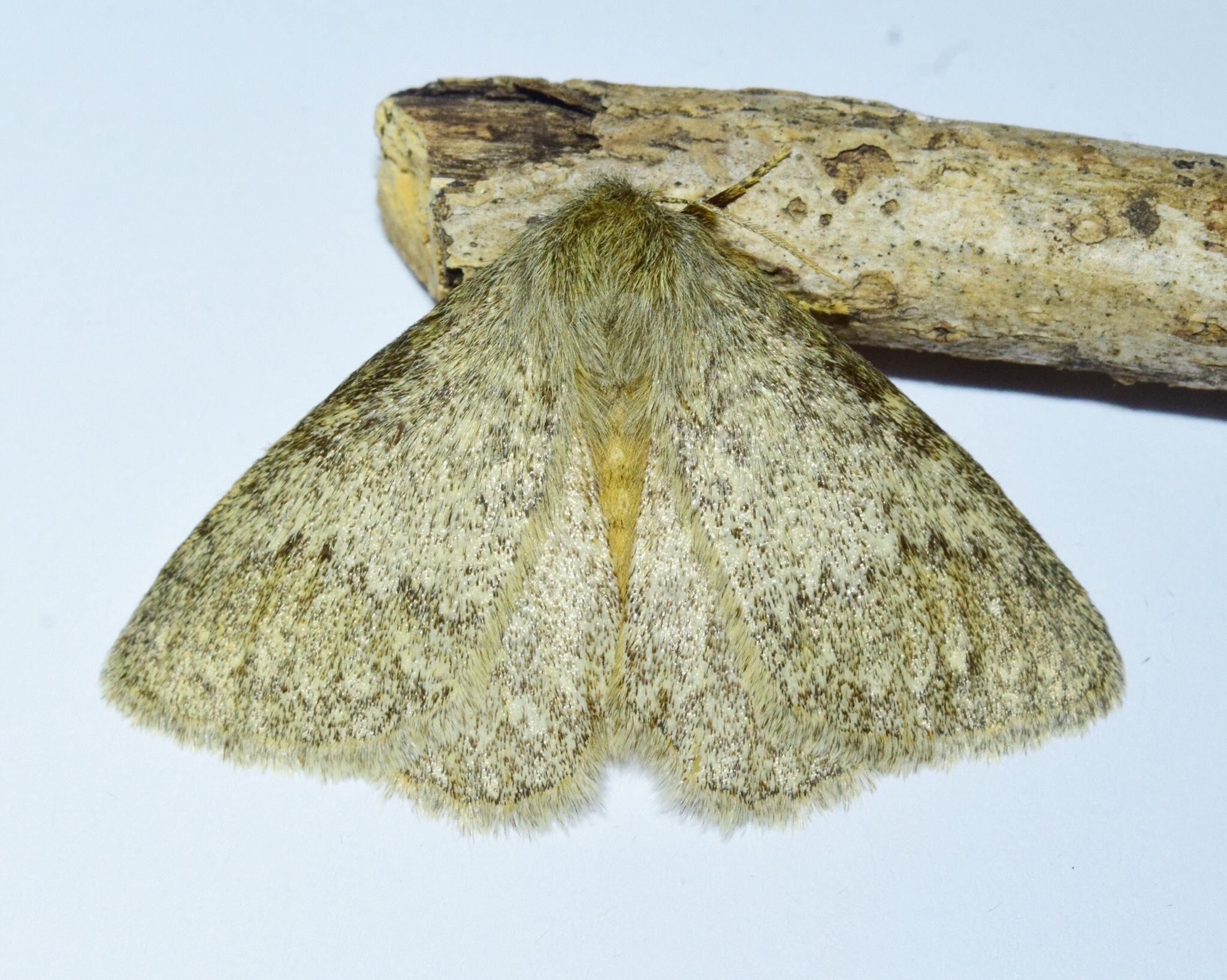

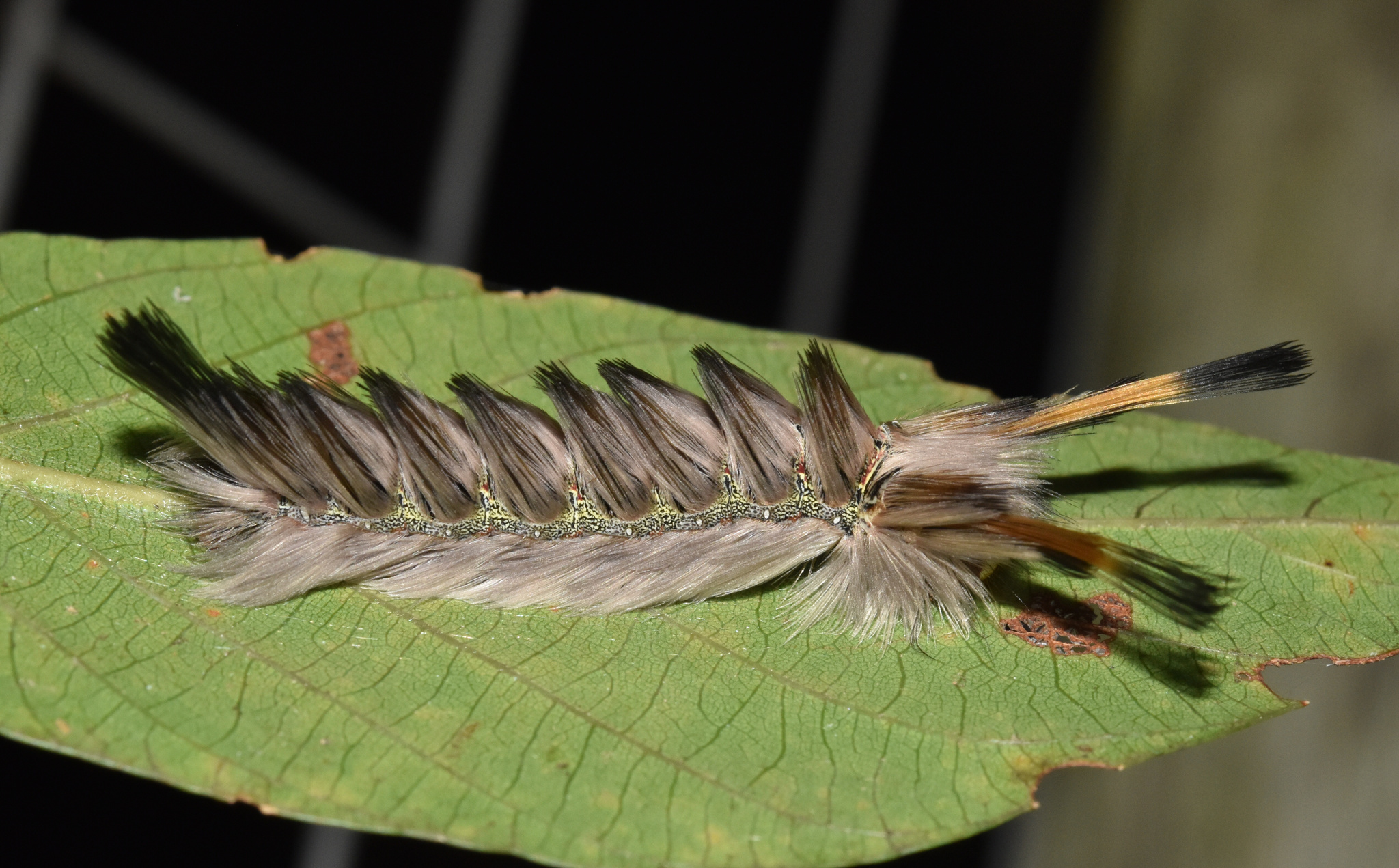
- Adult (top), larva (bottom)

Scientific classification
- Kingdom: Animalia
- Phylum: Arthropoda
- Class: Insecta
- Order: Lepidoptera
- Family: Eupterotidae
- Genus: Lichenopteryx
- Species: L. despecta

Binomial name
- Lichenopteryx despecta C. Felder & R. Felder, 1874

= Lichenopteryx despecta =

Despised monkey

Species of moth

Lichenopteryx despecta, the despised monkey, is a moth in the family Eupterotidae. It was described by father and son entomologists Cajetan and Rudolf Felder in 1874. It is found in KwaZulu-Natal in South Africa and Zanzibar in Tanzania.
