= Lichenopteryx =

Scientific classification
- Kingdom: Animalia
- Phylum: Arthropoda
- Class: Insecta
- Order: Lepidoptera
- Family: Eupterotidae
- Subfamily: Eupterotinae
- Genus: Lichenopteryx; Felder, 1874

Synonyms
- Lechenopteryx Druce, 1886

Genus of moths

Lichenopteryx is a genus of moths in the family Eupterotidae.

== Species ==
- Lichenopteryx despecta Felder, 1874
- Lichenopteryx scotina Hering, 1932
