= Afrosymmoca =

Scientific classification
- Kingdom: Animalia
- Phylum: Arthropoda
- Clade: Pancrustacea
- Class: Insecta
- Order: Lepidoptera
- Family: Autostichidae
- Subfamily: Symmocinae
- Genus: Afrosymmoca; Gozmány, 1966

Genus of insects

Afrosymmoca is a moth genus in the family Autostichidae.

== Species ==
- Afrosymmoca seydeli Gozmány, 1966
- Afrosymmoca straminea Gozmány, 1966
