= Randominta =

Scientific classification
- Kingdom: Animalia
- Phylum: Arthropoda
- Clade: Pancrustacea
- Class: Insecta
- Order: Lepidoptera
- Family: Tineidae
- Genus: Randominta; Gozmány, 1976
- Species: R. meretrix

Binomial name
- Randominta meretrix Gozmány, 1976

Genus of moths

Randominta is a genus of moths belonging to the family Tineidae. It contains only one species, Randominta meretrix, which is found in the Democratic Republic of the Congo.
