= Neorrhyncha congolana =

Scientific classification
- Kingdom: Animalia
- Phylum: Arthropoda
- Clade: Pancrustacea
- Class: Insecta
- Order: Lepidoptera
- Family: Tortricidae
- Genus: Neorrhyncha
- Species: N. congolana

Binomial name
- Neorrhyncha congolana Aarvik, 2004

Species of moth

Neorrhyncha congolana is a species of moth of the family Tortricidae. It is found in the Democratic Republic of the Congo.
