= Endeixis =

Scientific classification
- Kingdom: Animalia
- Phylum: Arthropoda
- Clade: Pancrustacea
- Class: Insecta
- Order: Lepidoptera
- Family: Tineidae
- Genus: Endeixis; Gozmány, 1976
- Species: E. exalata

Binomial name
- Endeixis exalata Gozmány, 1976

Genus of moths

Endeixis is a genus of moths belonging to the family Tineidae. It contains only one species, Endeixis exalata, which is found in the Democratic Republic of the Congo.
