= Scopula stephanitis =

Scientific classification
- Kingdom: Animalia
- Phylum: Arthropoda
- Class: Insecta
- Order: Lepidoptera
- Family: Geometridae
- Genus: Scopula
- Species: S. stephanitis

Binomial name
- Scopula stephanitis Prout, 1932

Species of geometer moth in subfamily Sterrhinae

Scopula stephanitis is a moth of the family Geometridae. It is found in the Democratic Republic of Congo, Rwanda and Uganda.
