= Heterostasis =

Scientific classification
- Kingdom: Animalia
- Phylum: Arthropoda
- Clade: Pancrustacea
- Class: Insecta
- Order: Lepidoptera
- Family: Tineidae
- Subfamily: Myrmecozelinae
- Genus: Heterostasis; Gozmány, 1965
- Species: H. extricata

Binomial name
- Heterostasis extricata Gozmány, 1965

Genus of moths

Heterostasis is a moth genus, belonging to the family Tineidae. It contains only one species, Heterostasis extricata, which is found in the Democratic Republic of the Congo.
