= Coleophora bantuella =

Scientific classification
- Kingdom: Animalia
- Phylum: Arthropoda
- Clade: Pancrustacea
- Class: Insecta
- Order: Lepidoptera
- Family: Coleophoridae
- Genus: Coleophora
- Species: C. bantuella

Binomial name
- Coleophora bantuella Baldizzone & van der Wolf, 2005

Species of moth

Coleophora bantuella is a moth of the family Coleophoridae. It is found in the Democratic Republic of Congo.
