= Anaphe etiennei =

Scientific classification
- Domain: Eukaryota
- Kingdom: Animalia
- Phylum: Arthropoda
- Class: Insecta
- Order: Lepidoptera
- Superfamily: Noctuoidea
- Family: Notodontidae
- Genus: Anaphe
- Species: A. etiennei

Binomial name
- Anaphe etiennei Schouteden, 1912

Synonyms
- Anaphe venata var. etiennei Schouteden, 1912; Anaphe perobscura Berio, 1937

Species of moth

Anaphe etiennei is a moth of the family Notodontidae. It was described by Henri Schouteden in 1912. It is found in Cameroon, the Democratic Republic of the Congo and Ivory Coast.
