= Coleophora fragilella =

Scientific classification
- Kingdom: Animalia
- Phylum: Arthropoda
- Clade: Pancrustacea
- Class: Insecta
- Order: Lepidoptera
- Family: Coleophoridae
- Genus: Coleophora
- Species: C. fragilella

Binomial name
- Coleophora fragilella Baldizzone & van der Wolf, 2005

Species of moth

Coleophora fragilella is a moth of the family Coleophoridae. It is found in the Democratic Republic of Congo.

Description: Wingspan 11.5 to 14.5 mm. In certain lights this species shows the same brassy metallic look as other family members.

In common with its close relative it inhabits grassy areas where the food plant, clover (Trifolium sp.), is abundant. The larvae feed on the seeds from within a cryptic case.
