= Dichomeris opalina =

Scientific classification
- Kingdom: Animalia
- Phylum: Arthropoda
- Class: Insecta
- Order: Lepidoptera
- Family: Gelechiidae
- Genus: Dichomeris
- Species: D. opalina

Binomial name
- Dichomeris opalina (Ghesquière, 1940)

Synonyms
- Prasodryas opalina Ghesquière, 1940

Species of moth

Dichomeris opalina is a moth in the family Gelechiidae. It was described by Jean Ghesquière in 1940. It is found in the former Équateur province of the Democratic Republic of the Congo.
