= Coleophora tetrodonta =

Scientific classification
- Kingdom: Animalia
- Phylum: Arthropoda
- Clade: Pancrustacea
- Class: Insecta
- Order: Lepidoptera
- Family: Coleophoridae
- Genus: Coleophora
- Species: C. tetrodonta

Binomial name
- Coleophora tetrodonta Baldizzone & van der Wolf, 2005

Species of moth

Coleophora tetrodonta is a moth of the family Coleophoridae. It is found in the Democratic Republic of Congo.
