= Argyrocorys =

Scientific classification
- Kingdom: Animalia
- Phylum: Arthropoda
- Clade: Pancrustacea
- Class: Insecta
- Order: Lepidoptera
- Family: Tineidae
- Genus: Argyrocorys; Meyrick, 1938
- Species: A. niphorrhabda

Binomial name
- Argyrocorys niphorrhabda Meyrick, 1938

Synonyms
- Lathrotinea Gozmány & Vári, 1973

Genus of moths

Argyrocorys is a genus of moths belonging to the family Tineidae. It contains only one species, Argyrocorys niphorrhabda, which is found in the Democratic Republic of the Congo.
