= Argyroploce percnochlaena =

"Argyroploce" percnochlaena

Scientific classification
- Kingdom: Animalia
- Phylum: Arthropoda
- Clade: Pancrustacea
- Class: Insecta
- Order: Lepidoptera
- Family: Tortricidae
- Subfamily: Olethreutinae
- Tribe: Olethreutini
- Genus: incertae sedis
- Species: "A." percnochlaena

Binomial name
- "Argyroploce" percnochlaena Meyrick, 1938

Synonyms
- Olethreutes percnochlaena

Species of moth

"Argyroploce" percnochlaena is a species of moth of the family Tortricidae. It is found in the Democratic Republic of Congo.
