= Epichoristodes pylora =

Scientific classification
- Kingdom: Animalia
- Phylum: Arthropoda
- Clade: Pancrustacea
- Class: Insecta
- Order: Lepidoptera
- Family: Tortricidae
- Genus: Epichoristodes
- Species: E. pylora

Binomial name
- Epichoristodes pylora (Meyrick, 1938)

Synonyms
- Capua pylora Meyrick, 1938

Species of moth

Epichoristodes pylora is a species of moth of the family Tortricidae. It is found in the Democratic Republic of Congo.
