= Afrosymmoca seydeli =

Scientific classification
- Kingdom: Animalia
- Phylum: Arthropoda
- Clade: Pancrustacea
- Class: Insecta
- Order: Lepidoptera
- Family: Autostichidae
- Genus: Afrosymmoca
- Species: A. seydeli

Binomial name
- Afrosymmoca seydeli Gozmány, 1966

Species of moth

Afrosymmoca seydeli is a moth in the family Autostichidae. It was described by László Anthony Gozmány in 1966. It is found in the area of what was Katanga Province in the Democratic Republic of the Congo.
