= Coleophora crossanthes =

Scientific classification
- Kingdom: Animalia
- Phylum: Arthropoda
- Class: Insecta
- Order: Lepidoptera
- Family: Coleophoridae
- Genus: Coleophora
- Species: C. crossanthes

Binomial name
- Coleophora crossanthes Meyrick, 1938

Species of moth

Coleophora crossanthes is a moth of the family Coleophoridae that is endemic to the Democratic Republic of the Congo.
