= Scopula coniargyris =

Scientific classification
- Kingdom: Animalia
- Phylum: Arthropoda
- Class: Insecta
- Order: Lepidoptera
- Family: Geometridae
- Genus: Scopula
- Species: S. coniargyris

Binomial name
- Scopula coniargyris Prout, 1932

Species of geometer moth in subfamily Sterrhinae

Scopula coniargyris is a moth of the family Geometridae. It was described by Prout in 1932. It is found in Katanga province of the Democratic Republic of the Congo.
