= Lichenopteryx scotina =

Scientific classification
- Kingdom: Animalia
- Phylum: Arthropoda
- Class: Insecta
- Order: Lepidoptera
- Family: Eupterotidae
- Genus: Lichenopteryx
- Species: L. scotina

Binomial name
- Lichenopteryx scotina Hering, 1932

Species of moth

Lichenopteryx scotina is a moth in the family Eupterotidae. It was described by Hering in 1932. It is found in the Democratic Republic of Congo (Katanga).
