= Afrasura rivulosa =

Scientific classification
- Kingdom: Animalia
- Phylum: Arthropoda
- Class: Insecta
- Order: Lepidoptera
- Superfamily: Noctuoidea
- Family: Erebidae
- Subfamily: Arctiinae
- Genus: Afrasura
- Species: A. rivulosa

Binomial name
- Afrasura rivulosa (Walker, 1854)

Synonyms
- Siccia rivulosa Walker, 1854; Asura rivulosa; Asura fulvia Hampson, 1900; Asura obsolescens Hampson, 1914; Asura obsolescens subfulvia Kiriakoff, 1954

Species of moth

Afrasura rivulosa is a moth of the subfamily Arctiinae first described by Francis Walker in 1854. It is found in the Democratic Republic of the Congo, Ethiopia, Kenya, Nigeria, South Africa and Uganda.

== Subspecies ==
- Afrasura rivulosa rivulosa
- Afrasura rivulosa ethiopica Durante, 2009 (Ethiopia)
