= Hoplojana =

Scientific classification
- Kingdom: Animalia
- Phylum: Arthropoda
- Class: Insecta
- Order: Lepidoptera
- Family: Eupterotidae
- Subfamily: Janinae
- Genus: Hoplojana; Aurivillius, 1901

Synonyms
- Haplojana Rothschild, 1917

Genus of moths

Hoplojana is a genus of moths in the family Eupterotidae.

== Species ==
- Hoplojana indecisa Aurivillius, 1901
- Hoplojana politzari Basquin, 2013
- Hoplojana purpurata Wichgraf, 1921
- Hoplojana watsoni (Berger, 1980)
- Hoplojana zernyi Gschwandner, 1923

== Former species ==
- Hoplojana abyssinica Rothschild, 1917
- Hoplojana anaemica Hampson, 1910
- Hoplojana distincta Rothschild, 1917
- Hoplojana insignifica Rothschild, 1917
- Hoplojana nigrorufa Berger, 1980
- Hoplojana overlaeti Berger, 1980
- Hoplojana rhodoptera Gerstaecker, 1871
- Hoplojana roseobrunnea Rothschild, 1917
- Hoplojana rustica Strand, 1911
- Hoplojana soricis Rothschild, 1917
- Hoplojana tripunctata Aurivillius, 1897
