= List of moths of Burundi =

Location of Burundi

There are about 118 known moth species of Burundi. The moths (mostly nocturnal) and butterflies (mostly diurnal) together make up the taxonomic order Lepidoptera.

This is a list of moth species which have been recorded in Burundi.

== Arctiidae ==
- Amata alicia (Butler, 1876)
- Apisa subargentea Joicey & Talbot, 1921
- Asura gigantea Kühne, 2007
- Asura mutabilis Kühne, 2007
- Balacra compsa (Jordan, 1904)
- Balacra rattrayi (Rothschild, 1910)
- Balacra rubrostriata (Aurivillius, 1892)
- Cragia adiastola (Kiriakoff, 1958)
- Creatonotos leucanioides Holland, 1893
- Metarctia flavicincta Aurivillius, 1900
- Metarctia lateritia Herrich-Schäffer, 1855
- Nyctemera itokina (Aurivillius, 1904)
- Pseudothyretes kamitugensis (Dufrane, 1945)
- Utetheisa pulchella (Linnaeus, 1758)

== Crambidae ==
- Diasemia lunalis Gaede, 1916
- Orphanostigma excisa (Martin, 1956)
- Psara cryptolepis (Martin, 1956)
- Udea ferrugalis (Hübner, 1796)

== Eupterotidae ==
- Jana fletcheri Berger, 1980
- Jana roseata Rothschild, 1917
- Janomima dannfelti (Aurivillius, 1893)
- Stenoglene obtusus (Walker, 1864)
- Stenoglene roseus (Druce, 1886)

== Geometridae ==
- Cleora pavlitzkiae (D. S. Fletcher, 1958)
- Cleora rostella D. S. Fletcher, 1967
- Idiodes flexilinea (Warren, 1898)
- Idiodes pectinata (Herbulot, 1966)
- Pingasa distensaria (Walker, 1860)
- Zamarada acosmeta Prout, 1921
- Zamarada amicta Prout, 1915
- Zamarada bathyscaphes Prout, 1912
- Zamarada delta D. S. Fletcher, 1974
- Zamarada gamma D. S. Fletcher, 1958
- Zamarada glareosa Bastelberger, 1909
- Zamarada metrioscaphes Prout, 1912
- Zamarada plana Bastelberger, 1909
- Zamarada prolata D. S. Fletcher, 1974
- Zamarada seydeli D. S. Fletcher, 1974

== Lasiocampidae ==
- Braura elgonensis (Kruck, 1940)
- Braura ligniclusa (Walker, 1865)
- Eutricha morosa (Walker, 1865)
- Metajana marshalli Aurivillius, 1909
- Morongea lampara Zolotuhin & Prozorov, 2010
- Odontocheilopteryx myxa Wallengren, 1860
- Odontocheilopteryx phoneus Hering, 1928
- Odontocheilopteryx scilla Gurkovich & Zolotuhin, 2009
- Pachyna subfascia (Walker, 1855)
- Pachytrina papyroides (Tams, 1936)
- Pallastica meloui (Riel, 1909)
- Pallastica pallens (Bethune-Baker, 1908)
- Pallastica sericeofasciata (Aurivillius, 1921)
- Stenophatna rothschildi (Tams, 1936)

== Lymantriidae ==
- Batella katanga (Collenette, 1938)
- Cropera testacea Walker, 1855
- Crorema fuscinotata (Hampson, 1910)
- Dasychira lulua Collenette, 1937
- Dasychira punctifera (Walker, 1857)
- Eudasychira georgiana (Fawcett, 1900)
- Eudasychira subeudela Dall'Asta, 1983
- Euproctis bigutta Holland, 1893
- Euproctis conizona Collenette, 1933
- Euproctis molunduana Aurivillius, 1925
- Euproctis pallida (Kirby, 1896)
- Euproctis utilis Swinhoe, 1903
- Hyaloperina nudiuscula Aurivillius, 1904
- Jacksoniana striata (Collenette, 1937)
- Lacipa jefferyi (Collenette, 1931)
- Laelia bifascia Hampson, 1905
- Laelia eutricha Collenette, 1931
- Laelia extorta (Distant, 1897)
- Laelia figlina Distant, 1899
- Laelia fracta Schaus & Clements, 1893
- Laelia gigantea Hampson, 1910
- Laelia rogersi Bethune-Baker, 1913
- Leucoma parva (Plötz, 1880)
- Mylantria xanthospila (Plötz, 1880)
- Neomardara africana (Holland, 1893)
- Olapa tavetensis (Holland, 1892)
- Orgyia hopkinsi Collenette, 1937
- Otroeda hesperia (Cramer, 1779)
- Porthesaroa lacipa Hering, 1926
- Sphragista kitchingi (Bethune-Baker, 1909)
- Tamsita ochthoeba (Hampson, 1920)

== Metarbelidae ==
- Mountelgonia urundiensis Lehmann, 2013

== Noctuidae ==
- Acontia secta Guenée, 1852
- Acontia transfigurata Wallengren, 1856
- Aegocera fervida (Walker, 1854)
- Aegocera obliqua Mabille, 1893
- Aegocera rectilinea Boisduval, 1836
- Crameria amabilis (Drury, 1773)
- Feliniopsis laportei Hacker & Fibiger, 2007
- Feliniopsis satellitis (Berio, 1974)
- Heraclia geryon (Fabricius, 1781)
- Heraclia monslunensis (Hampson, 1901)
- Heraclia superba (Butler, 1875)
- Metagarista triphaenoides Walker, 1854
- Mitrophrys menete (Cramer, 1775)
- Tuertella rema (Druce, 1910)

== Nolidae ==
- Blenina chrysochlora (Walker, 1865)

== Notodontidae ==
- Antheua gallans (Karsch, 1895)
- Antheua grisea (Gaede, 1928)
- Atrasana vittata Kiriakoff, 1969
- Stenostaura dorsalis Kiriakoff, 1969
- Thaumetopoea apologetica Strand, 1909

== Pterophoridae ==
- Pterophorus candidalis (Walker, 1864)

== Saturniidae ==
- Nudaurelia anthinoides Rougeot, 1978
- Pselaphelia vandenberghei Bouyer, 1992
- Tagoropsis hecqui Bouyer, 1989
- Tagoropsis rougeoti D. S. Fletcher, 1952
- Urota centralis Bouyer, 2008

== Tineidae ==
- Ceratophaga vastellus (Zeller, 1852)
- Cimitra fetialis (Meyrick, 1917)
- Perissomastix pantsa Gozmány, 1967
