= List of lymantriid genera: J =

The large moth subfamily Lymantriinae contains the following genera beginning with J:

- Jabaina
- Jacksoniana
