= Jacksonia =

Jacksonia may refer to:

- Jacksonia (plant), a genus of plants in the family Fabaceae
- Jacksonia (bug), a genus of true bugs in the family Aphididae
- Cesa waggae, a butterfly species with the genus synonym Jacksonia

== See also ==
- Jacksonian (disambiguation)
- Jacksoniana, a monotypic moth genus
