= Jacksonian =

Jacksonian may refer to:

- Jacksonian democracy, American political philosophy
- Jacksonian seizure, in neurology

== See also ==
- Jacksonia (disambiguation)
- Jacksoniana, a monotypic moth genus
