= G. polymorpha =

G. polymorpha may refer to:

- Gagea polymorpha, a spring lily
- Gigantopora polymorpha, a colonial invertebrate
- Gochnatia polymorpha, a South American tree
- Gracilanja polymorpha, an African moth
- Gregarina polymorpha, a parasitic protist
- Gyrtona polymorpha, an owlet moth
