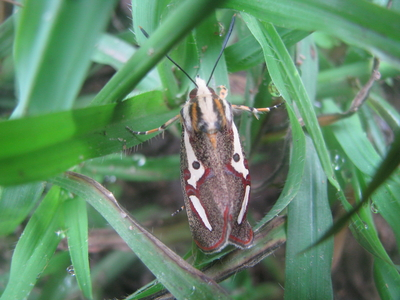
- Aegocera venulia

Scientific classification
- Kingdom: Animalia
- Phylum: Arthropoda
- Class: Insecta
- Order: Lepidoptera
- Superfamily: Noctuoidea
- Family: Noctuidae
- Subfamily: Agaristinae
- Genus: Aegocera; Latreille, 1809

= Aegocera =

Genus of moths

Aegocera is a genus of moths of the family Noctuidae first described by Pierre André Latreille in 1809.

== Description ==
Palpi with second joint clothed with long hair. Antennae strongly dilated distally. Forewings with veins 3, 4, and 5 from close to angle of cell and vein 6 from upper angle. Veins 9 and 10 anastomosing with 7 and 8 to form areole. Hindwings lack vein 5.

== Species ==
- Aegocera anthina Jordan, 1926
- Aegocera bettsi Wiltshire, 1988
- Aegocera brevivitta Hampson, 1901
- Aegocera bimacula Walker, 1854
- Aegocera ferrugo Jordan, 1926
- Aegocera fervida (Walker, 1854)
- Aegocera geometrica Hampson, 1910
- Aegocera humphreyi (Hampson, 1911)
- Aegocera jordani Kiriakoff, 1955
- Aegocera menete (Cramer, 1775)
- Aegocera naveli Le Cerf, 1922
- Aegocera obliqua Mabille, 1893
- Aegocera rectilinea Boisduval, 1836
- Aegocera tigrina (Druce, 1882)
- Aegocera tricolora Bethune-Baker, 1909
- Aegocera tripartita Kirby, 1880
- Aegocera venulia Cramer, [1777]
