= Laelia suffusa =

Scientific classification
- Kingdom: Animalia
- Phylum: Arthropoda
- Class: Insecta
- Order: Lepidoptera
- Superfamily: Noctuoidea
- Family: Erebidae
- Genus: Laelia
- Species: L. suffusa

Binomial name
- Laelia suffusa Hampson, 1893

Synonyms
- Ricine suffusa Walker, 1855; Prorodeca angulifera Walker, 1855

Species of moth

Laelia suffusa is a moth of the family Erebidae first described by George Hampson in 1893. It is found in Bangladesh, Sri Lanka, Java, East Indies, Sundaland, the Philippines and Sulawesi.

Adults show sexual dimorphism. Wingspan is about 14–18 mm. Both male and female has creamy-white body and wings. In males, there are six black spots on each forewing. Male has bipectinate (comb-like on both sides) antennae and female has pectinate (comb-like on one side) antennae. Male has a curved row of black flecks on the forewing between the end of the cell and the margin. Eggs brownish black and spherical. Caterpillar dark green with two subdorsal yellow stripes and pinkish-white sublaterals. Four tussocks are reddish brown. Pupa dark reddish brown. The caterpillar is known to feed on Oryza sativa, Saccharum officinarum, Cyperus digitatus, Imperata cylindrica, Zea mays and Paspalum.
