= Jana transvaalica =

Scientific classification
- Kingdom: Animalia
- Phylum: Arthropoda
- Class: Insecta
- Order: Lepidoptera
- Family: Eupterotidae
- Genus: Jana
- Species: J. transvaalica

Binomial name
- Jana transvaalica Strand, 1911

Species of moth

Jana transvaalica is a moth in the family Eupterotidae. It was described by Strand in 1911. The Global Lepidoptera Names Index has this as a synonym of Jana eurymas. It is found in South Africa.
