= Hoplojana zernyi =

Scientific classification
- Kingdom: Animalia
- Phylum: Arthropoda
- Class: Insecta
- Order: Lepidoptera
- Family: Eupterotidae
- Genus: Hoplojana
- Species: H. zernyi

Binomial name
- Hoplojana zernyi Gschwandner, 1923

Species of moth

Hoplojana zernyi is a moth in the family Eupterotidae. It was described by Robert Gschwandner in 1923. It is found in Tanzania.

== Physical attributes ==
The species has a wingspan of 152 mm.

== Etymology ==
It is named for the entomologist Dr. Hans Anton Zerny.
