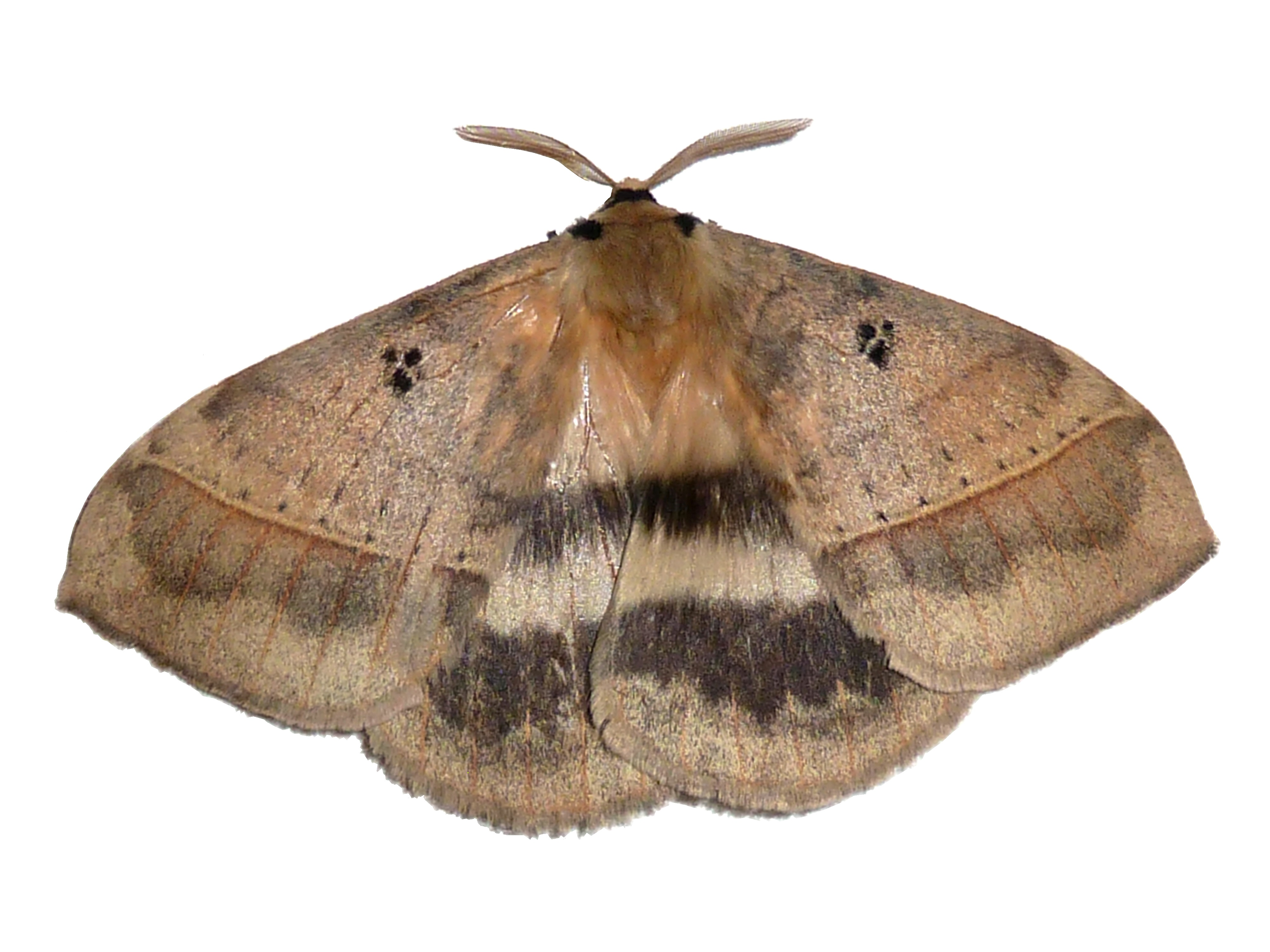
- Jana eurymas

Scientific classification
- Kingdom: Animalia
- Phylum: Arthropoda
- Class: Insecta
- Order: Lepidoptera
- Family: Eupterotidae
- Subfamily: Janinae
- Genus: Jana; Herrich-Schäffer, 1854

= Jana (moth) =

Genus of moths

Jana is a genus of moths from Africa in the family Eupterotidae. The genus was erected by Gottlieb August Wilhelm Herrich-Schäffer in 1854.

== Species ==
- Jana ampla Berger, 1980
- Jana anyagudae Stoneham, 1966
- Jana aurivilliusi Rothschild, 1917
- Jana basoko Berger, 1980
- Jana caesarea Weymer, 1909
- Jana demoulini Berger, 1980
- Jana dulcinea Stoneham, 1966
- Jana eurymas Herrich-Schäffer, 1854
- Jana fletcheri Berger, 1980
- Jana fontainei Berger, 1980
- Jana forbesi Berger, 1980
- Jana gaitea Stoneham, 1966
- Jana germana Rothschild, 1917
- Jana hecqui Berger, 1980
- Jana jeanae Stoneham, 1966
- Jana kivuensis Berger, 1980
- Jana nigrorufa Berger, 1980
- Jana overlaeti Berger, 1980
- Jana plagiatus Berger, 1980
- Jana preciosa Aurivillius, 1893
- Jana propinquestria Strand, 1911
- Jana pujoli Berger, 1980
- Jana roseata Rothschild, 1917
- Jana rustica Strand, 1911
- Jana seydeli Berger, 1980
- Jana transvaalica Strand, 1911
- Jana tripunctata (Aurivillius, 1898)
- Jana vandeschricki Berger, 1980
- Jana variegata Rothschild, 1917
- Jana viettei Berger, 1980
- Jana yokoana (Bethune-Baker, 1927)

== Former species ==
- Jana cosima Plötz, 1880
- Jana gracilis Walker, 1855
- Jana palliatella Viette, 1954
- Jana polymorpha Aurivillius, 1893
- Jana sciron Druce, [1888]
- Jana subrosea Aurivillius, 1893
