= Polacanthopoda =

Scientific classification
- Kingdom: Animalia
- Phylum: Arthropoda
- Class: Insecta
- Order: Lepidoptera
- Superfamily: Noctuoidea
- Family: Noctuidae
- Subfamily: Agaristinae
- Genus: Polacanthopoda; Hampson, 1901

Genus of moths

Polacanthopoda is a genus of moths of the family Noctuidae. The genus was erected by George Hampson in 1901

== Species ==
- Polacanthopoda anthina Jordan, 1926
- Polacanthopoda humphreyi Hampson, 1911
- Polacanthopoda naveli Le Cerf, 1922
- Polacanthopoda tigrina H. Druce, 1882

The Global Lepidoptera Names Index and Lepidoptera and Some Other Life Forms give this name as a synonym of Aegocera Latreille, 1809.
