= Laelia cardinalis =

Scientific classification
- Kingdom: Animalia
- Phylum: Arthropoda
- Class: Insecta
- Order: Lepidoptera
- Superfamily: Noctuoidea
- Family: Erebidae
- Genus: Laelia
- Species: L. cardinalis

Binomial name
- Laelia cardinalis Hampson, 1893

Synonyms
- Laelia fulvata Hampson, 1910

Species of moth

Laelia cardinalis is a moth of the family Erebidae first described by George Hampson in 1893. It is found in Sri Lanka.
