= Balacra alberici =

Scientific classification
- Domain: Eukaryota
- Kingdom: Animalia
- Phylum: Arthropoda
- Class: Insecta
- Order: Lepidoptera
- Superfamily: Noctuoidea
- Family: Erebidae
- Subfamily: Arctiinae
- Genus: Balacra
- Species: B. alberici

Binomial name
- Balacra alberici Dufrane, 1945

Species of moth

Balacra alberici is a moth of the family Erebidae. It was described by Abel Dufrane in 1945. It is found in the Democratic Republic of the Congo.
