= Balacra flava =

Scientific classification
- Domain: Eukaryota
- Kingdom: Animalia
- Phylum: Arthropoda
- Class: Insecta
- Order: Lepidoptera
- Superfamily: Noctuoidea
- Family: Erebidae
- Subfamily: Arctiinae
- Genus: Balacra
- Species: B. flava

Binomial name
- Balacra flava Przybylowicz, 2013

Species of moth

Balacra flava is a moth of the family Erebidae. It was described by Lukasz Przybylowicz in 2013. It is found in Cameroon.
