= Jana caesarea =

Scientific classification
- Kingdom: Animalia
- Phylum: Arthropoda
- Class: Insecta
- Order: Lepidoptera
- Family: Eupterotidae
- Genus: Jana
- Species: J. caesarea

Binomial name
- Jana caesarea Weymer, 1909

Species of moth

Jana caesarea is a moth of the family Eupterotidae. It can be found in Tanzania.

The body of the male of this species has a length of 51mm, the length of its forewings is 73 mm and its wingspan 134mm.. the forewings are grey-brown, they have two parallel transversal lines near the base. The hindwings are clear-grey, with two black-brown traversal lines. The underside of both wings is uniform brownish-ochreous yellow with two brownish transversal lines in the middle.
