= Balacra elegans =

Scientific classification
- Domain: Eukaryota
- Kingdom: Animalia
- Phylum: Arthropoda
- Class: Insecta
- Order: Lepidoptera
- Superfamily: Noctuoidea
- Family: Erebidae
- Subfamily: Arctiinae
- Genus: Balacra
- Species: B. elegans

Binomial name
- Balacra elegans Aurivillius, 1892

Synonyms
- Pseudapiconoma bumba Strand, 1918; Pseudapiconoma elegans var. currieri Dyar, 1899; Balacra damalis Holland, 1893; Balacra kivensis Dufrane, 1945

Species of moth

Balacra elegans is a moth of the family Erebidae. It was described by Per Olof Christopher Aurivillius in 1892 and is found in Cameroon, the Democratic Republic of the Congo, Equatorial Guinea, Liberia, Uganda and Zambia.
