= Aegoceropsis =

Scientific classification
- Domain: Eukaryota
- Kingdom: Animalia
- Phylum: Arthropoda
- Class: Insecta
- Order: Lepidoptera
- Superfamily: Noctuoidea
- Family: Noctuidae
- Subfamily: Agaristinae
- Genus: Aegoceropsis; Karsch, 1895

Genus of moths

Aegoceropsis is a genus of moths of the family Noctuidae.

== Species ==
- Aegoceropsis affinis Druce, 1883
- Aegoceropsis brevivitta Hampson, 1901
- Aegoceropsis ferrugo Jordan, 1926
- Aegoceropsis fervida Walker, 1854
- Aegoceropsis geometrica Hampson, 1910
- Aegoceropsis obliqua Mabille, 1893
- Aegoceropsis rectilinea Boisduval, 1836
- Aegoceropsis tricolora Bethune-Baker, 1909
