= Jana basoko =

Scientific classification
- Kingdom: Animalia
- Phylum: Arthropoda
- Class: Insecta
- Order: Lepidoptera
- Family: Eupterotidae
- Genus: Jana
- Species: J. basoko

Binomial name
- Jana basoko Berger, 1980

Species of moth

Jana basoko is a moth in the family Eupterotidae. It was described by Lucien A. Berger in 1980. It is found in Orientale Province of the Democratic Republic of the Congo.
