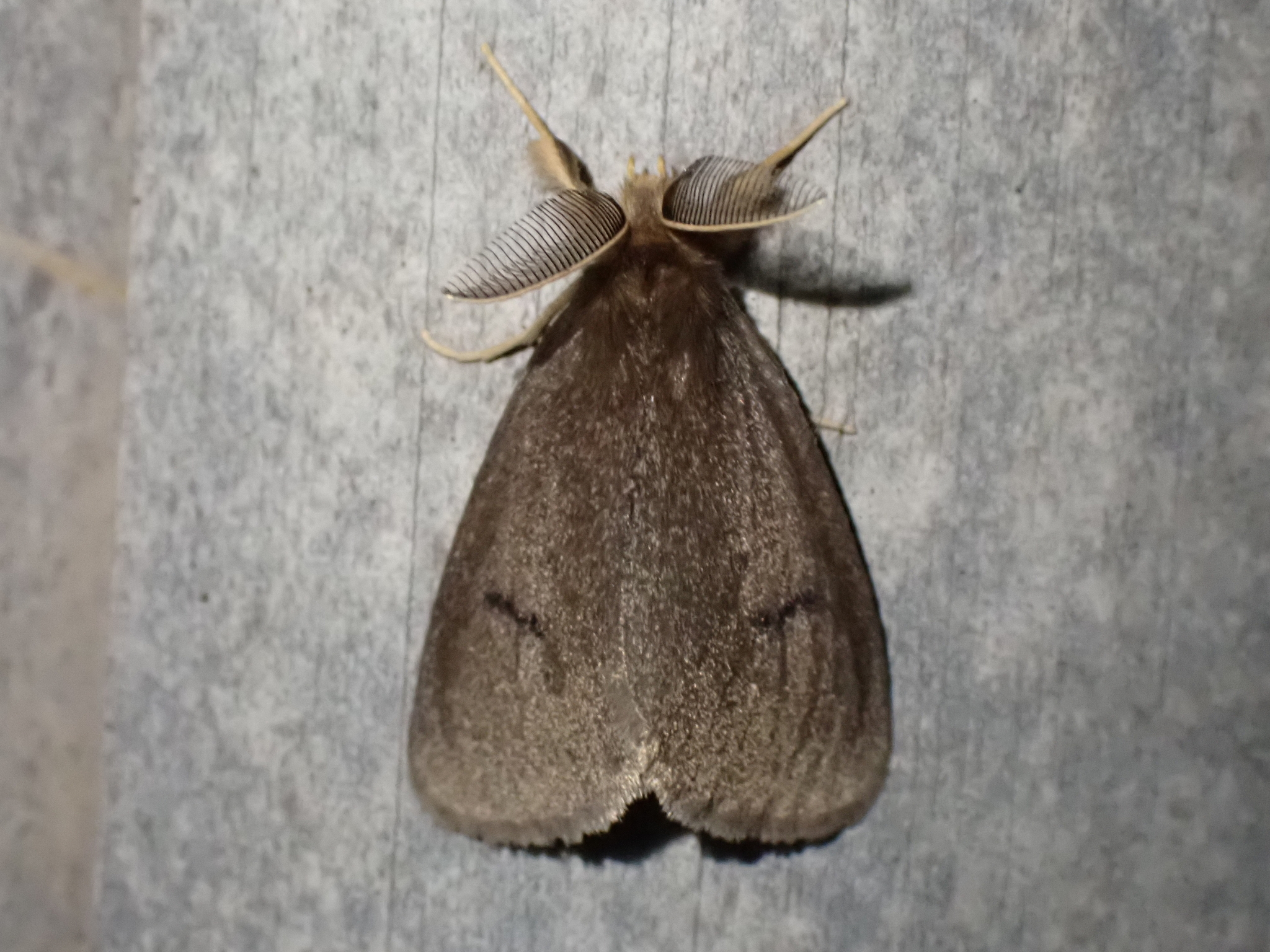

Scientific classification
- Kingdom: Animalia
- Phylum: Arthropoda
- Class: Insecta
- Order: Lepidoptera
- Superfamily: Noctuoidea
- Family: Erebidae
- Genus: Laelia
- Species: L. exclamationis

Binomial name
- Laelia exclamationis (Kollar, 1848)

Synonyms
- Euprepia exclamationis Kollar, 1848; Repena cervina Walker, 1855; Lacida rotundata Walker, 1855; Cycnia rubida Walker, [1865]; Lymantria disjucta Walker, 1865; Laelia rotunda Moore, [1883]; Laelia horishanella Matsumura, 1933

= Laelia exclamationis =

Species of moth

Laelia exclamationis is a moth of the family Erebidae first described by Vincenz Kollar in 1848. It is found in Sri Lanka, India and Taiwan.
