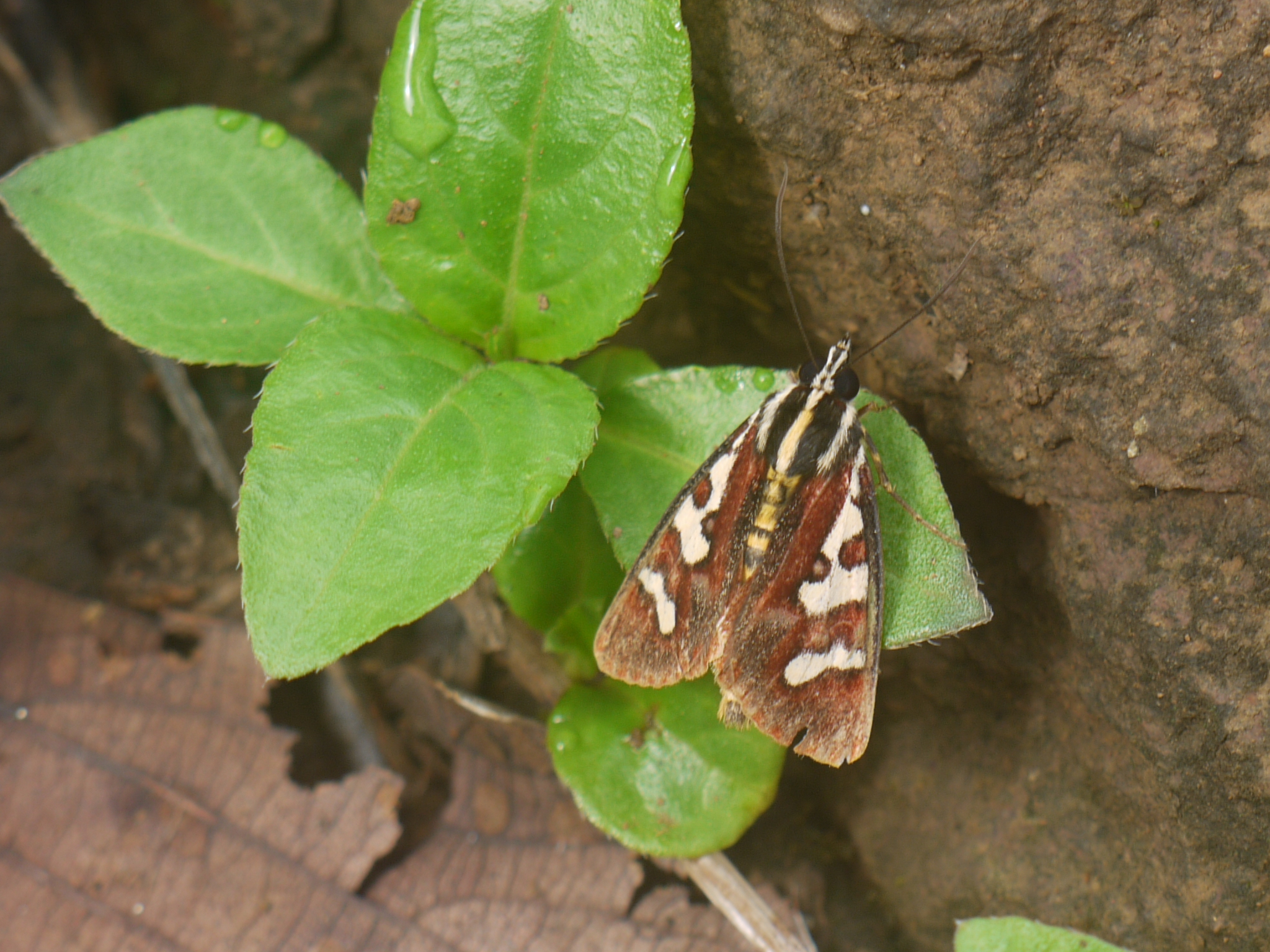

Scientific classification
- Kingdom: Animalia
- Phylum: Arthropoda
- Class: Insecta
- Order: Lepidoptera
- Superfamily: Noctuoidea
- Family: Noctuidae
- Genus: Aegocera
- Species: A. bimacula

Binomial name
- Aegocera bimacula Walker, 1854

= Aegocera bimacula =

Species of moth

Aegocera bimacula is a moth of the family Noctuidae first described by Francis Walker in 1854. It is found in India and Sri Lanka.

Larval host plants include Leea guineensis, Dillenia pentagyna and Vitis species.
