= Jana germana =

Scientific classification
- Kingdom: Animalia
- Phylum: Arthropoda
- Class: Insecta
- Order: Lepidoptera
- Family: Eupterotidae
- Genus: Jana
- Species: J. germana

Binomial name
- Jana germana Rothschild, 1917

Species of moth

Jana germana is a moth in the family Eupterotidae. It was described by Rothschild in 1917. It is found in Kenya.

The wingspan is about 102 mm. The forewings are dark grey speckled with pale-yellow scales and crossed by five more or less double zigzag blackish maroon bands. The hindwings are buff, somewhat speckled with black scales mostly on the outer half, and with three complete and one broken blackish maroon bands.
