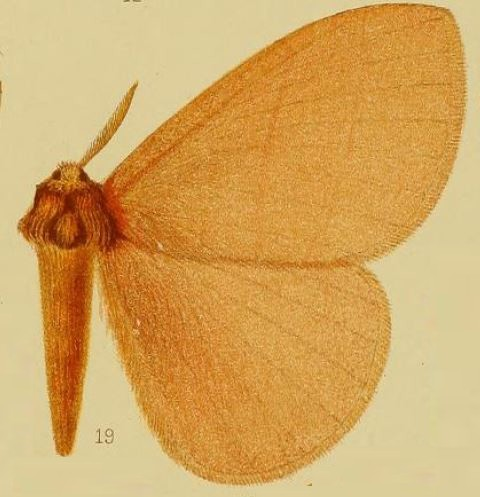
- Rhodopteriana anaemica

Scientific classification
- Kingdom: Animalia
- Phylum: Arthropoda
- Class: Insecta
- Order: Lepidoptera
- Family: Eupterotidae
- Subfamily: Janinae
- Genus: Rhodopteriana; Bouyer, 2011

= Rhodopteriana =

Genus of moths

Rhodopteriana is a genus of moths in the family Eupterotidae, which was described by Thierry Bouyer in 2011.

== Species ==
- Rhodopteriana abyssinica (Rothschild, 1917)
- Rhodopteriana anaemica (Hampson, 1910)
- Rhodopteriana distincta (Rothschild, 1917)
- Rhodopteriana funebris (Gaede, 1927)
- Rhodopteriana geita Darge, 2013
- Rhodopteriana gishwatiana Darge, 2013
- Rhodopteriana insignifica (Rothschild, 1917)
- Rhodopteriana iyayiana Darge, 2013
- Rhodopteriana kataviana Darge, 2013
- Rhodopteriana nakitomana Darge, 2013
- Rhodopteriana obscura (Aurivillius, 1893)
- Rhodopteriana rhodoptera (Gerstaecker, 1871)
- Rhodopteriana roseobrunnea (Rothschild, 1917)
- Rhodopteriana rungwana Darge, 2013
- Rhodopteriana salaamensis Darge, 2013
- Rhodopteriana sidamoensis Darge, 2013
- Rhodopteriana soricis (Rothschild, 1917)
- Rhodopteriana ulembwana Darge, 2013
