= Balacra brunnea =

Scientific classification
- Kingdom: Animalia
- Phylum: Arthropoda
- Class: Insecta
- Order: Lepidoptera
- Superfamily: Noctuoidea
- Family: Erebidae
- Subfamily: Arctiinae
- Genus: Balacra
- Species: B. brunnea

Binomial name
- Balacra brunnea (Grünberg, 1907)

Synonyms
- Pseudapiconoma preussi ab. brunnea Grünberg, 1907

Species of moth

Balacra brunnea is a moth of the family Erebidae. It was described by Karl Grünberg in 1907. It is found in Cameroon.
