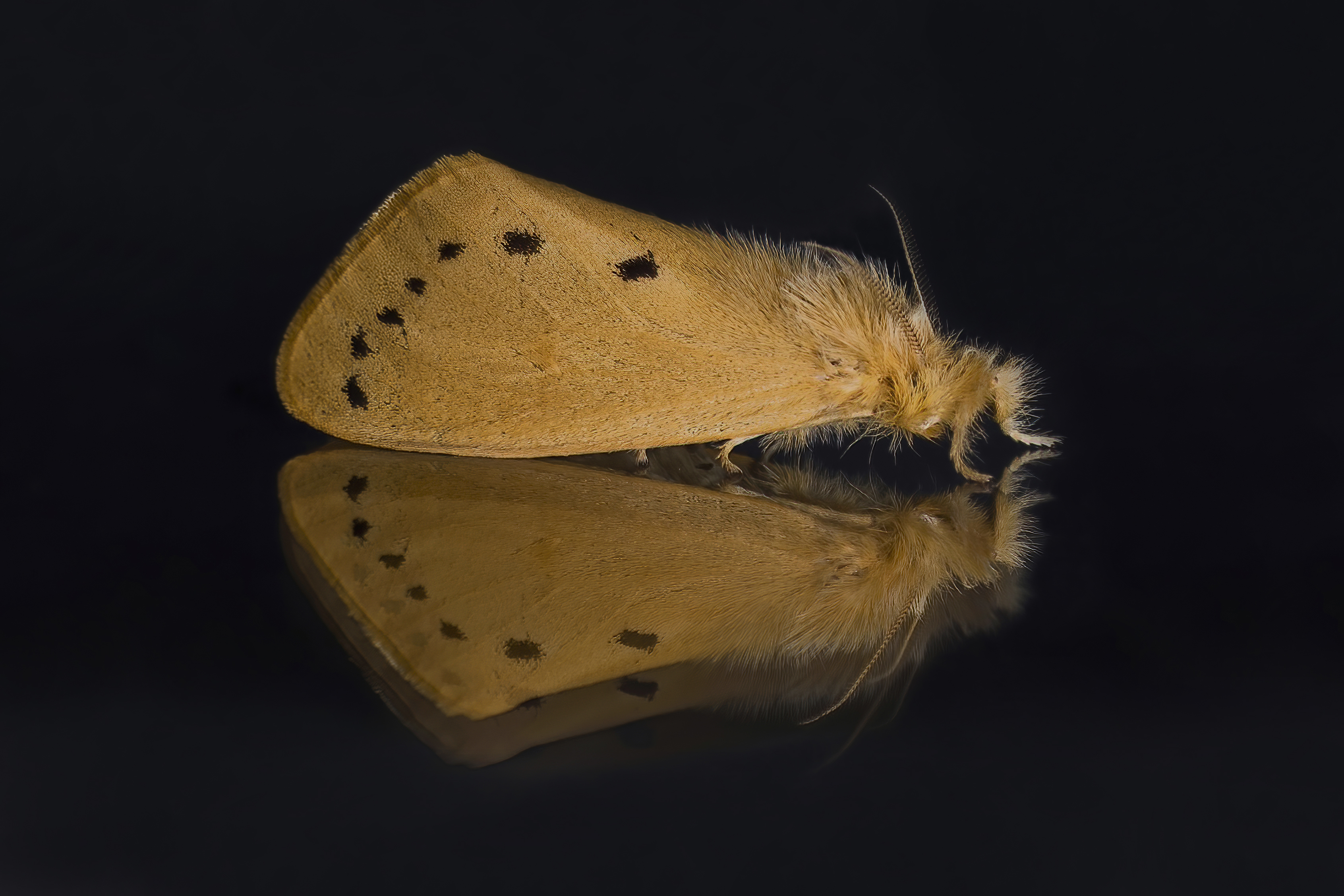
- Laelia sp. in Sri Lanka

Scientific classification
- Kingdom: Animalia
- Phylum: Arthropoda
- Class: Insecta
- Order: Lepidoptera
- Superfamily: Noctuoidea
- Family: Erebidae
- Subfamily: Lymantriinae
- Tribe: Orgyiini
- Genus: Laelia; Stephens, 1828

Synonyms
- Anthora Walker, 1855; Procodeca Walker, 1855; Charnidas Walker, 1855; Repena Walker, 1855; Ricine Walker, 1855; Odagra Walker, 1865; Baryaza Moore, 1879; Harapa Moore, 1879; Laelioides Moore, [1883]; Hondella Moore, [1883]; Laeliolina Hering, 1926

= Laelia (moth) =

Genus of moths

Laelia is a genus of tussock moths in the family Erebidae. The genus was erected by Stephens in 1828. Species are well distributed throughout Europe, Japan, China, India, Sri Lanka, Myanmar and Java.

== Description ==
They are nocturnal moths. Palpi long and porrect (extending forward) with heavily hairy second joint and long third joint. Antennae with long branches in males and short in females. Forewings are more produced than in species of the genus Aroa, where the wing membrane forms a slight concavity on the ventral side beyond the upper angle of cell. Neuration is similar.

== Species ==
- Laelia actuosa Hering, 1926
- Laelia acuta (Snellen, 1881)
- Laelia adalia Swinhoe, 1900
- Laelia aegra Hering, 1926
- Laelia amabilis Aurivillius, 1879
- Laelia amaura Hering, 1926
- Laelia amaurotera Collenette, 1932
- Laelia anamesa Collenette, 1934
- Laelia andricela Collenette, 1936
- Laelia atestacea Hampson, [1893]
- Laelia aureus Janse, 1915
- Laelia barsineides (Holland, 1893)
- Laelia basibrunnea (Holland, 1893)
- Laelia bethuneana Strand, 1914
- Laelia bifascia Hampson, 1905
- Laelia bilati Dufrane, 1940
- Laelia bonaberiensis (Strand, 1915)
- Laelia buana (Moore, 1859)
- Laelia buruana (Holland, 1900)
- Laelia calamaria Hampson, 1900
- Laelia cardinalis Hampson, [1893]
- Laelia cinnamomea (Moore, 1879)
- Laelia clarki Janse, 1915
- Laelia coenosa (Hübner, [1808])
- Laelia colon (Hampson, 1891)
- Laelia conioptera Collenette, 1936
- Laelia dabano Collenette, 1934
- Laelia devestita (Walker, 1865)
- Laelia dochmia Collenette, 1961
- Laelia eos Hering, 1926
- Laelia erythrobaphes Collenette, 1934
- Laelia eutricha Collenette, 1931
- Laelia exclamationis (Kollar, 1848)
- Laelia extrema Hering, 1926
- Laelia farinosa Röber, 1925
- Laelia fasciata (Moore, [1883])
- Laelia figlina Distant, 1899
- Laelia flandria Collenette, 1937
- Laelia fracta Schaus & Clemens, 1893
- Laelia furva Turner, 1931
- Laelia gigantea Butler, 1885
- Laelia gwelila (Swinhoe, 1903)
- Laelia haematica Hampson, 1905
- Laelia heringi Schultze, 1934
- Laelia heterogyna Hampson, [1893]
- Laelia hodopoea Collenette, 1955
- Laelia hypoleucis Holland, 1893
- Laelia janeschi Hering, 1926
- Laelia japonibia Strand, 1911
- Laelia juvenis (Walker, 1855)
- Laelia lavia Swinhoe, 1903
- Laelia leucolepis Mabille, 1897
- Laelia lignicolor Holland, 1893
- Laelia lilacina Moore, 1884
- Laelia litura (Walker, 1855)
- Laelia lophietes Collenette, 1932
- Laelia lutulenta Collenette, 1960
- Laelia marginepunctata Bethune-Baker, 1908
- Laelia mesoxantha Hering, 1926
- Laelia monoscola Collenette, 1934
- Laelia municipalis Distant, 1897
- Laelia nebrodes Collenette, 1947
- Laelia nigripulverea Janse, 1915
- Laelia obsoleta (Fabricius, 1793)
- Laelia ocellata Holland, 1893
- Laelia ochripalpis Strand, 1914
- Laelia omissa (Holland, 1893)
- Laelia ordinata (Karsch, 1895)
- Laelia orthra Collenette, 1936
- Laelia paetula (Hering, 1926)
- Laelia pallida Moore, 1884
- Laelia pantana Collenette, 1938
- Laelia perbrunnea Hampson, 1910
- Laelia phaeobalia Collenette, 1932
- Laelia phillipinensis Collenette, 1934
- Laelia polia Collenette, 1936
- Laelia prolata Swinhoe, 1892
- Laelia pulcherrima (Hering, 1926)
- Laelia punctulata (Butler, 1875)
- Laelia pyrrhothrix Collenette, 1938
- Laelia rhodea Collenette, 1947
- Laelia rivularis Hampson, 1910
- Laelia robusta Janse, 1915
- Laelia rogersi Bethune-Baker, 1913
- Laelia rosea Schaus & Clements, 1893
- Laelia rufolavia Hering, 1928
- Laelia siga Hering, 1926
- Laelia somalica Collenette, 1931
- Laelia stigmatica (Holland, 1893)
- Laelia straminea Hampson, 1910
- Laelia striata Wileman, 1910
- Laelia subrosea (Walker, 1855)
- Laelia subviridis Janse, 1915
- Laelia suffusa (Walker, 1855)
- Laelia swinnyi Janse, 1915
- Laelia testacea (Moore, 1879)
- Laelia turneri Collenette, 1934
- Laelia umbrina (Moore, 1888)
- Laelia unicoloris van Eecke, 1928
- Laelia uniformis Hampson, 1891
- Laelia venosa Moore, 1877
