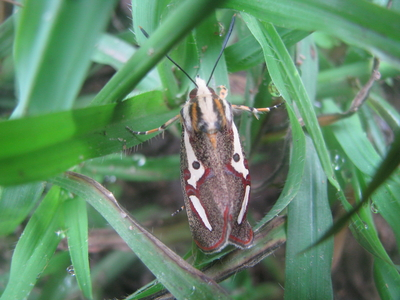

Scientific classification
- Domain: Eukaryota
- Kingdom: Animalia
- Phylum: Arthropoda
- Class: Insecta
- Order: Lepidoptera
- Superfamily: Noctuoidea
- Family: Noctuidae
- Genus: Aegocera
- Species: A. venulia

Binomial name
- Aegocera venulia (Cramer, [1777])

Synonyms
- Phalaena venulia Cramer, [1777]

= Aegocera venulia =

Species of moth

Aegocera venulia is a moth in the family Noctuidae first described by Pieter Cramer in 1777. It is found in India and Sri Lanka.

== Description ==
Its wingspan is about 33 mm. Forewings of male without costal vesicles. Forewings with longitudinal white streak entire, and with an indenture on its upper edge and a small black spots near its lower edge. A red marginal line is present. Cilia of both wings white.
