= Jana propinquestria =

Scientific classification
- Kingdom: Animalia
- Phylum: Arthropoda
- Class: Insecta
- Order: Lepidoptera
- Family: Eupterotidae
- Genus: Jana
- Species: J. propinquestria

Binomial name
- Jana propinquestria Strand, 1911

Species of moth

Jana propinquestria is a moth in the family Eupterotidae. It was described by Strand in 1911. It is found in Cameroon.
