= Jana plagiatus =

Scientific classification
- Kingdom: Animalia
- Phylum: Arthropoda
- Class: Insecta
- Order: Lepidoptera
- Family: Eupterotidae
- Genus: Jana
- Species: J. plagiatus

Binomial name
- Jana plagiatus Berger, 1980

Species of moth

Jana plagiatus is a moth in the family Eupterotidae. It was described by Lucien A. Berger in 1980. It is found in North Kivu province of the Democratic Republic of the Congo and in Malawi.
