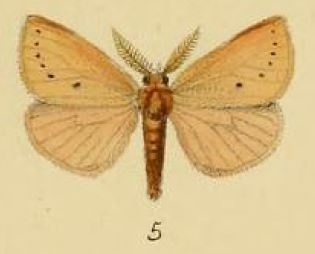

Scientific classification
- Domain: Eukaryota
- Kingdom: Animalia
- Phylum: Arthropoda
- Class: Insecta
- Order: Lepidoptera
- Superfamily: Noctuoidea
- Family: Erebidae
- Genus: Laelia
- Species: L. rosea

Binomial name
- Laelia rosea Schaus & Clements, 1893

= Laelia rosea (moth) =

Species of moth

Laelia rosea is a species of moth of the family Erebidae. It was described by William Schaus and W. G. Clements in 1893 and is found in Sierra Leone.
