= Balacra micromacula =

Scientific classification
- Domain: Eukaryota
- Kingdom: Animalia
- Phylum: Arthropoda
- Class: Insecta
- Order: Lepidoptera
- Superfamily: Noctuoidea
- Family: Erebidae
- Subfamily: Arctiinae
- Genus: Balacra
- Species: B. micromacula

Binomial name
- Balacra micromacula Strand, 1920

Species of moth

Balacra micromacula is a moth of the family Erebidae. It was described by Strand in 1920. It is found in Ghana.
