= Balacra batesi =

Scientific classification
- Kingdom: Animalia
- Phylum: Arthropoda
- Clade: Pancrustacea
- Class: Insecta
- Order: Lepidoptera
- Superfamily: Noctuoidea
- Family: Erebidae
- Subfamily: Arctiinae
- Genus: Balacra
- Species: B. batesi

Binomial name
- Balacra batesi (H. Druce, 1910)

Synonyms
- Pseudapiconoma batesi H. Druce, 1910; Pseudapiconoma batesi congoensis Rothschild, 1910; Pseudapiconoma flavimacula var. decora Oberthür, 1911; Balacra distincta Kiriakoff, 1953; Pseudapiconoma flavimacula ab. elegantissima Strand, 1912; Pseudapiconoma batesi ugandae Rothschild, 1910

Species of moth

Balacra batesi is a moth of the family Erebidae. It was described by Herbert Druce in 1910. It is found in Angola, Cameroon, the Democratic Republic of the Congo, Equatorial Guinea, Ghana, Nigeria and Uganda.
