= Jana kivuensis =

Scientific classification
- Kingdom: Animalia
- Phylum: Arthropoda
- Class: Insecta
- Order: Lepidoptera
- Family: Eupterotidae
- Genus: Jana
- Species: J. kivuensis

Binomial name
- Jana kivuensis Berger, 1980

Species of moth

Jana kivuensis is a moth in the family Eupterotidae. It was described by Lucien A. Berger in 1980. It is found in the provinces of South Kivu and North Kivu in the Democratic Republic of the Congo.
