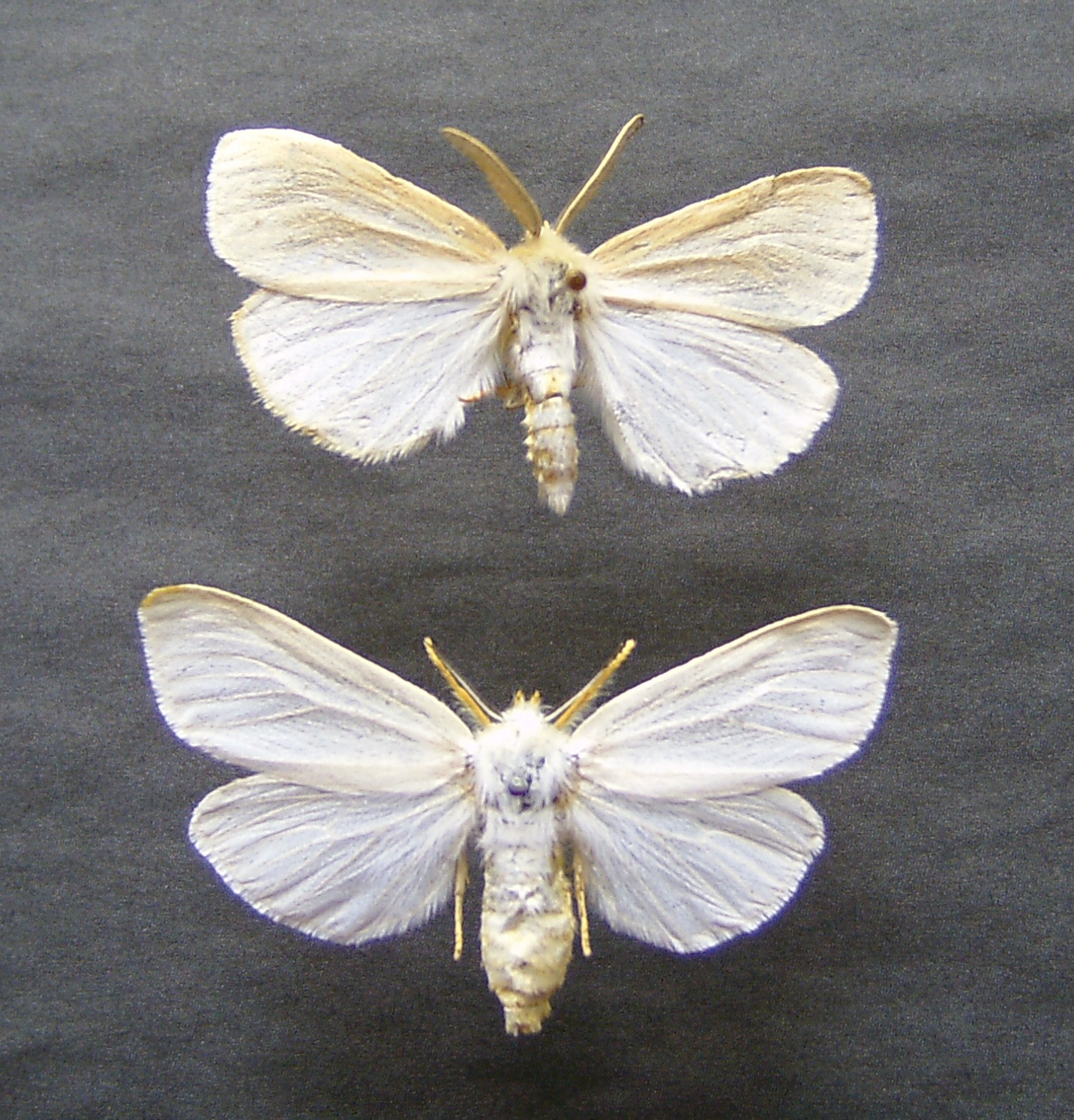
- Male (top), female (bottom)

Scientific classification
- Domain: Eukaryota
- Kingdom: Animalia
- Phylum: Arthropoda
- Class: Insecta
- Order: Lepidoptera
- Superfamily: Noctuoidea
- Family: Erebidae
- Genus: Laelia
- Species: L. coenosa

Binomial name
- Laelia coenosa (Hübner, 1808)

= Laelia coenosa =

Reed tussock

Species of moth

Laelia coenosa, the reed tussock, is a moth of the family Erebidae. The species was first described by Jacob Hübner in 1808. It is found in North Africa, southern and central Europe, through Russia and eastern Asia up to Japan.

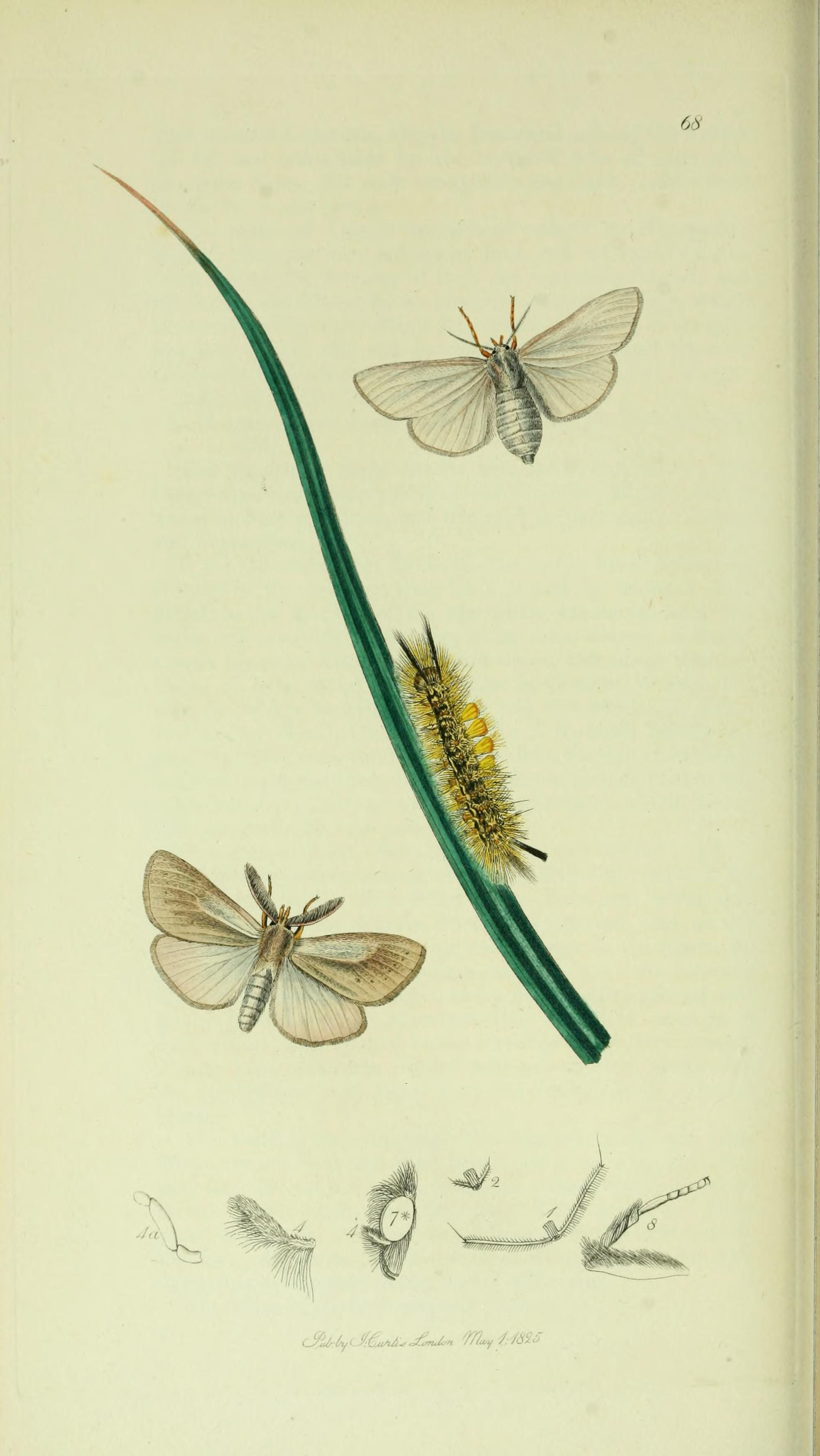
Illustration from John Curtis's British Entomology Volume 5

The wingspan is 35–50 mm. In the male the forewings are whitish ochreous, brownish tinged, especially towards the costa. There is a very indistinct fuscous discal dot and a posterior series of several fuscous dots between veins. The hindwings are whitish, towards apex brownish tinged. In the female the forewings and hindwings are whitish. Larva blackish, hairs yellowish; pencils on 2 and 12 brownish or blackish, tufts on 5 through 8 yellowish.

The larvae primarily feed on Phragmites australis and Phragmites communis, but also Festuca, Carex and Cladium species. The moth flies from July to August depending on the location.
