= Balacra jaensis =

Scientific classification
- Kingdom: Animalia
- Phylum: Arthropoda
- Class: Insecta
- Order: Lepidoptera
- Superfamily: Noctuoidea
- Family: Erebidae
- Subfamily: Arctiinae
- Genus: Balacra
- Species: B. jaensis

Binomial name
- Balacra jaensis Bethune-Baker, 1927

Species of moth

Balacra jaensis is a moth of the family Erebidae. It was described by George Thomas Bethune-Baker in 1927. It is found in Cameroon and the Democratic Republic of the Congo.

The wingspan is about 57 mm. The forewings are very pale ochreous, with the neuration prominently darkish brown, and a brownish subapical cloud, as well as a darker cloud below the basal part of vein two, extending onto the inner margin. The hindwings are white and subhyaline.
