= Balacra furva =

Scientific classification
- Kingdom: Animalia
- Phylum: Arthropoda
- Class: Insecta
- Order: Lepidoptera
- Superfamily: Noctuoidea
- Family: Erebidae
- Subfamily: Arctiinae
- Genus: Balacra
- Species: B. furva

Binomial name
- Balacra furva Hampson, 1911

Species of moth

Balacra furva is a moth of the family Erebidae. It was described by George Hampson in 1911. It is found in Ghana and Ivory Coast.
