= Balacra guillemei =

Scientific classification
- Domain: Eukaryota
- Kingdom: Animalia
- Phylum: Arthropoda
- Class: Insecta
- Order: Lepidoptera
- Superfamily: Noctuoidea
- Family: Erebidae
- Subfamily: Arctiinae
- Genus: Balacra
- Species: B. guillemei

Binomial name
- Balacra guillemei (Oberthür, 1911)

Synonyms
- Pseudapiconoma guillemei Oberthür, 1911; Balacra erubescens Joicey & Talbot, 1924

Species of moth

Balacra guillemei is a moth of the family Erebidae. It was described by Oberthür in 1911. It is found in the Democratic Republic of Congo.
