= Balacra humphreyi =

Scientific classification
- Kingdom: Animalia
- Phylum: Arthropoda
- Class: Insecta
- Order: Lepidoptera
- Superfamily: Noctuoidea
- Family: Erebidae
- Subfamily: Arctiinae
- Genus: Balacra
- Species: B. humphreyi

Binomial name
- Balacra humphreyi Rothschild, 1912

Synonyms
- Balacra humfreyi Hampson, 1914; Balacra intermedia Rothschild, 1912

Species of moth

Balacra humphreyi is a moth of the family Erebidae. It was described by Rothschild in 1912. It is found in the Democratic Republic of Congo, Ghana, Guinea, Nigeria, Sierra Leone and Uganda.
