= Balacra nigripennis =

Scientific classification
- Kingdom: Animalia
- Phylum: Arthropoda
- Class: Insecta
- Order: Lepidoptera
- Superfamily: Noctuoidea
- Family: Erebidae
- Subfamily: Arctiinae
- Genus: Balacra
- Species: B. nigripennis

Binomial name
- Balacra nigripennis (Aurivillius, 1904)

Synonyms
- Megapisa nigripennis Aurivillius, 1904; Pseudapiconoma gloriosa Jordan, 1904; Pseucapiconoma speculigera ab. obliterata Grünberg, 1907

Species of moth

Balacra nigripennis is a moth of the family Erebidae. It was described by Per Olof Christopher Aurivillius in 1904 and is found in Angola, Cameroon, the Central African Republic, the Democratic Republic of the Congo and Tanzania.
