= Rhodopteriana geita =

Scientific classification
- Kingdom: Animalia
- Phylum: Arthropoda
- Class: Insecta
- Order: Lepidoptera
- Family: Eupterotidae
- Genus: Rhodopteriana
- Species: R. geita

Binomial name
- Rhodopteriana geita Darge, 2013

Species of moth

Rhodopteriana geita is a moth in the family Eupterotidae. It was described by Philippe Darge in 2013. It is found in Tanzania.
