= Jana preciosa =

Scientific classification
- Kingdom: Animalia
- Phylum: Arthropoda
- Class: Insecta
- Order: Lepidoptera
- Family: Eupterotidae
- Genus: Jana
- Species: J. preciosa

Binomial name
- Jana preciosa Aurivillius, 1893

Species of moth

Jana preciosa is a moth in the family Eupterotidae. It was described by Per Olof Christopher Aurivillius in 1893. It is found in Cameroon, the Republic of the Congo, the Democratic Republic of the Congo, Kenya, Tanzania and Uganda.
