= Balacra similis =

Scientific classification
- Kingdom: Animalia
- Phylum: Arthropoda
- Class: Insecta
- Order: Lepidoptera
- Superfamily: Noctuoidea
- Family: Erebidae
- Subfamily: Arctiinae
- Genus: Balacra
- Species: B. similis

Binomial name
- Balacra similis Hulstaert, 1923

Species of moth

Balacra similis is a moth of the family Erebidae. It was described by Gustaaf Hulstaert in 1923. It is found in the Democratic Republic of the Congo.
