= Balacra diaphana =

Scientific classification
- Kingdom: Animalia
- Phylum: Arthropoda
- Class: Insecta
- Order: Lepidoptera
- Superfamily: Noctuoidea
- Family: Erebidae
- Subfamily: Arctiinae
- Genus: Balacra
- Species: B. diaphana

Binomial name
- Balacra diaphana Kiriakoff, 1957

Species of moth

Balacra diaphana is a moth of the family Erebidae. It was described by Sergius G. Kiriakoff in 1957. It is found in Uganda.
