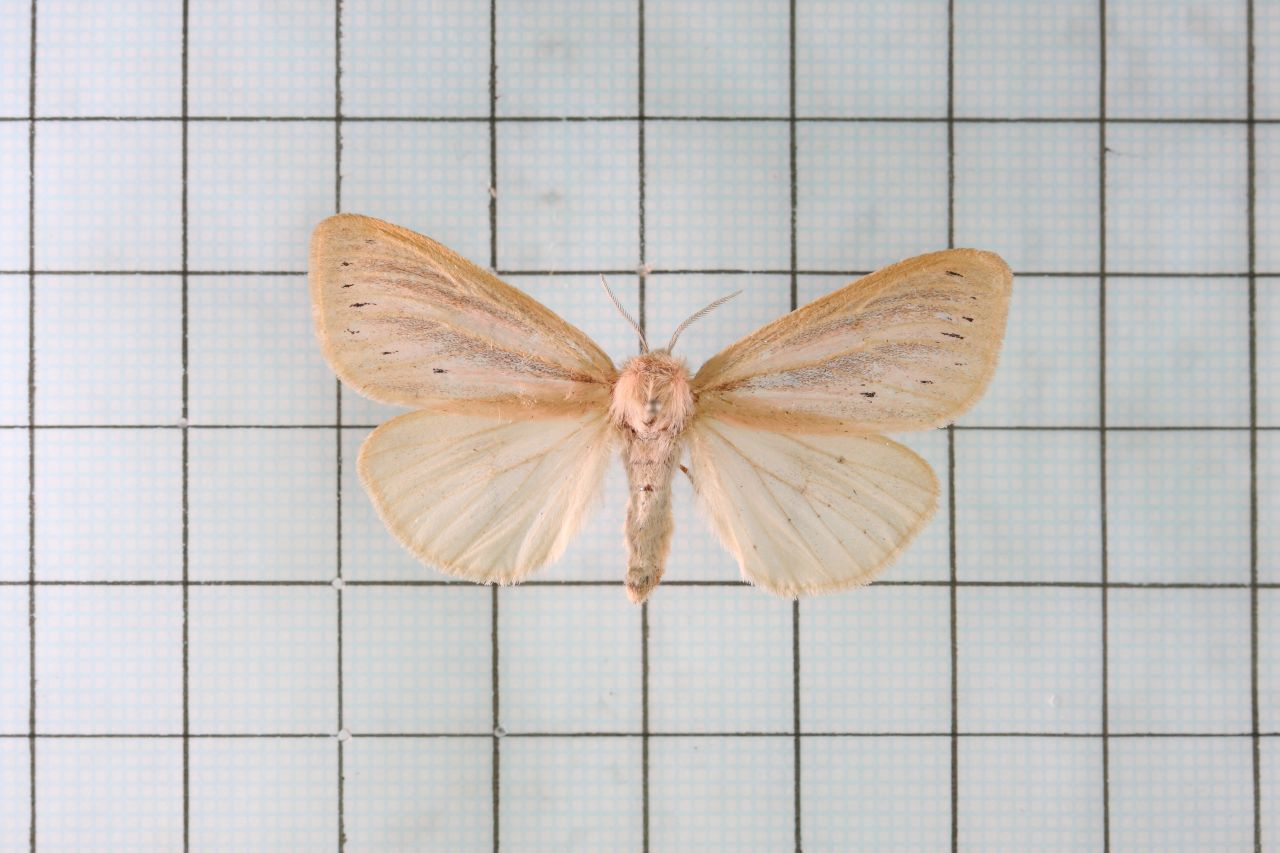

Scientific classification
- Kingdom: Animalia
- Phylum: Arthropoda
- Class: Insecta
- Order: Lepidoptera
- Superfamily: Noctuoidea
- Family: Erebidae
- Genus: Laelia
- Species: L. striata

Binomial name
- Laelia striata Wileman, 1910

= Laelia striata =

Species of moth

Laelia striata is a species of moth of the family Erebidae first described by Alfred Ernest Wileman in 1910. It is found in Taiwan.

The wingspan is 34–49 mm.
