= Balacra monotonia =

Scientific classification
- Domain: Eukaryota
- Kingdom: Animalia
- Phylum: Arthropoda
- Class: Insecta
- Order: Lepidoptera
- Superfamily: Noctuoidea
- Family: Erebidae
- Subfamily: Arctiinae
- Genus: Balacra
- Species: B. monotonia

Binomial name
- Balacra monotonia (Strand, 1912)

Synonyms
- Pseudapiconoma flavimacula var. monotonia Strand, 1912; Balacra simplex Aurivillius, 1925; Balacra rubrovitta angolernsis Kiriakoff, 1961; Balacra simplicior Kiriakoff, 1957

Species of moth

Balacra monotonia is a moth of the family Erebidae. It was described by Strand in 1912. It is found in Angola, Cameroon, the Republic of Congo and Equatorial Guinea.
