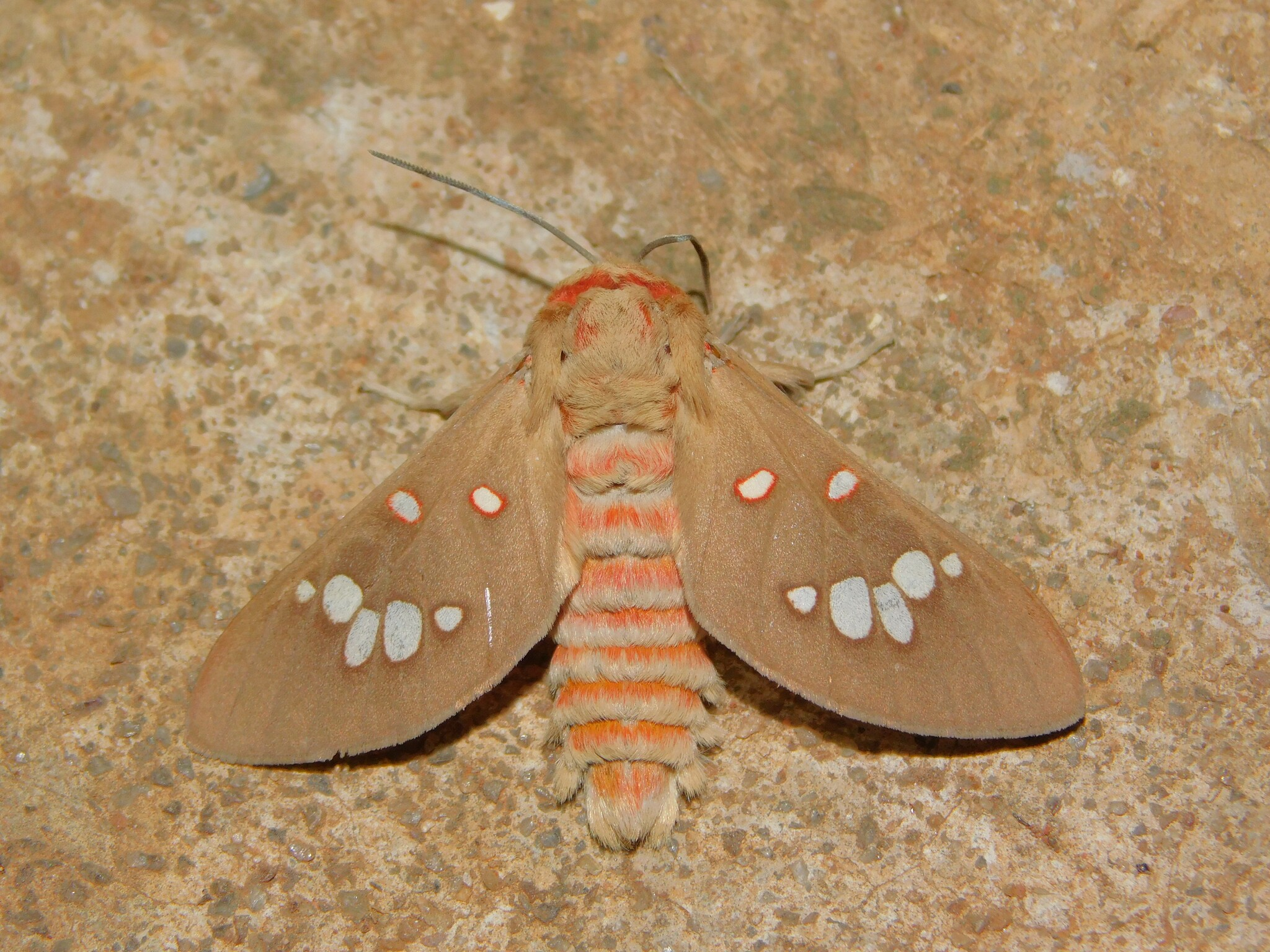

Scientific classification
- Kingdom: Animalia
- Phylum: Arthropoda
- Class: Insecta
- Order: Lepidoptera
- Superfamily: Noctuoidea
- Family: Erebidae
- Subfamily: Arctiinae
- Genus: Balacra
- Species: B. preussi

Binomial name
- Balacra preussi (Aurivillius, 1904)

Synonyms
- Metarctia preussi Aurivillius, 1904; Pseudapiconoma laureola Druce, 1910; Pseudapiconoma preussi ab. longimaculata Strand, 1912; Balacra preussi ab. punctata Dufrane, 1945; Pseudapiconoma speculigera Grünberg, 1907; Pseudapiconoma umbra Druce, 1910; Balacra vitreigutta Hulstaert, 1923

= Balacra preussi =

Species of moth

Balacra preussi is a moth of the family Erebidae. It was described by Per Olof Christopher Aurivillius in 1904 and is found in Cameroon, the Democratic Republic of the Congo, Equatorial Guinea, Ivory Coast, Kenya, Nigeria and Tanzania.
