= Rhodopteriana nakitomana =

Scientific classification
- Kingdom: Animalia
- Phylum: Arthropoda
- Class: Insecta
- Order: Lepidoptera
- Family: Eupterotidae
- Genus: Rhodopteriana
- Species: R. nakitomana

Binomial name
- Rhodopteriana nakitomana Darge, 2013

Species of moth

Rhodopteriana nakitomana is a moth in the family Eupterotidae. It was described by Philippe Darge in 2013. It is found in Uganda.
