= Jana aurivilliusi =

Scientific classification
- Kingdom: Animalia
- Phylum: Arthropoda
- Class: Insecta
- Order: Lepidoptera
- Family: Eupterotidae
- Genus: Jana
- Species: J. aurivilliusi

Binomial name
- Jana aurivilliusi Rothschild, 1917

Species of moth

Jana aurivilliusi is a moth in the family Eupterotidae. It was described by Rothschild in 1917. It is found in Nigeria.

== Physical description ==
The wingspan is about 182 mm. The forewings are buffish wood-brown much powdered with black and with a pale buff stigma between which and the base are two irregular incomplete black bands. There are also median, postmedian and subterminal zigzag double black bands. The hindwings are less powdered with black than the forewing and have a large intensely black subbasal patch and antemedian, two postmedian and subterminal crenulate broad black bands.
