= Hoplojana watsoni =

Scientific classification
- Kingdom: Animalia
- Phylum: Arthropoda
- Clade: Pancrustacea
- Class: Insecta
- Order: Lepidoptera
- Family: Eupterotidae
- Genus: Hoplojana
- Species: H. watsoni

Binomial name
- Hoplojana watsoni (Berger, 1980)

Synonyms
- Jana watsoni Berger, 1980

Species of moth

Hoplojana watsoni is a moth in the family Eupterotidae. It was described by Lucien A. Berger in 1980. It is found in Cameroon, the Central African Republic and the Democratic Republic of the Congo.
