= Jana gaitea =

Scientific classification
- Kingdom: Animalia
- Phylum: Arthropoda
- Class: Insecta
- Order: Lepidoptera
- Family: Eupterotidae
- Genus: Jana
- Species: J. gaitea

Binomial name
- Jana gaitea Stoneham, 1966

Species of moth

Jana gaitea is a moth in the family Eupterotidae. It was described by Stoneham in 1966. It is found in Africa.
