= Hoplojana politzari =

Scientific classification
- Kingdom: Animalia
- Phylum: Arthropoda
- Clade: Pancrustacea
- Class: Insecta
- Order: Lepidoptera
- Family: Eupterotidae
- Genus: Hoplojana
- Species: H. politzari

Binomial name
- Hoplojana politzari Basquin, 2013

Species of moth

Hoplojana politzari is a moth in the family Eupterotidae. It was described by Patrick Basquin in 2013. It is found in Somalia.
