= Balacra basilewskyi =

Scientific classification
- Domain: Eukaryota
- Kingdom: Animalia
- Phylum: Arthropoda
- Class: Insecta
- Order: Lepidoptera
- Superfamily: Noctuoidea
- Family: Erebidae
- Subfamily: Arctiinae
- Genus: Balacra
- Species: B. basilewskyi

Binomial name
- Balacra basilewskyi Kiriakoff, 1953

Species of moth

Balacra basilewskyi is a moth of the family Erebidae. It was described by Sergius G. Kiriakoff in 1953. It is found in the Afrotropical realm.
