= Jana viettei =

Scientific classification
- Kingdom: Animalia
- Phylum: Arthropoda
- Class: Insecta
- Order: Lepidoptera
- Family: Eupterotidae
- Genus: Jana
- Species: J. viettei

Binomial name
- Jana viettei Berger, 1980

Species of moth

Jana viettei is a moth in the family Eupterotidae. It was described by Lucien A. Berger in 1980. It is found in the Central African Republic.
