= Jana variegata =

Scientific classification
- Kingdom: Animalia
- Phylum: Arthropoda
- Class: Insecta
- Order: Lepidoptera
- Family: Eupterotidae
- Genus: Jana
- Species: J. variegata

Binomial name
- Jana variegata Rothschild, 1917

Species of moth

Jana variegata is a moth in the family Eupterotidae. It was described by Rothschild in 1917. It is found in Angola.

The wingspan is about 103 mm for females and 125 mm for males. The forewings are olivaceous cinnamon-brown, on the basal five-sixths nervures broadly black, as are numerous irregular crossbars, variegated with white edged by a convex post-discal double band outwardly black, inwardly white. The outer one-sixth with the nervures much less broadly white and two subterminal black bands, the inner wider and more intense black. The hindwings are brownish cinnamon-buff with an intense velvety black large subbasal ovoid patch, two broad discal black bands with the interspace much clouded with black and with two postdiscal subterminal black bands of varying width and intensity.
