= Balacra flavimacula =

Scientific classification
- Kingdom: Animalia
- Phylum: Arthropoda
- Clade: Pancrustacea
- Class: Insecta
- Order: Lepidoptera
- Superfamily: Noctuoidea
- Family: Erebidae
- Subfamily: Arctiinae
- Genus: Balacra
- Species: B. flavimacula

Binomial name
- Balacra flavimacula Walker, 1856

Synonyms
- Pseudapiconoma testacea ab. separata Strand, 1917; Pseudapiconoma testacea Aurivillius, 1881

Species of moth

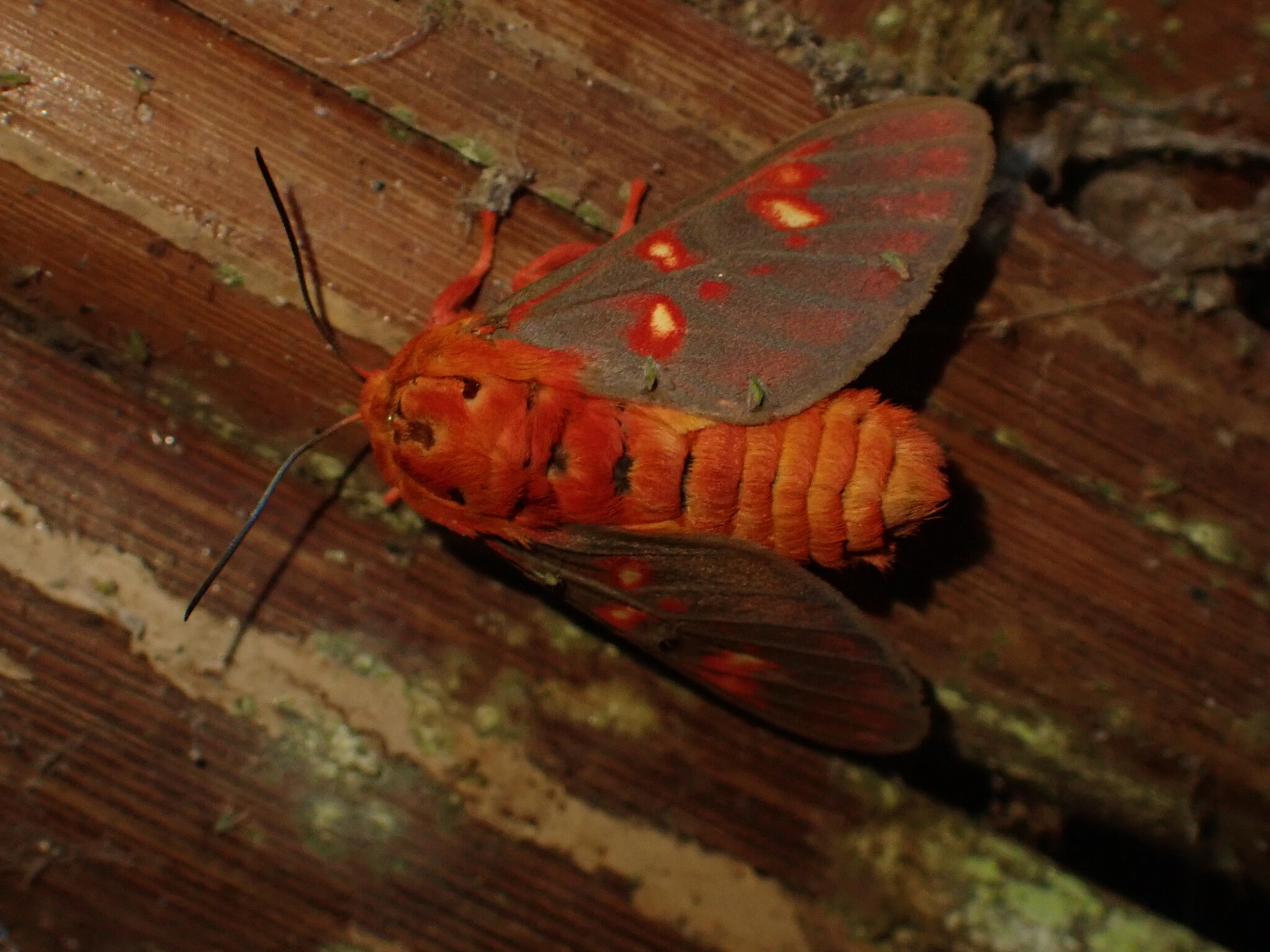
Balacra flavimacula in Cameroon

Balacra flavimacula is a moth of the family Erebidae. It was described by Francis Walker in 1856. It is found in Angola, Cameroon, the Republic of the Congo, the Democratic Republic of the Congo, Equatorial Guinea, Gabon, Ghana, Guinea, Ivory Coast, Kenya, Nigeria, Tanzania and Uganda.
