= Balacra caeruleifascia =

Scientific classification
- Kingdom: Animalia
- Phylum: Arthropoda
- Clade: Pancrustacea
- Class: Insecta
- Order: Lepidoptera
- Superfamily: Noctuoidea
- Family: Erebidae
- Subfamily: Arctiinae
- Genus: Balacra
- Species: B. caeruleifascia

Binomial name
- Balacra caeruleifascia Walker, 1856

Synonyms
- Metarctia erubescens var. conradti Oberthür, 1911; Automolis ehrmanni Holland, 1893; Balacra germana Rothschild, 1912; Balacra inflammata Hampson, 1914; Balacra magna Hulstaert, 1923; Balacra ochracea Walker, 1869

Species of moth

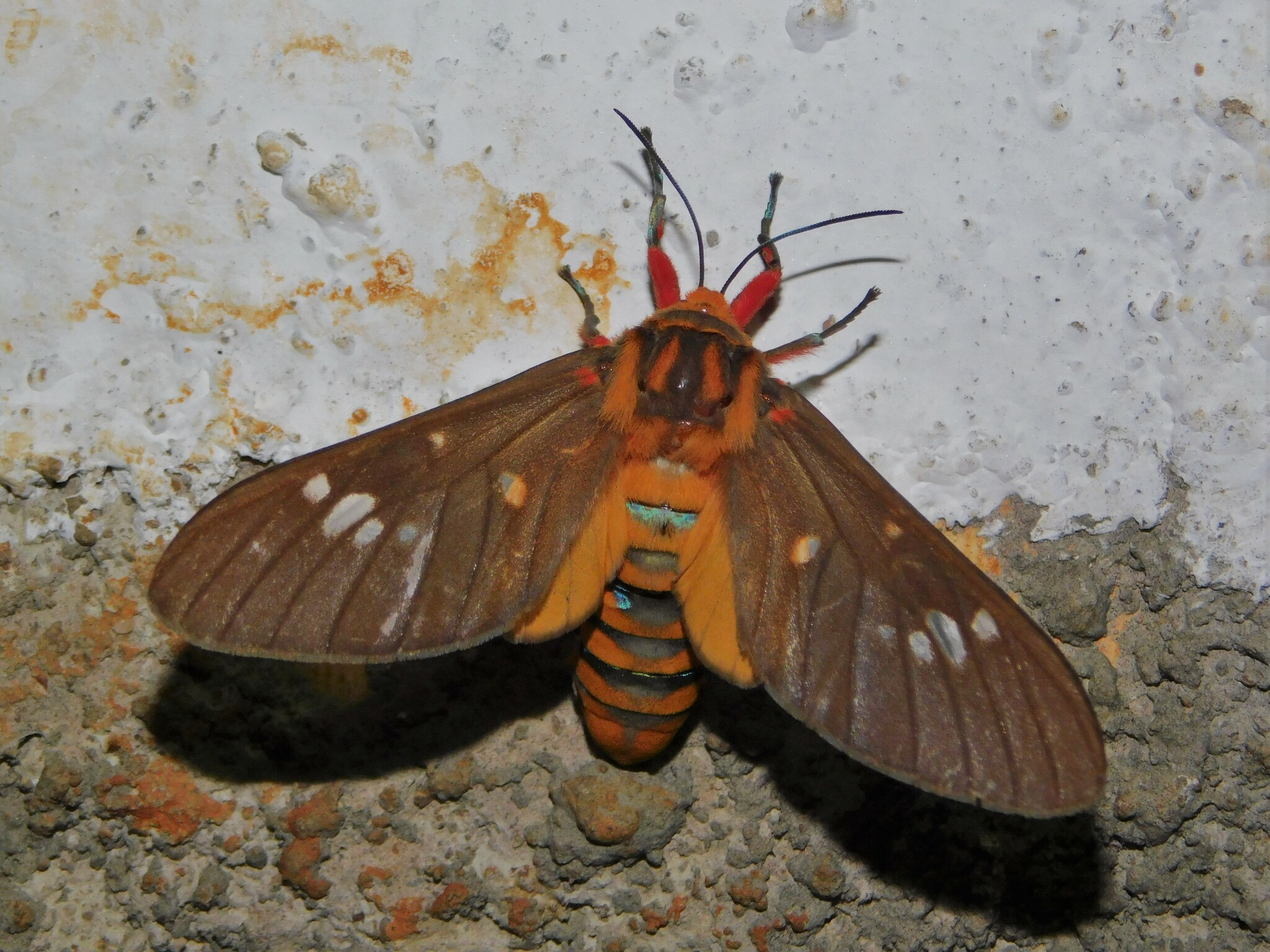
Balacra caeruleifascia in Uganda

Balacra caeruleifascia is a moth of the family Erebidae. It was described by Francis Walker in 1856. It is found in Angola, Cameroon, the Democratic Republic of the Congo, Ghana, Guinea, Ivory Coast, Liberia, Nigeria, Sierra Leone and Togo. It uses coffee for its larval food
