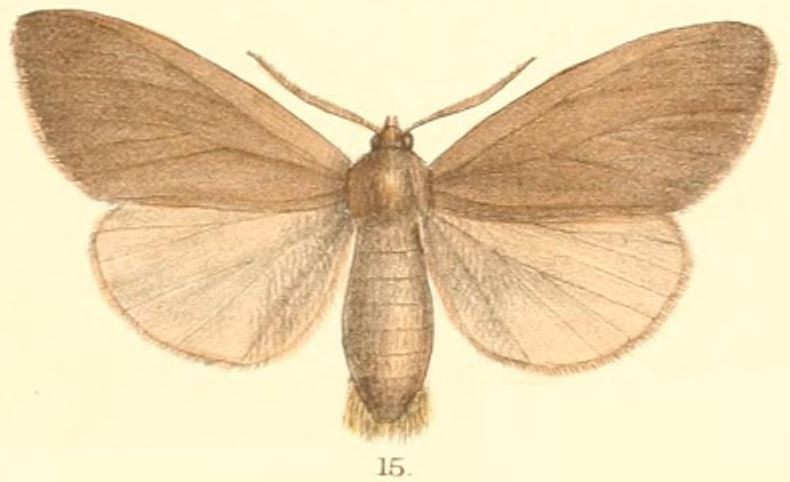

Scientific classification
- Kingdom: Animalia
- Phylum: Arthropoda
- Class: Insecta
- Order: Lepidoptera
- Superfamily: Noctuoidea
- Family: Erebidae
- Genus: Laelia
- Species: L. testacea

Binomial name
- Laelia testacea (Walker, 1855)

Synonyms
- Cycnia testacea Walker, 1855

= Laelia testacea =

Species of moth

Laelia testacea is a moth of the family Erebidae first described by Francis Walker in 1855. It is found in India and Sri Lanka.

Palpi long and porrect (extending forward). Antennae bipectinate (comb like on both sides). Males have a blackish subapical patch to forewing, while females have an ochreous tinge.
