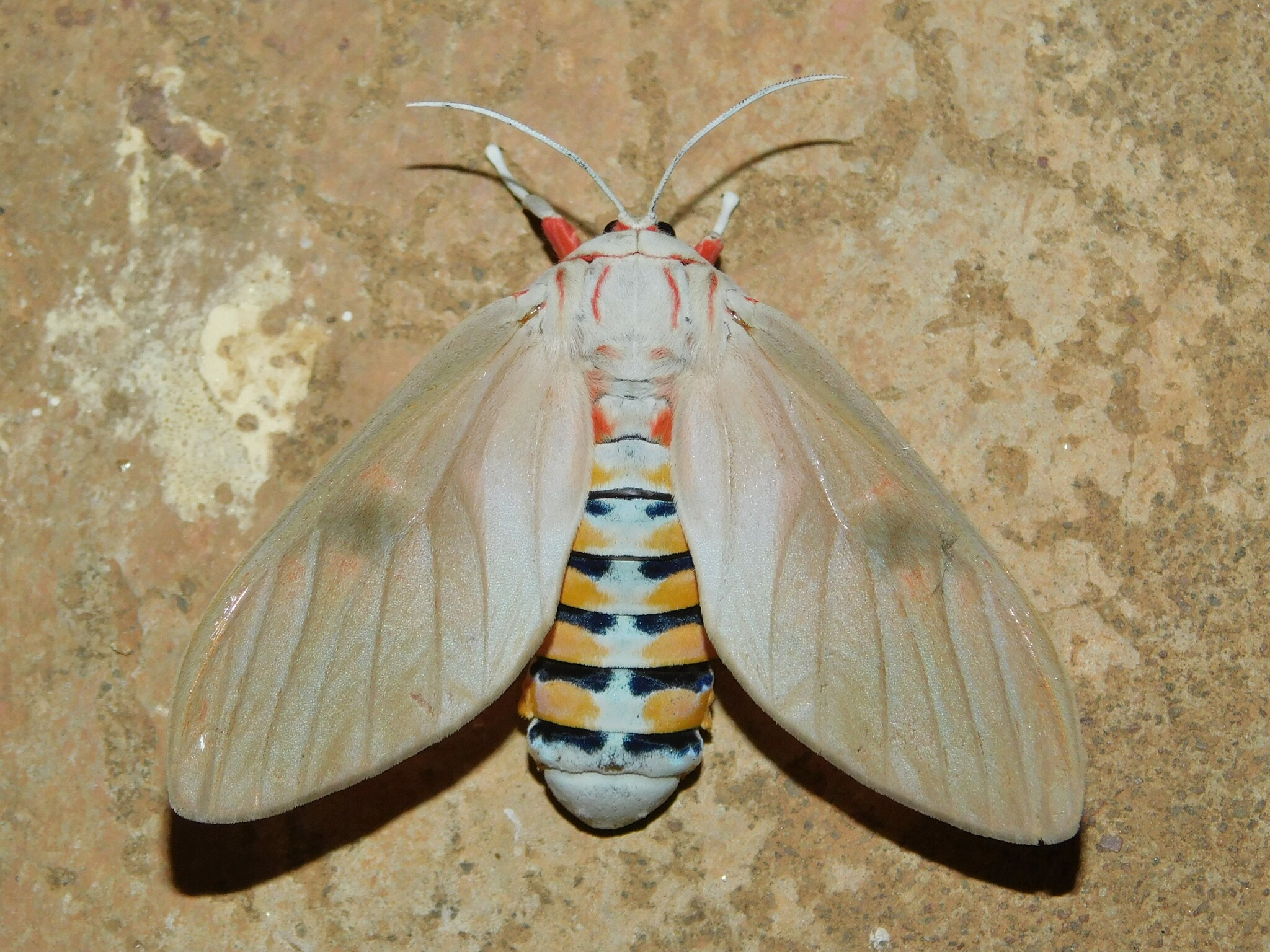

Scientific classification
- Kingdom: Animalia
- Phylum: Arthropoda
- Clade: Pancrustacea
- Class: Insecta
- Order: Lepidoptera
- Superfamily: Noctuoidea
- Family: Erebidae
- Subfamily: Arctiinae
- Genus: Balacra
- Species: B. herona

Binomial name
- Balacra herona (H. Druce, 1887)

Synonyms
- Anace herona H. Druce, 1887

= Balacra herona =

Species of moth

Balacra herona is a moth of the family Erebidae. It was described by Herbert Druce in 1887. It is found in Cameroon, the Democratic Republic of the Congo, Ghana, Ivory Coast and Nigeria.
