= Hoplojana indecisa =

Scientific classification
- Kingdom: Animalia
- Phylum: Arthropoda
- Class: Insecta
- Order: Lepidoptera
- Family: Eupterotidae
- Genus: Hoplojana
- Species: H. indecisa

Binomial name
- Hoplojana indecisa Aurivillius, 1901

Species of moth

Hoplojana indecisa is a moth in the family Eupterotidae. It was described by Per Olof Christopher Aurivillius in 1901 and is found in Malawi and Tanzania.
