= Rhodopteriana funebris =

Scientific classification
- Kingdom: Animalia
- Phylum: Arthropoda
- Class: Insecta
- Order: Lepidoptera
- Family: Eupterotidae
- Genus: Rhodopteriana
- Species: R. funebris

Binomial name
- Rhodopteriana funebris (Rothschild, 1917)

Synonyms
- Jana funebris Gaede, 1927

Species of moth

Rhodopteriana funebris is a moth in the family Eupterotidae. It was described by Rothschild in 1917. It is found in Ethiopia.
