= Laelia fasciata =

Scientific classification
- Kingdom: Animalia
- Phylum: Arthropoda
- Class: Insecta
- Order: Lepidoptera
- Superfamily: Noctuoidea
- Family: Erebidae
- Genus: Laelia
- Species: L. fasciata

Binomial name
- Laelia fasciata (Moore, [1883])

Synonyms
- Laelioides fasciata Moore, [1883]; Procodeca testacea Moore, 1872; Laelioides rubripennis Moore, 1884

Species of moth

Laelia fasciata is a moth of the family Erebidae first described by Frederic Moore in 1883. It is found in Sri Lanka, India and Myanmar. One subspecies is recognized, Laelia fasciata rubripennis Moore, 1884.
