= Hoplojana purpurata =

Scientific classification
- Kingdom: Animalia
- Phylum: Arthropoda
- Class: Insecta
- Order: Lepidoptera
- Family: Eupterotidae
- Genus: Hoplojana
- Species: H. purpurata

Binomial name
- Hoplojana purpurata Wichgraf, 1921

Species of moth

Hoplojana purpurata is a moth in the family Eupterotidae. It is found in Sierra Leone.
