= Jana yokoana =

Scientific classification
- Kingdom: Animalia
- Phylum: Arthropoda
- Class: Insecta
- Order: Lepidoptera
- Family: Eupterotidae
- Genus: Jana
- Species: J. yokoana

Binomial name
- Jana yokoana (Bethune-Baker, 1927)

Synonyms
- Dreata yokoana Bethune-Baker, 1927

Species of moth

Jana yokoana is a moth in the family Eupterotidae. It was described by George Thomas Bethune-Baker in 1927. It is found in Cameroon.

The wingspan is about 118 mm. Both wings are brown, with a slight cinnamon tinge, the forewings with a median and a postmedian, dark brown transverse narrow stripe, slightly concave and almost parallel to each other. There are also traces of a clouding in the submarginal area. The hindwings are paler than the forewings, with a broad median and postmedian waved and irregular dark band right across the wing from the costa to the inner margin.
