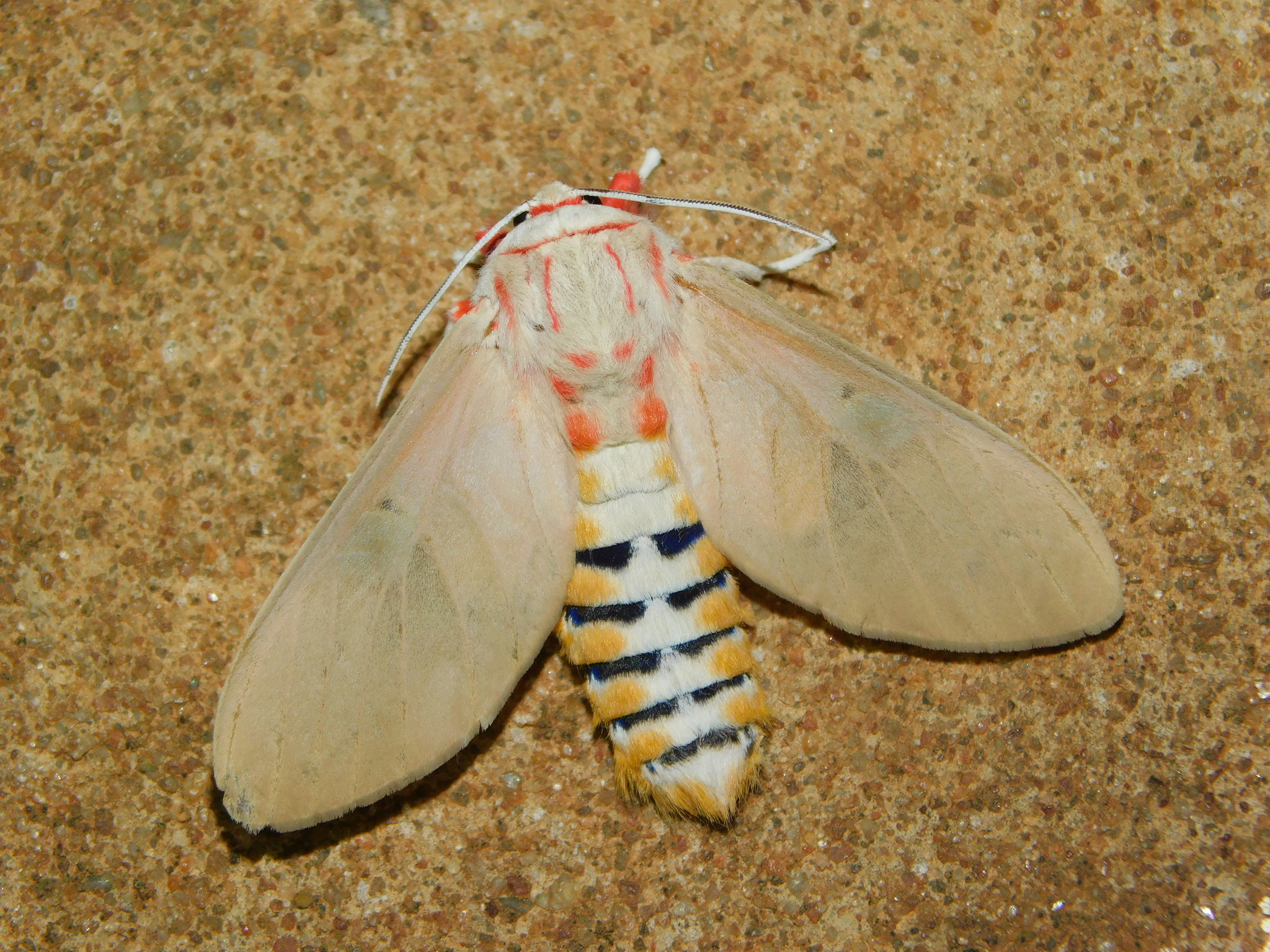
- Balacra herona

Scientific classification
- Kingdom: Animalia
- Phylum: Arthropoda
- Clade: Pancrustacea
- Class: Insecta
- Order: Lepidoptera
- Superfamily: Noctuoidea
- Family: Erebidae
- Subfamily: Arctiinae
- Tribe: Syntomini
- Genus: Balacra; Walker, 1856

Synonyms
- Pseudapiconoma Aurivillius, 1881; Lamprobalacra Kiriakoff, 1953; Compsochromia Kiriakoff, 1953; Daphaenisca Kiriakoff, 1953; Epibalacra Kiriakoff, 1957

= Balacra =

Genus of moths

Balacra is a genus of moths in the family Erebidae.

== Species ==
- Balacra affinis Rothschild, 1910
- Balacra alberici (Dufrane, 1945)
- Balacra aurivilliusi Kiriakoff, 1957
- Balacra basilewskyi Kiriakoff, 1953
- Balacra batesi Druce, 1910
- Balacra belga Kiriakoff, 1954
- Balacra brunnea Grünberg, 1907
- Balacra caeruleifascia Walker, 1856
- Balacra compsa Jordan, 1904
- Balacra conradti Oberthür, 1911
- Balacra daphaena Hampson, 1898
- Balacra diaphana Kiriakoff, 1957
- Balacra distincta Kiriakoff, 1953
- Balacra ehrmanni Holland, 1893
- Balacra elegans Aurivillius, 1892
- Balacra flava Przybylowicz, 2013
- Balacra flavimacula Walker, 1856
- Balacra fontainei Kiriakoff, 1953
- Balacra furva Hampson, 1911
- Balacra germana Rothschild, 1912
- Balacra guillemei (Oberthür, 1911)
- Balacra haemalea Holland, 1893
- Balacra herona Druce, 1887
- Balacra humphreyi Rothschild, 1912
- Balacra inflammata Hampson, 1914
- Balacra intermedia Rothschild, 1912
- Balacra jaensis Bethune-Baker, 1927
- Balacra magna Hulstaert, 1923
- Balacra micromacula Strand, 1920
- Balacra monotonia (Strand, 1912)
- Balacra nigripennis Aurivillius, 1904
- Balacra ochracea Walker, 1869
- Balacra preussi Aurivillius, 1904
- Balacra pulchra Aurivillius, 1892
- Balacra rattrayi Rothschild, 1910
- Balacra rubricincta Holland, 1893
- Balacra rubrostriata (Aurivillius, 1892)
- Balacra similis Hulstaert, 1923
- Balacra simplex Aurivillius, 1925
- Balacra simplicior Kiriakoff, 1957
- Balacra stigmatica Grünberg, 1907
- Balacra tamsi Kiriakoff, 1957
- Balacra testacea Aurivillius, 1881
- Balacra umbra Druce, 1910
- Balacra vitreata Rothschild, 1910
- Balacra vitreigutta Hulstaert, 1923
