= Balacra daphaena =

Scientific classification
- Kingdom: Animalia
- Phylum: Arthropoda
- Class: Insecta
- Order: Lepidoptera
- Superfamily: Noctuoidea
- Family: Erebidae
- Subfamily: Arctiinae
- Genus: Balacra
- Species: B. daphaena

Binomial name
- Balacra daphaena (Hampson, 1898)

Synonyms
- Pseudacpiconoma daphaena Hampson, 1898

Species of moth

Balacra daphaena is a moth of the family Erebidae. It was described by George Hampson in 1898. It is found in Angola, Cameroon, the Republic of the Congo, the Democratic Republic of the Congo, Niger and Nigeria.
