= Jana jeanae =

Scientific classification
- Kingdom: Animalia
- Phylum: Arthropoda
- Class: Insecta
- Order: Lepidoptera
- Family: Eupterotidae
- Genus: Jana
- Species: J. jeanae

Binomial name
- Jana jeanae Stoneham, 1966

Species of moth

Jana jeanae is a moth in the family Eupterotidae. It was described by Stoneham in 1966. It is found in Southern Africa.
