= Rhodopteriana obscura =

Scientific classification
- Kingdom: Animalia
- Phylum: Arthropoda
- Class: Insecta
- Order: Lepidoptera
- Family: Eupterotidae
- Genus: Rhodopteriana
- Species: R. obscura

Binomial name
- Rhodopteriana obscura (Aurivillius, 1893)

Synonyms
- Jana obscura Aurivillius, 1893

Species of moth

Rhodopteriana obscura is a moth in the family Eupterotidae. It was described by Per Olof Christopher Aurivillius in 1893. It is found in the Democratic Republic of the Congo and Ghana.
