= Balacra affinis =

Scientific classification
- Kingdom: Animalia
- Phylum: Arthropoda
- Clade: Pancrustacea
- Class: Insecta
- Order: Lepidoptera
- Superfamily: Noctuoidea
- Family: Erebidae
- Subfamily: Arctiinae
- Genus: Balacra
- Species: B. affinis

Binomial name
- Balacra affinis (Rothschild, 1910)

Synonyms
- Pseudapiconoma affinis Rothschild, 1910

Species of moth

Balacra affinis is a moth of the family Erebidae. It was described by Rothschild in 1910. It is found in Cameroon and the Democratic Republic of Congo.
