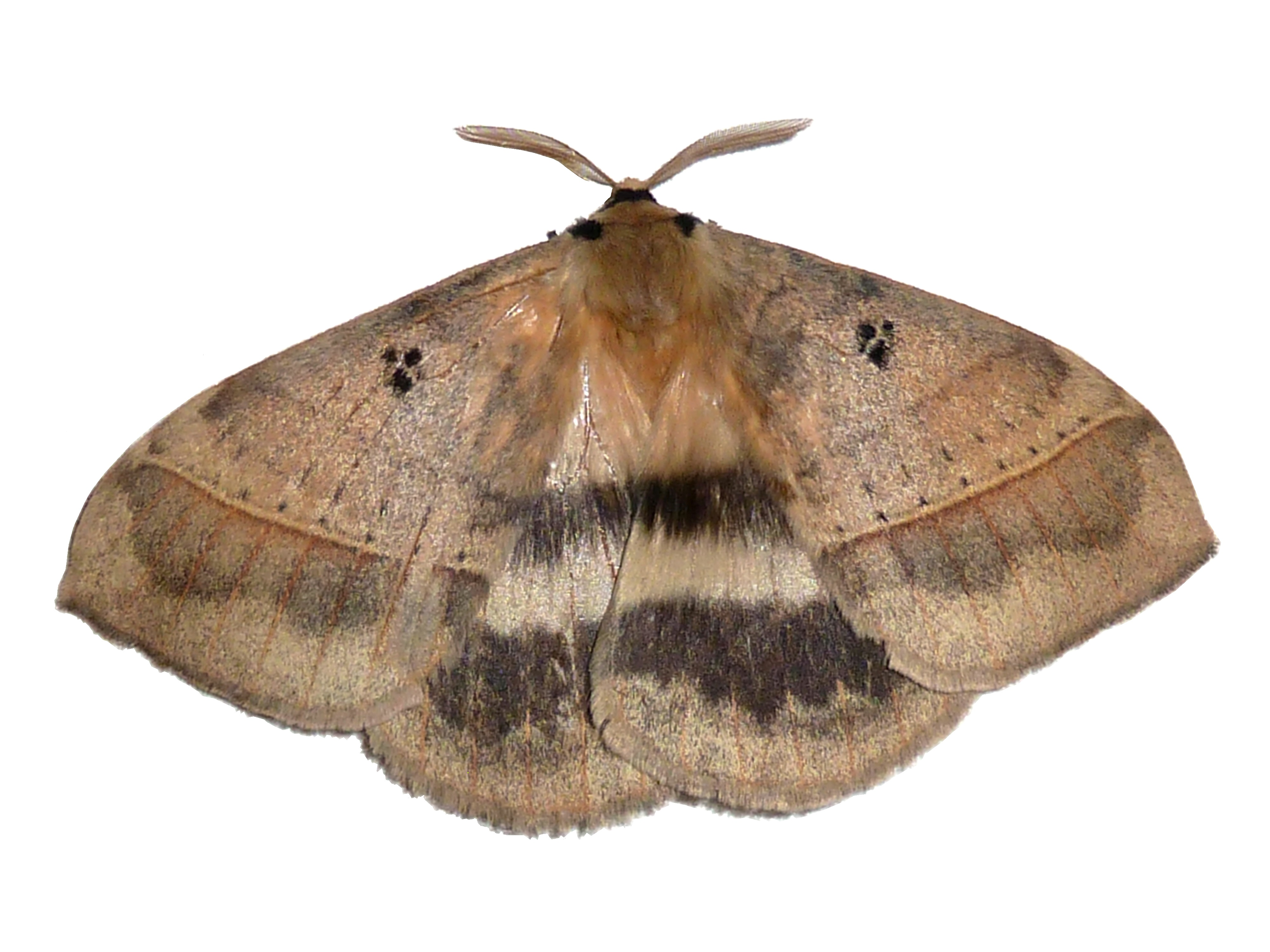

Scientific classification
- Kingdom: Animalia
- Phylum: Arthropoda
- Class: Insecta
- Order: Lepidoptera
- Family: Eupterotidae
- Genus: Jana
- Species: J. eurymas

Binomial name
- Jana eurymas Herrich-Schäffer, 1854

= Jana eurymas =

Species of moth

Jana eurymas, the banded monkey, is a moth in the family Eupterotidae. It was described by Gottlieb August Wilhelm Herrich-Schäffer in 1854. It is found in Cameroon, the Republic of the Congo, the Democratic Republic of the Congo, Ghana, Guinea, Kenya, Namibia, Sierra Leone, South Africa, Tanzania and Zambia.

The larvae feed Canthium species and Psydrax obovata.
