= Balacra rubrostriata =

Scientific classification
- Domain: Eukaryota
- Kingdom: Animalia
- Phylum: Arthropoda
- Class: Insecta
- Order: Lepidoptera
- Superfamily: Noctuoidea
- Family: Erebidae
- Subfamily: Arctiinae
- Genus: Balacra
- Species: B. rubrostriata

Binomial name
- Balacra rubrostriata (Aurivillius, 1898)

Synonyms
- Metarctia rubrostriata Aurivillius, 1898

Species of moth

Balacra rubrostriata is a moth of the family Erebidae. It was described by Per Olof Christopher Aurivillius in 1898 and is found in Burundi, Cameroon, the Democratic Republic of the Congo, Gabon, Ghana, Kenya, Togo, Uganda and Zambia.
