= Jana tripunctata =

Scientific classification
- Kingdom: Animalia
- Phylum: Arthropoda
- Class: Insecta
- Order: Lepidoptera
- Family: Eupterotidae
- Genus: Jana
- Species: J. tripunctata

Binomial name
- Jana tripunctata Aurivillius, 1897

Synonyms
- Hoplojana tripunctata

Species of moth

Jana tripunctata is a moth in the family Eupterotidae. It was described by Per Olof Christopher Aurivillius in 1897 and is found in Malawi.
