= Rhodopteriana soricis =

Scientific classification
- Kingdom: Animalia
- Phylum: Arthropoda
- Class: Insecta
- Order: Lepidoptera
- Family: Eupterotidae
- Genus: Rhodopteriana
- Species: R. soricis

Binomial name
- Rhodopteriana soricis (Rothschild, 1917)

Synonyms
- Hoplojana soricis Rothschild, 1917

Species of moth

Rhodopteriana soricis is a moth in the family Eupterotidae. It was described by Rothschild in 1917. It is found in Ghana and Sierra Leone.
