= Rhodopteriana abyssinica =

Scientific classification
- Kingdom: Animalia
- Phylum: Arthropoda
- Class: Insecta
- Order: Lepidoptera
- Family: Eupterotidae
- Genus: Rhodopteriana
- Species: R. abyssinica

Binomial name
- Rhodopteriana abyssinica (Rothschild, 1917)

Synonyms
- Hoplojana abyssinica Rothschild, 1917; Hoplojana abyssinia Berio, 1939

Species of moth

Rhodopteriana abyssinica is a moth in the family Eupterotidae. It was described by Rothschild in 1917. It is found in Eritrea and Ethiopia.
