= Cyperus digitatus =

Conservation status
- Least Concern (IUCN 3.1)

- Priority One — Poorly Known Taxa (DEC)

Scientific classification
- Kingdom: Plantae
- Clade: Tracheophytes
- Clade: Angiosperms
- Clade: Monocots
- Clade: Commelinids
- Order: Poales
- Family: Cyperaceae
- Genus: Cyperus
- Species: C. digitatus

Binomial name
- Cyperus digitatus Roxb.

Species of plant

Cyperus digitatus, also known as finger flatsedge in the United States, and chang xiao sui suo cao in China, is a sedge of the family Cyperaceae that is native to tropical and subtropical areas of Africa, Asia, the Americas and Australia.

== Description ==
The grass like sedge typically grows to a height of 1 metre (3.3 ft). The perennial sedge has short woody rhizomes and tufted smooth culms with a triangular cross-section that grow to a height of 0.5 to 1.5 m (1 ft 8 in to 4 ft 11 in). The leaves below are nearly the same length as the culms and have brown to purple coloured sheaths. The sub-leathery, flat to folded leaf blade has a width of 4 to 15 mm (0.16 to 0.59 in). It form as inflorescence with six to ten rays that have a length up to 18 cm (7.1 in) and have four to seven raylets that have cylindrical spikes that are 3 to 6 cm (1.2 to 2.4 in) long and 0.2 to 2 cm (0.079 to 0.787 in) wide.

== Taxonomy ==
The species was first described by the botanist William Roxburgh in 1820 as a part of the work Flora Indica; or descriptions of Indian Plants. The type specimen was collected by Roxburgh in India. It has ten synonyms including; Cyperus bourgaei, Cyperus digitatus var. laxiflorus, Cyperus digitatus var. pingbienensis and Cyperus mexicanus.

== Distribution ==
In Asia the renge of the plant extends from Pakistan in the west to the eastern sea board of China in the east and extends doen through most of Malesia. In Australia is found in creek beds and other damp areas in a small area in the Kimberley region of Western Australia as well as other northern tropical parts of the Northern Territory and Queensland. In the Americas it is found as far north as Texas with the range extending south through Central America and into South America as far south as Argentina. In Africa it is found as far north as Egypt south through the rest of the continent to Botswana.

== See also ==
- List of Cyperus species
