= Asura mutabilis =

Scientific classification
- Domain: Eukaryota
- Kingdom: Animalia
- Phylum: Arthropoda
- Class: Insecta
- Order: Lepidoptera
- Superfamily: Noctuoidea
- Family: Erebidae
- Subfamily: Arctiinae
- Genus: Asura
- Species: A. mutabilis

Binomial name
- Asura mutabilis Kühne, 2007

Synonyms
- Tumicla mutabilis (Kühne, 2007)

Species of moth

Asura mutabilis is a moth of the family Erebidae. It was described by Lars Kühne in 2007. It is found in Burundi, the Democratic Republic of the Congo, Uganda, Tanzania and Kenya.
