= Rhodopteriana distincta =

Scientific classification
- Kingdom: Animalia
- Phylum: Arthropoda
- Class: Insecta
- Order: Lepidoptera
- Family: Eupterotidae
- Genus: Rhodopteriana
- Species: R. distincta

Binomial name
- Rhodopteriana distincta (Rothschild, 1917)

Synonyms
- Hoplojana distincta Rothschild, 1917

Species of moth

Rhodopteriana distincta is a moth in the family Eupterotidae. It was described by Rothschild in 1917.

== Distribution ==
It is found in the Democratic Republic of Congo, Eritrea, Rwanda and Tanzania.
