= Jana nigrorufa =

Scientific classification
- Kingdom: Animalia
- Phylum: Arthropoda
- Class: Insecta
- Order: Lepidoptera
- Family: Eupterotidae
- Genus: Jana
- Species: J. nigrorufa

Binomial name
- Jana nigrorufa Berger, 1980

Synonyms
- Jana tripunctata nigrorufa Berger, 1980; Hoplojana nigrorufa

Species of moth

Jana nigrorufa is a moth in the family Eupterotidae. It was described by Lucien A. Berger in 1980. It is found in Burundi.
