= Jabaina =

Scientific classification
- Domain: Eukaryota
- Kingdom: Animalia
- Phylum: Arthropoda
- Class: Insecta
- Order: Lepidoptera
- Superfamily: Noctuoidea
- Family: Erebidae
- Subfamily: Lymantriinae
- Genus: Jabaina; Griveaud, 1976

Genus of moths

Jabaina is a genus of moths in the subfamily Lymantriinae. The genus was erected by Paul Griveaud in 1976.

== Species ==
Some species of this genus are:

- Jabaina albimacula Griveaud, 1977
- Jabaina ania (Hering, 1926)
- Jabaina apicimacula Griveaud, 1977
- Jabaina betschi Griveaud, 1977
- Jabaina cowani Griveaud, 1977
- Jabaina gutierrezi Griveaud, 1977
- Jabaina hiaraka Griveaud, 1977
- Jabaina ithystropha (Collenette, 1939)
- Jabaina lakato Griveaud, 1977
- Jabaina sakaraha (Collenette, 1959)
- Jabaina sogai Griveaud, 1977
- Jabaina uteles (Collenette, 1936)
