= Jana rustica =

Scientific classification
- Kingdom: Animalia
- Phylum: Arthropoda
- Class: Insecta
- Order: Lepidoptera
- Family: Eupterotidae
- Genus: Jana
- Species: J. rustica

Binomial name
- Jana rustica Strand, 1911

Synonyms
- Hoplojana rustica

Species of moth

Jana rustica is a moth in the family Eupterotidae. It was described by Embrik Strand in 1911. It is found in Tanzania.
