= Robert Gschwandner =

Austrian entomologist (1875–1927)

Robert Gschwandner (19 December 1875, in Hernals, Vienna – 14 May 1927, in Vienna) was an Austrian entomologist.

Gschwandner was a specialist in Saturniidae. He was a friend of Hans Rebel, then the Director of the Naturhistorisches Museum in Vienna. His collections were bequeathed to the museum.
