= Rhodopteriana roseobrunnea =

Scientific classification
- Kingdom: Animalia
- Phylum: Arthropoda
- Class: Insecta
- Order: Lepidoptera
- Family: Eupterotidae
- Genus: Rhodopteriana
- Species: R. roseobrunnea

Binomial name
- Rhodopteriana roseobrunnea (Rothschild, 1917)

Synonyms
- Hoplojana roseobrunnea Rothschild, 1917

Species of moth

Rhodopteriana roseobrunnea is a moth in the family Eupterotidae. It was described by Rothschild in 1917. It is found in Kenya and Uganda.
