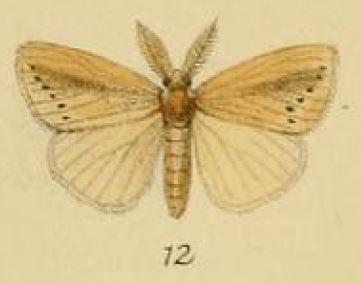

Scientific classification
- Domain: Eukaryota
- Kingdom: Animalia
- Phylum: Arthropoda
- Class: Insecta
- Order: Lepidoptera
- Superfamily: Noctuoidea
- Family: Erebidae
- Genus: Laelia
- Species: L. fracta

Binomial name
- Laelia fracta Schaus & Clements, 1893

Synonyms
- Laelia eos Hering, 1926

= Laelia fracta =

Species of moth

Laelia fracta is a species of moth of the family Erebidae described by William Schaus and W. G. Clements in 1893.

== Distribution ==
It is found in Burundi, Cameroon, the Democratic Republic of the Congo, Ghana, Kenya, Sierra Leone, South Africa and Tanzania.
