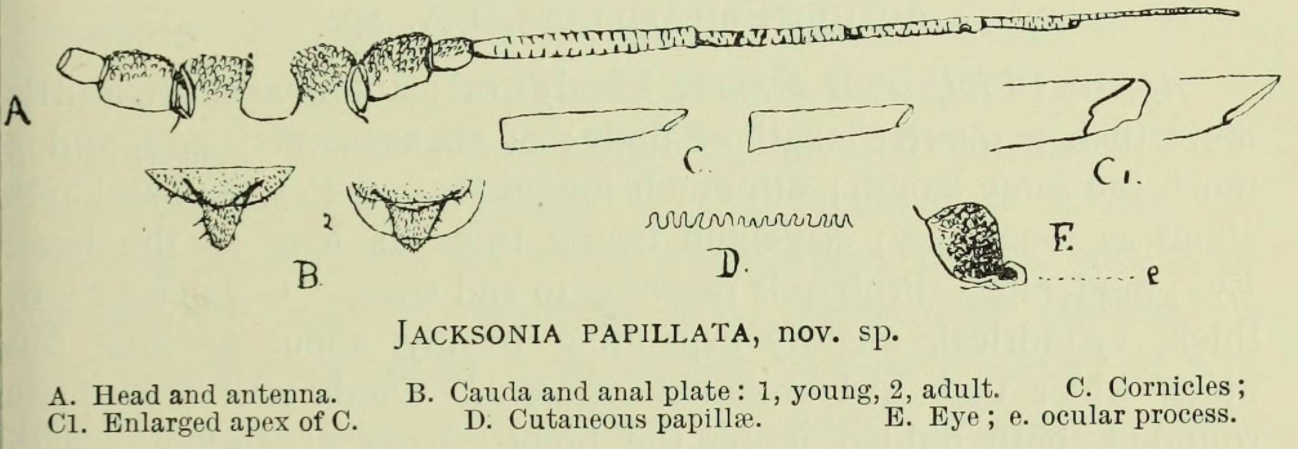
- from Theobald, 1923

Scientific classification
- Domain: Eukaryota
- Kingdom: Animalia
- Phylum: Arthropoda
- Class: Insecta
- Order: Hemiptera
- Suborder: Sternorrhyncha
- Family: Aphididae
- Genus: Jacksonia; Theobald, 1923

Type species
- Jacksonia papillata Theobald, 1923

= Jacksonia (bug) =

Genus of insects

Jacksonia is a genus of true bugs belonging to the family Aphididae.

The species of this genus are found in Europe and Northern America. The genus was first described by Frederick Vincent Theobald in 1923.

Species:

- Jacksonia gibbera Qiao, Xingyi Li, Bin Zhang & Xiaomei Su, 2013
- Jacksonia papillata Theobald, 1923
