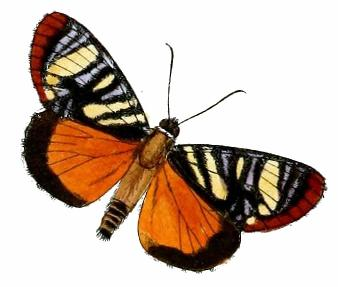

Scientific classification
- Kingdom: Animalia
- Phylum: Arthropoda
- Clade: Pancrustacea
- Class: Insecta
- Order: Lepidoptera
- Superfamily: Noctuoidea
- Family: Noctuidae
- Genus: Polacanthopoda
- Species: P. tigrina

Binomial name
- Polacanthopoda tigrina (H. Druce, 1882)

Synonyms
- Aegocera tigrina (H. Druce, 1882); Hespagarista tigrina Druce, 1882; Mitrophrys fabricata Karsch, 1895; Rothia contigua Hampson, 1901; Aegocera tigrina f. casteneimargo Jordan, 1913; Aegocera tigrina f. nigrimargo Jordan, 1913; Aegocera tigrina ab. albifascia Jordan, 1913; Aegocera tigrina ab. flavifascia Jordan, 1913; Polacanthopoda tigrina latimargo Kiriakoff, 1975; Polacanthopoda tigrina orientalis Kiriakoff, 1975

= Polacanthopoda tigrina =

Species of moth

Polacanthopoda tigrina is a species of moth in the family Noctuidae first described by Herbert Druce in 1882. It is found in Cameroon, the Republic of Congo, the Democratic Republic of Congo, Gabon, Ghana, Guinea, Nigeria and Uganda.

== Description ==
The forewings are black and the outer margin reddish brown. There are two yellowish white bands close to the base, a white streak at the end of the cell and beyond it a wide yellowish-white band broken into two small spots at the anal angle. Between these are some transverse blue streaks. The hindwings are bright orange, with the outer margins broadly black. The fringe is black and white. The underside of the forewings is black, the base yellow, the white streak at the end of the cell and the band beyond are the same as on the upperside. The outer margin is brown. The underside of the hindwings is the same as the upperside, but the black outer margin is enclosed in a series of white spots.
