= Rhodopteriana rhodoptera =

Scientific classification
- Kingdom: Animalia
- Phylum: Arthropoda
- Class: Insecta
- Order: Lepidoptera
- Family: Eupterotidae
- Genus: Rhodopteriana
- Species: R. rhodoptera

Binomial name
- Rhodopteriana rhodoptera (Gerstaecker, 1871)

Synonyms
- Jana rhodoptera Gerstaecker, 1871; Hoplojana rhodoptera

Species of moth

Rhodopteriana rhodoptera is a moth in the family Eupterotidae. It was described by Carl Eduard Adolph Gerstaecker in 1871. It is found in Cameroon, the Democratic Republic of the Congo, Ethiopia, Gabon, Kenya, South Africa, Tanzania and Uganda.
