= Balacra rattrayi =

Scientific classification
- Domain: Eukaryota
- Kingdom: Animalia
- Phylum: Arthropoda
- Class: Insecta
- Order: Lepidoptera
- Superfamily: Noctuoidea
- Family: Erebidae
- Subfamily: Arctiinae
- Genus: Balacra
- Species: B. rattrayi

Binomial name
- Balacra rattrayi (Rothschild, 1910)

Synonyms
- Metapiconoma rattrayi Rothschild, 1910

Species of moth

Balacra rattrayi is a moth of the family Erebidae. It was described by Rothschild in 1910. It is found in Burundi, the Democratic Republic of Congo, Kenya, Rwanda and Uganda.
