= Rhodopteriana insignifica =

Scientific classification
- Kingdom: Animalia
- Phylum: Arthropoda
- Class: Insecta
- Order: Lepidoptera
- Family: Eupterotidae
- Genus: Rhodopteriana
- Species: R. insignifica

Binomial name
- Rhodopteriana insignifica (Rothschild, 1917)

Synonyms
- Hoplojana insignifica Rothschild, 1917

Species of moth

Rhodopteriana insignifica is a moth in the family Eupterotidae. It was described by Rothschild in 1917. It is found in the Democratic Republic of Congo.
