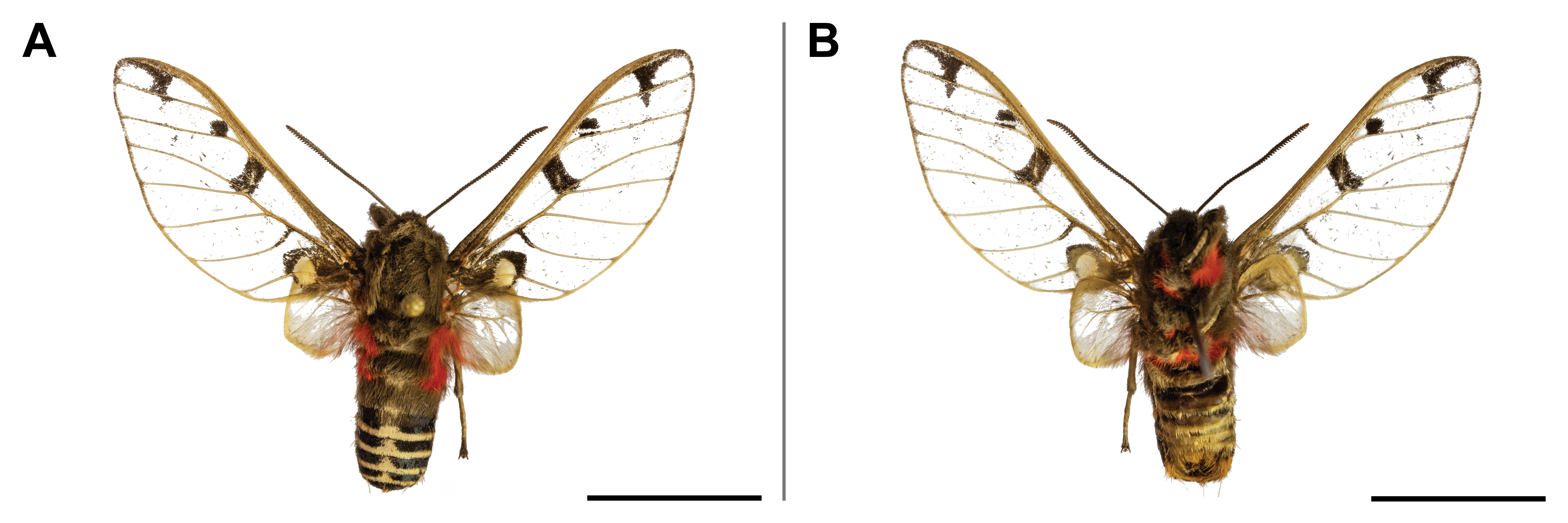

Scientific classification
- Domain: Eukaryota
- Kingdom: Animalia
- Phylum: Arthropoda
- Class: Insecta
- Order: Lepidoptera
- Superfamily: Noctuoidea
- Family: Erebidae
- Subfamily: Arctiinae
- Genus: Balacra
- Species: B. compsa

Binomial name
- Balacra compsa (Jordan, 1904)

Synonyms
- Pseudapiconoma compsa Jordan, 1904; Pseudapiconoma fenestrata Jordan, 1904; Pseudapiconoma melaena Hampson, 1905; Pseudapiconoma stigmatica Grünberg, 1907; Pseudapiconoma vitreata Rothschild, 1910

= Balacra compsa =

Species of moth

Balacra compsa is a moth of the family Erebidae. It was described by Karl Jordan in 1904. It is found in Angola, Burundi, the Democratic Republic of the Congo, Kenya, Rwanda and Uganda.
