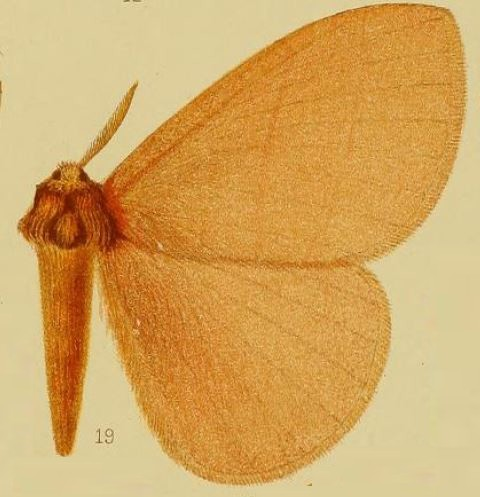

Scientific classification
- Kingdom: Animalia
- Phylum: Arthropoda
- Class: Insecta
- Order: Lepidoptera
- Family: Eupterotidae
- Genus: Rhodopteriana
- Species: R. anaemica

Binomial name
- Rhodopteriana anaemica (Hampson, 1910)

Synonyms
- Hoplojana anaemica Hampson, 1910

= Rhodopteriana anaemica =

Species of moth

Rhodopteriana anaemica is a moth in the family Eupterotidae. It was described by George Hampson in 1910. It is found in Zambia.
