= Jana roseata =

Scientific classification
- Kingdom: Animalia
- Phylum: Arthropoda
- Class: Insecta
- Order: Lepidoptera
- Family: Eupterotidae
- Genus: Jana
- Species: J. roseata

Binomial name
- Jana roseata Rothschild, 1917

Species of moth

Jana roseata is a moth in the family Eupterotidae. It was described by Rothschild in 1917. It is found in Burundi and Mozambique.

The wingspan is 130 mm for males and 120 mm for females. The forewings are salmon-pink strongly suffused with sooty-brown and a tripartite black stigma, an indistinct oblique subbasal and a more distinct oblique antemedian black band. There is also a curved black median and a straight postmedian black band. The hindwings are similar, but with a somewhat indistinct antemedian black band and a very broad postmedian band excised irregularly on the distal side.
