= Aegoceropsis fervida =

Scientific classification
- Kingdom: Animalia
- Phylum: Arthropoda
- Class: Insecta
- Order: Lepidoptera
- Superfamily: Noctuoidea
- Family: Noctuidae
- Genus: Aegoceropsis
- Species: A. fervida

Binomial name
- Aegoceropsis fervida (Walker, 1854)

Synonyms
- Aegocera fervida Walker, 1854; Aegocera triphaenoides Wallengren, 1860; Aegocera fimbria Möschler, 1872; Aegocera fervida fuscicosta Jordan, 1913; Aegocera fervida media Jordan, 1913

Species of moth

Aegoceropsis fervida is a species of moth from the genus Aegoceropsis. It is endemic to the central and southern regions of Africa, ranging from Ghana to Zimbabwe.
