= Gracilanja =

Scientific classification
- Kingdom: Animalia
- Phylum: Arthropoda
- Class: Insecta
- Order: Lepidoptera
- Family: Eupterotidae
- Subfamily: Janinae
- Genus: Gracilanja; Bouyer, 2011
- Species: G. gracilis

Binomial name
- Gracilanja gracilis (Walker, 1855)

Synonyms
- Gracilanja polymorpha Aurivillius, 1893; Jana gracilis Walker, 1855; Jana polymorpha Aurivillius, 1893; Jana gracilis f. grisea Berio, 1937; Jana gracilis f. rosea Berio, 1937

Genus of moths

Gracilanja is a monotypic moth genus in the family Eupterotidae erected by Thierry Bouyer in 2011. Its single species, Gracilanja gracilis, was described by Francis Walker in 1855. It is found in Cameroon, the Republic of the Congo, the Democratic Republic of the Congo, Equatorial Guinea, Ghana, Sierra Leone and Uganda.

Adults are pale fawn, the wings partly clouded with pale brown and with two oblique very slender nearly straight brown bands, which are most distinct on the forewings. The hindwings have a testaceous (terracotta color) undulating band between the outer brown band and the exterior border.
