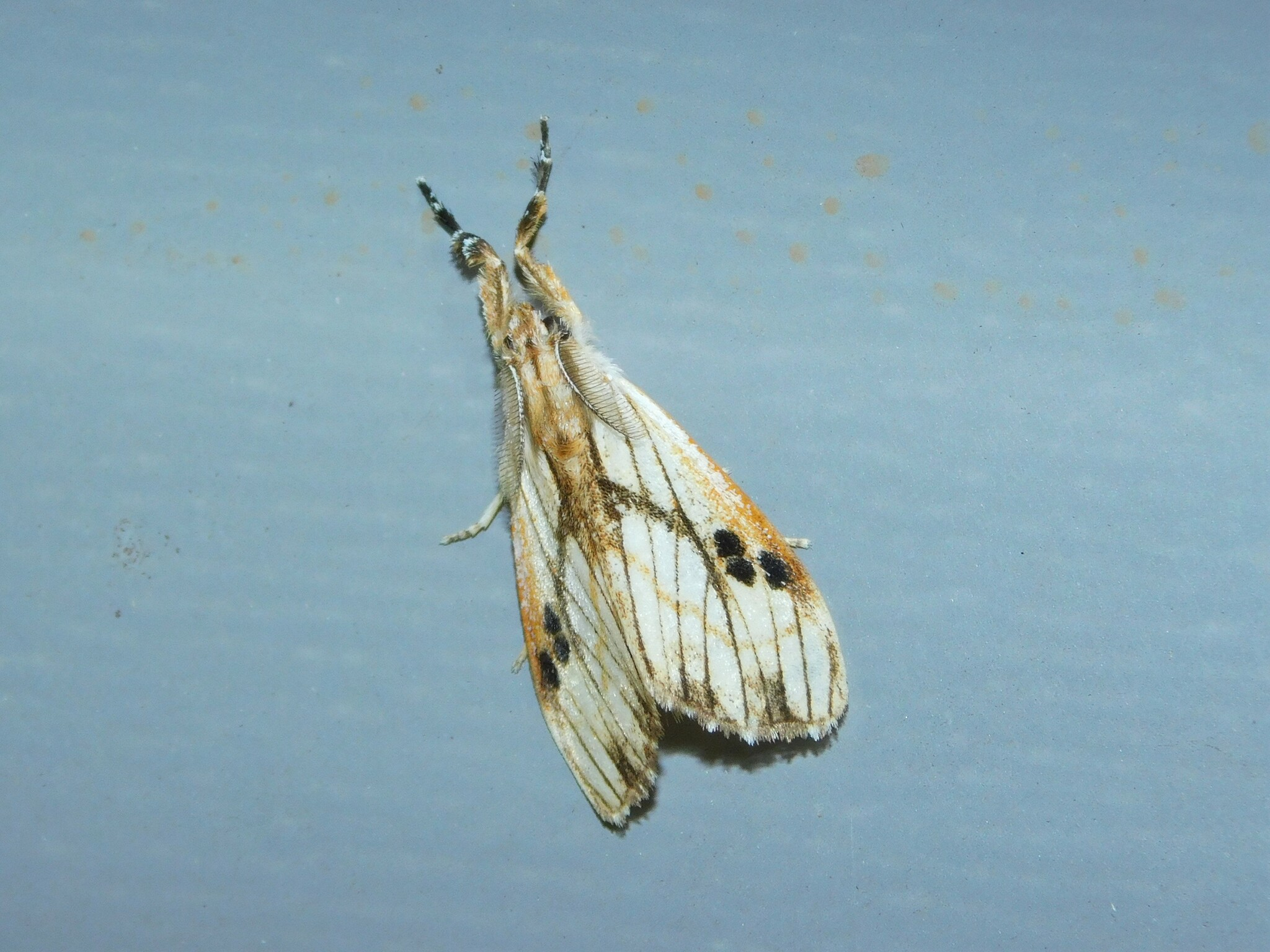

Scientific classification
- Kingdom: Animalia
- Phylum: Arthropoda
- Class: Insecta
- Order: Lepidoptera
- Superfamily: Noctuoidea
- Family: Erebidae
- Subfamily: Lymantriinae
- Genus: Jacksoniana; Nye, 1980
- Species: J. striata

Binomial name
- Jacksoniana striata (Collenette, 1937)

= Jacksoniana =

Genus of moths

Jacksoniana is a monotypic moth genus in the subfamily Lymantriinae described by Nye in 1980. Its only species, Jacksoniana striata, was first described by Cyril Leslie Collenette in 1937.
