= Owl moth =

Owl moth is a common name for various types of moths, mainly species in the family Brahmaeidae; it may refer to:

== Family Brahmaeidae ==
- Brahmaea certhia, the Sino-Korean owl moth
- Brahmaea europaea, the European owl moth
- Brahmaea japonica, the Japanese owl moth
- Brahmaea tancrei, the Siberian owl moth
- Brahmaea wallichii

== Other moth species ==
- Anticarsia irrorata
- Cometaster pyrula, the faint owl moth or yin-yang moth
- Thysania zenobia

== See also ==
- Owl butterfly
