= Lemonia strigata =

Scientific classification
- Kingdom: Animalia
- Phylum: Arthropoda
- Class: Insecta
- Order: Lepidoptera
- Family: Brahmaeidae
- Genus: Lemonia
- Species: L. strigata

Binomial name
- Lemonia strigata Rebel, 1910

Species of moth

Lemonia strigata is a moth in the family Brahmaeidae (older classifications placed it in Lemoniidae). It was described by Hans Rebel in 1910. It is also listed as a synonym of Lemonia taraxaci.
