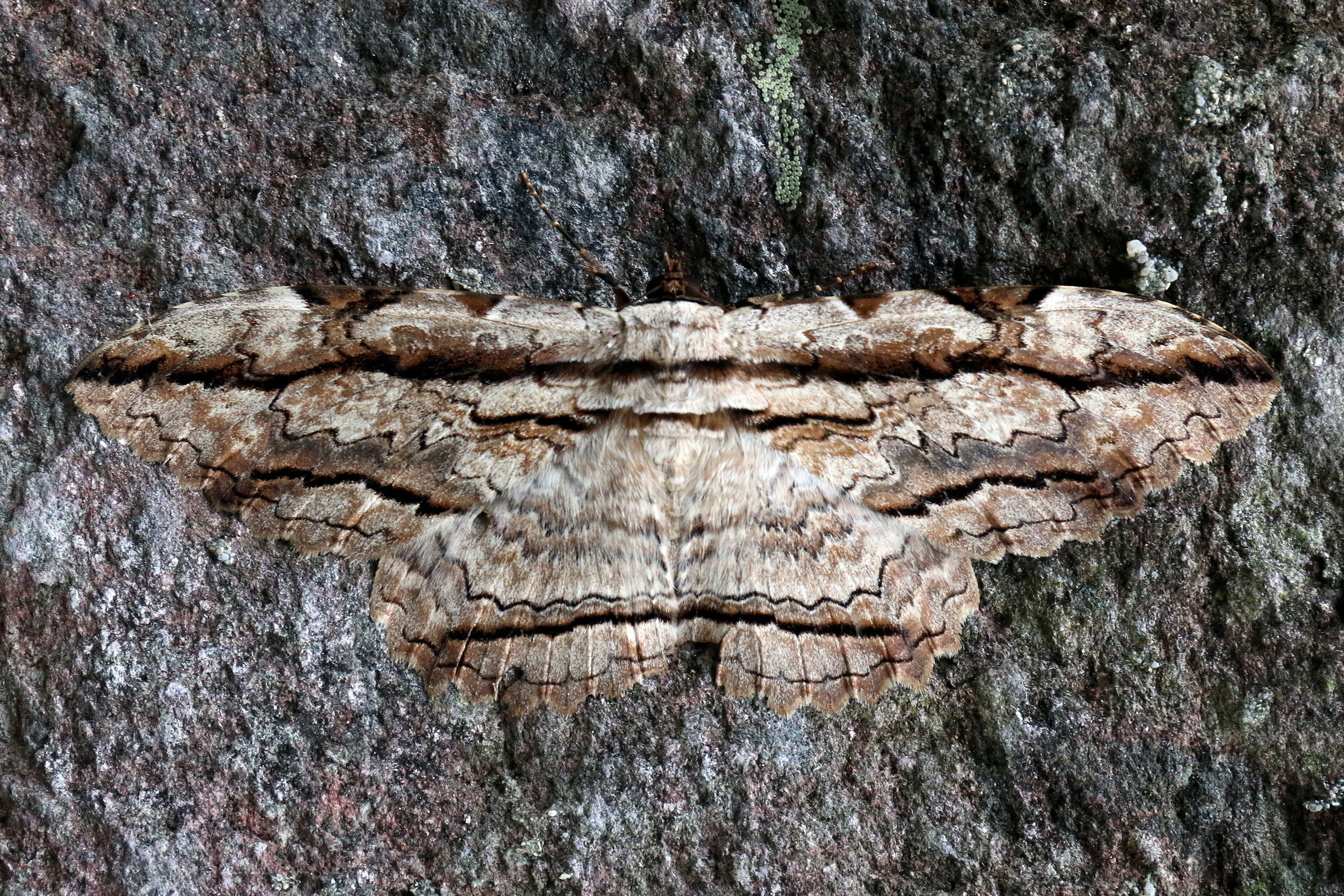
- In São Paulo, Brazil

Scientific classification
- Domain: Eukaryota
- Kingdom: Animalia
- Phylum: Arthropoda
- Class: Insecta
- Order: Lepidoptera
- Superfamily: Noctuoidea
- Family: Erebidae
- Genus: Thysania
- Species: T. zenobia

Binomial name
- Thysania zenobia (Cramer, 1776)

Synonyms
- Phalaena zenobia Cramer, [1777]

= Thysania zenobia =

Species of moth

Thysania zenobia, the owl moth, is a species of moth in the family Erebidae. The species was first described by Pieter Cramer in 1776, and is native to North and South America and the Caribbean.

== Description ==
Upperside: Antennae setaceous and dark brown. Head the same. Thorax and abdomen grey: having a tuft of black hairs standing between them. General colour grey, faintly tinged with red. Anterior wings with a remarkable irregular black bar running from the tips to the shoulders, crossing the thorax horizontally, and parallel with the anterior edges; on the middle of this edge is a triangular dark brown spot edged with black, and nearer the body is a smaller one of the same shape and colour: a second narrower black line is situate about half an inch below, and parallel with the first, rising on the posterior edges, and extending across the wings almost to the external ones. Posterior wings with a black irregular bar arising near the external corners, and crossing them in a straight direction, meeting at the extremity of the abdomen; just above this, and almost close to it, is a very small and narrow waved black line running parallel with it, but towards the end suddenly turns off, and reaches the anterior edges. Besides the above markings there are a number of lighter and darker shades interspersed on the different parts of the wings.

Underside: Palpi reddish, the extremities brown. Tongue spiral. Legs dark brown, mottled with red. Breast, abdomen, and sides red. Wings greyish red, with black indented lines and bars running parallel with the edges of the wings, and regularly placed one above another. Anterior wings having a black spot near their centre shaped like a kidney bean, with a small round one at a little distance nearer the body. Posterior having likewise a small black spot about half an inch from the base. Margins of the wings rather deeply scolloped. Wingspan 5 1/2inches (140 mm).

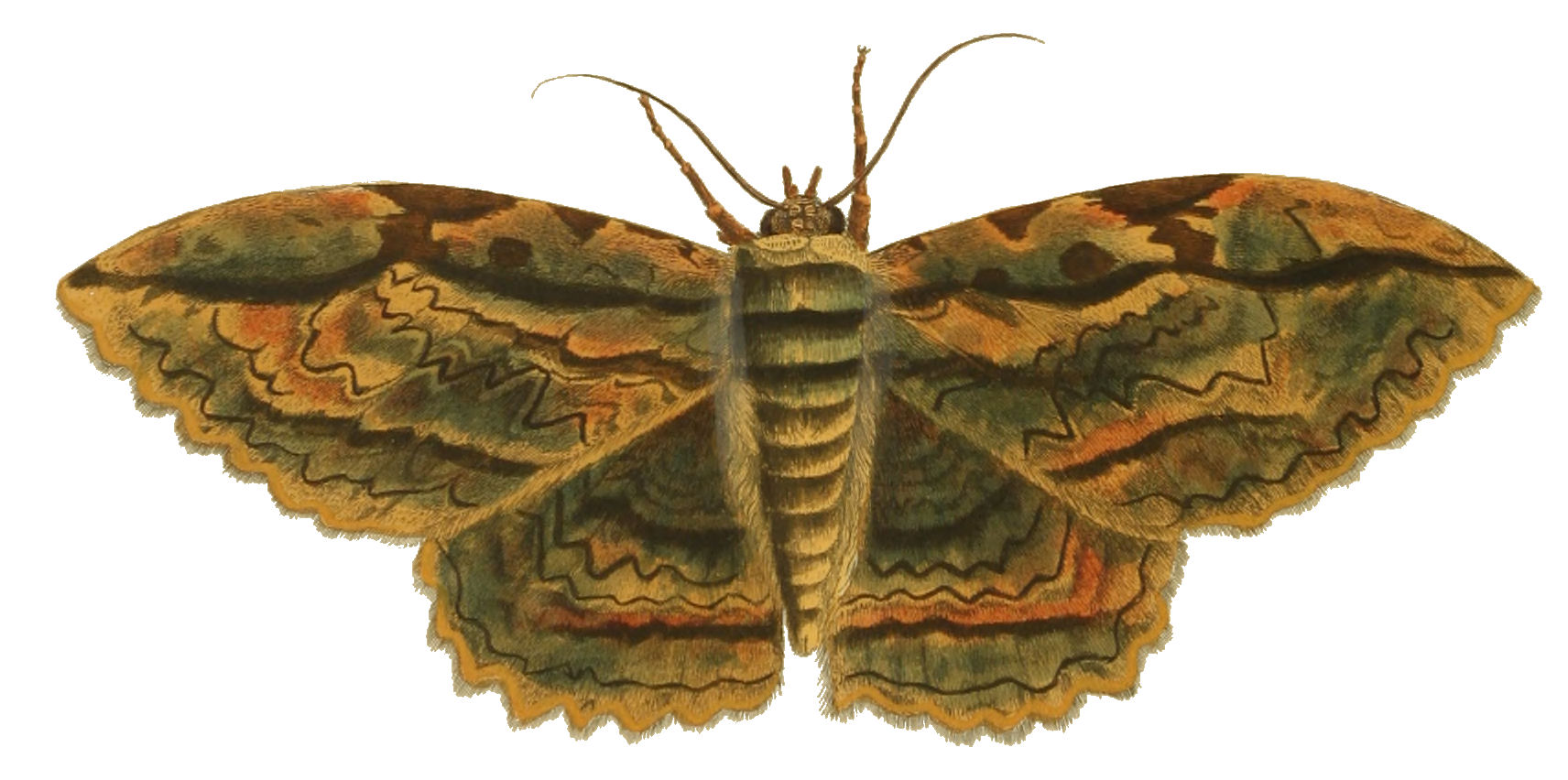
Illustration by Dru Drury
dorsal

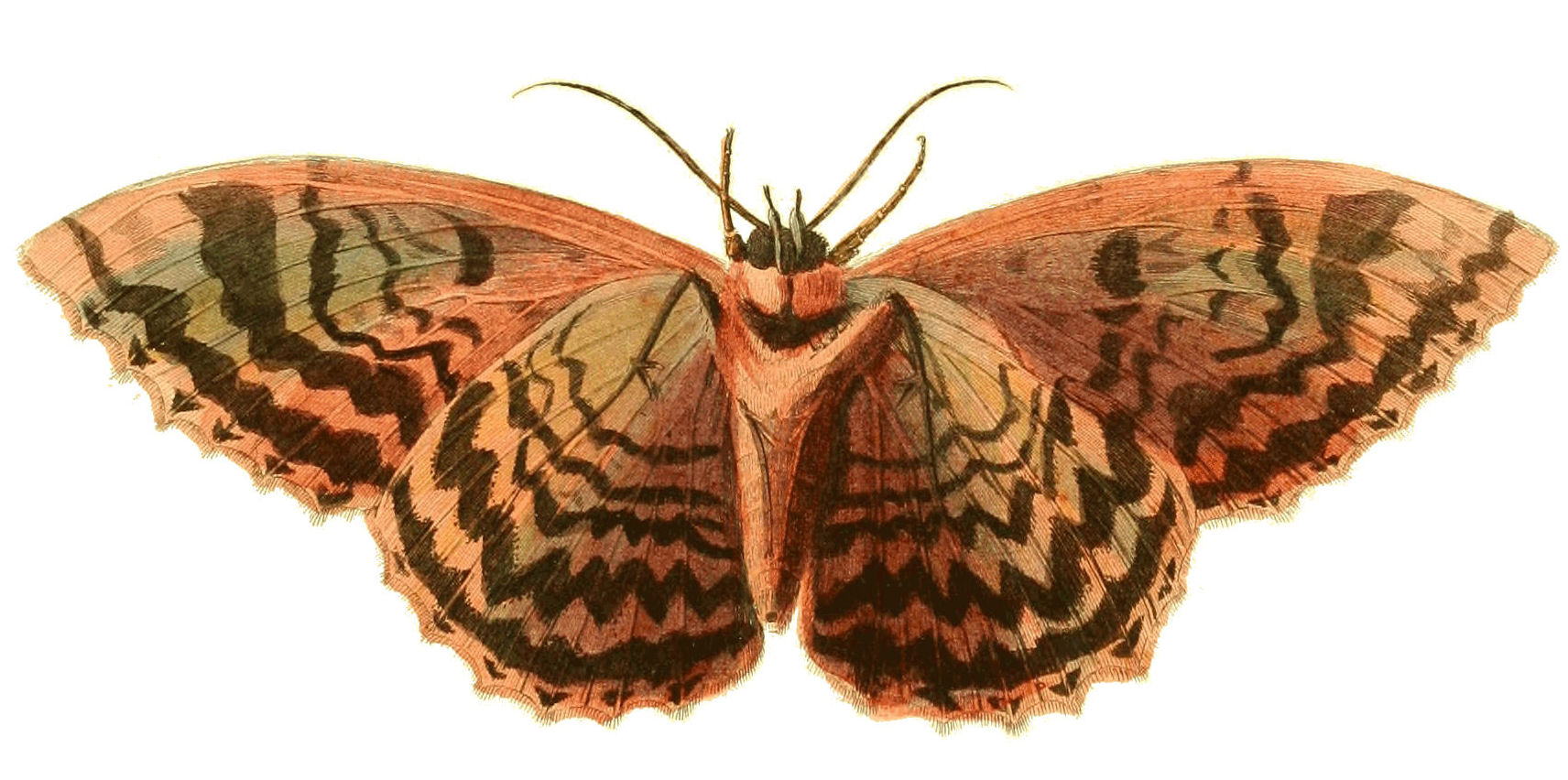
Illustration by Dru Drury
ventral

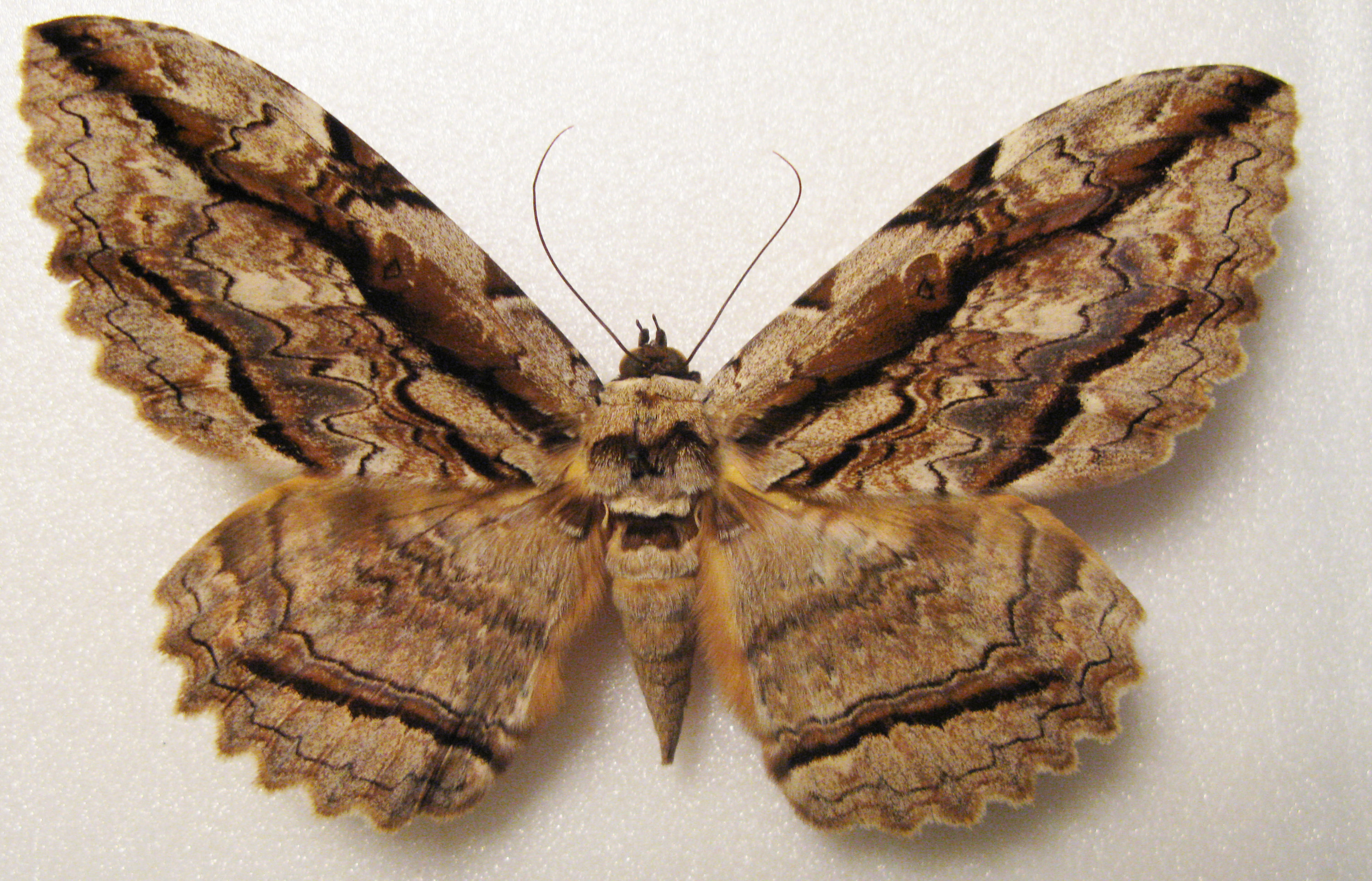
Mounted male

== See also ==
Other moths which are called "owl moth" include:

- Acanthobrahmaea europaea – European owl moth
- Anticarsia irrorata – owl moth of the Old World tropics
- Brahmaea certhia – Sino-Korean owl moth
- Brahmaea japonica – Japanese owl moth
