= Lemonia ballioni =

Scientific classification
- Kingdom: Animalia
- Phylum: Arthropoda
- Class: Insecta
- Order: Lepidoptera
- Family: Brahmaeidae
- Genus: Lemonia
- Species: L. ballioni

Binomial name
- Lemonia ballioni (Christoph, 1888)

Synonyms
- Crateronyx ballioni Christoph, 1888

Species of moth

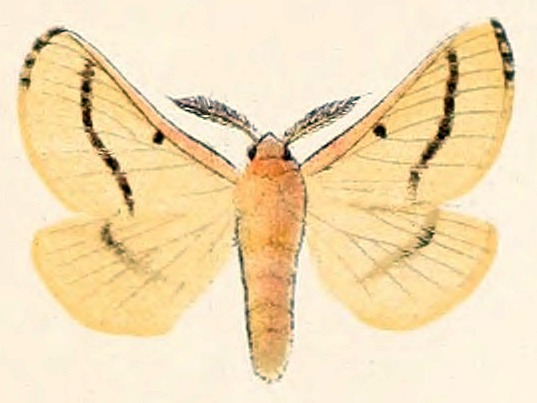

Lemonia ballioni is a species of moth of the family Brahmaeidae (older classifications placed it in Lemoniidae). It was described by Hugo Theodor Christoph in 1888. The range includes Turkey, Ukraine and Russia.
