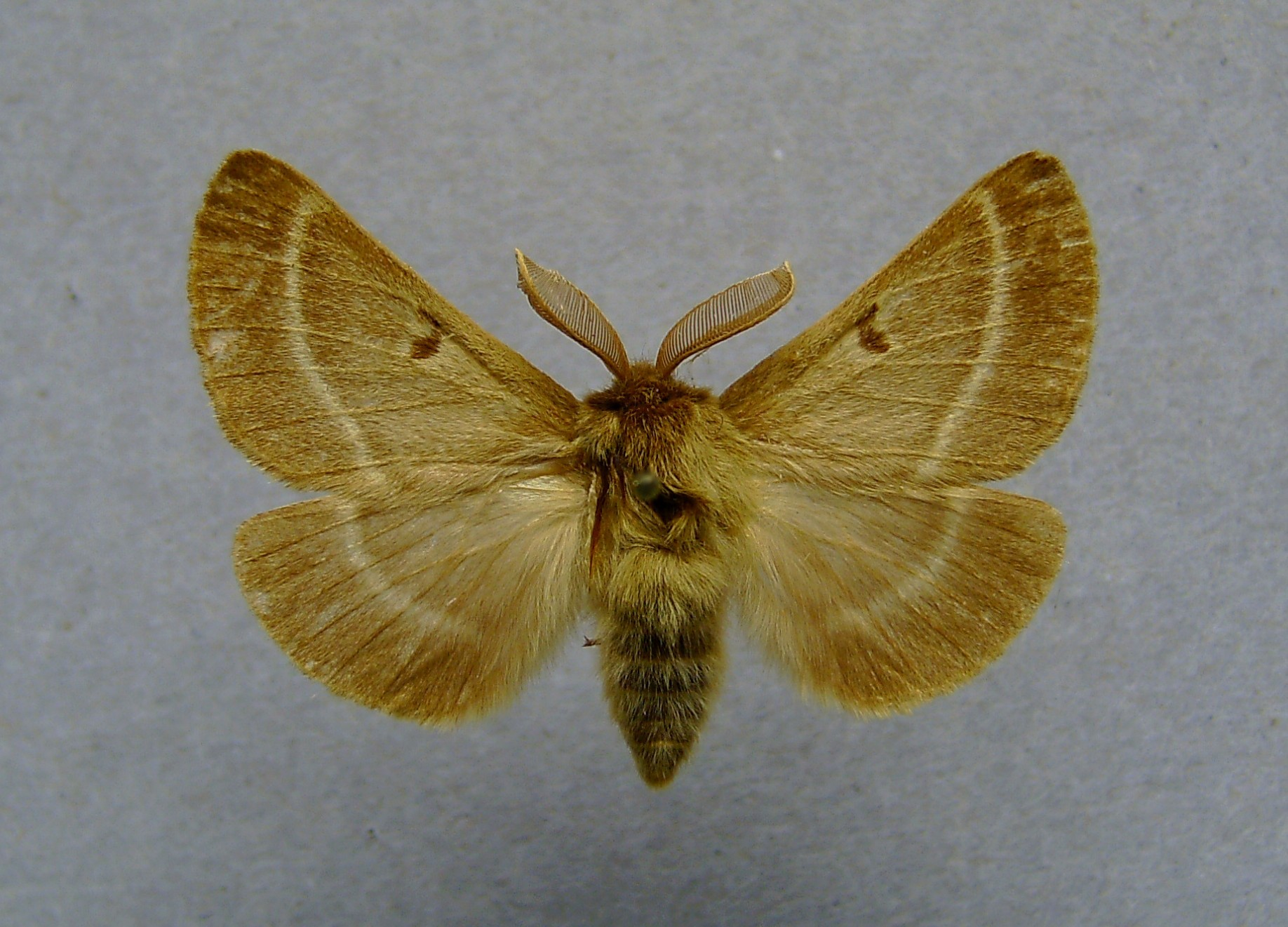

Scientific classification
- Kingdom: Animalia
- Phylum: Arthropoda
- Class: Insecta
- Order: Lepidoptera
- Family: Brahmaeidae
- Genus: Lemonia
- Species: L. balcanica

Binomial name
- Lemonia balcanica (Herrich-Schäffer, 1847)

Synonyms
- Lasiocampa balcanica Herrich-Schäffer, 1847; Lemonia brunneomarginata Wagner, 1931

= Lemonia balcanica =

Species of moth

Lemonia balcanica is a species of moth of the family Brahmaeidae (older classifications placed it in Lemoniidae). It is found in the Balkans.

The wingspan is 35–50 millimetres (1.4–2.0 in). The moth flies from September to October depending on the location.

The larvae feed on Taraxacum, Leontodon and Hieracium species.

== Subspecies ==
- Lemonia balcanica anatolica Wagner, 1931
- Lemonia balcanica balcanica
- Lemonia balcanica bremeri (Koleanti, 1846)
- Lemonia balcanica cis Zolotuhin, 1994
- Lemonia balcanica vashlovani Didmanidze, 1980

== Sources ==
- P.C.-Rougeot, P. Viette (1978). Guide des papillons nocturnes d'Europe et d'Afrique du Nord. Delachaux et Niestlé (Lausanne).
