= Dactyloceras richinii =

Scientific classification
- Kingdom: Animalia
- Phylum: Arthropoda
- Class: Insecta
- Order: Lepidoptera
- Family: Brahmaeidae
- Genus: Dactyloceras
- Species: D. richinii

Binomial name
- Dactyloceras richinii Berio, 1940

Species of moth

Dactyloceras richinii is a moth in the family Brahmaeidae. It was described by Emilio Berio in 1940 and is found in Eritrea.
