= Lemonia sacrosancta =

Scientific classification
- Kingdom: Animalia
- Phylum: Arthropoda
- Class: Insecta
- Order: Lepidoptera
- Family: Brahmaeidae
- Genus: Lemonia
- Species: L. sacrosancta

Binomial name
- Lemonia sacrosancta Püngeler, 1902

Species of moth

Lemonia sacrosancta is a moth in the family Brahmaeidae (older classifications placed it in Lemoniidae). It was described by Rudolf Püngeler in 1902.
