= Lemonia philopalus =

Scientific classification
- Kingdom: Animalia
- Phylum: Arthropoda
- Class: Insecta
- Order: Lepidoptera
- Family: Brahmaeidae
- Genus: Lemonia
- Species: L. philopalus

Binomial name
- Lemonia philopalus (Donzel, 1842)

Synonyms
- Bombyx philopalus Donzel, 1842; Lemonia phantasma Marten, 1955

Species of moth

Lemonia philopalus is a species of moth of the family Brahmaeidae (older classifications placed it in Lemoniidae). It is found from Spain up to Egypt and North Africa.

The wingspan is 50–65 millimetres (2.0–2.6 in). The moth flies from October to February depending on the location.

The larvae feed on Hieracium and Sonchus species.

== Subspecies ==
- Lemonia philopalus philopalus
- Lemonia philopalus vasquezi Oberthür, 1916

== Sources ==
- P.C.-Rougeot, P. Viette (1978). Guide des papillons nocturnes d'Europe et d'Afrique du Nord. Delachaux et Niestlé (Lausanne).
