= Dactyloceras murphyi =

Scientific classification
- Kingdom: Animalia
- Phylum: Arthropoda
- Class: Insecta
- Order: Lepidoptera
- Family: Brahmaeidae
- Genus: Dactyloceras
- Species: D. murphyi

Binomial name
- Dactyloceras murphyi Bouyer, 2012

Species of moth

Dactyloceras murphyi is a moth in the family Brahmaeidae. It was described by Thierry Bouyer in 2012. It is found in Malawi.
