= Sabalia fulvicincta =

Scientific classification
- Kingdom: Animalia
- Phylum: Arthropoda
- Class: Insecta
- Order: Lepidoptera
- Family: Brahmaeidae
- Genus: Sabalia
- Species: S. fulvicincta

Binomial name
- Sabalia fulvicincta Hampson, 1901

Species of moth

Sabalia fulvicincta is a moth in the family Brahmaeidae (older classifications placed it in Lemoniidae). It was described by George Hampson in 1901.
