= Dactyloceras ostentator =

Scientific classification
- Kingdom: Animalia
- Phylum: Arthropoda
- Class: Insecta
- Order: Lepidoptera
- Family: Brahmaeidae
- Genus: Dactyloceras
- Species: D. ostentator

Binomial name
- Dactyloceras ostentator Hering, 1927

Species of moth

Dactyloceras ostentator is a moth in the family Brahmaeidae. It was described by Hering in 1927. It is found in Cameroon.
