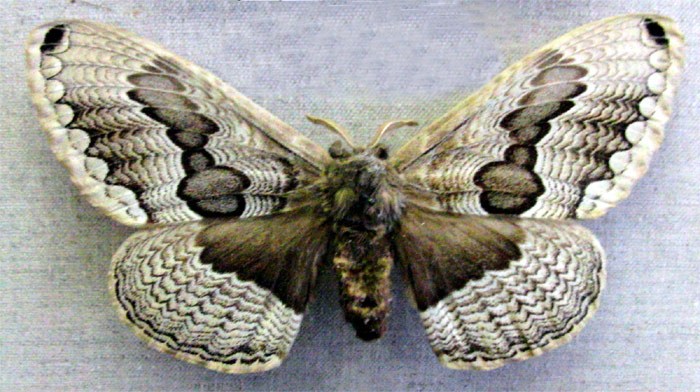

Scientific classification
- Kingdom: Animalia
- Phylum: Arthropoda
- Class: Insecta
- Order: Lepidoptera
- Family: Brahmaeidae
- Genus: Brahmaea
- Species: B. christophi

Binomial name
- Brahmaea christophi Staudinger, 1885

= Brahmaea christophi =

Species of moth

Brahmaea christophi is a moth in the family Brahmaeidae. It was described by Staudinger in 1885. It is found in the humid forests of Talish on the territory of Azerbaijan and Iran. It was named by Otto Staudinger in honor of Hugo Theodor Christoph.
