= Dactyloceras noellae =

Scientific classification
- Kingdom: Animalia
- Phylum: Arthropoda
- Class: Insecta
- Order: Lepidoptera
- Family: Brahmaeidae
- Genus: Dactyloceras
- Species: D. noellae

Binomial name
- Dactyloceras noellae Bouyer, 2006

Species of moth

Dactyloceras noellae is a moth in the family Brahmaeidae. It was described by Thierry Bouyer in 2006. It is found in Kenya.
