= Bucculatrix benacicolella =

Scientific classification
- Kingdom: Animalia
- Phylum: Arthropoda
- Clade: Pancrustacea
- Class: Insecta
- Order: Lepidoptera
- Family: Bucculatricidae
- Genus: Bucculatrix
- Species: B. benacicolella

Binomial name
- Bucculatrix benacicolella Hartig, 1937

Species of moth

Bucculatrix benacicolella is a moth in the family Bucculatricidae. It was described by Friedrich Hartig in 1937. It is found in Italy, Hungary, Serbia and North Macedonia.

The larvae feed on Artemisia alba. They mine the leaves of their host plant. Larvae can be found in June.
