= Sabalia fulleborni =

Scientific classification
- Kingdom: Animalia
- Phylum: Arthropoda
- Class: Insecta
- Order: Lepidoptera
- Family: Brahmaeidae
- Genus: Sabalia
- Species: S. fulleborni

Binomial name
- Sabalia fulleborni Karsch, 1900

Species of moth

Sabalia fulleborni is a moth in the family Brahmaeidae (older classifications placed it in Lemoniidae). It was described by Ferdinand Karsch in 1900.
