= Dactyloceras nebulosum =

Scientific classification
- Kingdom: Animalia
- Phylum: Arthropoda
- Class: Insecta
- Order: Lepidoptera
- Family: Brahmaeidae
- Genus: Dactyloceras
- Species: D. nebulosum

Binomial name
- Dactyloceras nebulosum Brosch, Naumann & Meister, 2002

Species of moth

Dactyloceras nebulosum is a moth in the family Brahmaeidae. It was described by Ulrich Brosch, Stefan Naumann and Frank Meister in 2002. It is found in Cameroon.
