= Sabalia sericaria =

Scientific classification
- Kingdom: Animalia
- Phylum: Arthropoda
- Class: Insecta
- Order: Lepidoptera
- Family: Brahmaeidae
- Genus: Sabalia
- Species: S. sericaria

Binomial name
- Sabalia sericaria (Weymer, 1896)

Species of moth

Sabalia sericaria is a moth in the family Brahmaeidae (older classifications placed it in Lemoniidae). It was described by Gustav Weymer in 1896.
