= Dactyloceras ocelligera =

Scientific classification
- Kingdom: Animalia
- Phylum: Arthropoda
- Class: Insecta
- Order: Lepidoptera
- Family: Brahmaeidae
- Genus: Dactyloceras
- Species: D. ocelligera

Binomial name
- Dactyloceras ocelligera (Butler, 1889)

Synonyms
- Brahmaea ocelligera Butler, 1889

Species of moth

Dactyloceras ocelligera is a moth in the family Brahmaeidae. It was described by Arthur Gardiner Butler in 1889. It is found in Kenya.
