= Dactyloceras vingerhoedti =

Scientific classification
- Kingdom: Animalia
- Phylum: Arthropoda
- Class: Insecta
- Order: Lepidoptera
- Family: Brahmaeidae
- Genus: Dactyloceras
- Species: D. vingerhoedti

Binomial name
- Dactyloceras vingerhoedti Bouyer, 2005

Species of moth

Dactyloceras vingerhoedti is a moth in the family Brahmaeidae. It was described by Thierry Bouyer in 2005. It is found in Tanzania.
