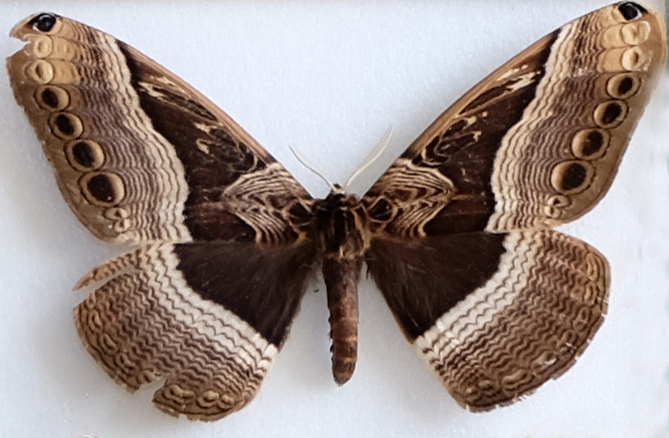
- Dactyloceras bramarbas

Scientific classification
- Kingdom: Animalia
- Phylum: Arthropoda
- Class: Insecta
- Order: Lepidoptera
- Family: Brahmaeidae
- Genus: Dactyloceras
- Species: D. bramarbas

Binomial name
- Dactyloceras bramarbas (Karsch, 1895)

Synonyms
- Brahmaea bramarbas Karsch, 1895

= Dactyloceras bramarbas =

Species of moth

Dactyloceras bramarbas is a moth in the family Brahmaeidae. It was described by Ferdinand Karsch in 1895. It is found in Cameroon.
