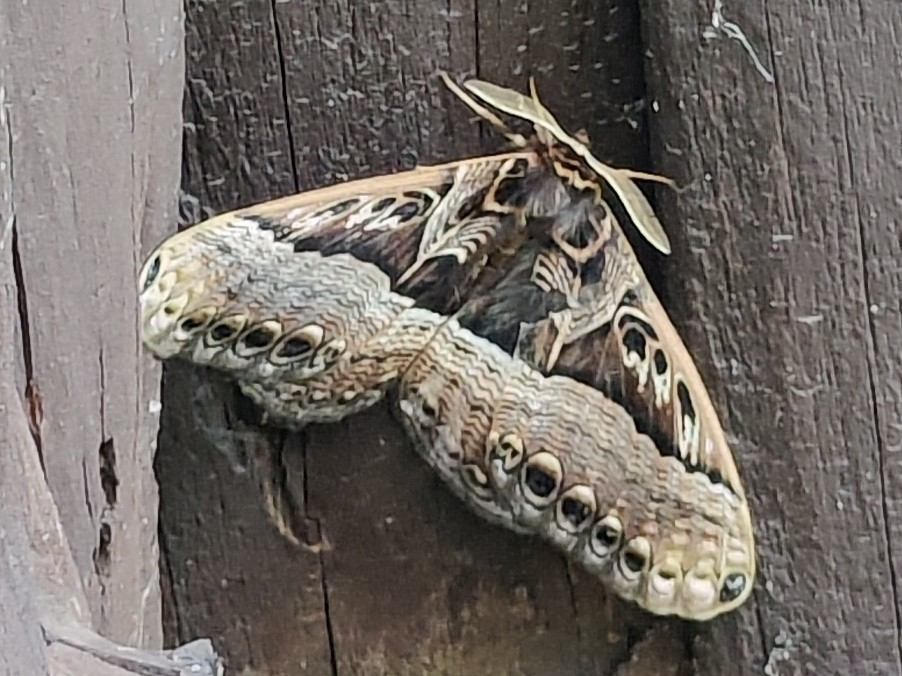

Scientific classification
- Kingdom: Animalia
- Phylum: Arthropoda
- Clade: Pancrustacea
- Class: Insecta
- Order: Lepidoptera
- Family: Brahmaeidae
- Genus: Dactyloceras
- Species: D. neumayeri

Binomial name
- Dactyloceras neumayeri (Pagenstecher, 1885)

Synonyms
- Brahmaea neumayeri Pagenstecher, 1885; Brahmaea neumayeri ab. conjuncta Strand, 1911

= Dactyloceras neumayeri =

Species of moth

Dactyloceras neumayeri is a species of moth in the family Brahmaeidae. It was first described by Pagenstecher in 1885. It is found in Kenya and Tanzania.
