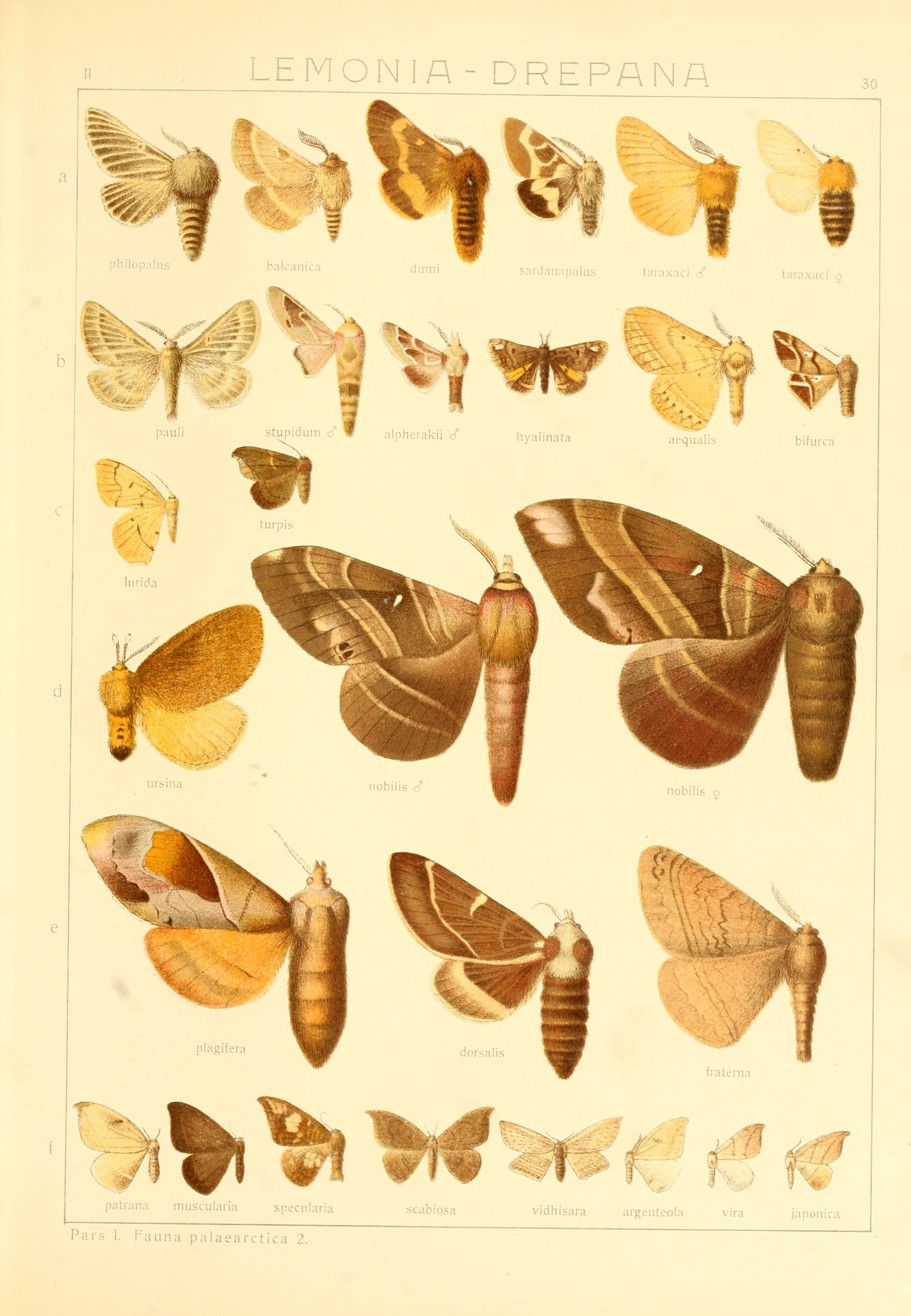
- Illustration of Lemonia pauli as the first moth in the second row (b). Source: The Macrolepidoptera of the World, 1913, edited by Seitz

Scientific classification
- Kingdom: Animalia
- Phylum: Arthropoda
- Class: Insecta
- Order: Lepidoptera
- Family: Brahmaeidae
- Genus: Lemonia
- Species: L. pauli

Binomial name
- Lemonia pauli Staudinger, 1894

= Lemonia pauli =

Species of moth

Lemonia pauli is a species of moth of the family Brahmaeidae (older classifications placed it in Lemoniidae). It was described by Otto Staudinger in 1894. Its range includes Israel, Syria, Jordan and Lebanon.
