= Lemonia pia =

Scientific classification
- Kingdom: Animalia
- Phylum: Arthropoda
- Class: Insecta
- Order: Lepidoptera
- Family: Brahmaeidae
- Genus: Lemonia
- Species: L. pia

Binomial name
- Lemonia pia Püngeler, 1902

Species of moth

Lemonia pia is a moth in the family Brahmaeidae (older classifications placed it in Lemoniidae). It was described by Rudolf Püngeler in 1902.

== Subspecies ==
- Lemonia pia friedeli Witt, 1979
- Lemonia pia pia
