= Dactyloceras tridentata =

Scientific classification
- Kingdom: Animalia
- Phylum: Arthropoda
- Class: Insecta
- Order: Lepidoptera
- Family: Brahmaeidae
- Genus: Dactyloceras
- Species: D. tridentata

Binomial name
- Dactyloceras tridentata (Conte, 1911)

Synonyms
- Brahmaea tridentata Conte, 1911

Species of moth

Dactyloceras tridentata is a moth in the family Brahmaeidae. It was described by A. Conte in 1911. It is found in the Democratic Republic of the Congo.
