= Elachista ladiniella =

Scientific classification
- Domain: Eukaryota
- Kingdom: Animalia
- Phylum: Arthropoda
- Class: Insecta
- Order: Lepidoptera
- Family: Elachistidae
- Genus: Elachista
- Species: E. ladiniella

Binomial name
- Elachista ladiniella Hartig, 1938

Species of moth

Elachista ladiniella is a moth in the family Elachistidae. It was described by Friedrich Hartig in 1938. It is found in southern Austrian state of Tyrol.
