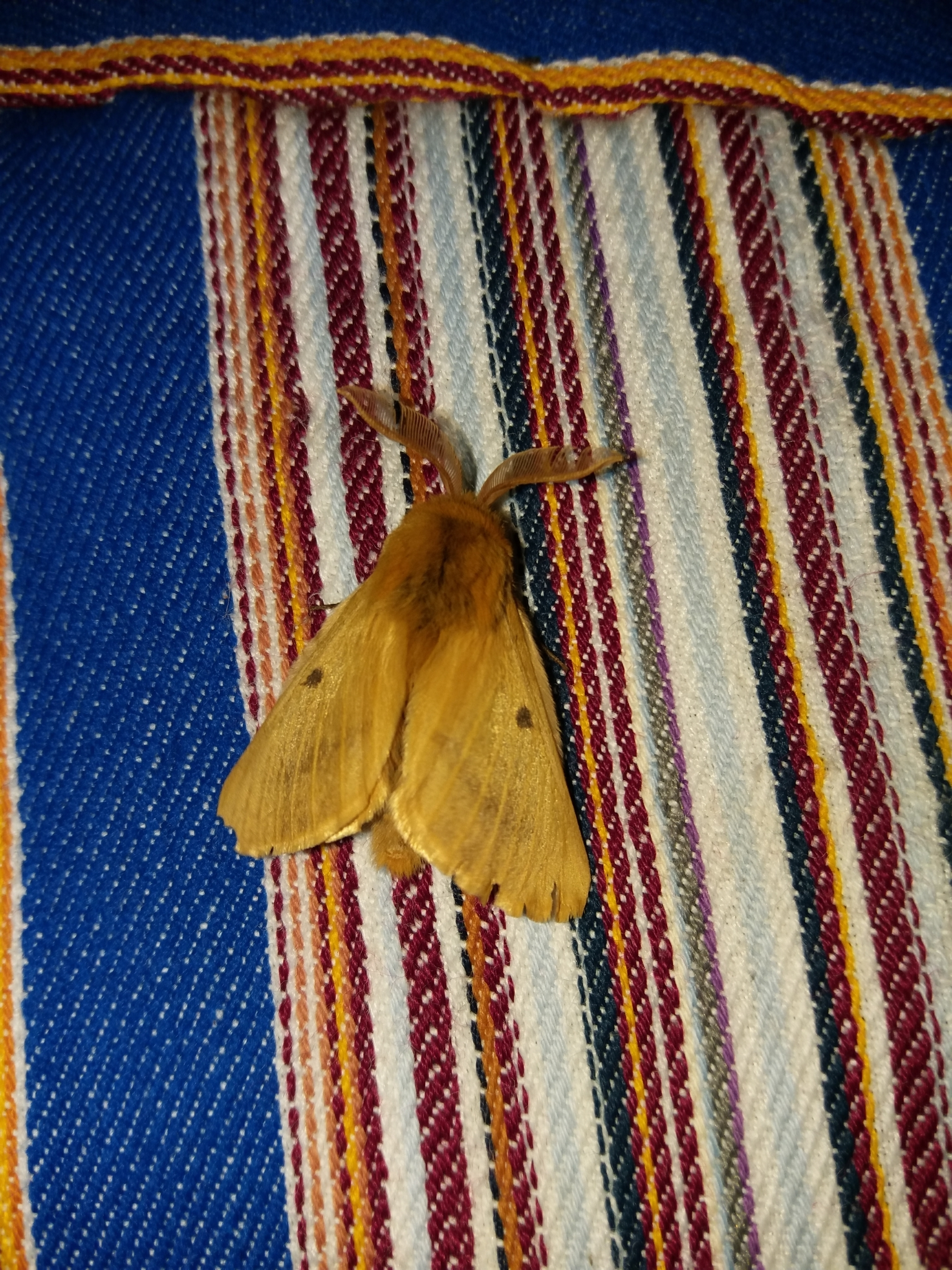

Scientific classification
- Kingdom: Animalia
- Phylum: Arthropoda
- Class: Insecta
- Order: Lepidoptera
- Family: Brahmaeidae
- Genus: Lemonia
- Species: L. vallantini

Binomial name
- Lemonia vallantini Oberthür, 1890

= Lemonia vallantini =

Species of moth

Lemonia vallantini is a species of moth of the family Brahmaeidae (older classifications placed it in Lemoniidae). It is found in Morocco, Algeria and Tunisia.

The wingspan is 24–27 mm. The moth flies from October to January depending on the location.

The larvae feed on Asteraceae species.

== Sources ==
- P.C.-Rougeot, P. Viette (1978). Guide des papillons nocturnes d'Europe et d'Afrique du Nord. Delachaux et Niestlé (Lausanne).
