= Lemonia ponticus =

Scientific classification
- Kingdom: Animalia
- Phylum: Arthropoda
- Class: Insecta
- Order: Lepidoptera
- Family: Brahmaeidae
- Genus: Lemonia
- Species: L. ponticus

Binomial name
- Lemonia ponticus (Aurivillius, 1894)

Species of moth

Lemonia ponticus is a moth in the family Brahmaeidae (older classifications placed it in Lemoniidae). It was described by Per Olof Christopher Aurivillius in 1894.
