= Brahmaea celebica =

Scientific classification
- Kingdom: Animalia
- Phylum: Arthropoda
- Class: Insecta
- Order: Lepidoptera
- Family: Brahmaeidae
- Genus: Brahmaea
- Species: B. celebica

Binomial name
- Brahmaea celebica Toxopeus, 1939

Synonyms
- Brahmaea hearseyi celebica

Species of moth

Brahmaea celebica is a species of moth of the family Brahmaeidae first described by Lambertus Johannes Toxopeus in 1939. It is found on Sulawesi in Indonesia.

== Taxonomy ==
Brahmaea celebica was formerly treated as a subspecies of Brahmaea hearseyi.
