= Klimeschiopsis terroris =

Scientific classification
- Domain: Eukaryota
- Kingdom: Animalia
- Phylum: Arthropoda
- Class: Insecta
- Order: Lepidoptera
- Family: Gelechiidae
- Genus: Klimeschiopsis
- Species: K. terroris

Binomial name
- Klimeschiopsis terroris (Hartig, 1938)

Synonyms
- Phthorimaea (Lita) terroris Hartig, 1938

Species of moth

Klimeschiopsis terroris is a moth in the family Gelechiidae. It was described by Friedrich Hartig in 1938. It is found in Spain.

The wingspan is 11 mm.
