= Sabalia picarina =

Scientific classification
- Kingdom: Animalia
- Phylum: Arthropoda
- Class: Insecta
- Order: Lepidoptera
- Family: Brahmaeidae
- Genus: Sabalia
- Species: S. picarina

Binomial name
- Sabalia picarina Walker, 1865

Synonyms
- Sabalia euterpe Fawcett, 1915

Species of moth

Sabalia picarina is a moth in the family Brahmaeidae (older classifications placed it in Lemoniidae). It was described by Francis Walker in 1865.
