= Dactyloceras barnsi =

Scientific classification
- Kingdom: Animalia
- Phylum: Arthropoda
- Class: Insecta
- Order: Lepidoptera
- Family: Brahmaeidae
- Genus: Dactyloceras
- Species: D. barnsi

Binomial name
- Dactyloceras barnsi (Joicey & Talbot, 1924)

Synonyms
- Brahmaea barnsi Joicey & Talbot, 1924

Species of moth

Dactyloceras barnsi is a species of moth in the family Brahmaeidae. It was first described by James John Joicey and George Talbot in 1924. It is found in Rwanda and possibly Kenya.
