= Dactyloceras ducarmei =

Scientific classification
- Kingdom: Animalia
- Phylum: Arthropoda
- Class: Insecta
- Order: Lepidoptera
- Family: Brahmaeidae
- Genus: Dactyloceras
- Species: D. ducarmei

Binomial name
- Dactyloceras ducarmei Bouyer, 2002

Species of moth

Dactyloceras ducarmei is a moth in the family Brahmaeidae. It was described by Thierry Bouyer in 2002. It is found in the Democratic Republic of the Congo.
