= Dactyloceras swanzii =

Scientific classification
- Kingdom: Animalia
- Phylum: Arthropoda
- Class: Insecta
- Order: Lepidoptera
- Family: Brahmaeidae
- Genus: Dactyloceras
- Species: D. swanzii

Binomial name
- Dactyloceras swanzii (Butler, 1871)

Synonyms
- Brahmaea swanzii Butler, 1871

Species of moth

Dactyloceras swanzii is a moth in the family Brahmaeidae. It was described by Arthur Gardiner Butler in 1871. It is found in Ghana, Guinea, Nigeria and South Africa.
