= Brahmaea naessigi =

Scientific classification
- Kingdom: Animalia
- Phylum: Arthropoda
- Class: Insecta
- Order: Lepidoptera
- Family: Brahmaeidae
- Genus: Brahmaea
- Species: B. naessigi

Binomial name
- Brahmaea naessigi Naumann & Brosch, 2005

Species of moth

Brahmaea naessigi is a moth in the family Brahmaeidae. It was described by Stefan Naumann and Ulrich Brosch in 2005. It is found on Mindanao in the Philippines.
