= Sabalia jacksoni =

Scientific classification
- Kingdom: Animalia
- Phylum: Arthropoda
- Class: Insecta
- Order: Lepidoptera
- Family: Brahmaeidae
- Genus: Sabalia
- Species: S. jacksoni

Binomial name
- Sabalia jacksoni (Sharpe, 1890)

Species of moth

Sabalia jacksoni is a moth in the family Brahmaeidae (older classifications placed it in Lemoniidae). It was described by Emily Mary Bowdler Sharpe in 1890.
