= Dactyloceras canui =

Scientific classification
- Kingdom: Animalia
- Phylum: Arthropoda
- Class: Insecta
- Order: Lepidoptera
- Family: Brahmaeidae
- Genus: Dactyloceras
- Species: D. canui

Binomial name
- Dactyloceras canui Bouyer, 2002

Species of moth

Dactyloceras canui is a moth in the family Brahmaeidae. It was described by Thierry Bouyer in 2002. It is found in Equatorial Guinea and possibly Kenya.
