= Brahmidia polymehntas =

Scientific classification
- Kingdom: Animalia
- Phylum: Arthropoda
- Class: Insecta
- Order: Lepidoptera
- Family: Brahmaeidae
- Genus: Brahmaea
- Species: B. polymehntas

Binomial name
- Brahmaea polymehntas H.-L. Hao, X.-R. Zhang & J.-K. Yang, 2002

Species of moth

Brahmidia polymehntas is a moth in the Brahmaeidae family. It was described by Hui-Ling Hao, Xiu-Rong Zhang and Ji-Kun Yang in 2002. It is found in the Zhejiang, China.
