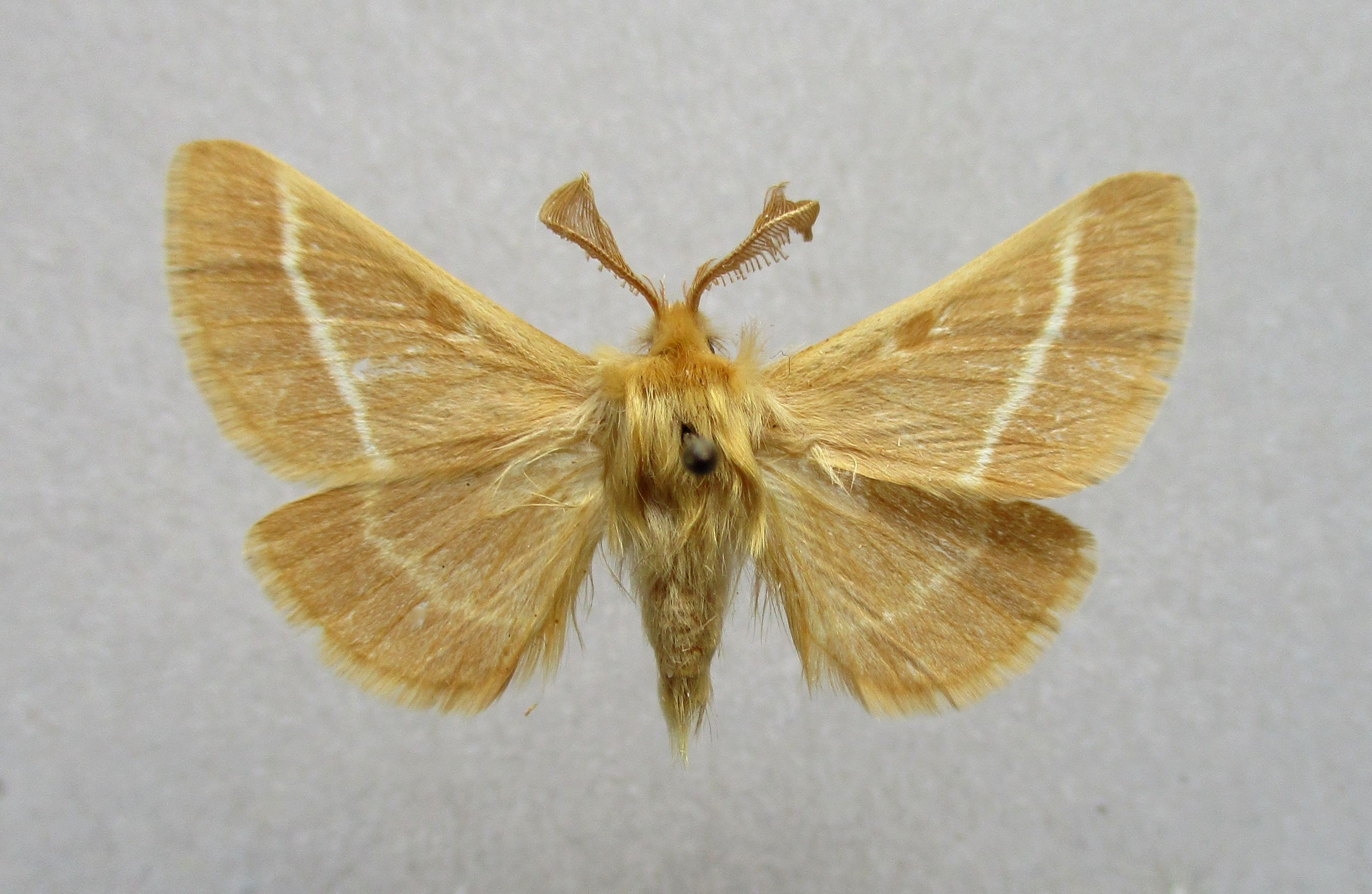

Scientific classification
- Kingdom: Animalia
- Phylum: Arthropoda
- Class: Insecta
- Order: Lepidoptera
- Family: Brahmaeidae
- Genus: Lemonia
- Species: L. peilei

Binomial name
- Lemonia peilei Rothschild, 1921

= Lemonia peilei =

Species of moth

Lemonia peilei is a moth in the family Brahmaeidae (older classifications placed it in Lemoniidae). It was described by Walter Rothschild in 1921.

== Subspecies ==
- Lemonia peilei farsica Wiltshire, 1946
- Lemonia peilei klapperichi Wiltshire, 1961
- Lemonia peilei peilei
- Lemonia peilei talhouki Wiltshire, 1952
