= Dactyloceras catenigera =

Scientific classification
- Kingdom: Animalia
- Phylum: Arthropoda
- Class: Insecta
- Order: Lepidoptera
- Family: Brahmaeidae
- Genus: Dactyloceras
- Species: D. catenigera

Binomial name
- Dactyloceras catenigera (Karsch, 1895)

Synonyms
- Brahmaea catenigera Karsch, 1895; Brahmaea catenaria Grünberg, 1895

Species of moth

Dactyloceras catenigera is a moth in the family Brahmaeidae. It was described by Ferdinand Karsch in 1895. It is found in Tanzania.
