= Dactyloceras widenmanni =

Scientific classification
- Kingdom: Animalia
- Phylum: Arthropoda
- Class: Insecta
- Order: Lepidoptera
- Family: Brahmaeidae
- Genus: Dactyloceras
- Species: D. widenmanni

Binomial name
- Dactyloceras widenmanni (Karsch, 1895)

Synonyms
- Brahmaea widenmanni Karsch, 1895; Dactyloceras arrogans Hering, 1927; Dactyloceras conjunctum Hering, 1927; Dactyloceras wiedenmanni Aurivillius, 1910

Species of moth

Dactyloceras widenmanni is a moth in the family Brahmaeidae. It was described by Ferdinand Karsch in 1895. It is found in the Democratic Republic of the Congo, Ethiopia, South Africa and Tanzania.
