= Brahmaea ardjoeno =

Scientific classification
- Kingdom: Animalia
- Phylum: Arthropoda
- Class: Insecta
- Order: Lepidoptera
- Family: Brahmaeidae
- Genus: Brahmaea
- Species: B. ardjoeno

Binomial name
- Brahmaea ardjoeno Kalis, 1934

Synonyms
- Brahmaea hearseyi luchti Dupont, 1937

Species of moth

Brahmaea ardjoeno is a moth in the family Brahmaeidae. It was described by Kalis in 1934. It is found on Java and Borneo and possibly in the Philippines (Luzon, Mindoro, Panay, Negros and Mindanao).
