= Dactyloceras maculata =

Scientific classification
- Kingdom: Animalia
- Phylum: Arthropoda
- Class: Insecta
- Order: Lepidoptera
- Family: Brahmaeidae
- Genus: Dactyloceras
- Species: D. maculata

Binomial name
- Dactyloceras maculata (Conte, 1911)

Synonyms
- Brahmaea maculata Conte, 1911

Species of moth

Dactyloceras maculata is a moth in the family Brahmaeidae. It was described by A. Conte in 1911. It is found in Kenya and Tanzania.
