= Sabalia tippelskirchi =

Scientific classification
- Kingdom: Animalia
- Phylum: Arthropoda
- Class: Insecta
- Order: Lepidoptera
- Family: Brahmaeidae
- Genus: Sabalia
- Species: S. tippelskirchi

Binomial name
- Sabalia tippelskirchi Karsch, 1898

Synonyms
- Sabalia tippelscirchi

Species of moth

Sabalia tippelskirchi is a moth in the family Brahmaeidae (older classifications placed it in Lemoniidae). It was described by Ferdinand Karsch in 1898.
