= Lemonia sardanapalus =

Scientific classification
- Kingdom: Animalia
- Phylum: Arthropoda
- Class: Insecta
- Order: Lepidoptera
- Family: Brahmaeidae
- Genus: Lemonia
- Species: L. sardanapalus

Binomial name
- Lemonia sardanapalus Staudinger, 1887

Species of moth

Lemonia sardanapalus is a moth in the family Brahmaeidae (older classifications placed it in Lemoniidae). It was described by Otto Staudinger in 1887. It is known from Turkmenistan.
