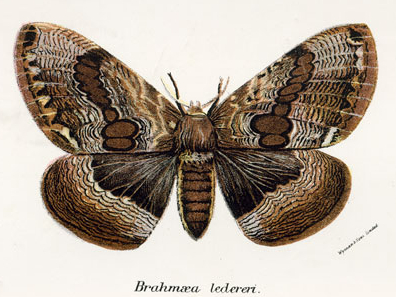

Scientific classification
- Kingdom: Animalia
- Phylum: Arthropoda
- Class: Insecta
- Order: Lepidoptera
- Family: Brahmaeidae
- Genus: Brahmaea
- Species: B. ledereri

Binomial name
- Brahmaea ledereri Rogenhofer, 1873

= Brahmaea ledereri =

Species of moth

Brahmaea ledereri is a species of moth of the family Brahmaeidae first described by Alois Friedrich Rogenhofer in 1873. It is found in Turkey.

The wingspan is 110–125 mm.

== Subspecies ==
- Brahmaea ledereri ledereri Rogenhofer, 1873
- Brahmaea ledereri zaba de Freina, 1982 (eastern Turkey)
