= Lemonia beirutica =

Scientific classification
- Kingdom: Animalia
- Phylum: Arthropoda
- Class: Insecta
- Order: Lepidoptera
- Family: Brahmaeidae
- Genus: Lemonia
- Species: L. beirutica

Binomial name
- Lemonia beirutica Daniel, 1965

Species of moth

Lemonia beirutica is a species of moth of the family Brahmaeidae (older classifications placed it in Lemoniidae). It was described by Franz Daniel in 1965. The range includes Israel and Lebanon.
