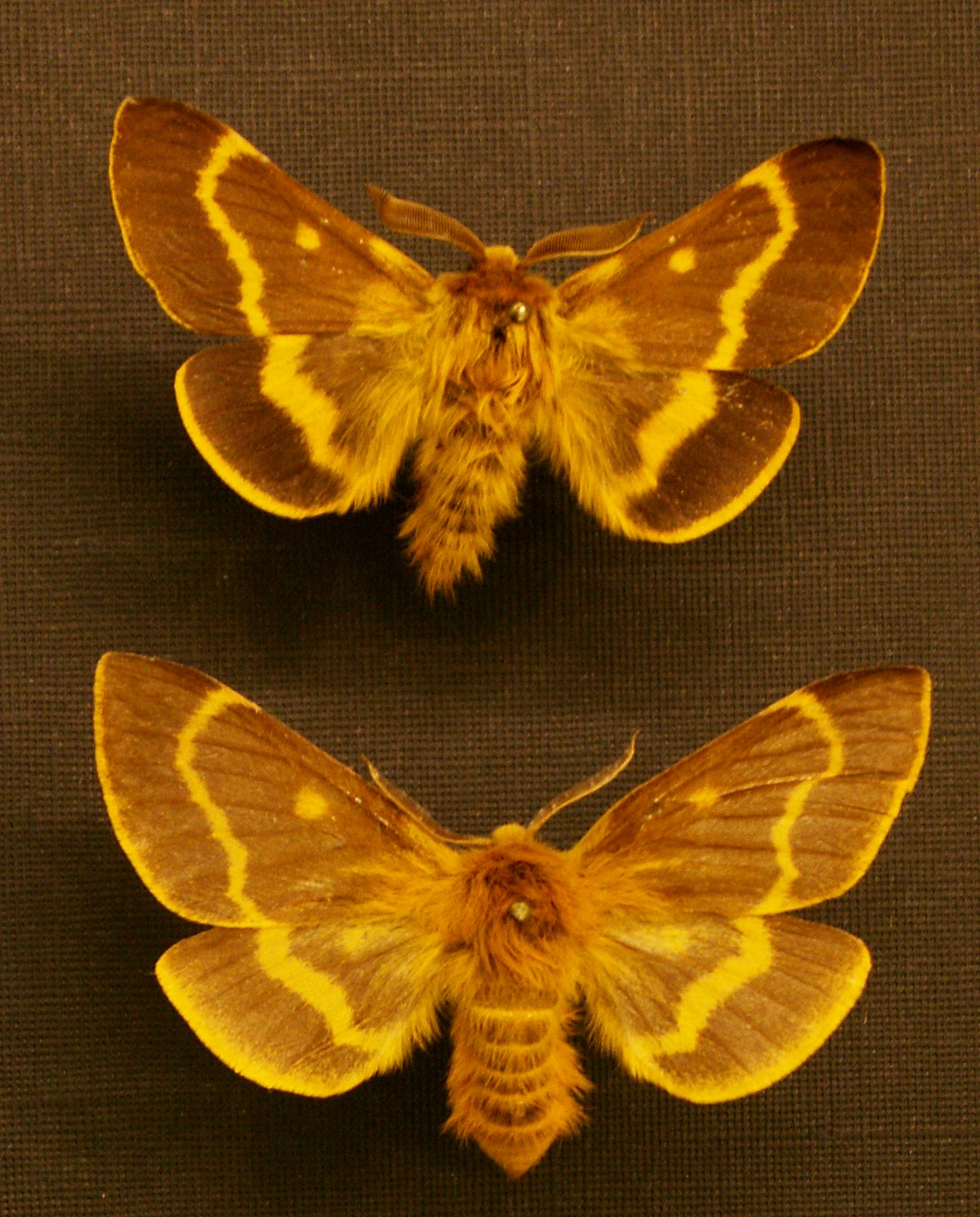
- Male and female

Scientific classification
- Kingdom: Animalia
- Phylum: Arthropoda
- Clade: Pancrustacea
- Class: Insecta
- Order: Lepidoptera
- Family: Brahmaeidae
- Genus: Lemonia
- Species: L. dumi

Binomial name
- Lemonia dumi (Linnaeus, 1761)

Synonyms
- Phalaena dumi Linnaeus, 1761; Phalaena dumeti Linnaeus, 1767; Lemonia luteornata Klemensiewicz, 1912; Lemonia dumi ab. sauberi Warnecke, 1923; Lemonia schleppniki Loebel, 1934

= Lemonia dumi =

Species of moth

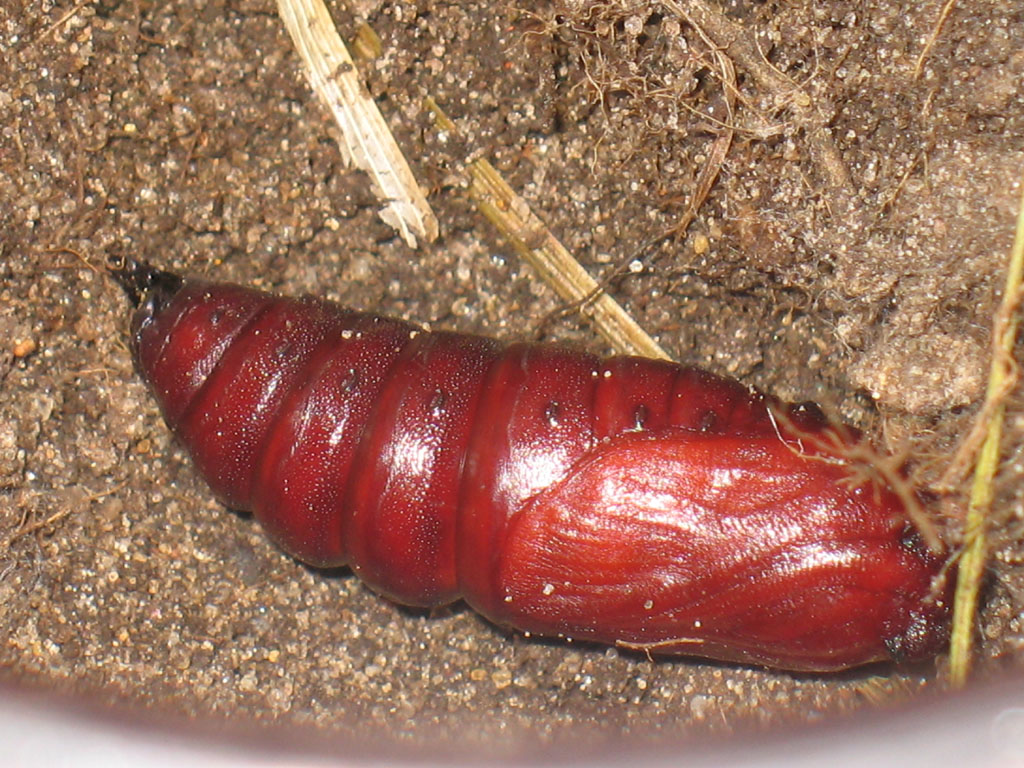
pupae

Lemonia dumi is a species of moth of the family Brahmaeidae (older classifications placed it in Lemoniidae). It is found in scattered populations in Central Europe.

The wingspan is 45–65 mm. The moth flies from October to November depending on the location.

The larvae feed on Hieracium and Taraxacum species.
