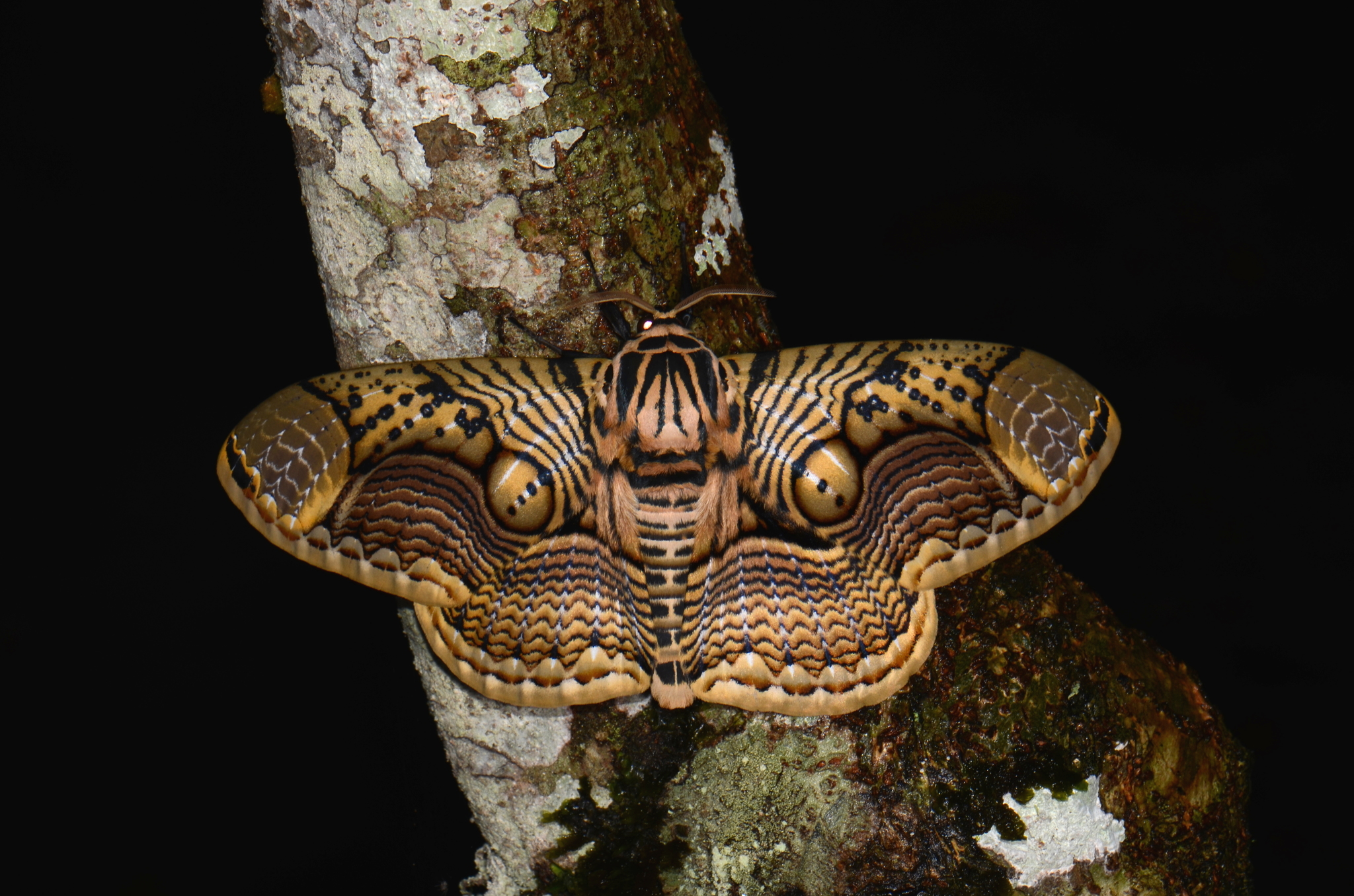

Scientific classification
- Kingdom: Animalia
- Phylum: Arthropoda
- Class: Insecta
- Order: Lepidoptera
- Family: Brahmaeidae
- Genus: Brahmaea
- Species: B. hearseyi

Binomial name
- Brahmaea hearseyi White, 1862

Synonyms
- Brahmophthalma hearseyi; Brahmaea whitei Butler, 1866

= Brahmaea hearseyi =

Species of moth

Brahmaea hearseyi is a species of moth of the family Brahmaeidae. It is found in N.E. Himalaya, Burma, Western China, Sundaland and the Philippines.

The wingspan ranges up to 200 mm.

The larvae feed on Ligustrum, Syringa, and Fraxinus species.

== Taxonomy ==
Brahmaea celebica was formerly treated as a subspecies of Brahmaea hearseyi.

- The Moths of Borneo
