= Sabalia thalia =

Scientific classification
- Kingdom: Animalia
- Phylum: Arthropoda
- Class: Insecta
- Order: Lepidoptera
- Family: Brahmaeidae
- Genus: Sabalia
- Species: S. thalia

Binomial name
- Sabalia thalia Fawcett, 1915

Species of moth

Sabalia thalia is a moth in the family Brahmaeidae (older classifications placed it in Lemoniidae). It was described by James Farish Malcolm Fawcett in 1915.
