= Sabalia barnsi =

Scientific classification
- Kingdom: Animalia
- Phylum: Arthropoda
- Clade: Pancrustacea
- Class: Insecta
- Order: Lepidoptera
- Family: Brahmaeidae
- Genus: Sabalia
- Species: S. barnsi

Binomial name
- Sabalia barnsi Prout, 1918

Species of moth

Sabalia barnsi is a moth in the family Brahmaeidae (older classifications placed it in Lemoniidae). It was described by Louis Beethoven Prout in 1918.
