= Dactyloceras =

- D. lucina male

Scientific classification
- Kingdom: Animalia
- Phylum: Arthropoda
- Class: Insecta
- Order: Lepidoptera
- Family: Brahmaeidae
- Genus: Dactyloceras; Mell, 1930

Species
- See text

Genus of moths

Dactyloceras is a genus of moths of the family Brahmaeidae.

== Species ==
- Subgenus Shinocksiceras Bouyer, 2002
  - Dactyloceras barnsi Joicey & Talbot, 1924
  - Dactyloceras bramarbas Karsch, 1895
  - Dactyloceras canui Bouyer, 2002
  - Dactyloceras catenigera Karsch, 1895
  - Dactyloceras ducarmei Bouyer, 2002
  - Dactyloceras karinae Bouyer, 2002
  - Dactyloceras maculata Conte, 1911
  - Dactyloceras murphyi Bouyer, 2012
  - Dactyloceras neumayeri Pagenstecher, 1885
  - Dactyloceras noellae Bouyer, 2006
  - Dactyloceras ocelligera Butler, 1889
  - Dactyloceras ostentator Hering, 1927
  - Dactyloceras richinii Berio, 1940
  - Dactyloceras swanzii (Butler, 1871)
  - Dactyloceras tridentata (Conte, 1911)
  - Dactyloceras vingerhoedti Bouyer, 2005
  - Dactyloceras widenmanni Karsch, 1895
- Subgenus Dactyloceras
  - Dactyloceras lucina (Drury, 1782)
  - Dactyloceras nebulosum Brosch, Naumann & Meister, 2002
