= Klimeschiopsis discontinuella =

Scientific classification
- Domain: Eukaryota
- Kingdom: Animalia
- Phylum: Arthropoda
- Class: Insecta
- Order: Lepidoptera
- Family: Gelechiidae
- Genus: Klimeschiopsis
- Species: K. discontinuella

Binomial name
- Klimeschiopsis discontinuella (Rebel, 1899)

Synonyms
- Gelechia discontinuella Rebel, 1899

Species of moth

Klimeschiopsis discontinuella is a moth in the family Gelechiidae. It was described by Rebel in 1899. It is found in the southern Alps in Switzerland and northern Italy, as well as the Altai Mountains in Russia.

The wingspan is 13.5–14 mm. The forewings are greyish-black with whitish-grey markings. The hindwings are whitish-grey.
