= Sabalia =

Scientific classification
- Kingdom: Animalia
- Phylum: Arthropoda
- Class: Insecta
- Order: Lepidoptera
- Family: Brahmaeidae
- Genus: Sabalia; Walker, 1865

Type species
- Sabalia picarina Walker, 1865

Synonyms
- Conventia Weymer, 1896; Heteranaphe Sharpe, 1890; Hyperanaphe Kirby, 1892; Hypernaphe Kirby, 1892

Genus of moths

Sabalia is a genus of moths in the family Brahmaeidae (older classifications placed it in Lemoniidae).

== Selected species ==
- Sabalia barnsi Prout, 1918
- Sabalia fulleborni Karsch, 1900
- Sabalia fulvicincta Hampson, 1901
- Sabalia jacksoni (Sharpe, 1890)
- Sabalia picarina Walker, 1865 (=Sabalia euterpe Fawcett, 1915)
- Sabalia sericaria (Weymer, 1896)
- Sabalia thalia Fawcett, 1915
- Sabalia tippelskirchi Karsch, 1898 (=Sabalia tippelscirchi)
