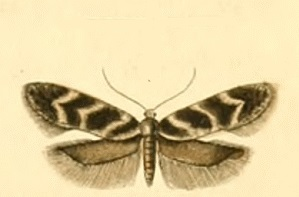

Scientific classification
- Domain: Eukaryota
- Kingdom: Animalia
- Phylum: Arthropoda
- Class: Insecta
- Order: Lepidoptera
- Family: Gelechiidae
- Genus: Klimeschiopsis
- Species: K. kiningerella

Binomial name
- Klimeschiopsis kiningerella (Duponchel, 1843)

Synonyms
- Lita kiningerella Duponchel, 1843; Klimeschiopsis kiningerellum; Phthorimaea atralbella Palm, 1947

= Klimeschiopsis kiningerella =

Species of moth

Klimeschiopsis kiningerella is a moth in the family Gelechiidae. It was described by Philogène Auguste Joseph Duponchel in 1843. It is found in France, Germany, Italy, Switzerland, Austria, Poland, the Czech Republic, Slovakia, Hungary, Bulgaria, North Macedonia, Greece, Norway, Sweden, Finland, Estonia, Latvia, Ukraine and Russia.

The wingspan is 11–13 mm. Adults have been recorded on wing from June to August.
