= Klimeschiopsis sinevi =

Scientific classification
- Domain: Eukaryota
- Kingdom: Animalia
- Phylum: Arthropoda
- Class: Insecta
- Order: Lepidoptera
- Family: Gelechiidae
- Genus: Klimeschiopsis
- Species: K. sinevi

Binomial name
- Klimeschiopsis sinevi Bidzilya, 2012

Species of moth

Klimeschiopsis sinevi is a moth in the family Gelechiidae. It was described by Oleksiy V. Bidzilya in 2012. It is found in northern Iran, eastern Georgia and Azerbaijan.
