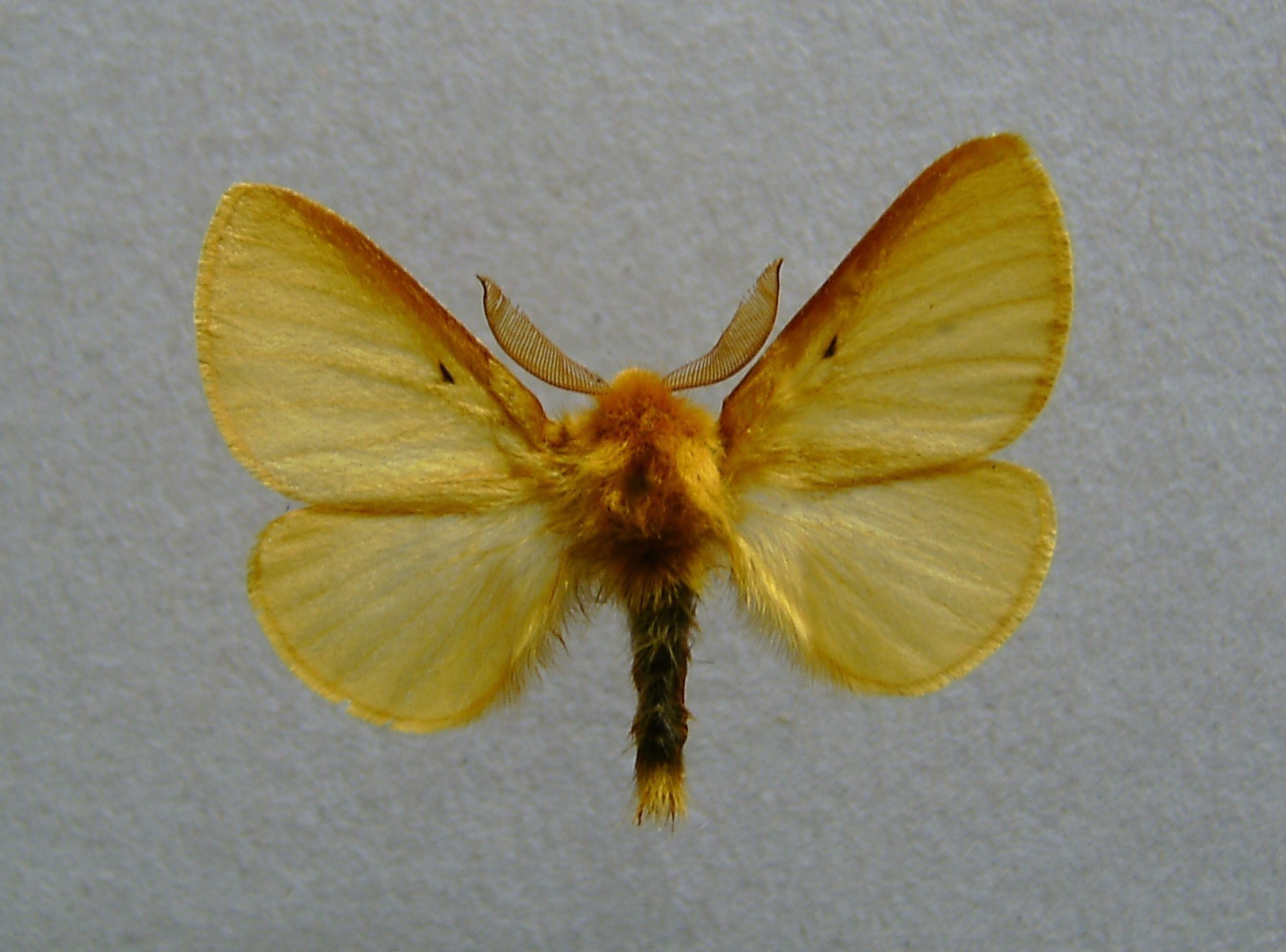

Scientific classification
- Kingdom: Animalia
- Phylum: Arthropoda
- Class: Insecta
- Order: Lepidoptera
- Family: Brahmaeidae
- Genus: Lemonia
- Species: L. taraxaci

Binomial name
- Lemonia taraxaci (Denis & Schiffermüller, 1775)

Synonyms
- Bombyx taraxaci Denis & Schiffermüller, 1775; Lemonia antigone Stauder, 1902; Lemonia immaculata Wnukowsky, 1926; Lemonia montana Buresch, 1915; Lemonia sibirica Wnukowsky, 1934; Lemonia terranea Rothschild, 1909

= Lemonia taraxaci =

Species of moth

Lemonia taraxaci, the autumn silkworm moth, is a species of moth of the family Brahmaeidae (older classifications placed it in Lemoniidae). It was first described by Michael Denis and Ignaz Schiffermüller in 1775 and it is found in south-eastern Europe.

The wingspan is 45–65 mm. The moth flies from August to October depending on the location.

The larvae feed on Hieracium and Taraxacum species.
