= Calliprogonos =

Scientific classification
- Kingdom: Animalia
- Phylum: Arthropoda
- Class: Insecta
- Order: Lepidoptera
- Family: Brahmaeidae
- Genus: Calliprogonos; Mell, 1937
- Species: C. miraculosa

Binomial name
- Calliprogonos miraculosa Mell, 1937

Genus of moths

Calliprogonos is a monotypic moth genus of the family Brahmaeidae. It contains only one species, Calliprogonos miraculosa, which is found in China. Both the genus and species were first described by Rudolf Mell in 1937.
