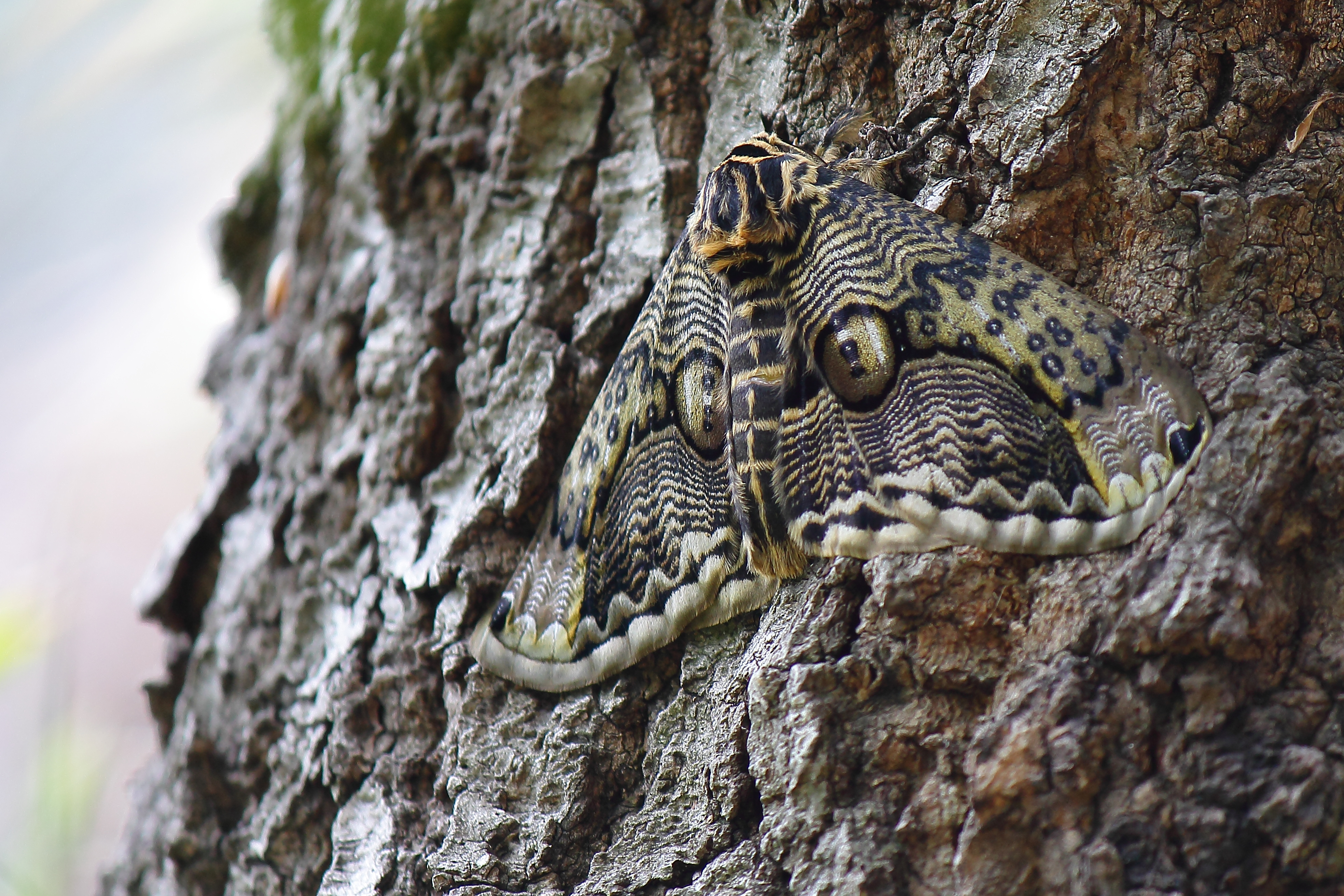

Scientific classification
- Kingdom: Animalia
- Phylum: Arthropoda
- Class: Insecta
- Order: Lepidoptera
- Family: Brahmaeidae
- Genus: Brahmaea
- Species: B. japonica

Binomial name
- Brahmaea japonica (Butler, 1873)

= Brahmaea japonica =

Species of moth

Brahmaea japonica, the Japanese owl moth, is a species of moth of the Brahmaeidae family native to Japan.

== Description ==
The wingspan is 80–115 mm. The male is smaller than the female. The wings are wide with a rounded outer edge. The background of the wings is brown to black. The wing pattern is represented by concentric alternating wavy light and dark lines at the root and in the distal half of the wings, as well as a sinuous marginal border. The pattern is represented by a large number of light wavy lines. On the forewing, the M2 vein originates slightly below the R-Cu apex of the wing cell; its base is 3–5 times closer to the base of M1 than to M3. Antennae pinnate, with 2 pairs of outgrowths on each segment; in females, the outgrowths are much shorter. Caterpillars feed on plants of the genus Privet (Ligustrum) from the olive family (Oleaceae).

== Taxonomy ==
It is sometimes treated as a subspecies of Brahmaea wallichii.
