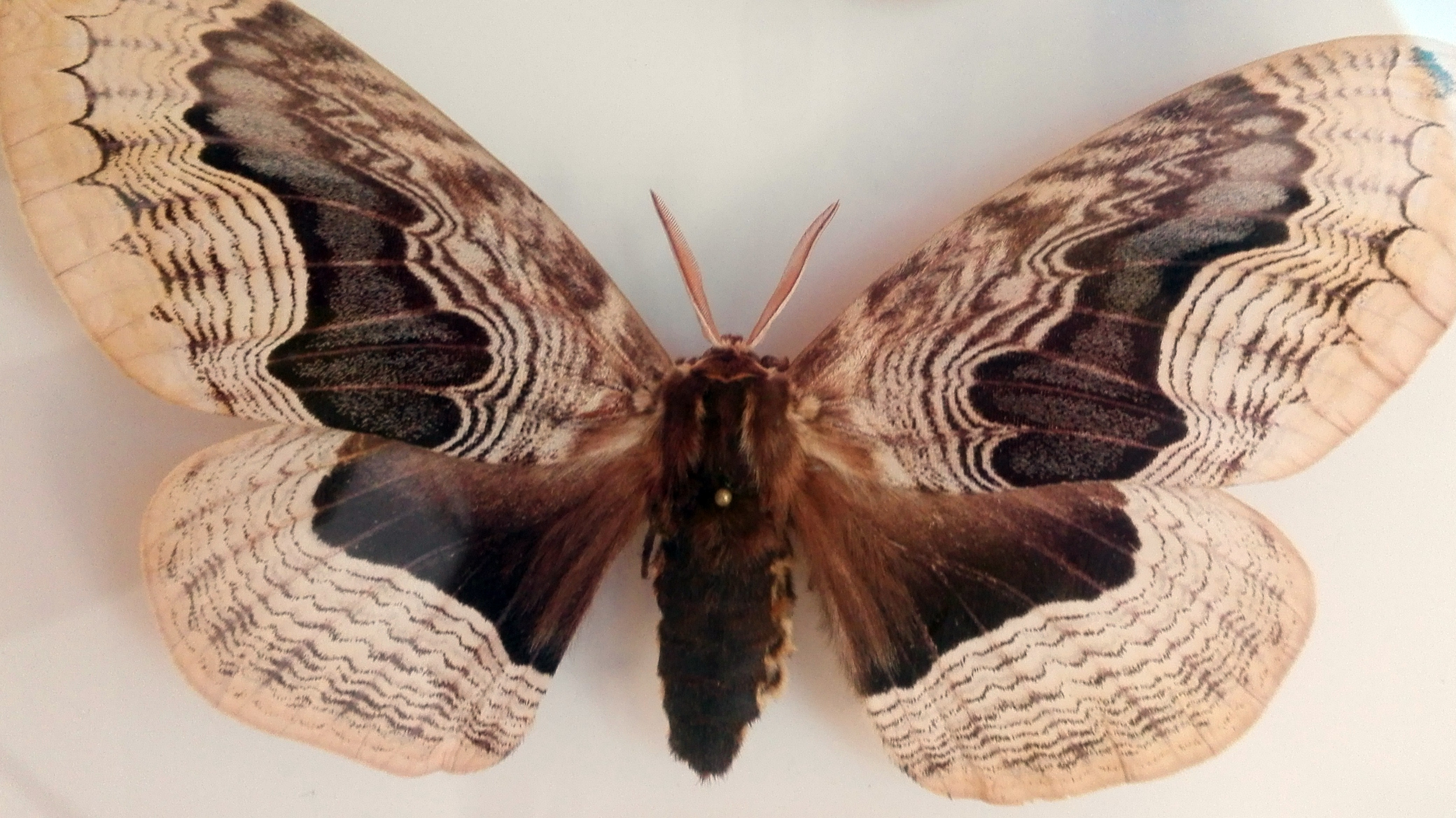

Scientific classification
- Kingdom: Animalia
- Phylum: Arthropoda
- Class: Insecta
- Order: Lepidoptera
- Family: Brahmaeidae
- Genus: Brahmaea
- Species: B. tancrei

Binomial name
- Brahmaea tancrei Austaut, 1896

= Brahmaea tancrei =

Siberian owl moth

Species of moth

Brahmaea tancrei, the Siberian owl moth, is a moth in the family Brahmaeidae. It was described by Jules Léon Austaut in 1896. It is found from Russia (Amur, Siberia and in the Russian Far East) to Korea and China and south to Indonesia.

Adults are on wing in April, probably in one generation per year.

Larvae have been recorded feeding on Ligustrum ovalifolium and Ligustrum vulgare.
