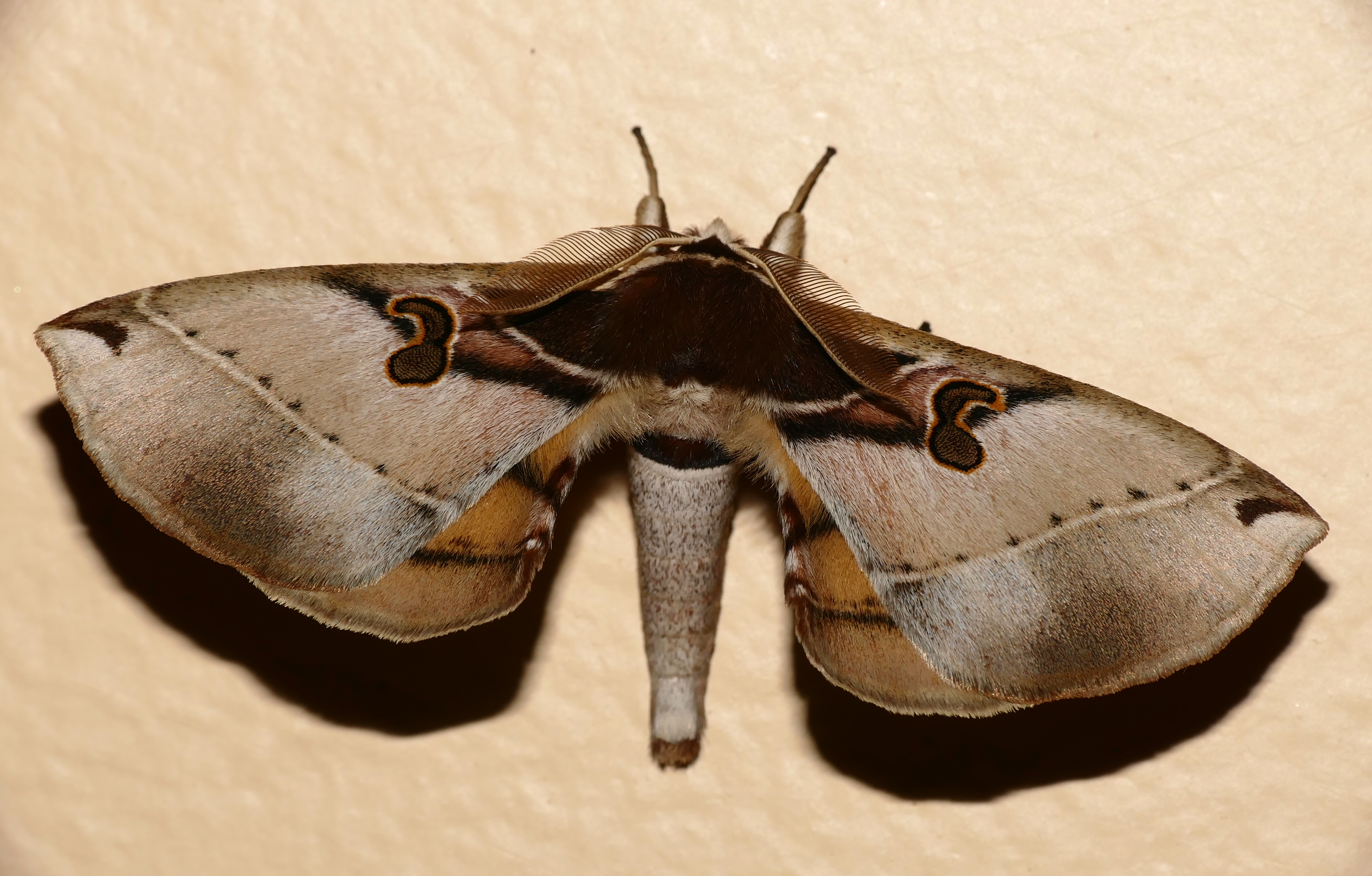

Scientific classification
- Kingdom: Animalia
- Phylum: Arthropoda
- Clade: Pancrustacea
- Class: Insecta
- Order: Lepidoptera
- Family: Brahmaeidae
- Genus: Spiramiopsis; Hampson, 1901
- Species: S. comma

Binomial name
- Spiramiopsis comma Hampson, 1901

= Spiramiopsis =

Genus of moths

Spiramiopsis is a genus of moths in the family Brahmaeidae. It contains the single species Spiramiopsis comma, which is found in South Africa.
