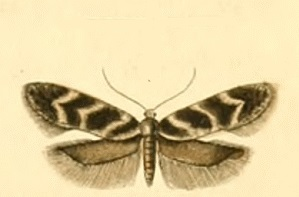
- Klimeschiopsis kiningerella

Scientific classification
- Kingdom: Animalia
- Phylum: Arthropoda
- Clade: Pancrustacea
- Class: Insecta
- Order: Lepidoptera
- Family: Gelechiidae
- Tribe: Gnorimoschemini
- Genus: Klimeschiopsis; Povolný, 1967

= Klimeschiopsis =

Genus of moths

Klimeschiopsis is a genus of moths in the family Gelechiidae.

== Species ==
- Klimeschiopsis afghana Povolný, 1968
- Klimeschiopsis discontinuella (Rebel, 1899)
- Klimeschiopsis kiningerella (Duponchel, 1843)
- Klimeschiopsis sinevi Bidzilya, 2012
- Klimeschiopsis terroris (Hartig, 1938)
