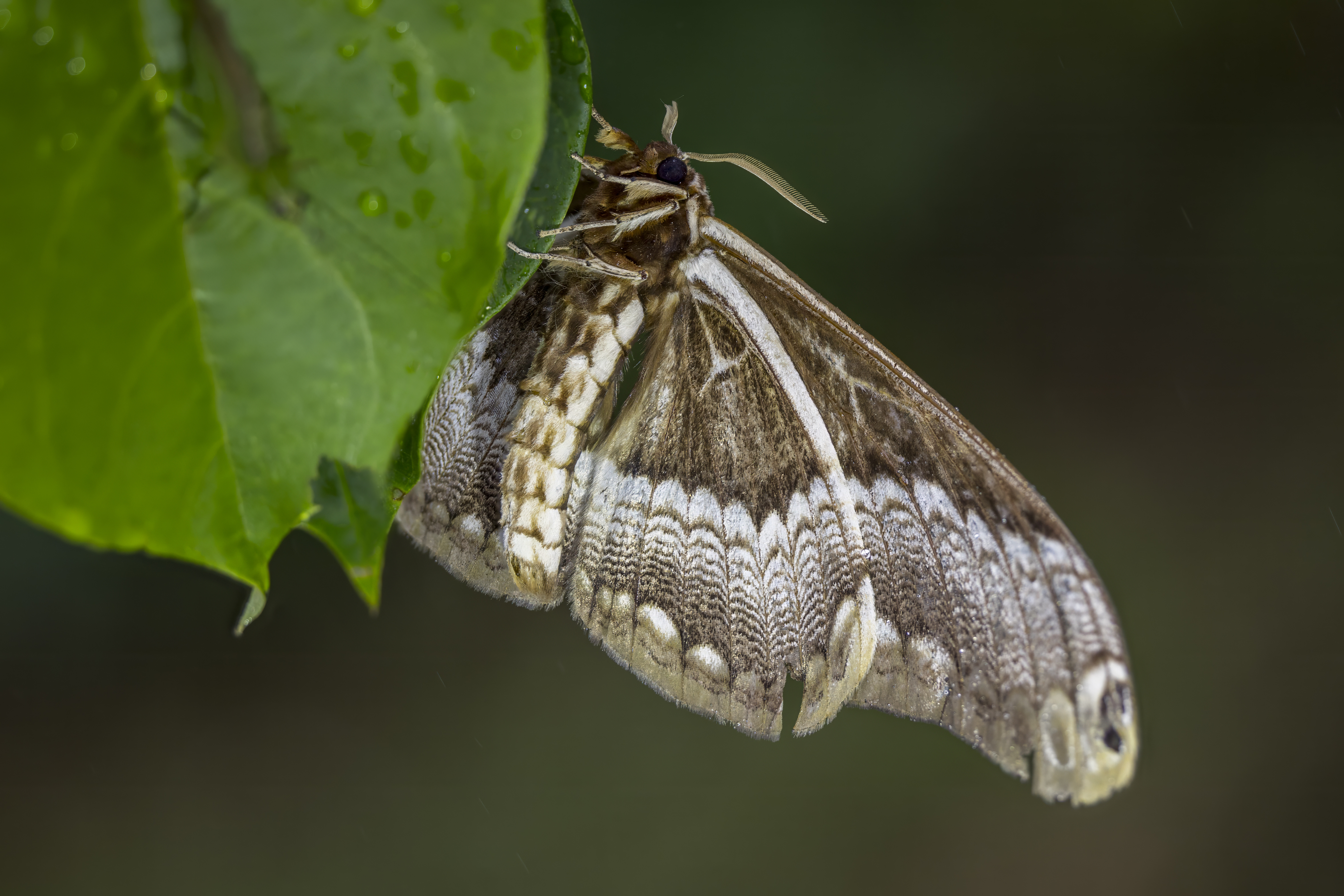
- upper and underside of male in Ghana

Scientific classification
- Kingdom: Animalia
- Phylum: Arthropoda
- Class: Insecta
- Order: Lepidoptera
- Family: Brahmaeidae
- Genus: Dactyloceras
- Species: D. lucina

Binomial name
- Dactyloceras lucina (Drury, 1782)

Synonyms
- Phalaena (Attacus) lucina Drury, 1782

= Dactyloceras lucina =

Species of moth

Dactyloceras lucina is a species of very large moth of the family Brahmaeidae. It is found in central and west Africa, where it has been recorded from Equatorial Guinea, Ghana, Ivory Coast, Kenya, Sierra Leone, Uganda and Zambia. The species was first described by Dru Drury in 1782.

== Description ==
Upperside: Antennae yellow and pectinated (comb like). Thorax and abdomen brown. Wings russet brown and cream coloured, disposed in a great variety of different shaped marks. Anterior wings next the body with a number of angulated lines following each other in a regular succession; the middle being composed of another succession of undulated lines crossing the wings from the anterior to the posterior edges: a black oval spot is placed at the tips, and a row of different sized oval marks runs along the external edges. Posterior wings next the body dark brown, the middle and bottom having a series of undulated lines crossing them in regular succession from the anterior to the abdominal edges, while a row of light and dark oval marks is placed along the external edges.

Underside: Palpi brown. Legs cream coloured. Breast, sides, and abdomen brown. Wings differing but slightly from the upper side; the general manner of marking being still preserved here. On the upper part of the posterior wings, next the body, is a triangular cream spot, the inner space being brown. Margins of the wings entire. Wingspan 6 3/4 inches (170 mm).
