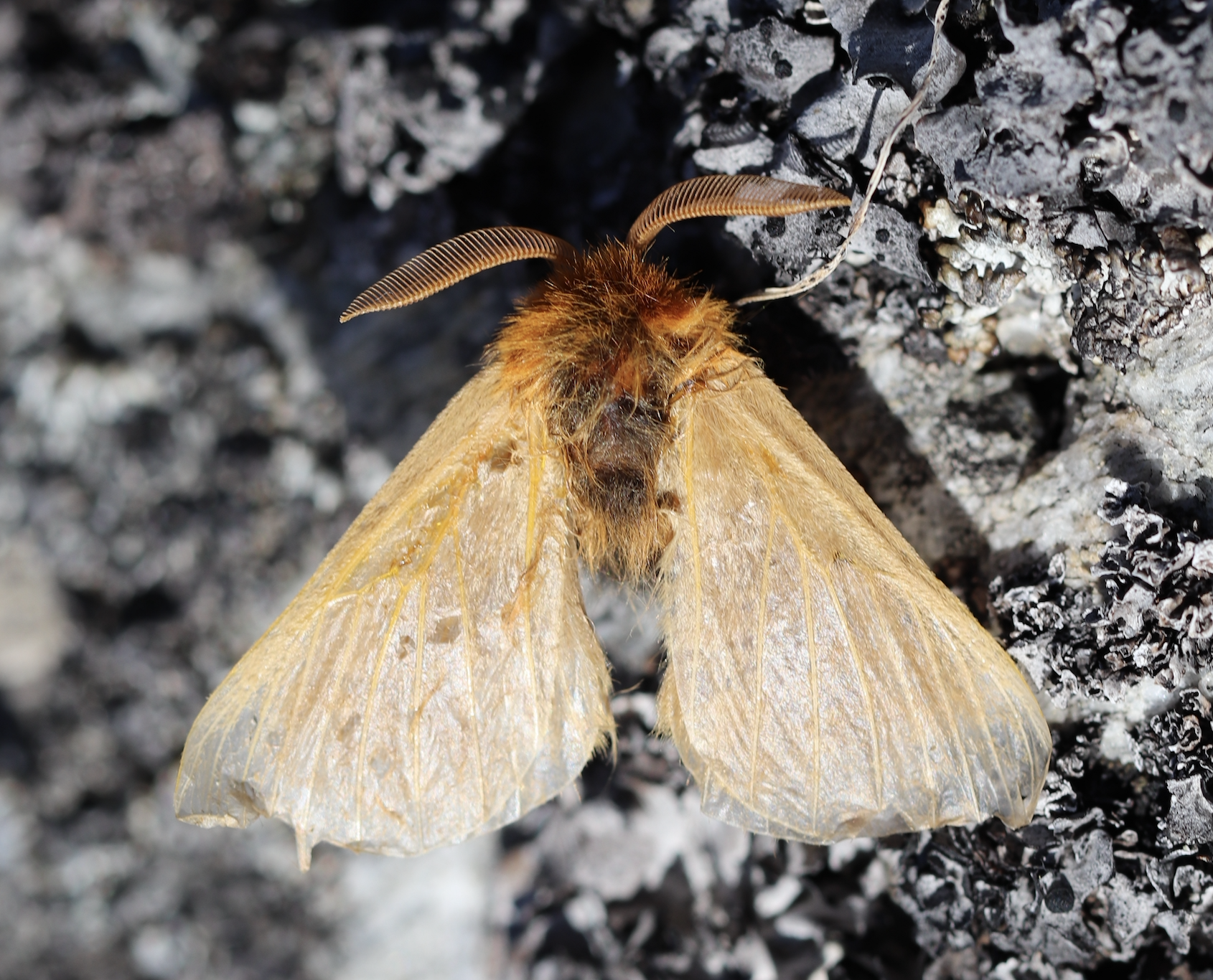
- Lemonia taraxaci

Scientific classification
- Kingdom: Animalia
- Phylum: Arthropoda
- Clade: Pancrustacea
- Class: Insecta
- Order: Lepidoptera
- Family: Brahmaeidae
- Genus: Lemonia; Hübner, [1820] 1816

Type species
- Bombyx taraxaci (Denis & Schiffermüller, 1775)

Synonyms
- Crateronyx Duponchel, 1845

= Lemonia =

Genus of insects in the butterfly and moth order Lepidoptera

Lemonia is a genus of moths in the family Brahmaeidae (older classifications placed it in the separate family Lemoniidae.

== Species ==
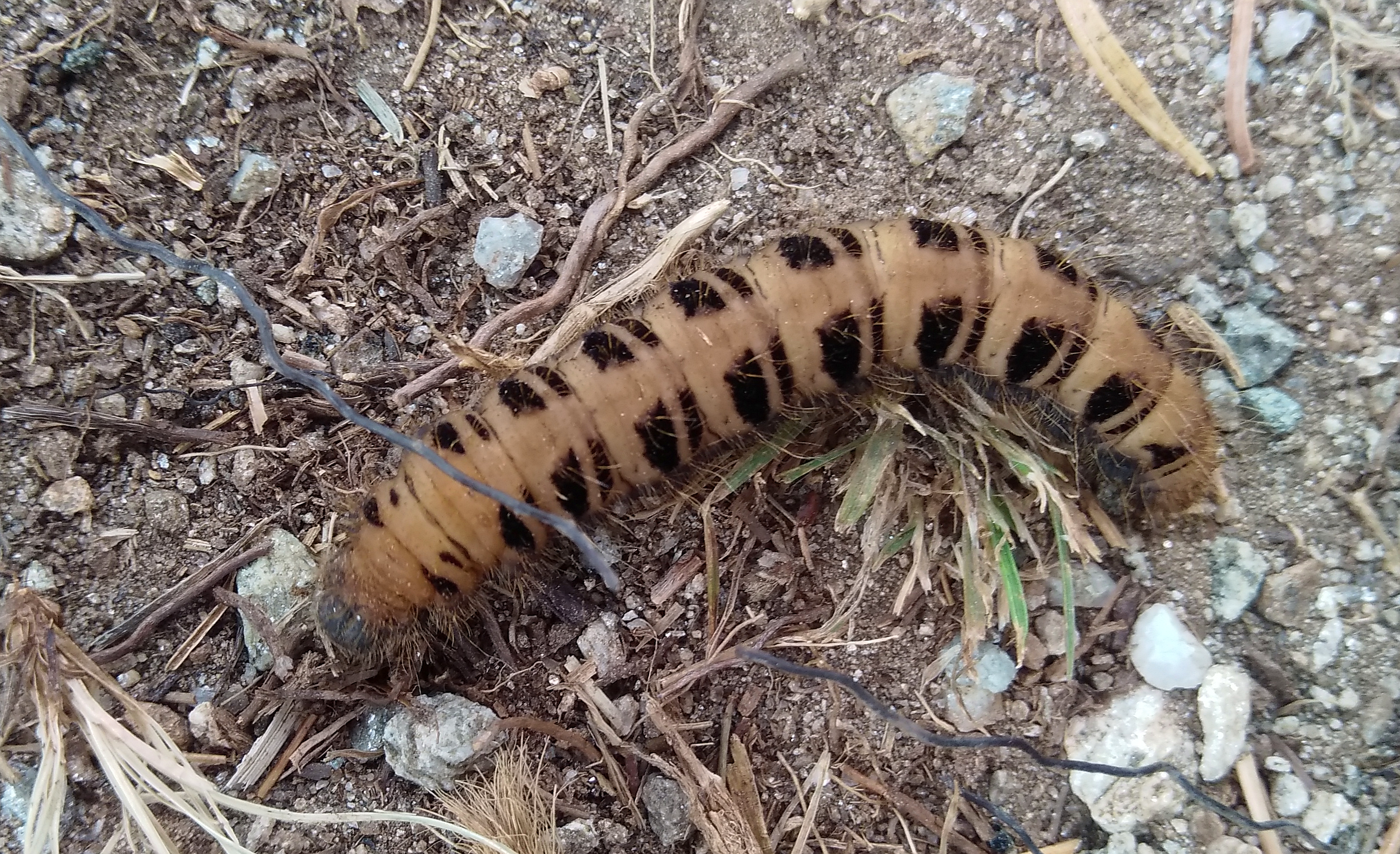
A caterpillar of Lemonia sp.

- Lemonia balcanica (Herrich-Schäffer, 1847)
- Lemonia ballioni (Christoph, 1888)
- Lemonia beirutica Daniel, 1965
- Lemonia dumi (Linnaeus, 1761)
- Lemonia pauli Staudinger, 1894
- Lemonia peilei Rothschild, 1921
  - Lemonia peilei farsica Wiltshire, 1946
  - Lemonia peilei klapperichi Wiltshire, 1961 (Turkmenistan)
  - Lemonia peilei peilei
  - Lemonia peilei talhouki Wiltshire, 1952
- Lemonia philopalus Donzel, 1842
- Lemonia pia Püngeler, 1902
  - Lemonia pia friedeli Witt, 1979
  - Lemonia pia pia
- Lemonia ponticus (Aurivillius, 1894)
- Lemonia sacrosancta Püngeler, 1902
- Lemonia sardanapalus Staudinger, 1887 (Turkmenistan)
- Lemonia strigata Rebel, 1910
- Lemonia taraxaci (Denis & Schiffermüller, 1775)
- Lemonia vallantini Oberthür, 1890
