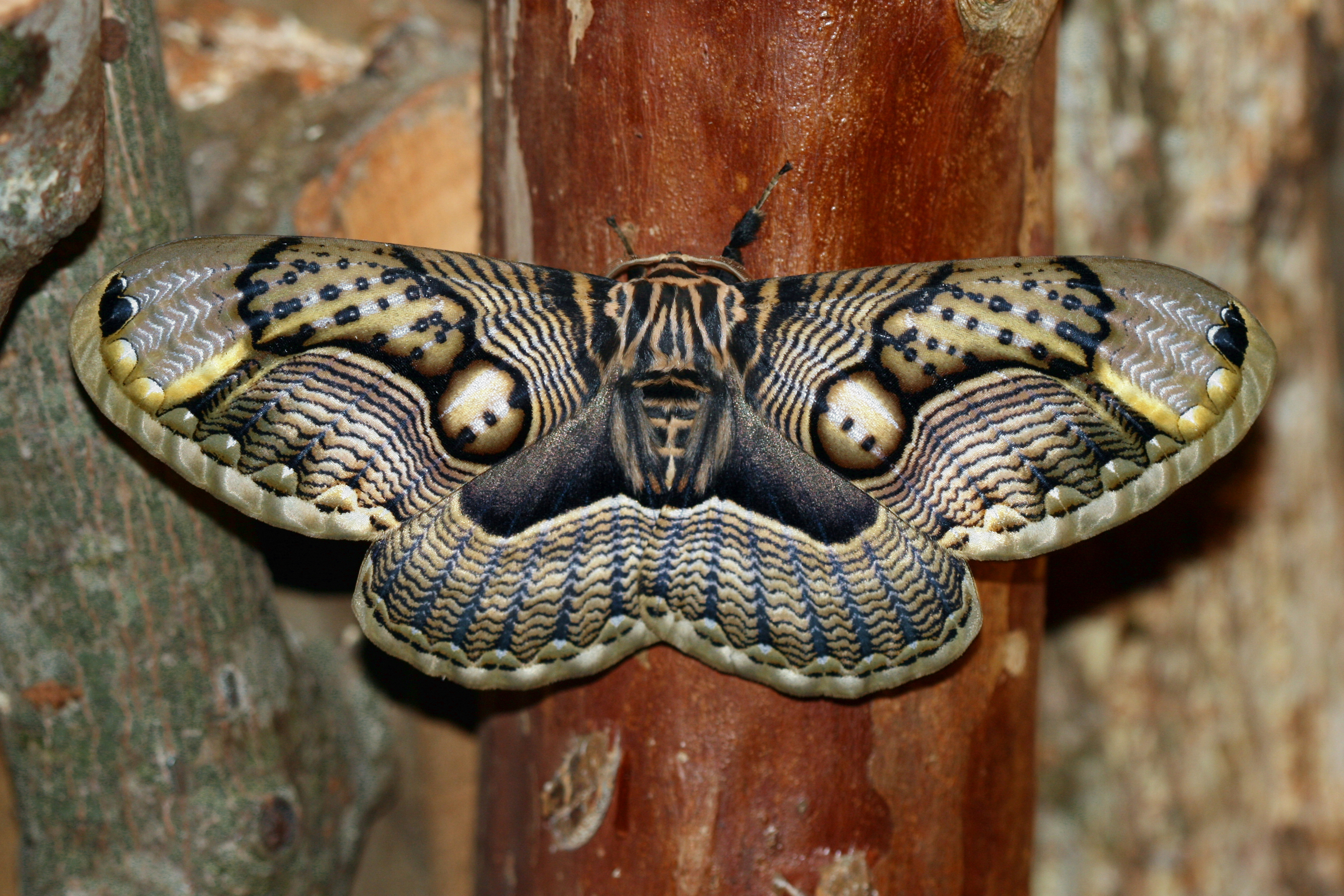
- Brahmaea wallichii

Scientific classification
- Kingdom: Animalia
- Phylum: Arthropoda
- Class: Insecta
- Order: Lepidoptera
- Family: Brahmaeidae
- Genus: Brahmaea; Walker, 1855

Synonyms
- Brahmophthalma Mell, 1930; Brahmaeops Bryk, 1949; Acanthobrahmaea Sauter, 1967

= Brahmaea =

Genus of moths

Brahmaea is a genus of moths of the family Brahmaeidae. Acanthobrahmaea, Brahmidia, and Brachygnatha are synonyms. Acanthobrahmaea has sometimes been considered a subgenus, describing an endemic relict species that only occurs in the vicinity of the Monte Vulture in Italy.

== Species ==
- Brahmaea ardjoeno (Kalis, 1934)
- Brahmaea europaea (Hartig, 1963)
- Brahmaea celebica Toxopeus, 1939
- Brahmaea certhia (Fabricius, 1793)
- Brahmaea christophi Staudinger, 1879
- Brahmaea hearseyi (White, 1862)
- Brahmaea japonica (Butler, 1873)
- Brahmaea ledereri (Rogenhofer, 1873)
- Brahmaea litserra H.L. Hao, X.R. Zhang & J.K. Yang, 2002
- Brahmaea loeffleri Naumann & Brosch, 2005
- Brahmaea naessigi Naumann & Brosch, 2005
- Brahmaea paukstadtorum Naumann & Brosch, 2005
- Brahmidia polymehntas H.L. Hao, X.R. Zhang & J.K. Yang, 2002
- Brahmaea tancrei (Austaut, 1896)
- Brahmaea wallichii (Gray, 1831)

See also Brachygnatha diastemata, found in China (Shaanxi).Zhang & Yang, 1993
