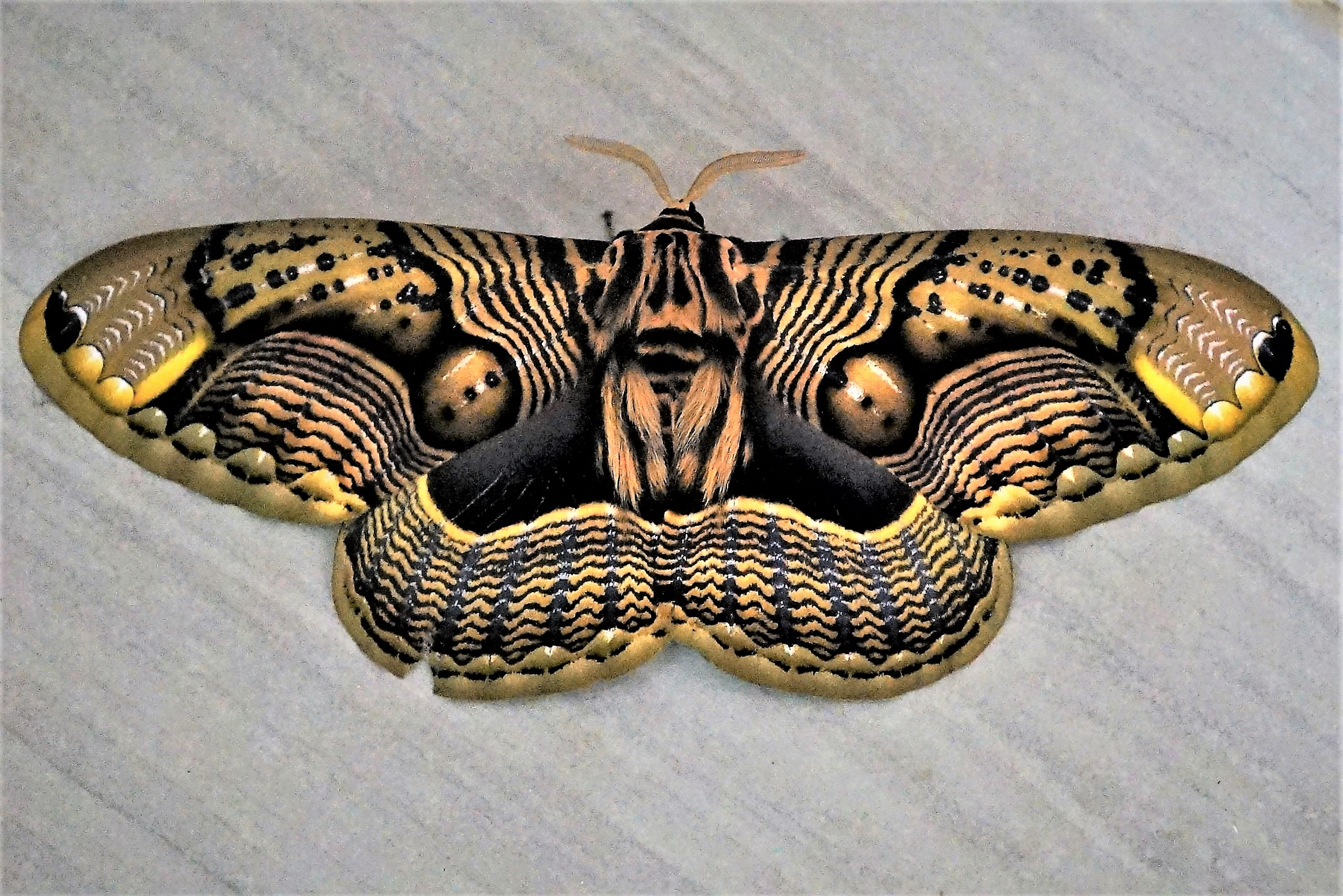
- Subspecies B. w. insulata

Scientific classification
- Kingdom: Animalia
- Phylum: Arthropoda
- Clade: Pancrustacea
- Class: Insecta
- Order: Lepidoptera
- Family: Brahmaeidae
- Genus: Brahmaea
- Species: B. wallichii

Binomial name
- Brahmaea wallichii Gray, 1831

Synonyms
- Bombyx wallichii Gray, 1831; Brahmaea conchifera Butler, 1880; Brahmophthalma wallichii

= Brahmaea wallichii =

Species of moth

Brahmaea wallichii, also known as the owl moth, is a moth from the family Brahmaeidae, the Brahmin moths, and one of its largest species. It is found in the north of India, Pakistan, Nepal, Bhutan, Myanmar, China, Taiwan, and Japan. The owl moth is nocturnal. The wingspan is about 90–160 millimetres (3 1/2–6 1/4 inches).

== Appearance ==
The moth has well-developed eye spots on the front wings and a characteristic pattern of black-brown stripes. The light-brown margins of the back wings display small triangular white spots. The robust body is also black and brown, with characteristic orange-brown stripes.

== Etymology ==
The species is named after the botanist Nathaniel Wallich.

== Behavior ==
The larvae feed on Fraxinus excelsior, Ligustrum and common lilac. In captivity they also feed on elderberry. They are able to neutralize plant toxins produced by Ligustrum.

The moths are active at night; during the daytime, they rest with outspread wings on tree trunks or on the ground. When disturbed, the moth does not fly away, but fiercely shakes.

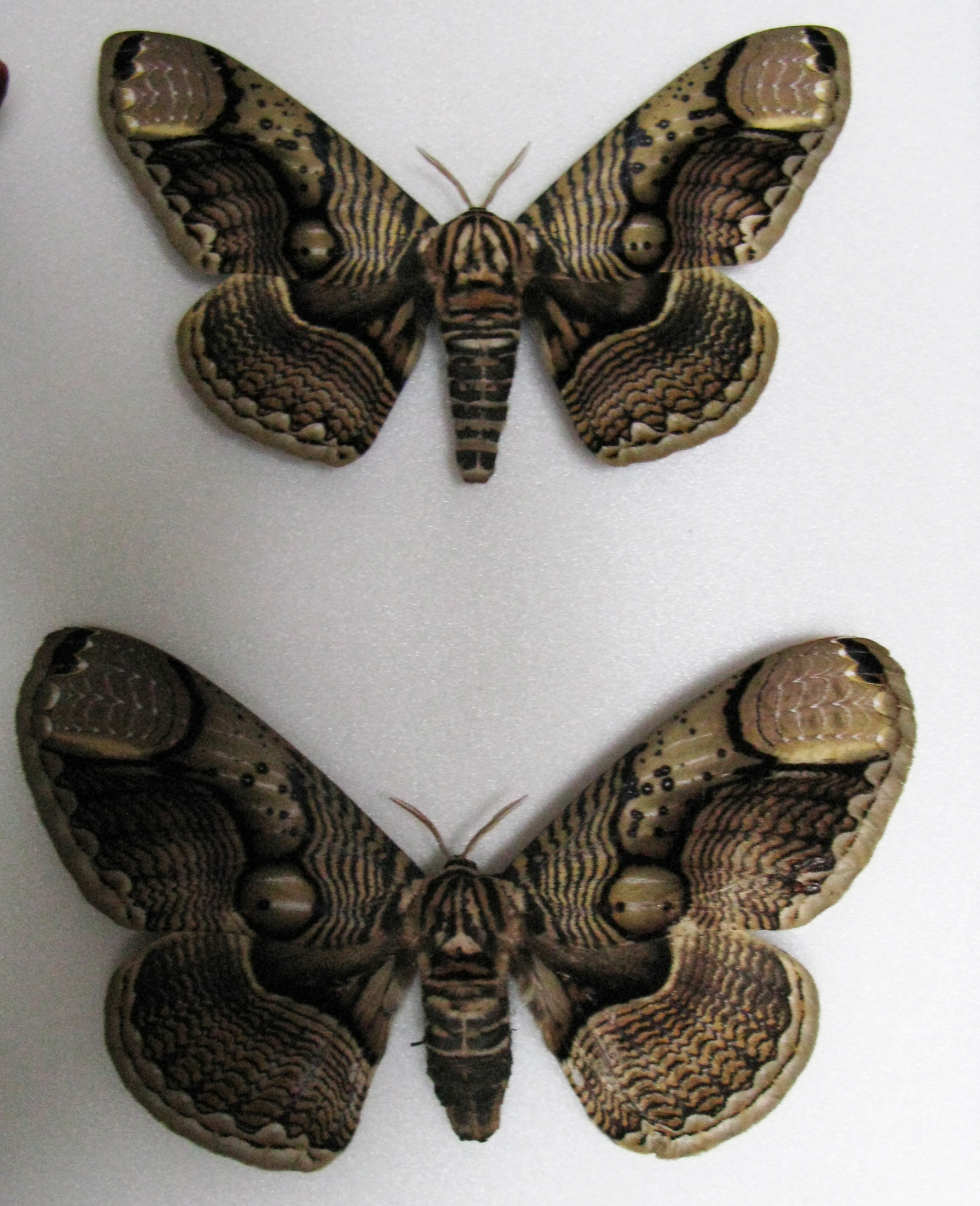
Mounted pair

== Habitat ==
The habitat is both tropical and temperate forests.

== Subspecies ==
- Brahmaea wallichii wallichii
- Brahmaea wallichii insulata Inoue, 1984 (Taiwan)
- Brahmaea wallichii saifulica de Freina, 1983 (western Himalaya)
