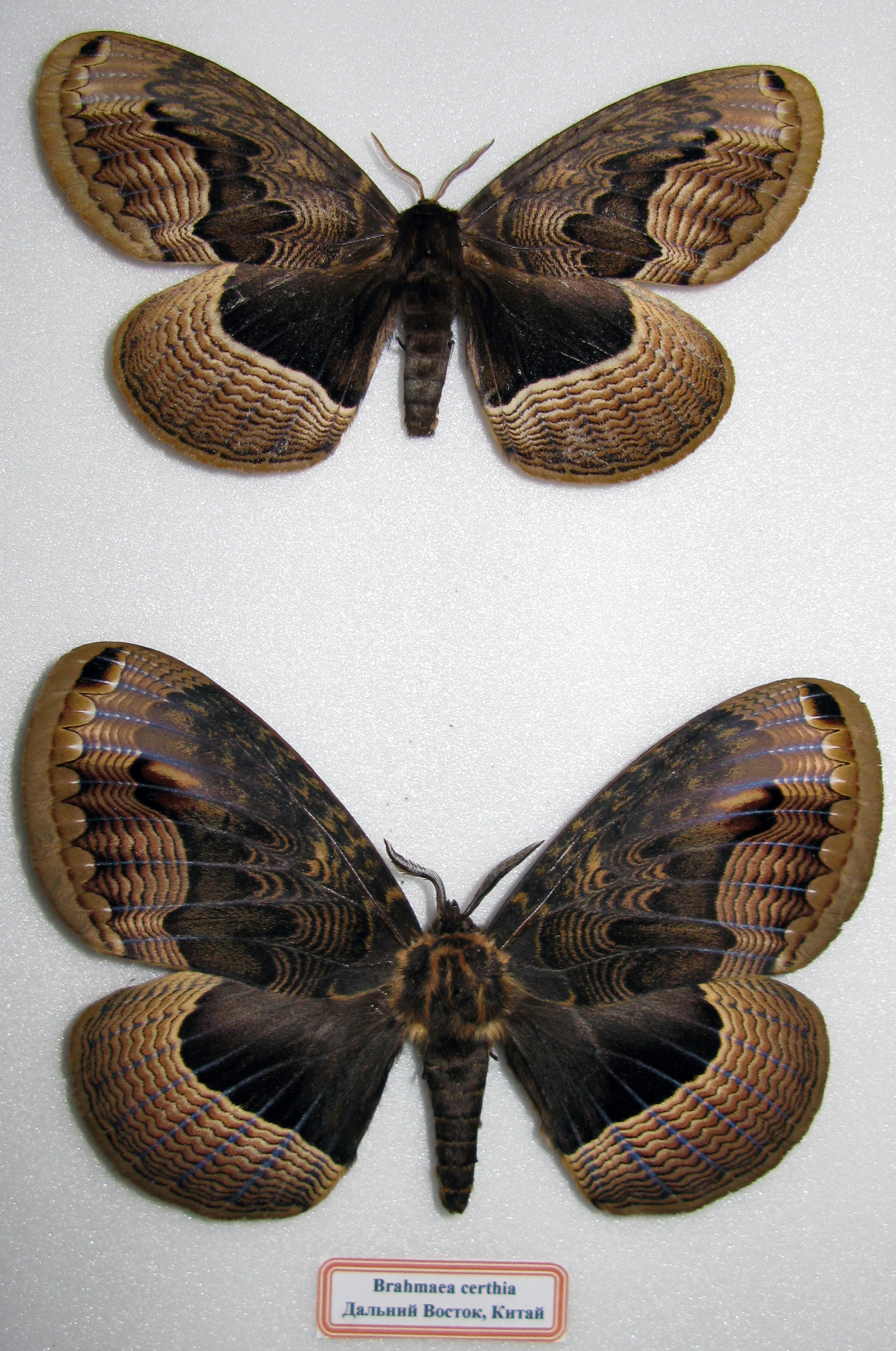

Scientific classification
- Kingdom: Animalia
- Phylum: Arthropoda
- Class: Insecta
- Order: Lepidoptera
- Family: Brahmaeidae
- Genus: Brahmaea
- Species: B. certhia

Binomial name
- Brahmaea certhia Fabricius, 1793

= Brahmaea certhia =

Species of moth

Brahmaea certhia, the Sino-Korean owl moth, is a moth from the family Brahmaeidae, the Brahmin moths. It is found in the Korean Peninsula and China.

The wingspan is 100 mm (3.9 in) to 120 mm (4.7 in). “A 2022 thermographic study found that the surface temperatures of the brahmin moth (Brahmaea certhia) differ significantly from those of the hawk moth Theretra oldenlandiae, suggesting species-specific warm-up or thermoregulatory patterns as measured by infrared camera" (Kim 2022). The larvae feed on privet, Fraxinus mandshurica and Syringa amurensis.
