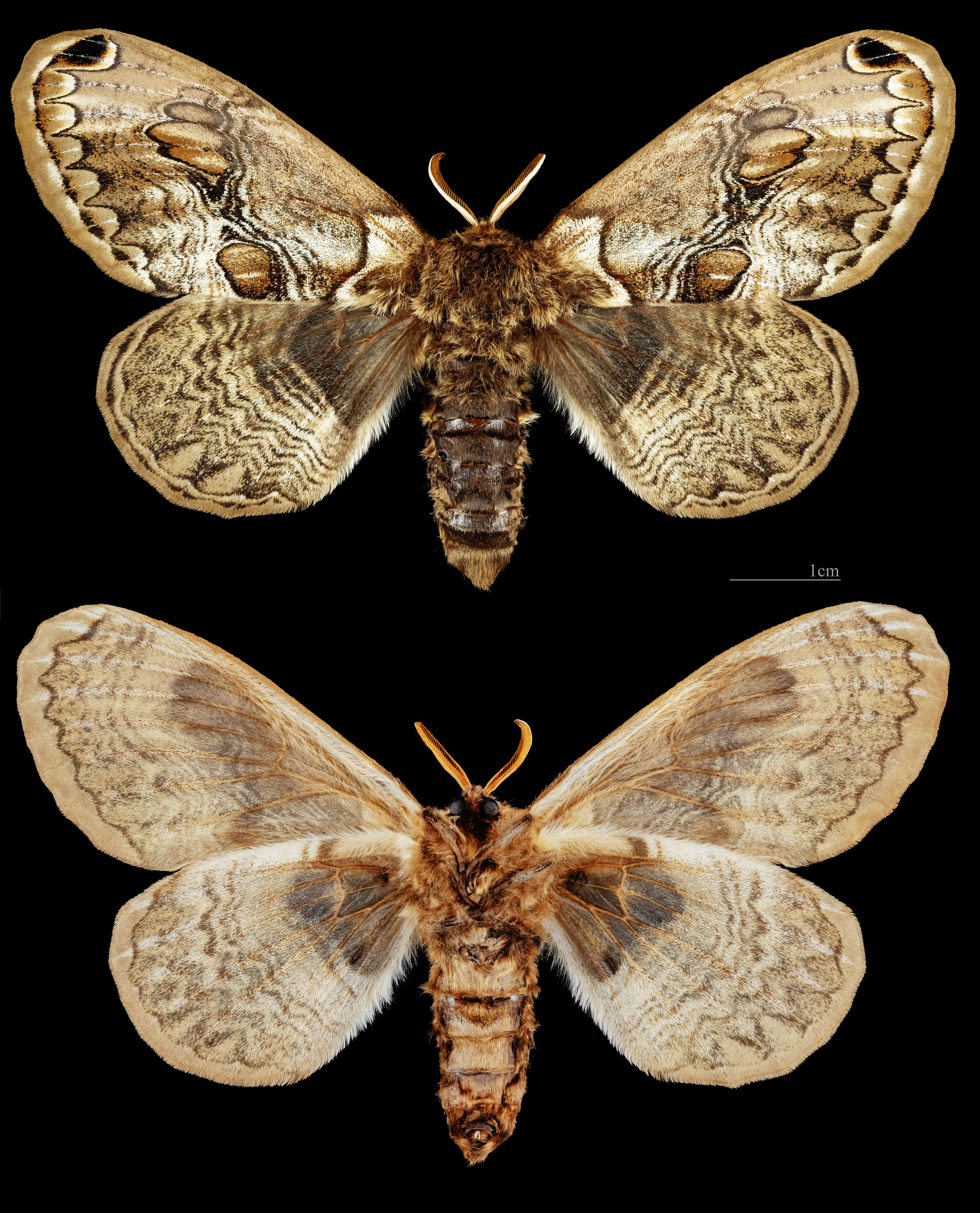

Conservation status
- Endangered (IUCN 3.1)

Scientific classification
- Kingdom: Animalia
- Phylum: Arthropoda
- Clade: Pancrustacea
- Class: Insecta
- Order: Lepidoptera
- Family: Brahmaeidae
- Genus: Brahmaea
- Species: B. europaea

Binomial name
- Brahmaea europaea Hartig, 1963

= Brahmaea europaea =

Species of moth

Brahmaea (Acanthobrahmaea) europaea, the European owl moth, is a lepidopteran from the family Brahmaeidae, in the subgenus Acanthobrahmaea.

== Taxonomy ==
B. europaea is the sole species in the genus Brahmaea in Europe. Most members of the genus are found in eastern Asia. The species can be identified by wing veins in adults and pupal dorsal spines on abdominal segments. The species was originally described as Acanthobrahmaea europaea in 1963, but Acanthobrahmaea later became a subgenus.

== Distribution and habitat ==
The species can only be found in southern Italy. Their habitat consists of broad leaf woods in mountainous areas at elevations of 200 to 800 metres, in semi-deciduous and undisturbed woodlands. Habitat fragmentation, light pollution, clearing of forest underbrush, and collection of rare species are likely factors affecting B. europaea's distribution and abundance, and contribute to its current IUCN endangered status. Wild boar can also consume both host plants and pupae in the ground.

== Life cycle ==
Adults fly from late March to early May. Adults are active after sunset and are cold-tolerant enough to be seen flying during snowfall. Adults lay eggs on the trunks of plants within Oleaceae, including Fraxinus angustifolia, Phyllirea latifolia, and Ligustrum vulgare in captivity.

Eggs hatch at the end of March and April 12 to 15 days after oviposition. The larvae move to the top of the plant and move downwards as leaves are consumed. Larvae may move to other plants depending on size. Larvae undergo five instars, pupate on the ground where they overwinter, and emerge as adults the following spring.
