= Friedrich Hartig =

Italian entomologist (1900–1980)

Friedrich Maria Heinrich Anton Franz-Joseph Hartig or Federico Hartig (29 August 1900, Bolzano – 24 June 1980, Merano) was an Italian entomologist who specialised in Lepidoptera.

Friedrich Hartig was a Reichsgraf. In 1963 he discovered the European owl moth.

== Publications ==
Partial list (commenced):

- Microlepidotteri della Venezia Tridentina e delle regioni adiacenti. Parte III. (Fam. Gelechiidae-Micropterygidae). Studi Trentini delle Scienze Naturali, Acta Biologia 41(3-4): 1–292.
