= Brahmaeidae =

- Dactyloceras lucina male

Scientific classification
- Kingdom: Animalia
- Phylum: Arthropoda
- Clade: Pancrustacea
- Class: Insecta
- Order: Lepidoptera
- Superfamily: Bombycoidea
- Family: Brahmaeidae; Swinhoe, 1892

Genera
- See text

Family of moths

Brahmaeidae is a family of insects in the order Lepidoptera, commonly known as Brahmin moths. It includes species formerly included in the family Lemoniidae.

== Diversity ==
The family consists of 9 genera.

== Genera ==
- Brahmaea
- Calliprogonos
- Dactyloceras
- Lemonia
- Sabalia
- Spiramiopsis
