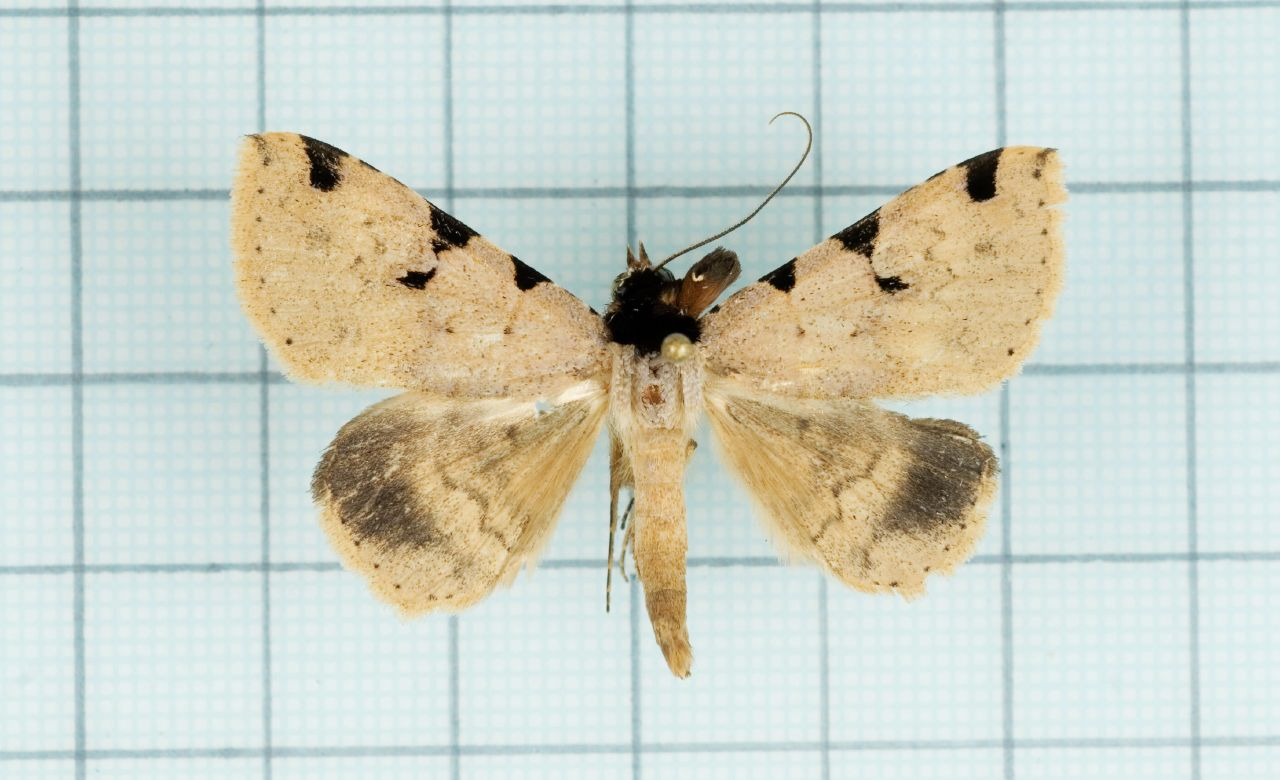

Scientific classification
- Kingdom: Animalia
- Phylum: Arthropoda
- Class: Insecta
- Order: Lepidoptera
- Superfamily: Noctuoidea
- Family: Erebidae
- Genus: Rema
- Species: R. costimacula

Binomial name
- Rema costimacula (Guenee, 1852)

Synonyms
- Toxocampa costimacula Guenee, 1852; Toxocampa avisignata Prout, 1924; Remigia triangulata Walker, 1865

= Rema costimacula =

Species of moth

Rema costimacula is a species of moth of the family Erebidae first described by Achille Guenée in 1852. It is found in the north-eastern Himalayas, Thailand, Peninsular Malaysia, Sumatra, Borneo and Sulawesi.

The larvae feed on Amphicarpaea species.

== Subspecies ==
- Rema costimacula costimacula
- Rema costimacula triangulata Walker, 1865 (Himalayas)
