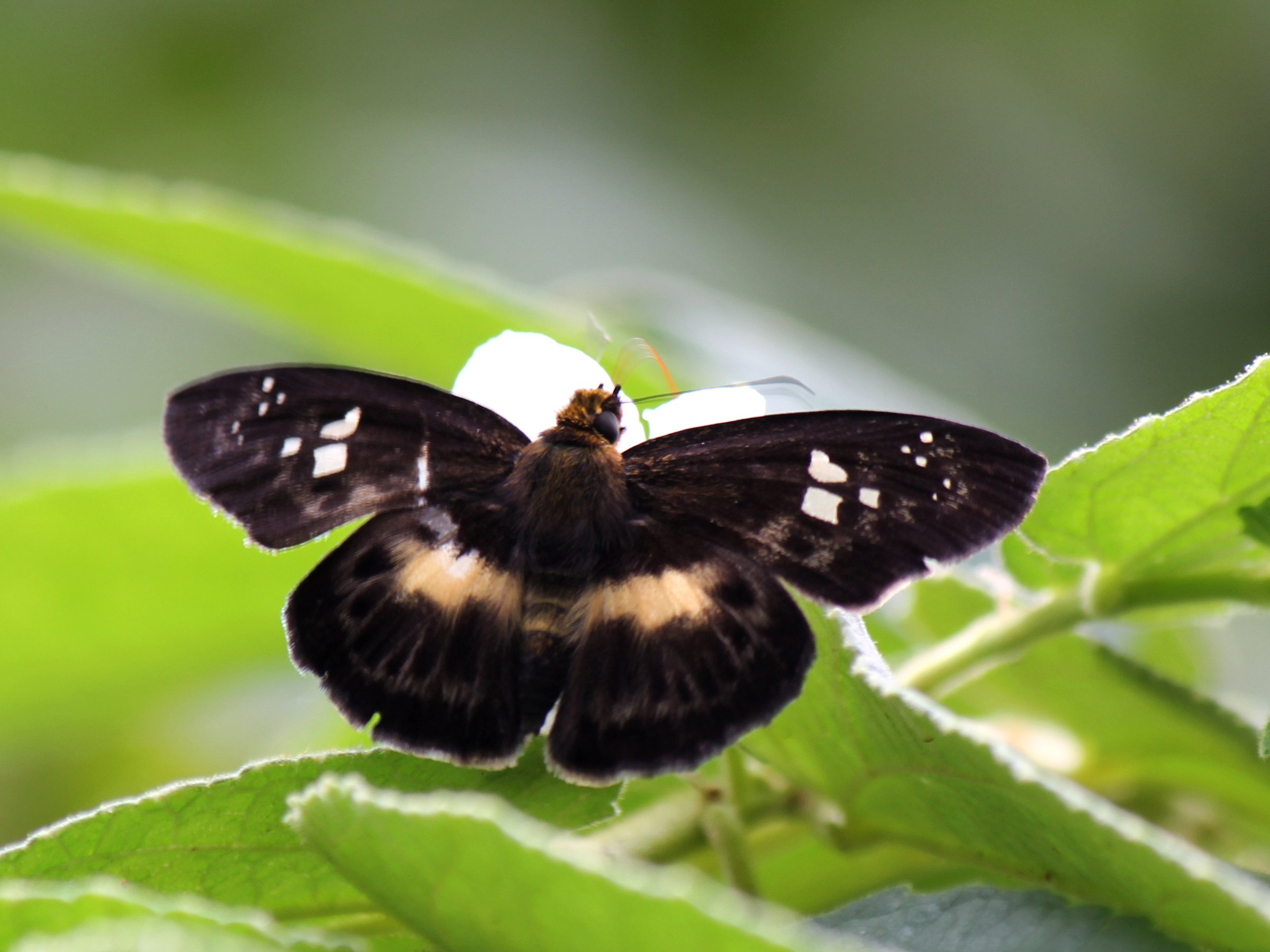
- Gerosis celebica

Scientific classification
- Kingdom: Animalia
- Phylum: Arthropoda
- Class: Insecta
- Order: Lepidoptera
- Family: Hesperiidae
- Tribe: Tagiadini
- Genus: Gerosis; Mabille, 1903

= Gerosis =

Genus of butterflies

Gerosis is an Indomalayan genus of spread-winged skippers in the family Hesperiidae.There are six species found from China and Northeast India to Java and the Sula Archipelago east of Sulawesi.They are lowland (less than 650 metres) forest (primary or advanced secondary) butterflies. They seek sunny areas between 1 and 4 metres above ground, but females can be encountered in the shade.

== Species ==
- Gerosis bhagava (Moore, [1866])
- Gerosis limax (Plötz, 1884) Burma, Thailand, Malay Peninsula, Singapore, Borneo, Sumatra
- Gerosis phisara (Moore, 1884)
- Gerosis sinica (C. & R. Felder, 1862) North East India Burma, Laos, Thailand, South and Central China, Yunnan
- Gerosis yuani Huang, 2003 Yunnan
- Gerosis tristis (Eliot, 1959) Malaya, Vietnam
- Gerosis corona (Semper, 1892) Philippines
- Gerosis celebica (C. & R. Felder, [1867]) Celebes

== Biology ==
The larvae feed on Leguminosae including Abrus, Amphicarpaea, Dalbergia
