= Trigonodesma =

Trigonodesma may refer to:

- Trigonodesma (bivalve) Wood, 1864, a genus of fossil bivalves in the family Noetiidae
- Trigonodesma (moth) Wileman & South, 1921, a genus of moths in the family Noctuidae
