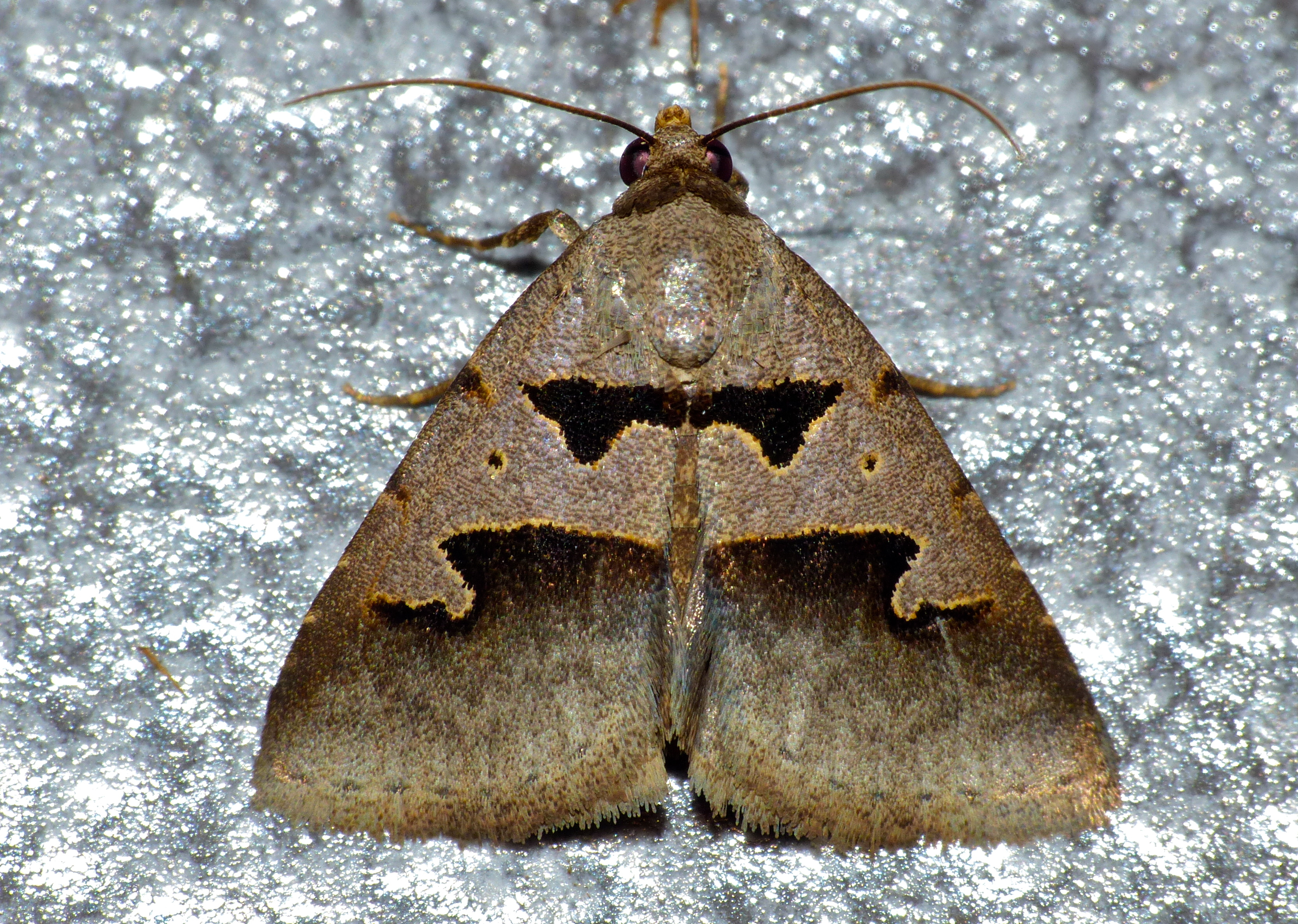
- Anobinae

Scientific classification
- Kingdom: Animalia
- Phylum: Arthropoda
- Clade: Pancrustacea
- Class: Insecta
- Order: Lepidoptera
- Superfamily: Noctuoidea
- Family: Erebidae
- Subfamily: Anobinae; Holloway, 2005

= Anobinae =

Subfamily of moths

The Anobinae are a subfamily of moths in the family Erebidae described by Jeremy Daniel Holloway in 2005. Common morphological characteristics of Anobine moths include a dark head and prothoracic collar, lighter color on the thorax, and either bipectinate antennae or antennae with flagellomeral setae in males.

== Genera ==
- Anoba – type genus
- Baniana
- Deinopa
- Lephana
- Marcipa
- Plecoptera
- Rema
