= Deinopa =

Scientific classification
- Kingdom: Animalia
- Phylum: Arthropoda
- Class: Insecta
- Order: Lepidoptera
- Superfamily: Noctuoidea
- Family: Erebidae
- Subfamily: Anobinae
- Genus: Deinopa; Walker, 1856

Synonyms
- Poesula Walker, 1858; Asthana Walker, 1862; Rethma Walker, 1866

Genus of moths

Deinopa is a genus of moths of the family Erebidae erected by Francis Walker in 1856. The genus was previously classified in the subfamily Calpinae of the family Noctuidae.

== Species ==
- Deinopa angitia (Druce, 1891) Mexico
- Deinopa delinquens (Walker, 1858) Brazil (Amazonas)
- Deinopa erecta (Walker, 1862)
- Deinopa notabilis Walker, 1856 – type species
- Deinopa signiplena Walker, 1862
- Deinopa transcissaria (Walker, 1866) Brazil (Amazonas)
