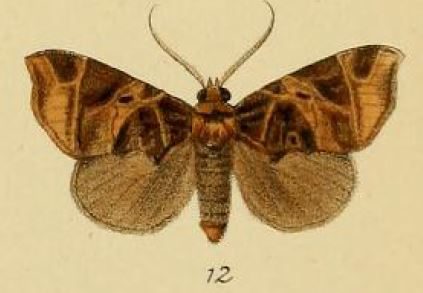
- Marcipa talusina

Scientific classification
- Kingdom: Animalia
- Phylum: Arthropoda
- Clade: Pancrustacea
- Class: Insecta
- Order: Lepidoptera
- Superfamily: Noctuoidea
- Family: Erebidae
- Subfamily: Anobinae
- Genus: Marcipa; Walker, 1855

Synonyms
- Birtha Walker, 1865

= Marcipa =

Genus of moths

Marcipa is a genus of moths of the family Erebidae.

== Species ==
- Marcipa accentifera (Pelletier 1975)
- Marcipa achyropa (Viette 1958)
- Marcipa acuta (Prout 1927)
- Marcipa acutangula (Pelletier 1975)
- Marcipa aequatorialis (Pelletier 1975)
- Marcipa alternata (Gaede 1939)
- Marcipa amaba (Hampson 1926)
- Marcipa amaniensis (Pelletier 1978)
- Marcipa angulina (Mabille 1881)
- Marcipa apicalis (Hampson 1926)
- Marcipa argillacea (Holland 1894)
- Marcipa argyrosema (Hampson 1926)
- Marcipa argyrosemioides (Pelletier 1975)
- Marcipa bergeri (Pelletier 1975)
- Marcipa bernardii (Pelletier 1974)
- Marcipa bistriata (Pelletier 1978)
- Marcipa brunnescens (Pelletier 1978)
- Marcipa bullifera (Viette 1958)
- Marcipa callaxantha (Kenrick 1917)
- Marcipa camerunica (Pelletier 1978)
- Marcipa carcassoni (Pelletier 1975)
- Marcipa catoxantha (Holland 1894)
- Marcipa contorta (Viette 1958)
- Marcipa crocataria (Pelletier 1978)
- Marcipa curvilinea (Pelletier 1978)
- Marcipa dargei (Pelletier 1978)
- Marcipa dentimacula (Pelletier 1978)
- Marcipa dimera (Hampson 1926)
- Marcipa disrupta (Hampson 1926)
- Marcipa douala (Pelletier 1975)
- Marcipa dubia (Pelletier 1978)
- Marcipa endoselene (Hampson 1926)
- Marcipa eucrines (Bethune-Baker 1911)
- Marcipa flavealis (Pelletier 1978)
- Marcipa flavilinea (Pelletier 1978)
- Marcipa gabonensis (Pelletier 1978)
- Marcipa heterospila (Hampson 1910)
- Marcipa holmi (Fletcher 1961)
- Marcipa inscripta (Walker 1855)
- Marcipa insulata (Walker 1865)
- Marcipa kasai (Pelletier 1978)
- Marcipa kirdii (Pelletier 1975)
- Marcipa liberta (Viette 1958)
- Marcipa lutearia (Pelletier 1978)
- Marcipa maculifera (Mabille 1881)
- Marcipa maculiferoides (Strand 1914)
- Marcipa madagascariensis (Pelletier 1978)
- Marcipa madegassa (Viette 1958)
- Marcipa magniplaga (Hampson 1926)
- Marcipa makokouensis (Pelletier 1978)
- Marcipa mariaeclarae (Pelletier 1975)
- Marcipa mediana (Hampson 1926)
- Marcipa miraja (Viette 1958)
- Marcipa molybdea (Hampson 1926)
- Marcipa monosema (Hampson 1926)
- Marcipa nigropunctifera (Fletcher & Viette 1955)
- Marcipa nimba (Pelletier 1978)
- Marcipa noel (Viette 1966)
- Marcipa nyei (Pelletier 1978)
- Marcipa orientalis (Pelletier 1978)
- Marcipa pammicta (Bethune-Baker 1911)
- Marcipa phaeodonta (Hampson 1926)
- Marcipa pinheyi (Pelletier 1975)
- Marcipa plantei (Pelletier 1978)
- Marcipa pulchra (Pelletier 1978)
- Marcipa pyramidalis (Hampson 1910)
- Marcipa rotundiplaga (Gaede 1939)
- Marcipa rougeoti (Pelletier 1974)
- Marcipa ruptisigna (Hampson 1926)
- Marcipa secticona (Hampson 1926)
- Marcipa semilunata (Pelletier 1978)
- Marcipa silvicola (Viette 1966)
- Marcipa splendens (Pelletier 1975)
- Marcipa talusina (Schaus 1893)
- Marcipa transversata (Holland 1894)
- Marcipa trista (Pelletier 1978)
- Marcipa truncata (Pelletier 1978)
- Marcipa viettei (Pelletier 1975)
- Marcipa vuattouxi (Pelletier 1978)
- Marcipa xanthomochla (Fletcher 1963)
