= Marcipa mediana =

Scientific classification
- Kingdom: Animalia
- Phylum: Arthropoda
- Clade: Pancrustacea
- Class: Insecta
- Order: Lepidoptera
- Superfamily: Noctuoidea
- Family: Erebidae
- Genus: Marcipa
- Species: M. mediana

Binomial name
- Marcipa mediana Hampson, 1926

Species of moth

Marcipa mediana is a species of moth in the family Erebidae. It is found in Africa, including South Africa and Tanzania.
