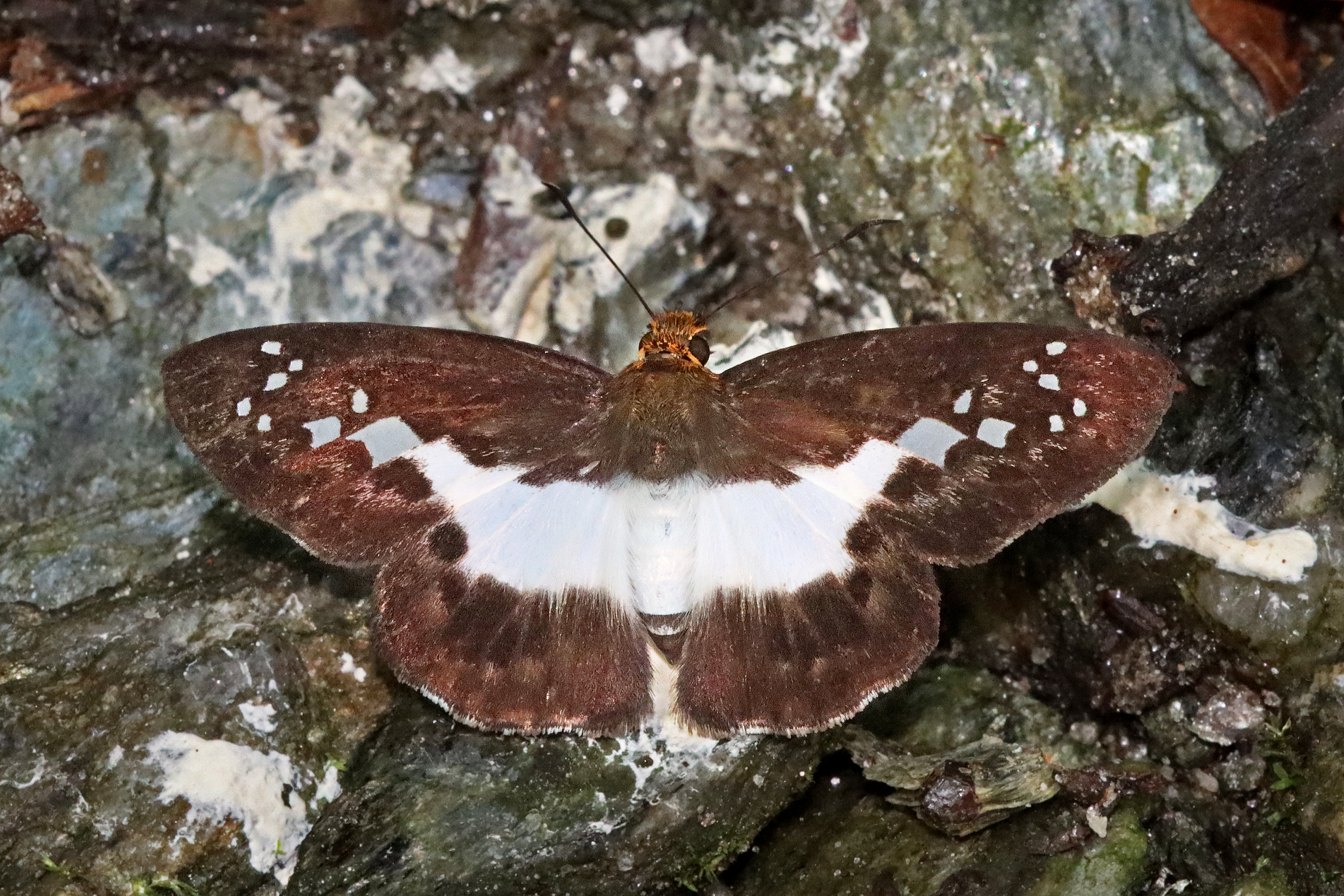

Scientific classification
- Kingdom: Animalia
- Phylum: Arthropoda
- Clade: Pancrustacea
- Class: Insecta
- Order: Lepidoptera
- Family: Hesperiidae
- Genus: Gerosis
- Species: G. sinica

Binomial name
- Gerosis sinica C. & R. Felder, 1862

= Gerosis sinica =

White yellow-breasted flat

Species of butterfly

Gerosis sinica, commonly known as the white yellow-breasted flat, is a species of butterfly belonging to the family Hesperiidae.

== Distribution ==
The species is found in India, Bangladesh, Bhutan, China, Myanmar, Laos, Thailand, Vietnam and Malaysia.

== Subspecies ==
The major subspecies of Gerosis sinica are:

- Gerosis sinica narada (Moore, 1884) – Sikkimese white yellow-breasted flat
- Gerosis sinica minima (Swinhoe, 1912)

== See also ==
- List of butterflies of India
