= Marcipa orientalis =

Scientific classification
- Kingdom: Animalia
- Phylum: Arthropoda
- Clade: Pancrustacea
- Class: Insecta
- Order: Lepidoptera
- Superfamily: Noctuoidea
- Family: Erebidae
- Genus: Marcipa
- Species: M. orientalis

Binomial name
- Marcipa orientalis Pelletier, 1978

Species of moth

Marcipa orientalis is a species of moth in the family Erebidae. It is found in Tanzania.
