= Marcipa lutearia =

Scientific classification
- Kingdom: Animalia
- Phylum: Arthropoda
- Clade: Pancrustacea
- Class: Insecta
- Order: Lepidoptera
- Superfamily: Noctuoidea
- Family: Erebidae
- Genus: Marcipa
- Species: M. lutearia

Binomial name
- Marcipa lutearia Pelletier, 1978

Species of moth

Marcipa lutearia is a species of moth in the family Erebidae. It is found in Africa, including Cameroon and Nigeria.
