= Rema tetraspila =

Scientific classification
- Kingdom: Animalia
- Phylum: Arthropoda
- Clade: Pancrustacea
- Class: Insecta
- Order: Lepidoptera
- Superfamily: Noctuoidea
- Family: Erebidae
- Genus: Rema
- Species: R. tetraspila

Binomial name
- Rema tetraspila Walker, 1865

Species of moth

Rema tetraspila is a moth of the family Erebidae. The genus was erected by Francis Walker in 1865.
