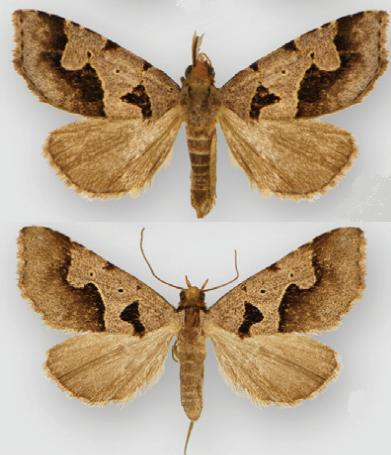

Scientific classification
- Domain: Eukaryota
- Kingdom: Animalia
- Phylum: Arthropoda
- Class: Insecta
- Order: Lepidoptera
- Superfamily: Noctuoidea
- Family: Erebidae
- Genus: Baniana
- Species: B. gobar

Binomial name
- Baniana gobar H. Druce, in Godman and Salvin, 1898

= Baniana gobar =

Species of moth

Baniana gobar is a species of moth of the family Erebidae first described by Herbert Druce in 1898. It is found in Mexico.
