= Rema bimacula =

Scientific classification
- Kingdom: Animalia
- Phylum: Arthropoda
- Clade: Pancrustacea
- Class: Insecta
- Order: Lepidoptera
- Superfamily: Noctuoidea
- Family: Erebidae
- Genus: Rema
- Species: R. bimacula

Binomial name
- Rema bimacula (Wileman & South, 1921)

Synonyms
- Trigonodesma bimacula Wileman & South, 1921

Species of moth

Rema bimacula is a species of moth in the family Erebidae. It is found in the Philippines. It was first described as Trigonodesma bimacula by Wileman and South in 1921.
