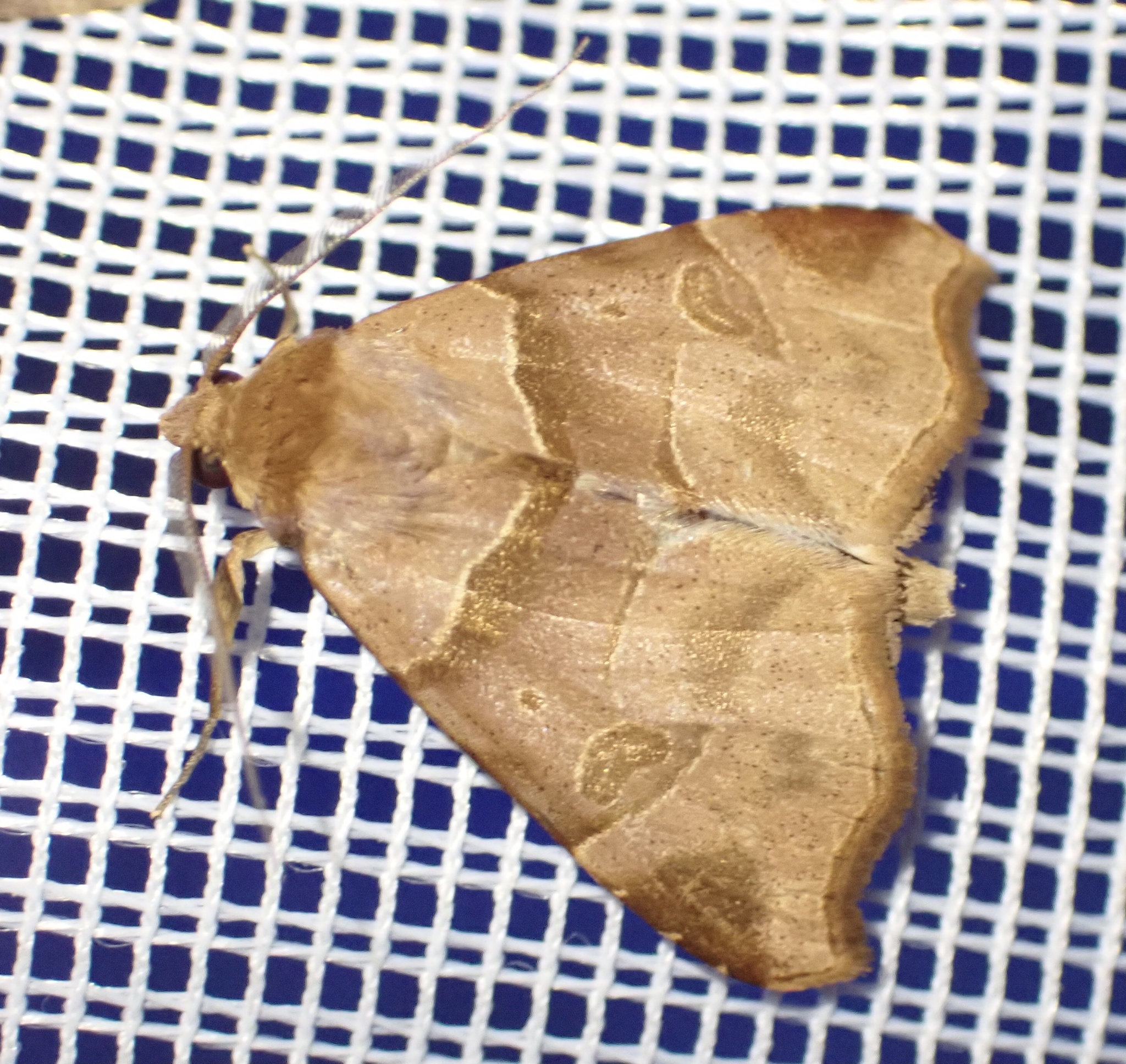

Scientific classification
- Kingdom: Animalia
- Phylum: Arthropoda
- Clade: Pancrustacea
- Class: Insecta
- Order: Lepidoptera
- Superfamily: Noctuoidea
- Family: Erebidae
- Genus: Marcipa
- Species: M. pammicta

Binomial name
- Marcipa pammicta Bethune-Baker, 1911

= Marcipa pammicta =

Species of moth

Marcipa pammicta is a species of moth in the family Erebidae. It is found in sub-Saharan Africa.
