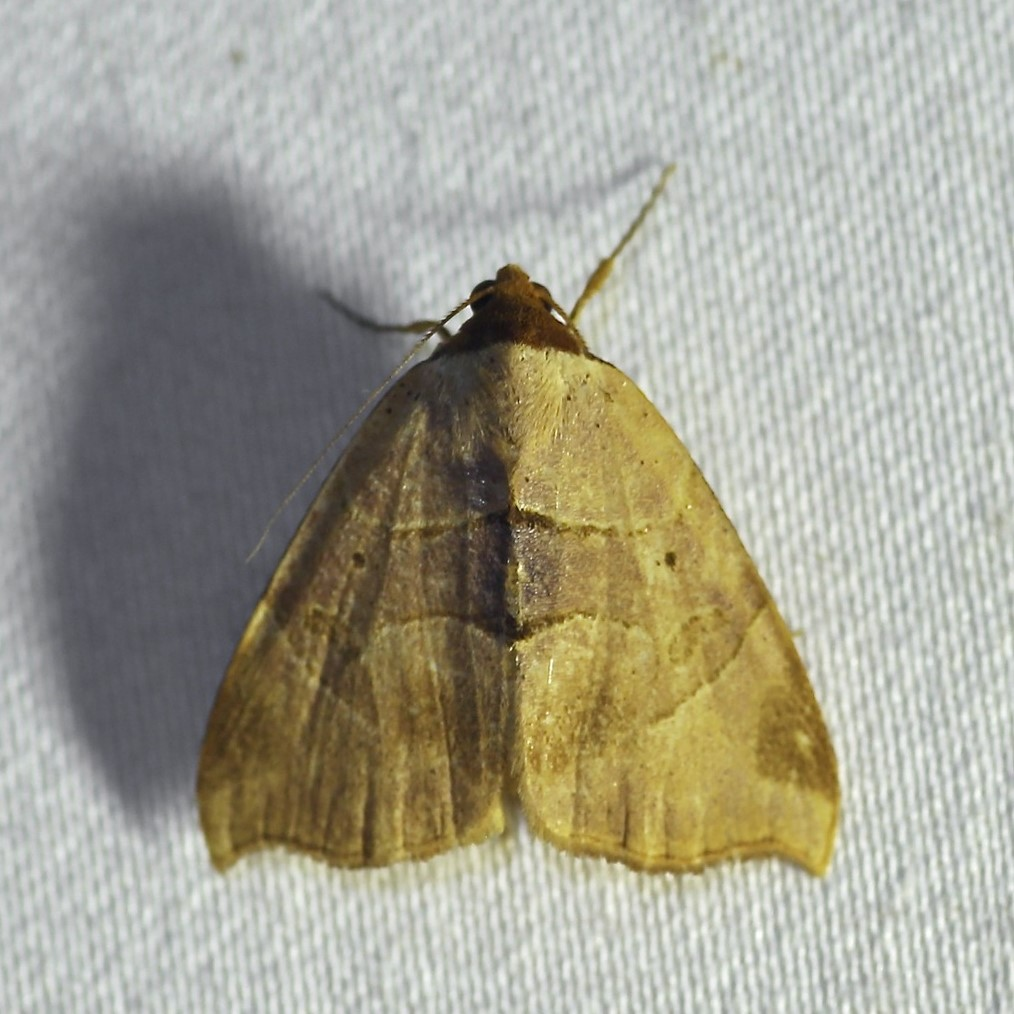

Scientific classification
- Kingdom: Animalia
- Phylum: Arthropoda
- Clade: Pancrustacea
- Class: Insecta
- Order: Lepidoptera
- Superfamily: Noctuoidea
- Family: Erebidae
- Genus: Marcipa
- Species: M. phaeodonta

Binomial name
- Marcipa phaeodonta Hampson, 1926

= Marcipa phaeodonta =

Species of moth

Marcipa phaeodonta is a species of moth in the family Erebidae. It is found in East Africa, including Malawi and Mozambique.
