= Marcipa rotundiplaga =

Scientific classification
- Kingdom: Animalia
- Phylum: Arthropoda
- Clade: Pancrustacea
- Class: Insecta
- Order: Lepidoptera
- Superfamily: Noctuoidea
- Family: Erebidae
- Genus: Marcipa
- Species: M. rotundiplaga

Binomial name
- Marcipa rotundiplaga Gaede, 1939

Species of moth

Marcipa rotundiplaga is a species of moth in the family Erebidae. It is found in Africa, including Cameroon and Central African Republic.
