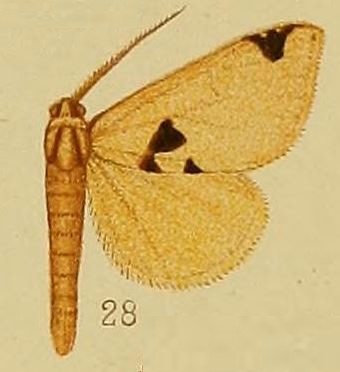

Scientific classification
- Kingdom: Animalia
- Phylum: Arthropoda
- Clade: Pancrustacea
- Class: Insecta
- Order: Lepidoptera
- Superfamily: Noctuoidea
- Family: Erebidae
- Genus: Marcipa
- Species: M. pyramidalis

Binomial name
- Marcipa pyramidalis Hampson, 1910

= Marcipa pyramidalis =

Species of moth

Marcipa pyramidalis is a species of moth in the family Erebidae. It is found in East Africa, including Kenya, Malawi, and Mozambique.
