= Marcipa mariaeclarae =

Scientific classification
- Kingdom: Animalia
- Phylum: Arthropoda
- Clade: Pancrustacea
- Class: Insecta
- Order: Lepidoptera
- Superfamily: Noctuoidea
- Family: Erebidae
- Genus: Marcipa
- Species: M. mariaeclarae

Binomial name
- Marcipa mariaeclarae Pelletier, 1975

Species of moth

Marcipa mariaeclarae is a species of moth in the family Erebidae. It is found in Africa, including Cameroon and Gabon.
