= Marcipa eucrines =

Scientific classification
- Kingdom: Animalia
- Phylum: Arthropoda
- Clade: Pancrustacea
- Class: Insecta
- Order: Lepidoptera
- Superfamily: Noctuoidea
- Family: Erebidae
- Genus: Marcipa
- Species: M. eucrines

Binomial name
- Marcipa eucrines Bethune-Baker, 1911

Species of moth

Marcipa eucrines is a species of moth in the family Erebidae.
