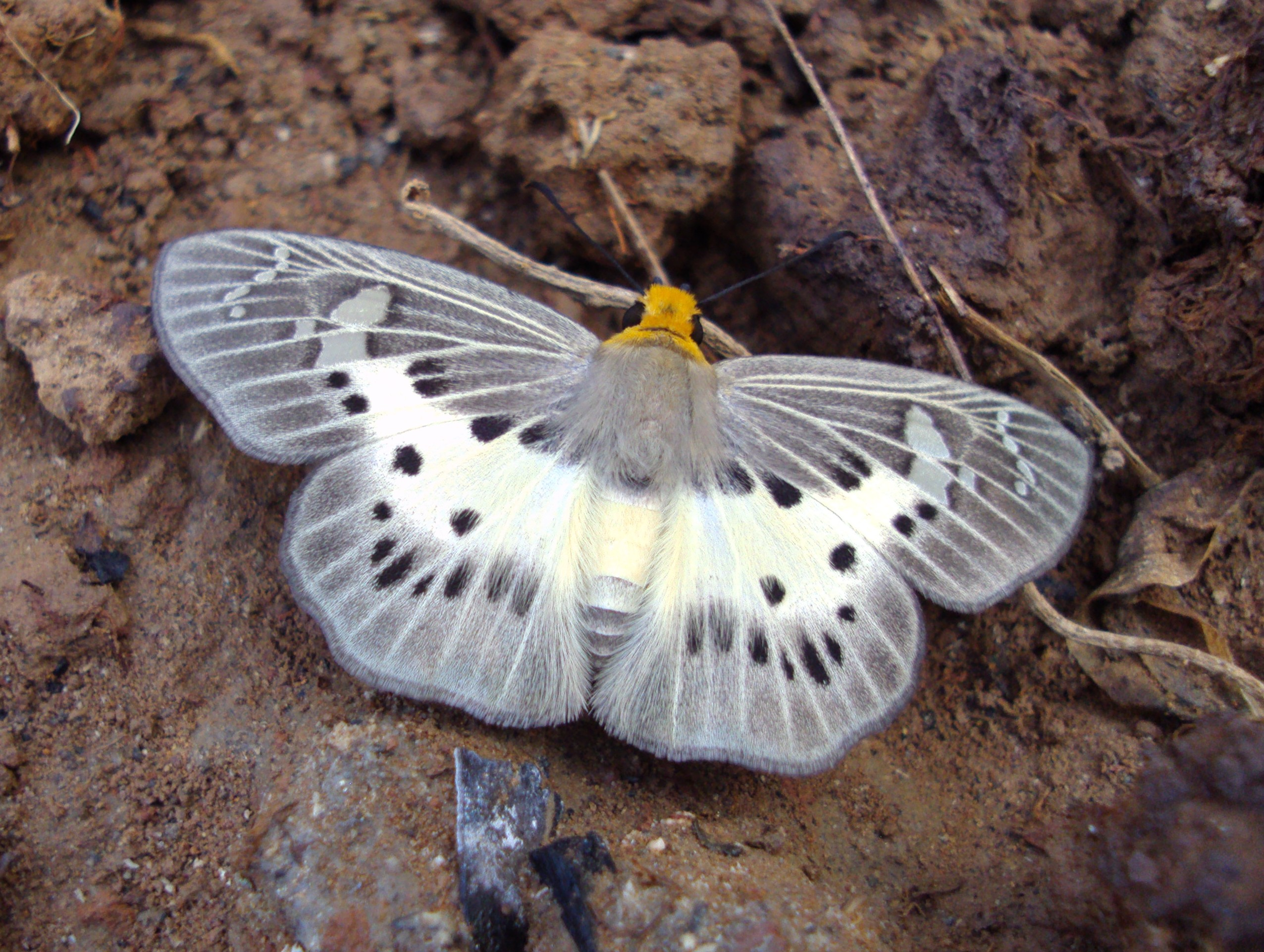

Scientific classification
- Kingdom: Animalia
- Phylum: Arthropoda
- Clade: Pancrustacea
- Class: Insecta
- Order: Lepidoptera
- Family: Hesperiidae
- Genus: Gerosis
- Species: G. bhagava

Binomial name
- Gerosis bhagava (Moore, 1865)

Synonyms
- Daimio bhagava (Moore, 1865); Satarupa bhagava Moore, 1865

= Gerosis bhagava =

Common yellowbreasted flat

Species of butterfly

Gerosis bhagava, also known as the common yellow-breast flat, is a species of butterfly in the family Hesperiidae.

== Distribution ==
It is found in India, Nepal, Bhutan, Bangladesh, Cambodia and Myanmar.

== Description ==
In 1865, Frederic Moore described this butterfly as:

Upperside dark olive-brown : fore wing with a triangular series of three discal semitransparent white spots, the first being large and within the extremity of the cell, the second quadrate and beneath the first, the third exterior to their junction; beneath these are small black spots bordering a brownish-white streak from middle of posterior margin; a recurved series of small similar white spots before the apex : hindwing with a broad brownish-white sub-basal transverse band, bordered by a semicircular series of black spots, those exteriorly assuming the form of streaks between the veins. Abdomen with a white band Underside as above. Palpi and thorax in front beneath orange-yellow. Cilia brown.

— Frederic Moore

== Life history ==
The larvae feed on Dalbergia lanceolaria.

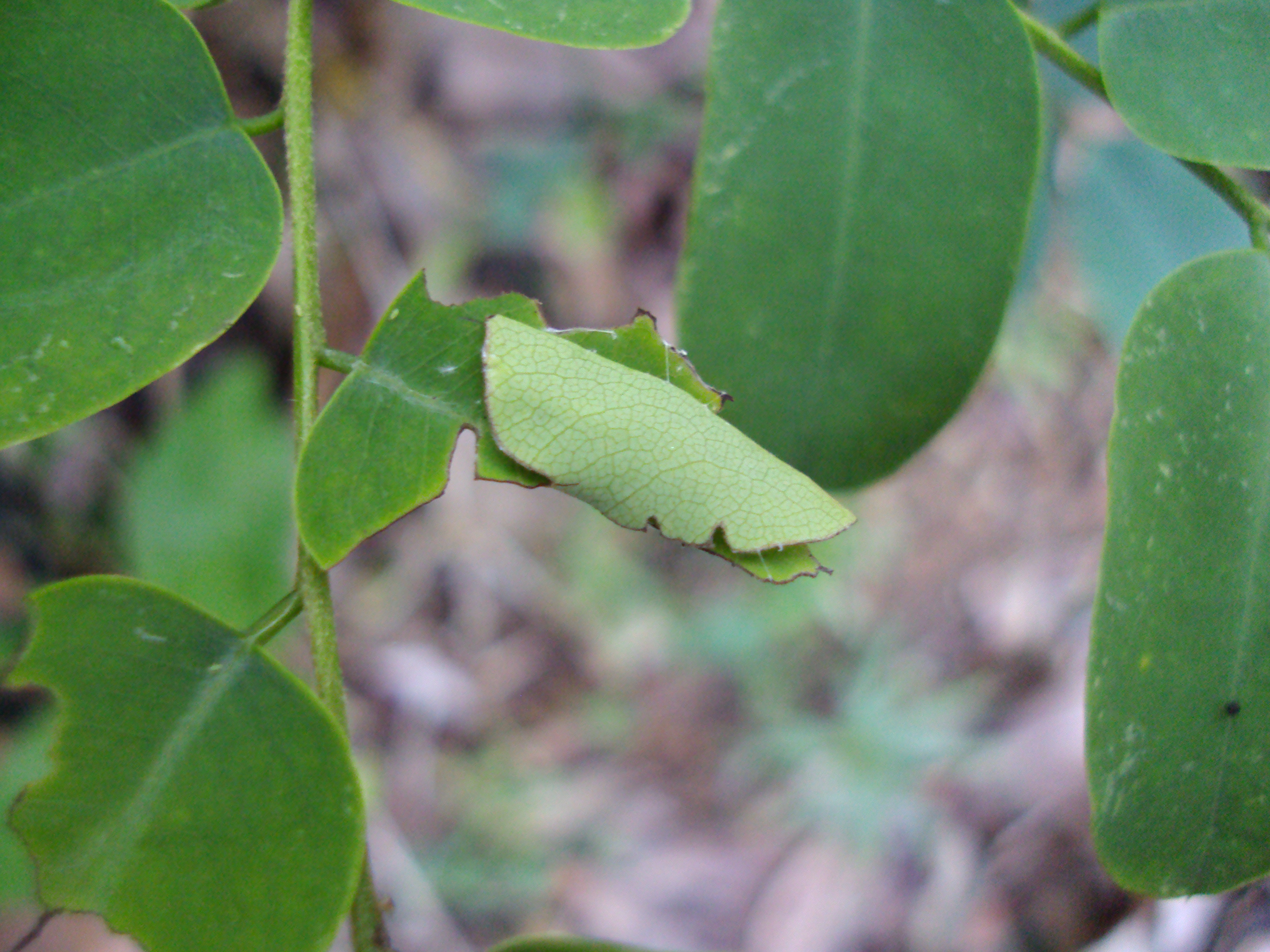
Larval cell

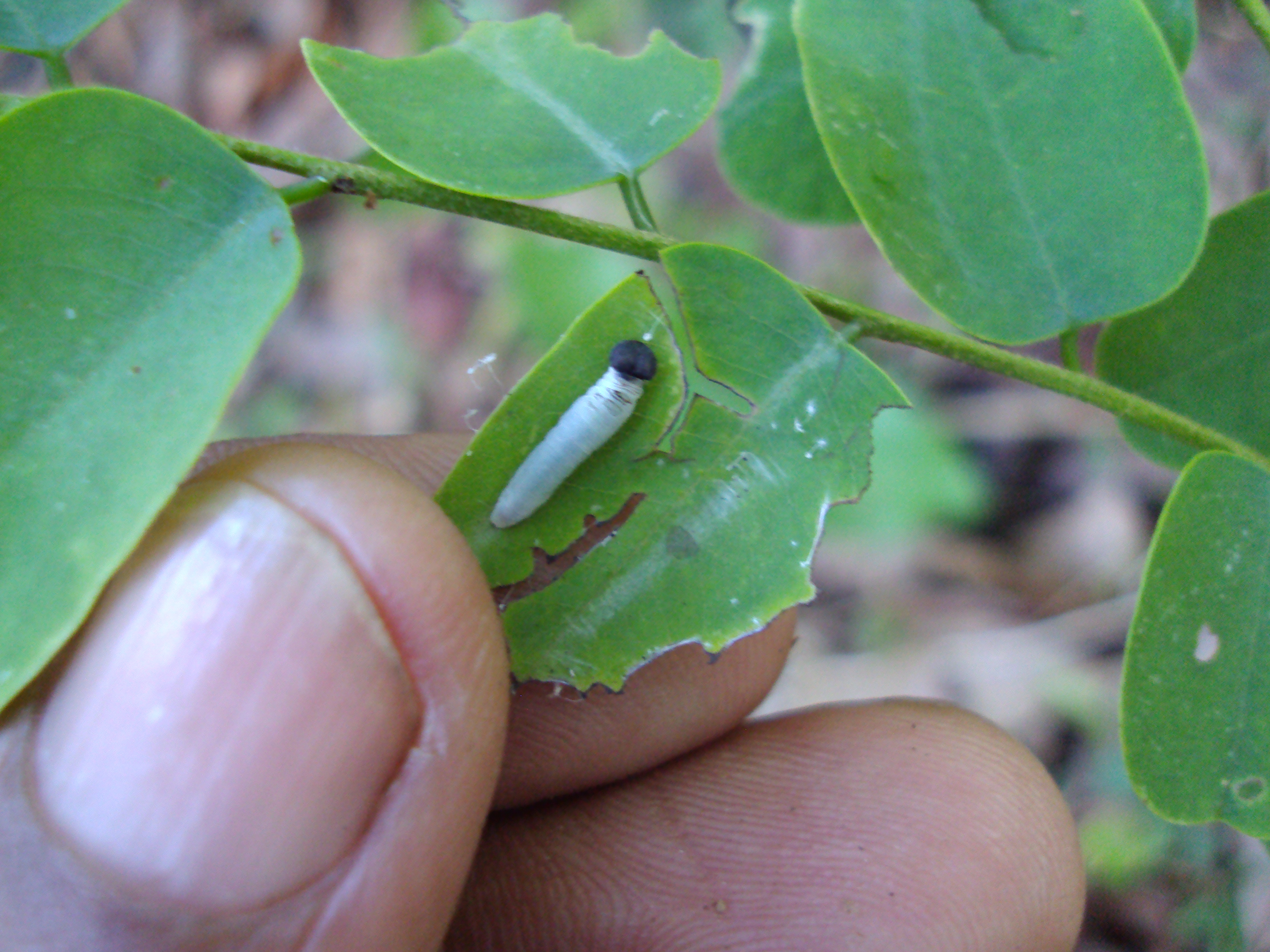
Larva

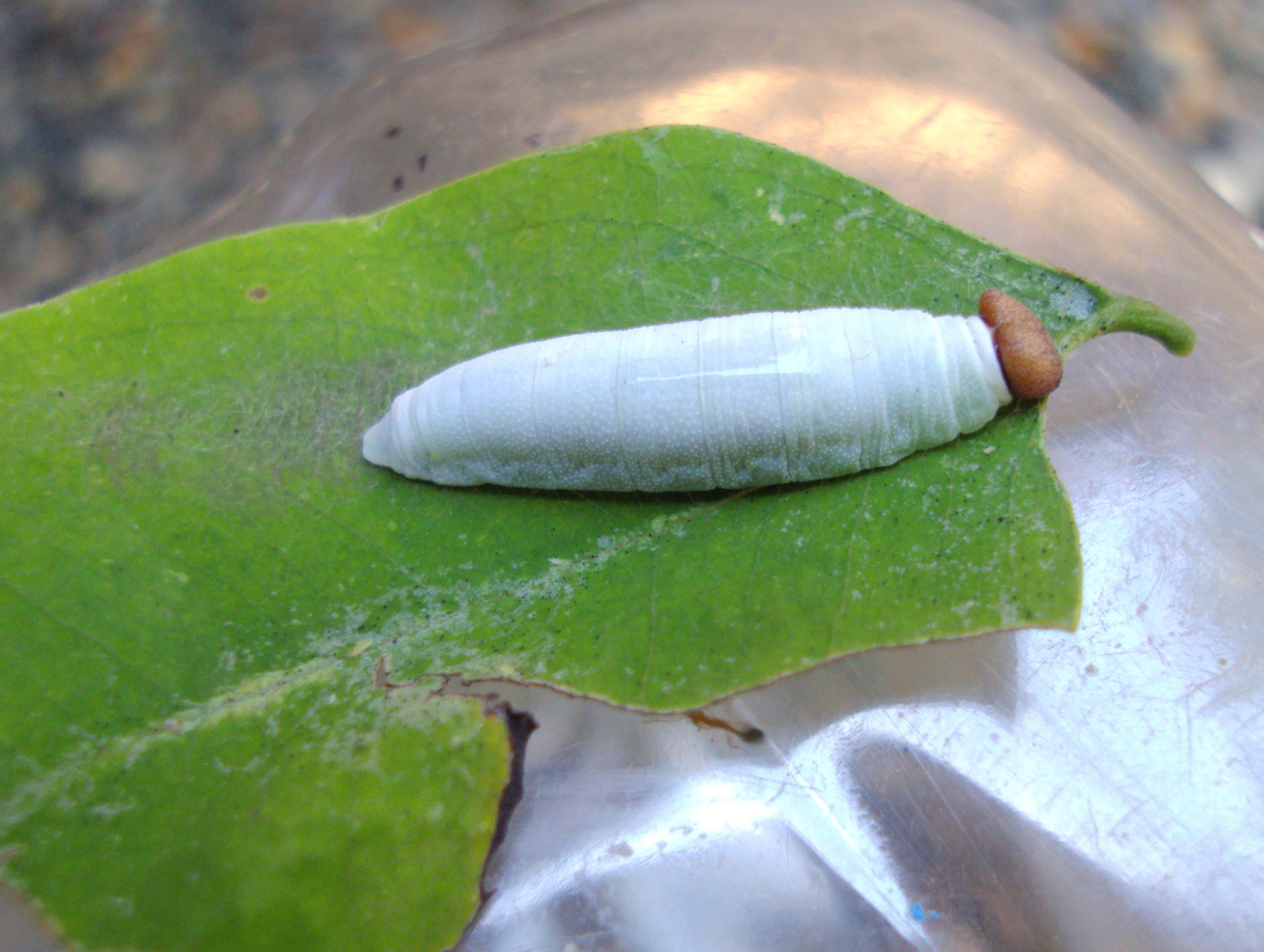
Larva

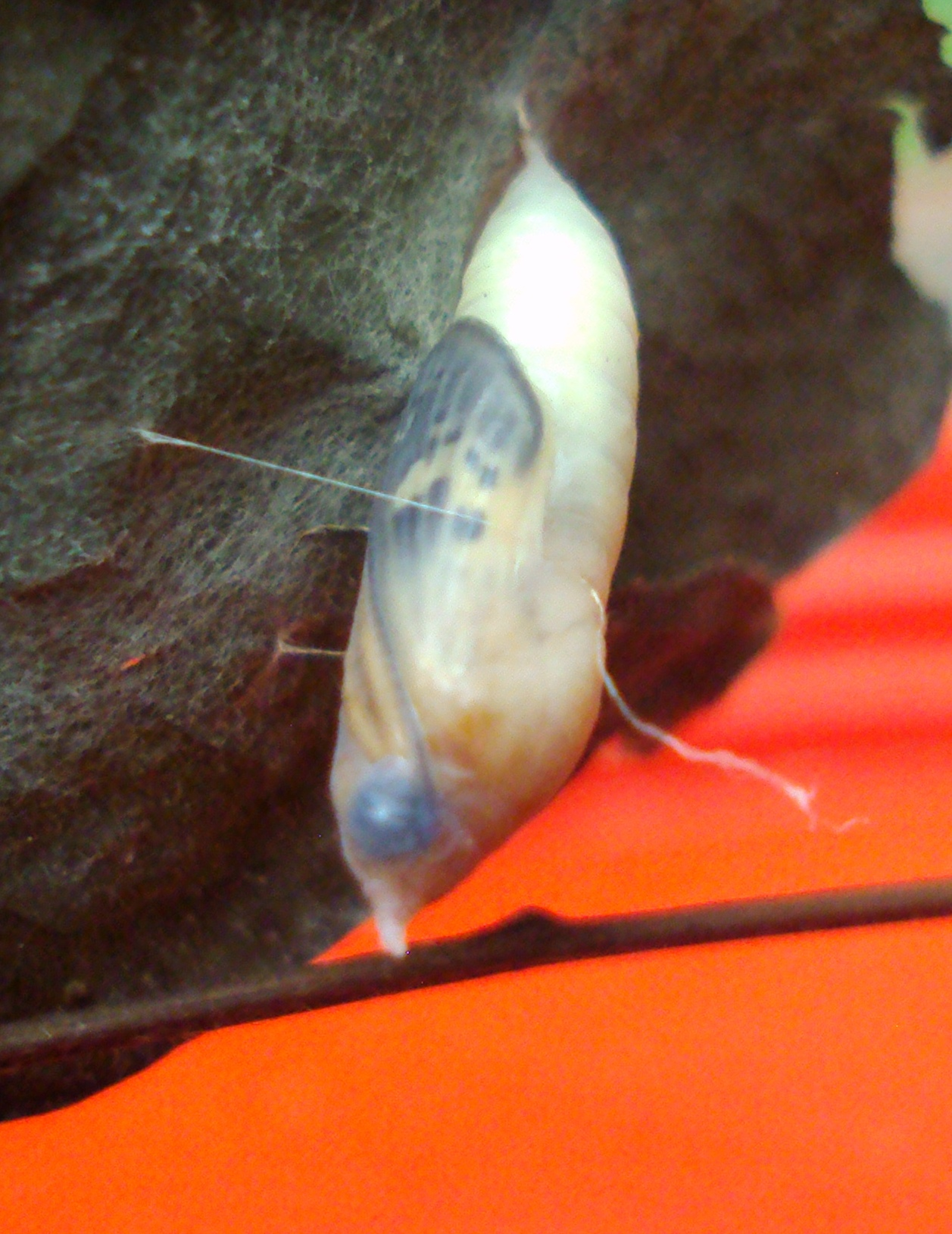
Chrysalis

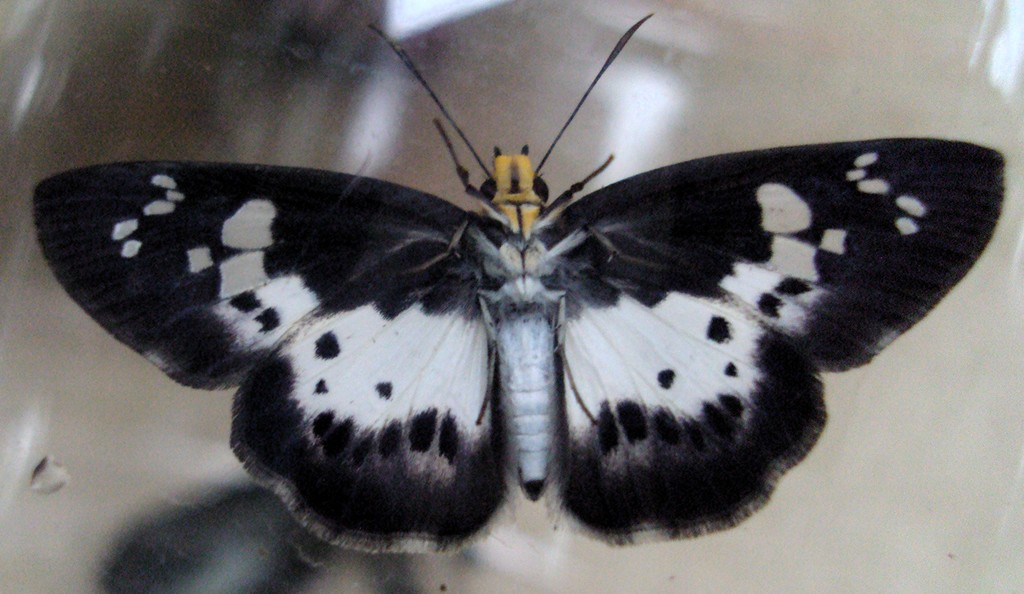
Imago (ventral view)
