= Lephana =

Scientific classification
- Kingdom: Animalia
- Phylum: Arthropoda
- Class: Insecta
- Order: Lepidoptera
- Superfamily: Noctuoidea
- Family: Erebidae
- Subfamily: Anobinae
- Genus: Lephana; Walker, 1866

Genus of moths

Lephana is a genus of moths of the family Erebidae. The genus was previously classified in the subfamily Calpinae of the family Noctuidae.

== Species ==
- Lephana excisata Kaye, 1924
- Lephana metacrocea Hampson, 1926
- Lephana oedisema Hampson, 1926
- Lephana tetraphorella Walker, 1866 – Type species
