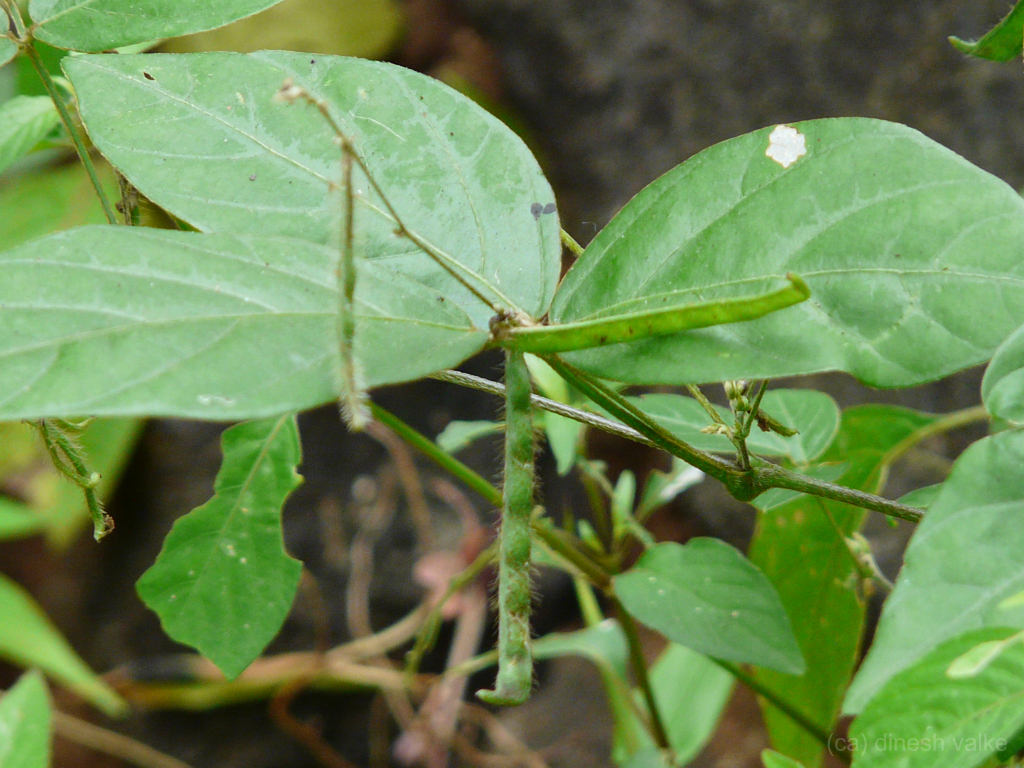
- Teramnus labialis

Scientific classification
- Kingdom: Plantae
- Clade: Tracheophytes
- Clade: Angiosperms
- Clade: Eudicots
- Clade: Rosids
- Order: Fabales
- Family: Fabaceae
- Subfamily: Faboideae
- Subtribe: Glycininae
- Genus: Teramnus; P.Browne (1756)

Species
- 8; see text

= Teramnus =

Genus of legumes

Teramnus is a genus of flowering plants in the legume family, Fabaceae. It includes eight species of climbing herbs and subshrubs native to the tropics of the Americas, sub-Saharan Africa, the Arabian Peninsula, the Indian Subcontinent, Indochina, Hainan, Taiwan, and New Guinea. Typical habitats are seasonally-dry tropical bushland and thicket, grassland, wooded grassland, and forest clearings, often in open and dry rocky areas.

It belongs to subfamily Faboideae and is closely related to Glycine as well as Amphicarpaea. The somatic chromosome number for Teramnus is (x = 7).

== Species ==
Eight species are accepted.

- Teramnus buettneri (Harms) Baker f.
- Teramnus flexilis Benth.
- Teramnus labialis (L.f.) Spreng.
- Teramnus micans (Welw. ex Baker) Baker f.
- Teramnus mollis Benth.
- Teramnus repens (Taub.) Baker f.
- Teramnus uncinatus (L.) Sw.
- Teramnus volubilis Sw.
