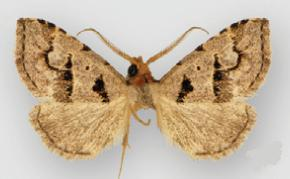

Scientific classification
- Domain: Eukaryota
- Kingdom: Animalia
- Phylum: Arthropoda
- Class: Insecta
- Order: Lepidoptera
- Superfamily: Noctuoidea
- Family: Erebidae
- Genus: Baniana
- Species: B. minor

Binomial name
- Baniana minor Lafontaine & Walsh, 2010

= Baniana minor =

Species of moth

Baniana minor is a species of moth of the family Erebidae. It occurs in open woodland/grassland scrub habitats in southeastern Arizona and also occurs, probably in similar habitats in the Guanacaste Province in Costa Rica.

The length of the forewings is 8–9 mm. Adults have been collected between mid-July and late August in Arizona. Costa Rican records are from April, May, September, November and December.
