= Marcipa accentifera =

Scientific classification
- Kingdom: Animalia
- Phylum: Arthropoda
- Clade: Pancrustacea
- Class: Insecta
- Order: Lepidoptera
- Superfamily: Noctuoidea
- Family: Erebidae
- Genus: Marcipa
- Species: M. accentifera

Binomial name
- Marcipa accentifera Pelletier, 1975

Species of moth

Marcipa accentifera is a species of moth in the family Erebidae. It is found in Africa, including the Democratic Republic of the Congo and Cameroon.
