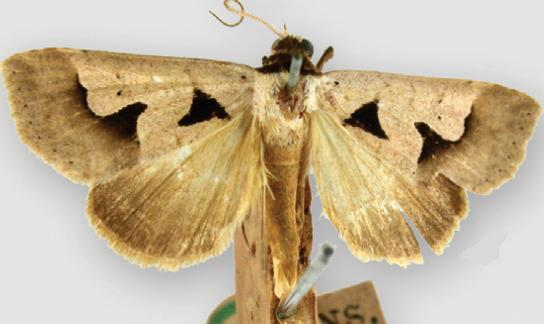

Scientific classification
- Kingdom: Animalia
- Phylum: Arthropoda
- Class: Insecta
- Order: Lepidoptera
- Superfamily: Noctuoidea
- Family: Erebidae
- Genus: Baniana
- Species: B. significans

Binomial name
- Baniana significans Walker, 1858

= Baniana significans =

Species of moth

Baniana significans is a species of moth of the family Erebidae. It is found in Cuba and Santo Domingo.
