= Deinopa angitia =

Scientific classification
- Domain: Eukaryota
- Kingdom: Animalia
- Phylum: Arthropoda
- Class: Insecta
- Order: Lepidoptera
- Superfamily: Noctuoidea
- Family: Erebidae
- Genus: Deinopa
- Species: D. angitia

Binomial name
- Deinopa angitia (H. Druce, 1891)

Species of moth

Deinopa angitia is a species of moth in the family Erebidae first described by Herbert Druce in 1891. It is found in Central and North America.

The MONA or Hodges number for Deinopa angitia is 8590.2.
