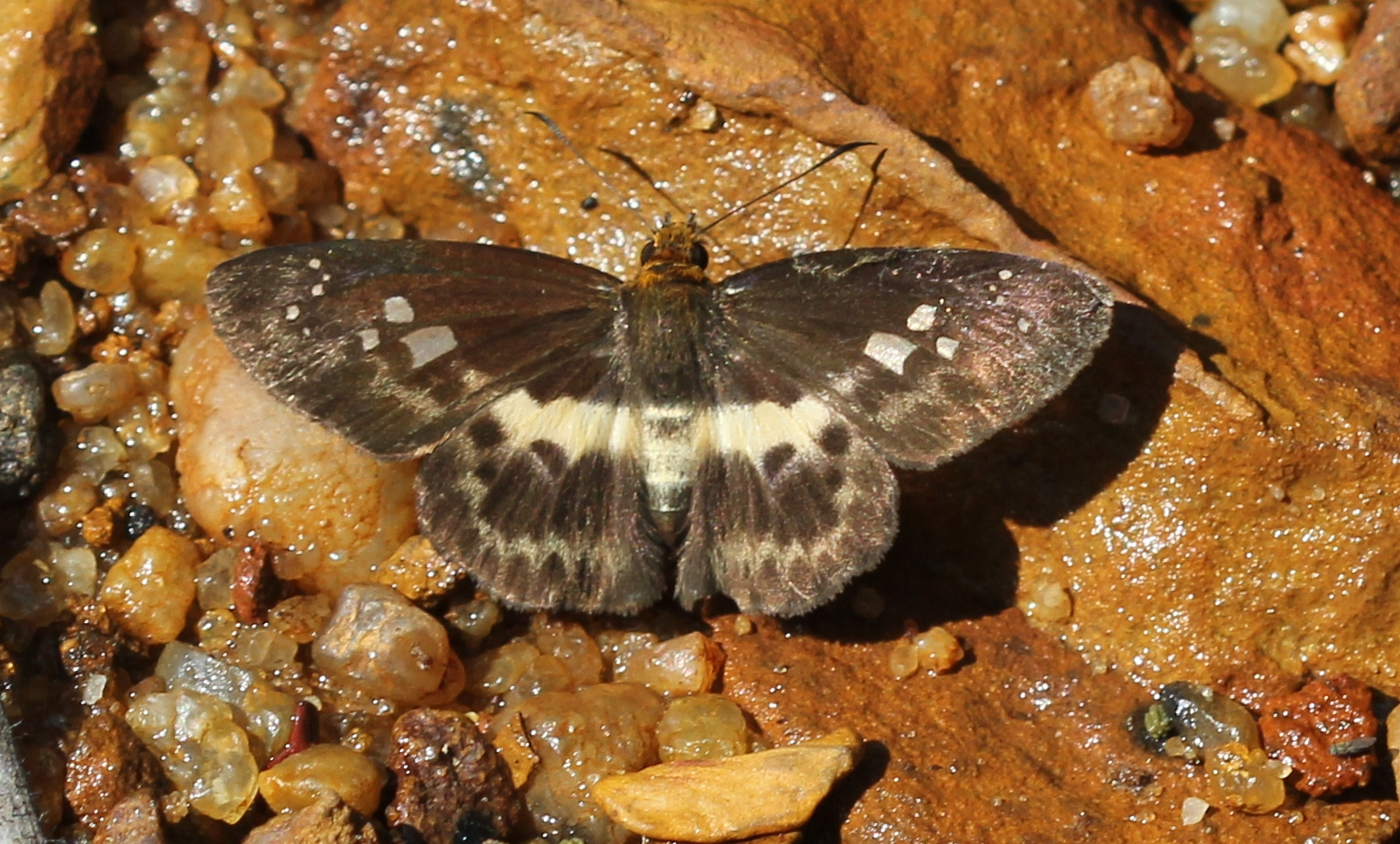

Scientific classification
- Domain: Eukaryota
- Kingdom: Animalia
- Phylum: Arthropoda
- Class: Insecta
- Order: Lepidoptera
- Family: Hesperiidae
- Genus: Gerosis
- Species: G. phisara

Binomial name
- Gerosis phisara (Moore, 1884)

Synonyms
- Daimio phisara; Satarupa phisara

= Gerosis phisara =

Dusky yellow breasted flat

Species of butterfly

Gerosis phisara, commonly known as the dusky yellow breasted flat, is a species of butterfly belonging to the family Hesperiidae.

== Distribution ==
It is found India, Nepal, Bhutan, Bangladesh and Myanmar also Burma, Thailand, Laos, Malay Peninsula, Tioman, Yunnan.

== Subspecies ==
The subspecies of Gerosis phisara found in India are-

- Gerosis phisara phisara Moore, 1884 – Khasi Dusky Yellow-breast Flat

== See also ==
- List of butterflies of India
