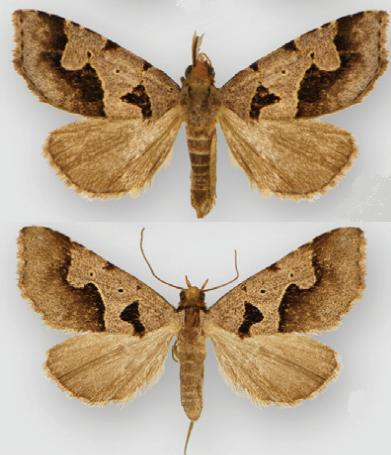
- Baniana gobar

Scientific classification
- Kingdom: Animalia
- Phylum: Arthropoda
- Class: Insecta
- Order: Lepidoptera
- Superfamily: Noctuoidea
- Family: Erebidae
- Subfamily: Anobinae
- Genus: Baniana; Walker, 1858

= Baniana =

Genus of moths

Baniana is a genus of moths of the family Erebidae. The genus was previously classified in the subfamily Calpinae of the family Noctuidae.

== Description ==
Palpi usually reaching vertex of head, where the third joint minute. Thorax and abdomen smoothly scaled. Forewings with slightly produced and falcate apex. Hindwings with vein 5 from above lower angle of cell.

== Species ==
- Baniana arvorum (Guenée 1852)
- Baniana athamas Schaus 1914
- Baniana centrata Dognin 1912
- Baniana chelesema Hampson 1926
- Baniana cohaerens Draudt 1950
- Baniana craterosema Hampson 1926
- Baniana culminifera Hampson 1910
- Baniana disticta Hampson 1926
- Baniana firmalis (Guenée, 1854)
- Baniana fulvia Druce 1898
- Baniana gobar Druce, in Godman and Salvin, 1898
- Baniana gulussa Schaus 1914
- Baniana gyas Schaus 1914
- Baniana haga Schaus, 1912
- Baniana helicon Druce 1898
- Baniana helle Schaus 1914
- Baniana herceus Schaus 1914
- Baniana inaequalis Walker, 1862 (synonym: Baniana crucilla (Schaus, 1914))
- Baniana lodebar Dyar 1916
- Baniana mademalis (Viette, 1978)
- Baniana mexicana Walker 1865
- Baniana minor Lafontaine & Walsh, 2010
- Baniana nephele Schaus 1914
- Baniana ochracea Hampson 1926
- Baniana octomaculata (Holland 1894)
- Baniana omoptila Viette 1956
- Baniana ostia Druce 1898
- Baniana pastoria Schaus 1911
- Baniana phaleniforma Dognin 1912
- Baniana phruxus Schaus 1914
- Baniana pulverulenta Hampson 1926
- Baniana punctifera Dognin 1912
- Baniana quadrimaculata (Holland 1894)
- Baniana relapsa Walker, 1858
- Baniana retrorsa Hampson 1926
- Baniana semilugens (Walker 1858)
- Baniana serpens Schaus 1914
- Baniana sexmaculata (Holland 1894)
- Baniana significans Walker, 1858
- Baniana sminthochroa Hampson 1926
- Baniana strigata Schaus 1911
- Baniana suggesta (Walker 1858)
- Baniana tincticollis (Walker 1858)
- Baniana triangulifera Dognin 1912
- Baniana trigrammos (Mabille 1881)
- Baniana veluta Schaus, 1901
- Baniana veluticollis Hampson 1898
- Baniana ypita Schaus, 1901
