= Marcipa brunnescens =

Scientific classification
- Kingdom: Animalia
- Phylum: Arthropoda
- Clade: Pancrustacea
- Class: Insecta
- Order: Lepidoptera
- Superfamily: Noctuoidea
- Family: Erebidae
- Genus: Marcipa
- Species: M. brunnescens

Binomial name
- Marcipa brunnescens Pelletier, 1978

Species of moth

Marcipa brunnescens is a species of moth in the family Erebidae.
