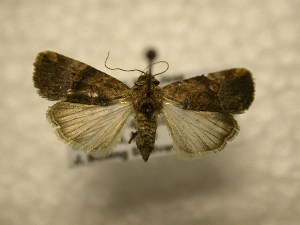

Scientific classification
- Kingdom: Animalia
- Phylum: Arthropoda
- Class: Insecta
- Order: Lepidoptera
- Superfamily: Noctuoidea
- Family: Erebidae
- Genus: Baniana
- Species: B. relapsa

Binomial name
- Baniana relapsa (Walker, 1858)

Synonyms
- Poaphila relapsa Walker, 1858; Baniana bifida Herrich-Schäffer, 1869; Baniana praeusta Herrich-Schäffer, 1868; Baniana praecesta

= Baniana relapsa =

Species of moth

Baniana relapsa is a species of moth of the family Erebidae. It is found on the Antilles.

Adults are sexually dimorphic.
