= Marcipa madegassa =

Scientific classification
- Kingdom: Animalia
- Phylum: Arthropoda
- Clade: Pancrustacea
- Class: Insecta
- Order: Lepidoptera
- Superfamily: Noctuoidea
- Family: Erebidae
- Genus: Marcipa
- Species: M. madegassa

Binomial name
- Marcipa madegassa Viette, 1958

Species of moth

Marcipa madegassa is a species of moth in the family Erebidae. It is found in Madagascar.
