= Marcipa endoselene =

Scientific classification
- Kingdom: Animalia
- Phylum: Arthropoda
- Clade: Pancrustacea
- Class: Insecta
- Order: Lepidoptera
- Superfamily: Noctuoidea
- Family: Erebidae
- Genus: Marcipa
- Species: M. endoselene

Binomial name
- Marcipa endoselene Hampson, 1926

Species of moth

Marcipa endoselene is a species of moth in the family Erebidae. It is found in Africa, including Cameroon and Ghana.
