= Teramnus labialis =

Scientific classification
- Kingdom: Plantae
- Clade: Tracheophytes
- Clade: Angiosperms
- Clade: Eudicots
- Clade: Rosids
- Order: Fabales
- Family: Fabaceae
- Subfamily: Faboideae
- Genus: Teramnus
- Species: T. labialis

Binomial name
- Teramnus labialis (L.f.) Spreng.

Synonyms
- Glycine labialis L.f.

Species of plant

Teramnus labialis is a species of plant in the family Fabaceae which is native to much of tropical Central America, Africa, South/Southeast Asia, and New Guinea and has also been introduced elsewhere in South America and Oceania. It has documented use in Indian Ayurveda and its seeds are eaten boiled and roasted.
