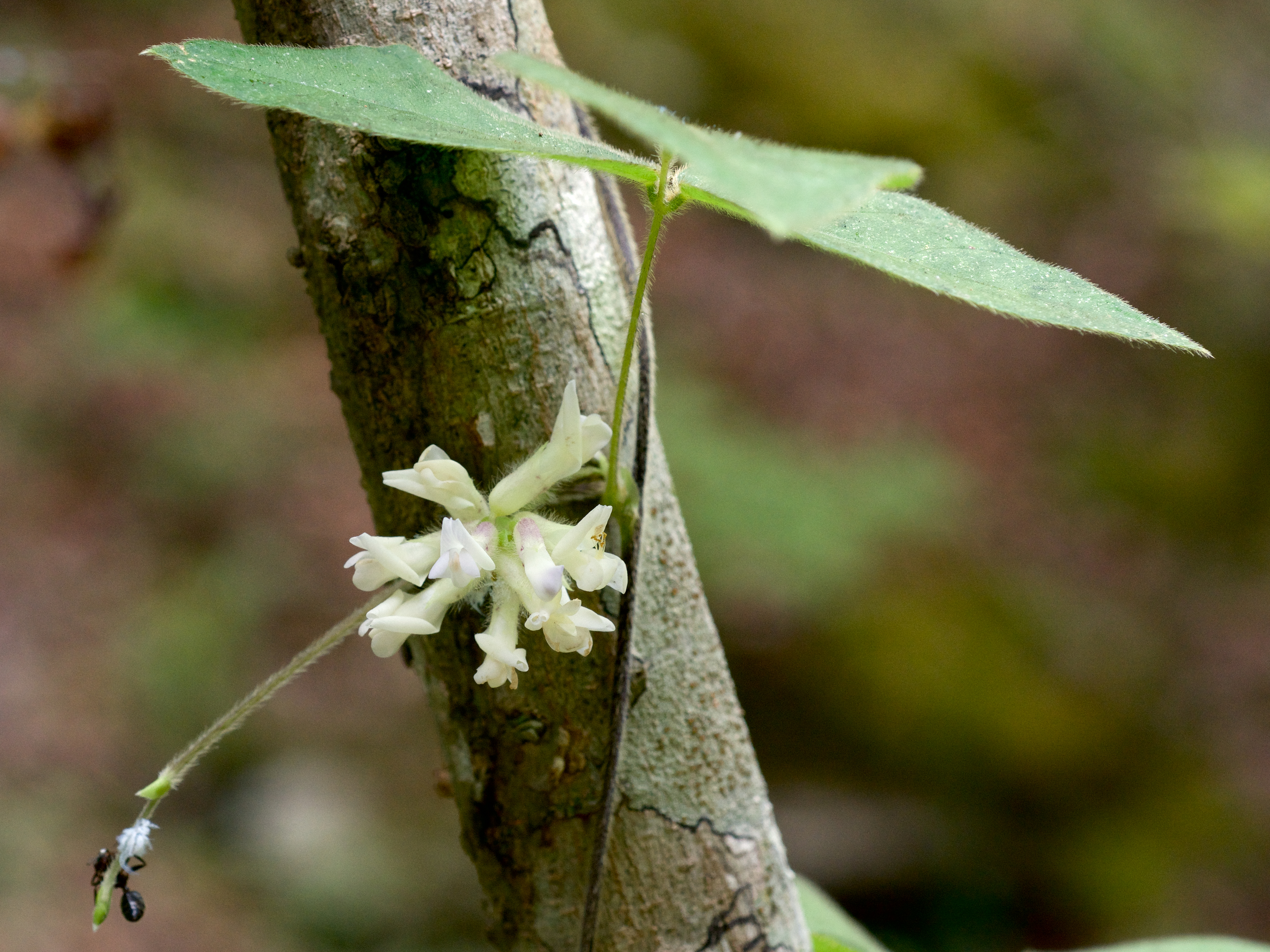
- Inflorescence

Scientific classification
- Kingdom: Plantae
- Clade: Embryophytes
- Clade: Tracheophytes
- Clade: Angiosperms
- Clade: Eudicots
- Clade: Rosids
- Order: Fabales
- Family: Fabaceae
- Subfamily: Faboideae
- Genus: Amphicarpaea
- Species: A. bracteata

Binomial name
- Amphicarpaea bracteata (L.) Fernald

Synonyms
- l: Falcata comosa (L.) Kuntze; Glycine bracteata L. (basionym)

= Amphicarpaea bracteata =

Hog-peanut

Species of legume

Amphicarpaea bracteata (American hog peanut or hog-peanut or ground bean) is an annual to perennial vine in the legume family, native to woodland, thickets, and moist slopes in eastern North America. A. bracteata can be found in eastern North America, as well as further west into the Midwestern region, including Iowa, Indiana, Illinois, and Wisconsin.

== Amphicarpaea genus ==
The Amphicarpaea genus contains three species including A. africana, A. edgeworthii, and A. bracteata. Amphicarpic species, which include Amphicarpaea, can produce aerial and subterranean fruits and flowers.

== Varieties of A. bracteata ==
A. bracteata consists of two varieties, var. bracteata and var. comosa, with the former being common in eastern North America and the latter more common in the central and mid-western regions of North America. Var. bracteata develops slender leaves and stems and sparse pubescence, while var. comosa develops thicker leaves and stems with coarse and dense pubescence.

== Biology ==
A. brachteata are diploid organisms with 20 chromosomes in their somatic cells. This species produces aerial chasmogamous and cleistogamous flowers, as well as subterranean cleistogamous flowers depending on environmental conditions and the availability of certain resources. Cleistogamous flowers have reduced reproductive parts and self-fertilize. Chasmogamous flowers are adapted to cross-fertilize, or outcross.

=== Leaf and floral biology ===
Leaves have three leaflets and are held alternately on twining stems.

Flowers are pink to white, pendulate or bell-shaped, and bloom from late summer to autumn. The flowers are either open for cross-pollination or closed and self-pollinating. The closed flowers may be above or below ground.

Seeds from open flowers are held in a flat pod, pointed at both ends, that dries when mature and twists to release the seeds. Seeds from closed flowers are held in round pods with a single seed each. The roots and the cooked seeds from under the ground are edible. The seeds which become subterranean from flowers on stolons give it the name hog peanut.

Aerial cleistogamous flowers usually develop as single flowers or in a pair located at the basal section of the plant. They have one ovary, with one to three ovules, and ten anthers. Subterranean cleistogamous flowers form on underground stolons or cotyledons formed by the plant. These flowers can only develop in dark and moist conditions. They contain one ovary, with one to two ovules, and two fertile anthers.

Aerial chasmogamous flowers are located on the distal nodes of the plant, containing one ovary, with three ovules, and ten diadelphous stamens that are joined by their filaments.

=== Fruits ===
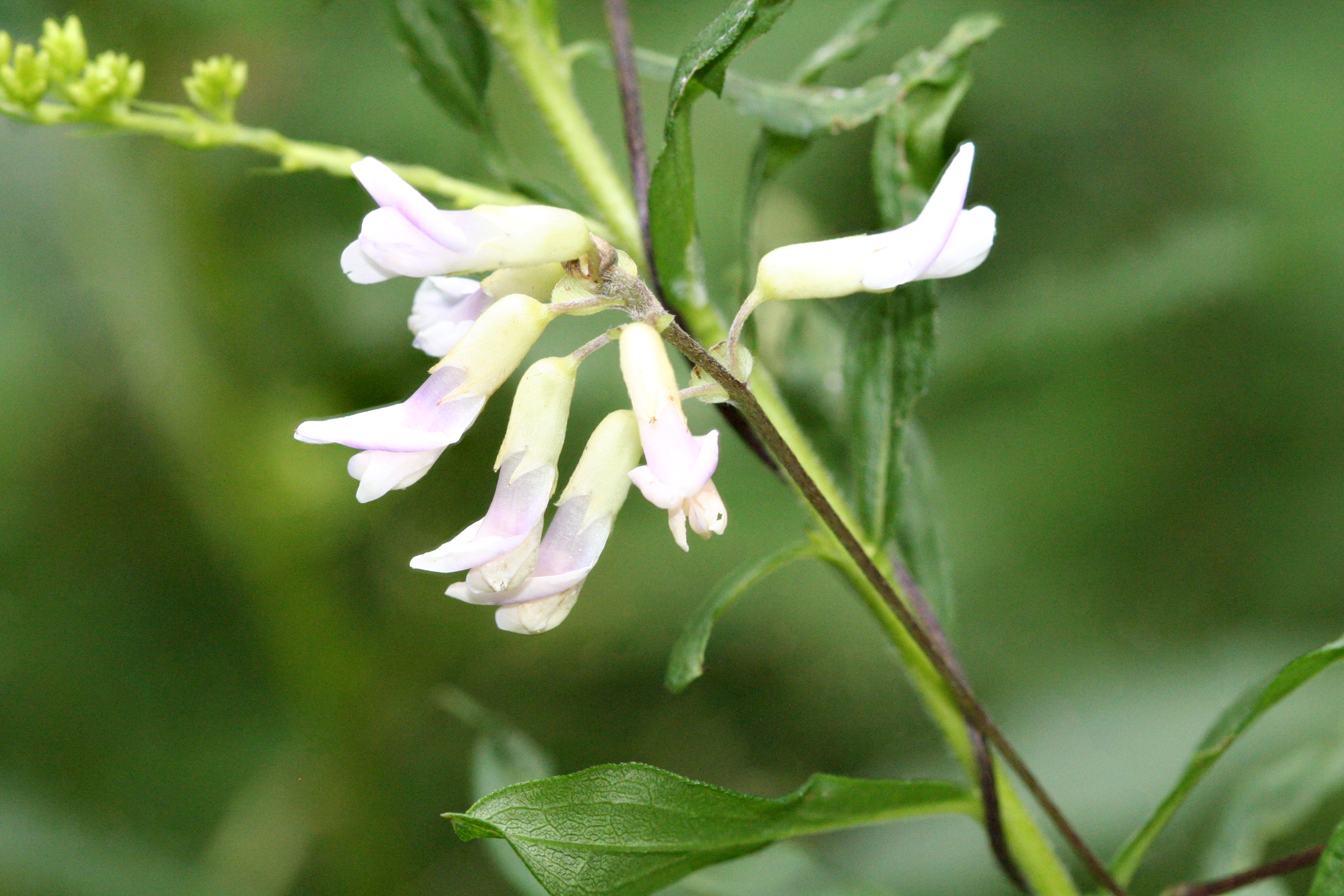
Hog-peanut flowers

The genus name Amphicarpaea derives from the word "amphicarpy", which refers to a plant's ability to produce both aerial and subterranean flowers. Similar to other species of legumes, both aerial cleistogamous and chasmogamous flowers produce dry fruits with a hard casing. Cleistogamous flowers produce fruits containing one to three seeds, and chasmogamous flowers produce flowers containing one to four seeds. Subterranean cleistogamous flowers develop into immature fruits that usually contain a large, fleshy seed with a thin seed casing, or pericarp.

== Growth ==
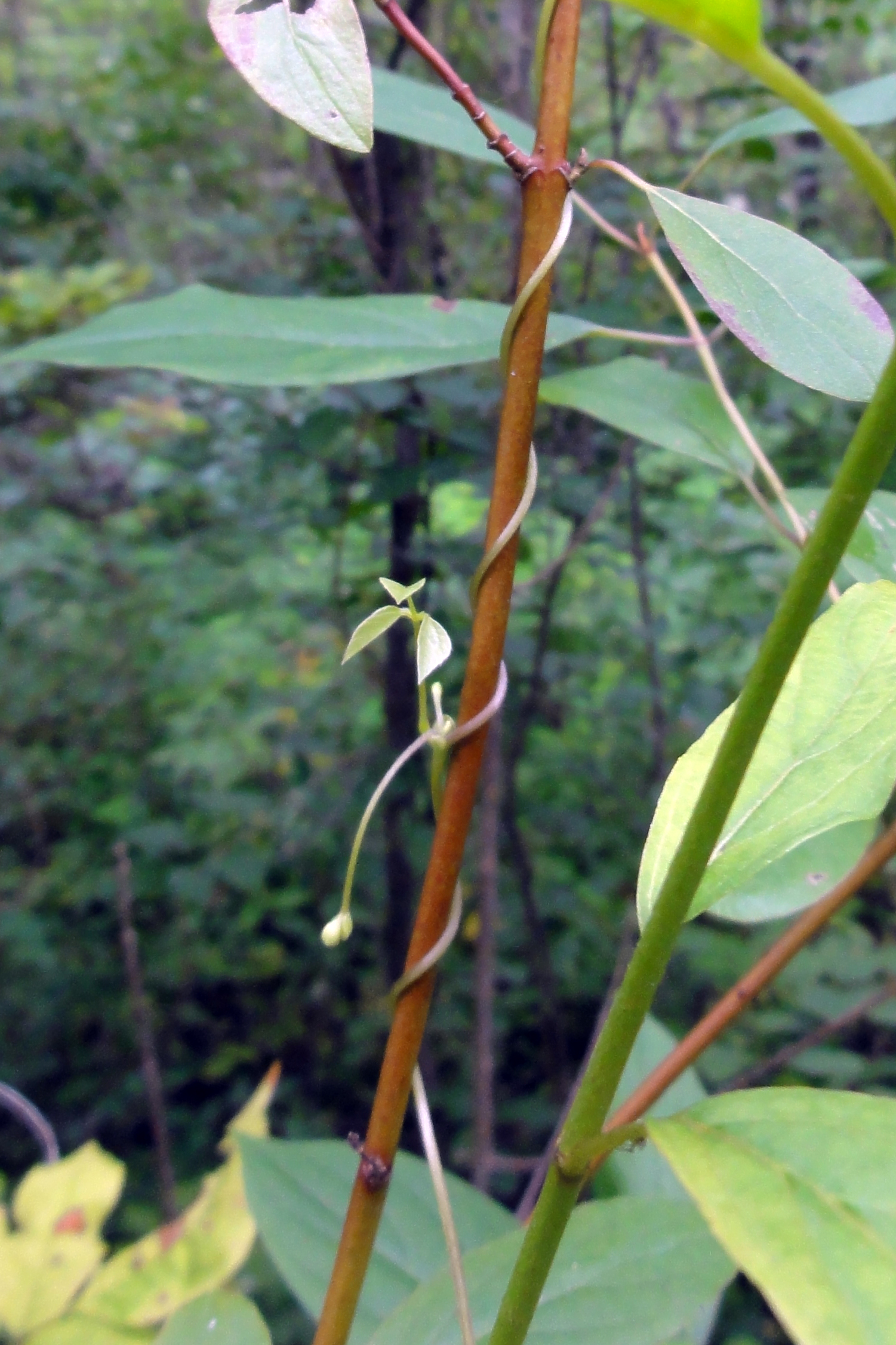
Twining vines

The hog-peanut is a twining annual vine that grows by wrapping itself around neighboring structures. The vines produce aerial and subterranean seed pods. Individuals from aerial seeds tend to produce smaller seeds and mature plants, while individuals from subterranean seeds produce larger seeds with plants growing larger and more rapidly than those from aerial seeds. This dimorphism might be attributed to the trade-offs and constraints that developed from having diverse reproductive strategies. A. bracteata grows best in shaded and moist conditions, but can also be successful in unshaded habitats.

== Uses ==
=== Biological studies ===
A. bracteata has been used in botanical studies due to its reproductive plasticity and ability to produce diverse plant structures, such as flowers and seeds with varying reproductive functions and traits depending on its resources and environmental conditions. Some of the diverse structures studied include cleistogamous and chasmogamous flowers, and aerial and subterranean seeds and flowers.

=== Agricultural and medicinal uses ===
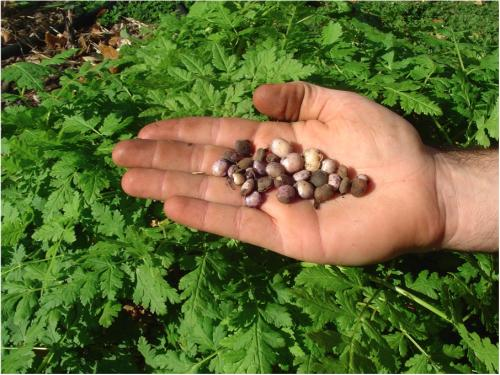
Subterranean fruits

The name 'hog-peanut" comes from the grazing of plants and consumption of the subterranean seeds by hogs and other livestock.

Amphicarpaea was used by indigenous groups, like the Cherokee and Iroquois people, as an antidiarrheal, gastric medication, and cathartic, as well as a treatment for snake bites and tuberculosis.

=== Nitrogen-fixation ===
Like other members of the Fabaceae family, Amphicarpaea house nitrogen-fixing bacteria which can fix atmospheric nitrogen that enters the soil. Nitrogen-fixation is a vital process for agriculture and can act as a natural fertilizer that promotes the production of vital proteins in plants, contributing to their growth.
