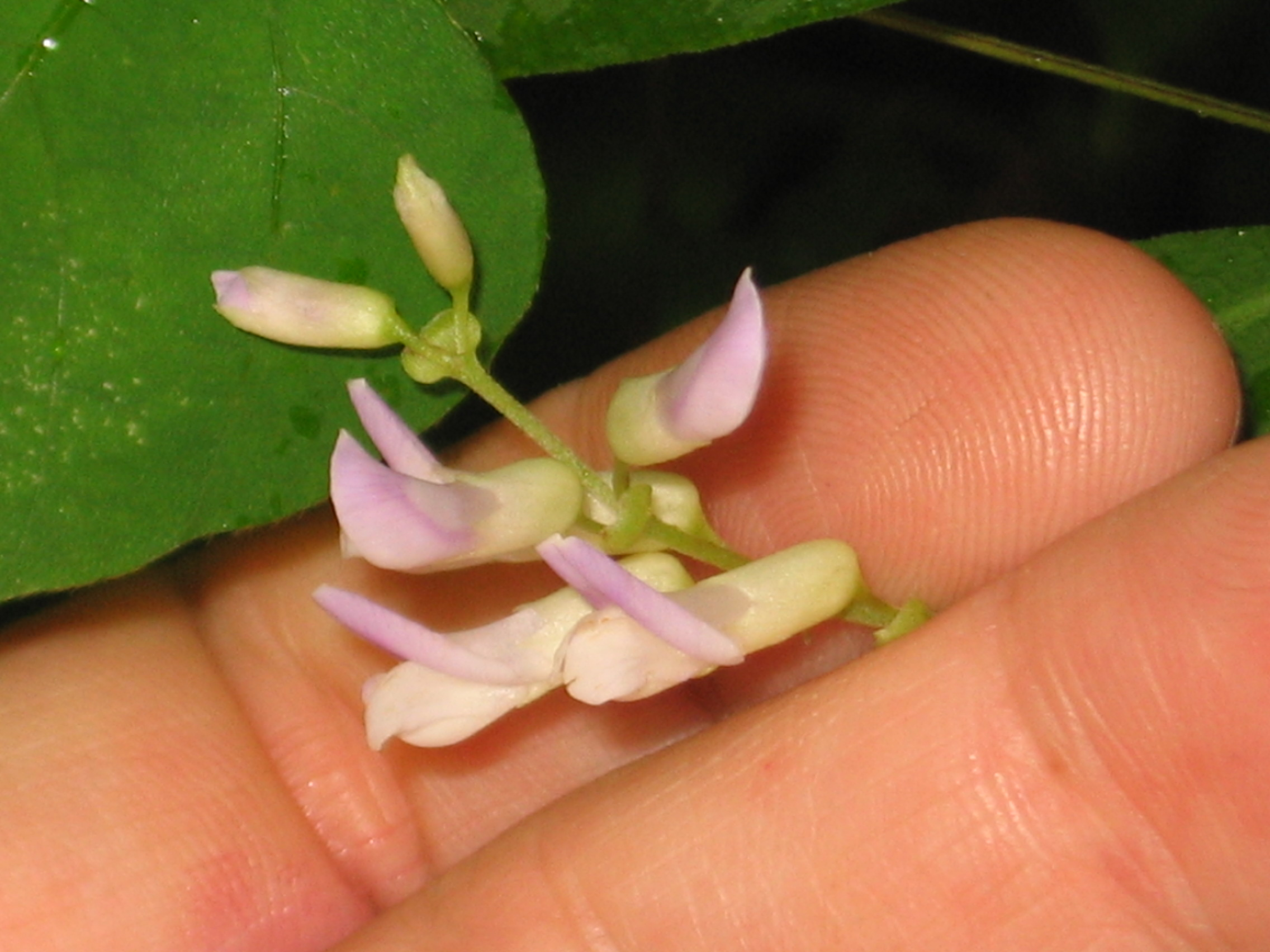
- Amphicarpaea bracteata

Scientific classification
- Kingdom: Plantae
- Clade: Tracheophytes
- Clade: Angiosperms
- Clade: Eudicots
- Clade: Rosids
- Order: Fabales
- Family: Fabaceae
- Subfamily: Faboideae
- Clade: Millettioids
- Tribe: Phaseoleae
- Subtribe: Glycininae
- Genus: Amphicarpaea; Elliott ex Nutt. (1818), nom. cons.

Species
- Amphicarpaea bracteata (L.) Fernald; Amphicarpaea edgeworthii Benth.; Amphicarpaea ferruginea Benth.

Synonyms
- Cryptolobus Spreng. (1818); Falcata J.F.Gmel. (1792); Lobomon Raf. (1836); Savia Raf. (1808), nom. illeg.; Tetrodea Raf. (1836), nom. superfl.

= Amphicarpaea =

Genus of legumes

Amphicarpaea, commonly known as hogpeanut, is a genus of flowering plants in the legume family, Fabaceae. It includes three species native to eastern North America and southern, southeastern, and eastern Asia. It belongs to the subfamily Faboideae.

Species include:

- Amphicarpaea bracteata (L.) Fernald – eastern North America
- Amphicarpaea edgeworthii Benth. – eastern and southeast Asia (China, India, Japan, Korea, Russia, Vietnam)
- Amphicarpaea ferruginea Benth. – Nepal to eastern Himalalayas, Myanmar, south-central China (Sichuan and Yunnan), and Thailand

It is classified in subtribe Glycininae and its closest relatives are Glycine and Teramnus:

- Amphicarpaea
- - Glycine
  - Teramnus
