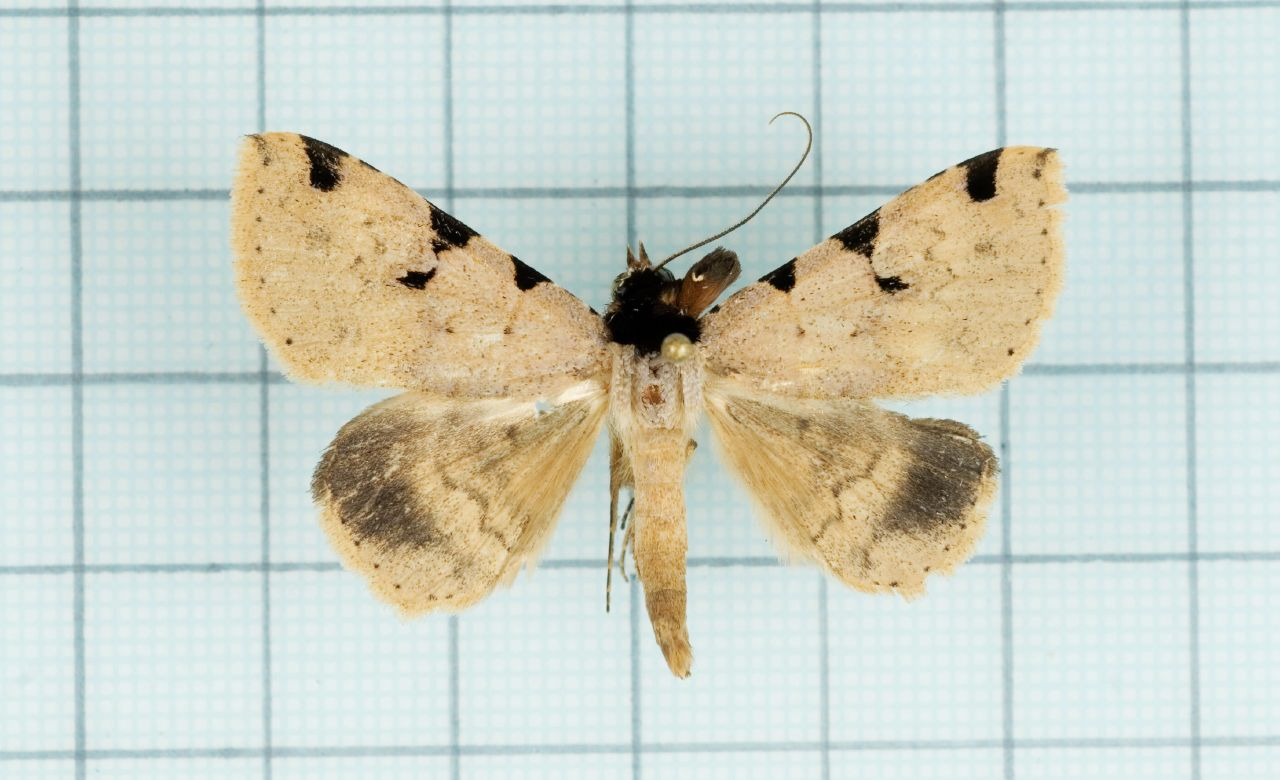
- Rema costimacula

Scientific classification
- Kingdom: Animalia
- Phylum: Arthropoda
- Clade: Pancrustacea
- Class: Insecta
- Order: Lepidoptera
- Superfamily: Noctuoidea
- Family: Erebidae
- Subfamily: Calpinae
- Genus: Rema; C. Swinhoe, 1900

Synonyms
- Trigonodesma Wileman & South, 1921

= Rema (moth) =

Genus of moths

Rema is a genus of moths of the family Erebidae. The genus was erected by Charles Swinhoe in 1900.

== Species ==
- Rema bimacula Wileman & South, 1921
- Rema costimacula (Guenée, 1852)
- Rema tetraspila (Walker, 1865)
