= Leptoceryx =

Scientific classification
- Domain: Eukaryota
- Kingdom: Animalia
- Phylum: Arthropoda
- Class: Insecta
- Order: Lepidoptera
- Superfamily: Noctuoidea
- Family: Erebidae
- Subfamily: Arctiinae
- Genus: Leptoceryx; Kiriakoff, 1953

Synonyms
- Miracidion Kiriakoff, 1953

Genus of moths

Leptoceryx is a genus of moths in the subfamily Arctiinae.

== Species ==
- Leptoceryx caudatula Kiriakoff, 1953
- Leptoceryx pusilla Kiriakoff, 1953
