= List of moths of Angola =

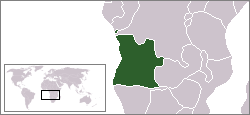
Location of Angola

There are about 800 types of moths of Angola. The moths (mostly nocturnal) and butterflies (mostly diurnal) together make up the taxonomic order Lepidoptera.

This is a list of moth species which have been recorded in Angola.

== Anomoeotidae ==
- Anomoeotes infuscata Talbot, 1929
- Anomoeotes leucolena Holland, 1893
- Anomoeotes phaeomera Hampson, 1920
- Staphylinochrous albabasis Bethune-Baker, 1911
- Thermochrous marginata Talbot, 1929

== Arctiidae ==
- Acantharctia nivea Aurivillius, 1900
- Afrasura crenulata (Bethune-Baker, 1911)
- Afrasura hieroglyphica (Bethune-Baker, 1911)
- Afrasura indecisa (Walker, 1869)
- Afrasura obliterata (Walker, 1864)
- Afrospilarctia flavida (Bartel, 1903)
- Afrospilarctia lucida (Druce, 1898)
- Alpenus investigatorum (Karsch, 1898)
- Alpenus maculosa (Stoll, 1781)
- Alpenus nigropunctata (Bethune-Baker, 1908)
- Amata alicia (Butler, 1876)
- Amata pembertoni Rothschild, 1910
- Amata tripunctata (Bethune-Baker, 1911)
- Amerila brunnea (Hampson, 1901)
- Amerila bubo (Walker, 1855)
- Amerila luteibarba (Hampson, 1901)
- Amerila niveivitrea (Bartel, 1903)
- Amerila rufifemur (Walker, 1855)
- Amerila vitrea Plötz, 1880
- Amsacta aureolimbata Rothschild, 1910
- Anaphosia parallela Bethune-Baker, 1911
- Anapisa histrio (Kiriakoff, 1953)
- Argina astrea (Drury, 1773)
- Asura pectinella Strand, 1922
- Balacra batesi Druce, 1910
- Balacra caeruleifascia Walker, 1856
- Balacra compsa (Jordan, 1904)
- Balacra daphaena (Hampson, 1898)
- Balacra flavimacula Walker, 1856
- Balacra nigripennis (Aurivillius, 1904)
- Balacra pulchra Aurivillius, 1892
- Balacra rubricincta Holland, 1893
- Binna penicillata Walker, 1865
- Ceryx flava Bethune-Baker, 1911
- Creatonotos leucanioides Holland, 1893
- Dionychoscelis venata Aurivillius, 1922
- Dubatolovia neurophaea (Hampson, 1911)
- Eilema minutissima Bethune-Baker, 1911
- Eilema triplaiola (Bethune-Baker, 1911)
- Estigmene flaviceps Hampson, 1907
- Estigmene internigralis Hampson, 1905
- Estigmene neuriastis Hampson, 1907
- Estigmene tenuistrigata (Hampson, 1900)
- Estigmene trivitta (Walker, 1855)
- Euchromia lethe (Fabricius, 1775)
- Eyralpenus diplosticta (Hampson, 1900)
- Eyralpenus inconspicua (Rothschild, 1910)
- Eyralpenus metaxantha (Hampson, 1920)
- Eyralpenus scioana (Oberthür, 1880)
- Galtara nepheloptera (Hampson, 1910)
- Ischnarctia brunnescens Bartel, 1903
- Ischnarctia oberthueri (Rothschild, 1910)
- Meganaclia perpusilla (Walker, 1856)
- Metarctia diversa Bethune-Baker, 1911
- Metarctia flavicincta Aurivillius, 1900
- Metarctia flavivena Hampson, 1901
- Metarctia heinrichi Kiriakoff, 1961
- Metarctia inconspicua Holland, 1892
- Metarctia jordani Kiriakoff, 1957
- Metarctia lateritia Herrich-Schäffer, 1855
- Metarctia pallens Bethune-Baker, 1911
- Metarctia paremphares Holland, 1893
- Metarctia rubribasa Bethune-Baker, 1911
- Metarctia salmonea Kiriakoff, 1957
- Metarctia unicolor (Oberthür, 1880)
- Metarctia uniformis Bethune-Baker, 1911
- Micralarctia punctulatum (Wallengren, 1860)
- Nacliodes microsippia Strand, 1912
- Nanna diplisticta (Bethune-Baker, 1911)
- Nanna melanosticta (Bethune-Baker, 1911)
- Nyctemera apicalis (Walker, 1854)
- Nyctemera itokina (Aurivillius, 1904)
- Nyctemera rattrayi (Swinhoe, 1904)
- Onychipodia flavithorax Rothschild, 1912
- Ovenna simulans (Mabille, 1878)
- Ovenna vicaria (Walker, 1854)
- Paralacydes arborifera (Butler, 1875)
- Paramaenas nephelistis (Hampson, 1907)
- Paramelisa lophuroides Oberthür, 1911
- Popoudina griseipennis (Bartel, 1903)
- Pseudlepista holoxantha Hampson, 1918
- Pseudothyretes carnea (Hampson, 1898)
- Pseudothyretes perpusilla (Walker, 1856)
- Pseudothyretes rubicundula (Strand, 1912)
- Pusiola celida (Bethune-Baker, 1911)
- Pusiola curta (Rothschild, 1912)
- Rhabdomarctia rubrilineata (Bethune-Baker, 1911)
- Rhipidarctia invaria (Walker, 1856)
- Rhipidarctia pareclecta (Holland, 1893)
- Rhipidarctia rubrovitta (Aurivillius, 1904)
- Saenura flava Wallengren, 1860
- Secusio ansorgei Rothschild, 1933
- Secusio deilemera Talbot, 1929
- Secusio discoidalis Talbot, 1929
- Secusio drucei Rothschild, 1933
- Secusio monteironis Rothschild, 1933
- Siccia atriguttata Hampson, 1909
- Spilosoma angolensis Bartel, 1903
- Spilosoma bipartita Rothschild, 1933
- Spilosoma chionea (Hampson, 1900)
- Spilosoma heterogenea Bartel, 1903
- Spilosoma lineata Walker, 1855
- Spilosoma semihyalina Bartel, 1903
- Spilosoma unipuncta (Hampson, 1905)
- Stenarctia abdominalis Rothschild, 1910
- Stenarctia quadripunctata Aurivillius, 1900
- Teracotona euprepia Hampson, 1900
- Teracotona euprepioides Wichgraf, 1921
- Teracotona homeyeri Rothschild, 1910
- Teracotona immaculata (Wichgraf, 1921)
- Teracotona pardalina Bartel, 1903
- Teracotona trifasciata Bartel, 1903
- Thyretes monteiroi Butler, 1876
- Utetheisa pulchella (Linnaeus, 1758)

== Autostichidae ==
- Pachnistis morologa Meyrick, 1923

== Bombycidae ==
- Racinoa obliquisigna (Hampson, 1910)

== Cossidae ==
- Aethalopteryx squameus (Distant, 1902)
- Azygophleps tandoensis Bethune-Baker, 1927
- Pseudurgis sceliphrota Meyrick, 1923

== Crambidae ==
- Aethaloessa floridalis (Zeller, 1852)
- Euclasta varii Popescu-Gorj & Constantinescu, 1973
- Nomophila noctuella ([Denis & Schiffermüller], 1775)

== Drepanidae ==
- Epicampoptera tamsi Watson, 1965
- Gonoreta subtilis (Bryk, 1913)
- Spidia fenestrata Butler, 1878

== Eupterotidae ==
- Catajana bimaculata (Dewitz, 1879)
- Hemijana subrosea (Aurivillius, 1893)
- Jana variegata Rothschild, 1917
- Phiala costipuncta (Herrich-Schäffer, 1855)
- Stenoglene gemmatus Wichgraf, 1921

== Gelechiidae ==
- Pectinophora gossypiella (Saunders, 1844)

== Geometridae ==
- Acollesis umbrata Warren, 1899
- Afrophyla vethi (Snellen, 1886)
- Antharmostes alcaea Prout, 1930
- Aphilopota interpellans (Butler, 1875)
- Aphilopota melanostigma (Warren, 1904)
- Aphilopota strigosissima (Bastelberger, 1909)
- Asthenotricha straba Prout, 1921
- Biston abruptaria (Walker, 1869)
- Biston subocularia (Mabille, 1893)
- Cacostegania australis Warren, 1901
- Cacostegania confusa (Warren, 1901)
- Cartaletis variabilis (Butler, 1878)
- Chiasmia angolae (Bethune-Baker, 1913)
- Chiasmia conturbata (Warren, 1898)
- Chiasmia crassata (Warren, 1897)
- Chiasmia grimmia (Wallengren, 1872)
- Chiasmia kilimanjarensis (Holland, 1892)
- Chiasmia majestica (Warren, 1901)
- Chiasmia parallacta (Warren, 1897)
- Chiasmia procidata (Guenée, 1858)
- Chiasmia rhabdophora (Holland, 1892)
- Chiasmia umbrata (Warren, 1897)
- Chloroclystis insignifica Bethune-Baker, 1913
- Chlorosterrha semialba (Swinhoe, 1906)
- Cleora derogaria (Snellen, 1872)
- Cleora rostella D. S. Fletcher, 1967
- Coenina aurivena Butler, 1898
- Collesis fleximargo (Warren, 1909)
- Conchylia alternata (Warren, 1901)
- Cyclophora landanata (Mabille, 1898)
- Drepanogynis incogitata Prout, 1915
- Drepanogynis rufaria (Warren, 1909)
- Eois grataria (Walker, 1861)
- Epigynopteryx maeviaria (Guenée, 1858)
- Erastria albosignata (Walker, 1863)
- Eretmopus ampla (Warren, 1904)
- Eupithecia celatisigna (Warren, 1902)
- Geodena inferma Swinhoe, 1904
- Geodena robusta Bethune-Baker, 1911
- Geolyces convexaria (Mabille, 1890)
- Heterorachis prouti Bethune-Baker, 1913
- Idaea circumsticta (Warren, 1904)
- Idaea flamingo (Warren, 1901)
- Idaea hispidata (Warren, 1904)
- Idaea lilliputaria (Warren, 1902)
- Idaea torrida (Warren, 1904)
- Larentia attenuata (Walker, 1862)
- Lophorrhachia aenospila (Bethune-Baker, 1913)
- Miantochora polychroaria (Mabille, 1890)
- Miantochora punctuligera (Mabille, 1879)
- Miantochora venerata (Mabille, 1879)
- Microloxia ruficornis Warren, 1897
- Mixocera albistrigata (Pagenstecher, 1893)
- Mixocera obliqua Bethune-Baker, 1913
- Narthecusa tenuiorata Walker, 1862
- Nothoterpna crassisquama Warren, 1909
- Nothoterpna pallida (Warren, 1904)
- Ochroplutodes bisecta (Warren, 1904)
- Omphalucha brunnea (Warren, 1899)
- Omphalucha indigna (Prout, 1915)
- Omphalucha rufinubes Warren, 1905
- Omphax rubriceps (Warren, 1904)
- Orbamia octomaculata (Wallengren, 1872)
- Orbamia subaurata (Warren, 1899)
- Paragathia albimarginata Warren, 1902
- Phthonandria pinguis (Warren, 1904)
- Piercia ansorgei (Bethune-Baker, 1913)
- Pitthea famula Drury, 1773
- Pitthea subflaveola Bethune-Baker, 1911
- Plateoplia acrobelia (Wallengren, 1875)
- Prasinocyma pictifimbria Warren, 1904
- Prasinocyma tandi Bethune-Baker, 1913
- Proutiana perconspersa (Prout, 1915)
- Pseudolarentia megalaria (Guenée, 1858)
- Psilocerea pulverosa (Warren, 1894)
- Rhodesia alboviridata (Saalmüller, 1880)
- Rhodophthitus castus Warren, 1904
- Rhodophthitus procellosa Warren, 1905
- Rhodophthitus thapsinus Prout, 1931
- Scopula crassipuncta (Warren, 1901)
- Scopula fimbrilineata (Warren, 1902)
- Scopula latitans Prout, 1920
- Scopula lubricata (Warren, 1905)
- Scopula magnidiscata (Warren, 1904)
- Scopula penricei Prout, 1920
- Scopula rubriceps (Warren, 1905)
- Scopula sanguinisecta (Warren, 1897)
- Scopula serena Prout, 1920
- Scopula sincera (Warren, 1901)
- Scopula sinnaria Swinhoe, 1904
- Somatina virginalis Prout, 1917
- Syncollesis bellista (Bethune-Baker, 1913)
- Terina internata (Warren, 1909)
- Terina niphanda Druce, 1887
- Terina sanguinarea Bethune-Baker, 1911
- Trimetopia aetheraria Guenée, 1858
- Victoria perornata Warren, 1898
- Xenostega tincta Warren, 1899
- Zamarada acosmeta Prout, 1921
- Zamarada acrochra Prout, 1928
- Zamarada adumbrata D. S. Fletcher, 1974
- Zamarada angustimargo Warren, 1901
- Zamarada astyphela D. S. Fletcher, 1974
- Zamarada bonaberiensis Strand, 1915
- Zamarada denticatella Prout, 1922
- Zamarada dentigera Warren, 1909
- Zamarada dolorosa D. S. Fletcher, 1974
- Zamarada dyscapna D. S. Fletcher, 1974
- Zamarada euphrosyne Oberthür, 1912
- Zamarada excavata Bethune-Baker, 1913
- Zamarada fibulata D. S. Fletcher, 1974
- Zamarada flavicaput Warren, 1901
- Zamarada glareosa Bastelberger, 1909
- Zamarada gracilata D. S. Fletcher, 1974
- Zamarada hero D. S. Fletcher, 1974
- Zamarada ignicosta Prout, 1912
- Zamarada lepta D. S. Fletcher, 1974
- Zamarada melanopyga Herbulot, 1954
- Zamarada melpomene Oberthür, 1912
- Zamarada metrioscaphes Prout, 1912
- Zamarada ordinaria Bethune-Baker, 1913
- Zamarada paxilla D. S. Fletcher, 1974
- Zamarada phaeozona Hampson, 1909
- Zamarada polyctemon Prout, 1932
- Zamarada purimargo Prout, 1912
- Zamarada reflexaria (Walker, 1863)
- Zamarada seydeli D. S. Fletcher, 1974
- Zamarada terpsichore Oberthür, 1912
- Zamarada tortura D. S. Fletcher, 1974
- Zamarada unisona D. S. Fletcher, 1974
- Zamarada vigilans Prout, 1915

== Glyphipterigidae ==
- Glyphipterix leucophragma Meyrick, 1923
- Glyphipterix molybdastra Meyrick, 1923

== Hepialidae ==
- Afrotheora flavimaculata Nielsen & Scoble, 1986
- Afrotheora jordani (Viette, 1956)
- Eudalaca hololeuca (Hampson, 1910)
- Gorgopi libania (Stoll, 1781)

== Himantopteridae ==
- Doratopteryx xanthomelas Rothschild & Jordan, 1903
- Semioptila ansorgei Rothschild, 1907
- Semioptila fulveolans (Mabille, 1897)
- Semioptila lydia Weymer, 1908

== Lacturidae ==
- Gymnogramma plagiula Meyrick, 1923

== Lasiocampidae ==
- Braura truncatum (Walker, 1855)
- Catalebeda elegans Aurivillius, 1925
- Catalebeda producta (Walker, 1855)
- Cheligium lineatum (Aurivillius, 1893)
- Chrysopsyche mirifica (Butler, 1878)
- Eucraera aphrasta Tams, 1936
- Eucraera gemmata (Distant, 1897)
- Eucraera koellikerii (Dewitz, 1881)
- Euwallengrenia reducta (Walker, 1855)
- Filiola lanceolata (Hering, 1932)
- Gelo jordani (Tams, 1936)
- Gonometa bicolor Dewitz, 1881
- Grellada imitans (Aurivillius, 1893)
- Laeliopsis gemmatus (Wichgraf, 1921)
- Lechriolepis dewitzi Aurivillius, 1927
- Lechriolepis flaveola (Bethune-Baker, 1911)
- Lechriolepis rotunda Strand, 1912
- Leipoxais fuscofasciata Aurivillius, 1908
- Leipoxais peraffinis Holland, 1893
- Leipoxais proboscidea (Guérin-Méneville, 1832)
- Mallocampa zopheropa (Bethune-Baker, 1911)
- Metajana chanleri Holland, 1896
- Mimopacha gerstaeckerii (Dewitz, 1881)
- Mimopacha jordani Tams, 1936
- Mimopacha knoblauchii (Dewitz, 1881)
- Odontocheilopteryx cuanza Gurkovich & Zolotuhin, 2009
- Odontocheilopteryx phoneus Hering, 1928
- Odontopacha spissa Tams, 1929
- Pachyna subfascia (Walker, 1855)
- Pachytrina honrathii (Dewitz, 1881)
- Pachytrina papyroides (Tams, 1936)
- Pachytrina wenigina Zolotuhin & Gurkovich, 2009
- Pallastica pyrsocoma (Tams, 1936)
- Pallastica pyrsocorsa (Tams, 1936)
- Philotherma melambela Tams, 1936
- Philotherma spargata (Holland, 1893)
- Philotherma tandoensis Bethune-Baker, 1927
- Pseudolyra bubalitica Tams, 1929
- Pseudolyra caiala (Tams, 1936)
- Pseudolyra lineadentata (Bethune-Baker, 1911)
- Pseudolyra miona (Tams, 1936)
- Pseudometa jordani Tams, 1936
- Pseudometa plinthochroa Tams, 1936
- Sena quirimbo (Tams, 1936)
- Stenophatna rothschildi (Tams, 1936)
- Stoermeriana amphilecta (Tams, 1936)
- Stoermeriana coilotoma (Bethune-Baker, 1911)
- Stoermeriana pamphenges (Tams, 1936)
- Stoermeriana sminthocara (Tams, 1936)
- Streblote jordani (Tams, 1936)
- Trabala burchardi (Dewitz, 1881)
- Trichopisthia igneotincta (Aurivillius, 1909)

== Lecithoceridae ==
- Odites citromela Meyrick, 1923

== Limacodidae ==
- Altha ansorgei Bethune-Baker, 1911
- Brachia argentolineata Wichgraf, 1922
- Chrysectropa roseofasciata (Aurivillius, 1900)
- Chrysopoloma ansorgei Bethune-Baker, 1911
- Delorhachis chlorodaedala Tams, 1928
- Macroplectra hieraglyphica Bethune-Baker, 1911
- Macroplectra rosea Bethune-Baker, 1911
- Narosa barnsi Tams, 1929
- Paragetor concolor Bethune-Baker, 1911
- Paraplectra modesta Bethune-Baker, 1911
- Parasa cor West, 1940
- Parasa marginata West, 1940
- Parasa tripartita Bethune-Baker, 1911
- Phorma pepon Karsch, 1896
- Pseudomantria flava Bethune-Baker, 1911
- Taeda punctistriga Weymer, 1908
- Thoseidea lineapunctata (Bethune-Baker, 1911)
- Vipsania unicolora (Bethune-Baker, 1911)

== Lymantriidae ==
- Aclonophlebia atectonipha Collenette, 1936
- Aclonophlebia xuthomene Collenette, 1936
- Aroa leonensis Hampson, 1910
- Aroa melanoleuca Hampson, 1905
- Barlowia nephodes Collenette, 1932
- Cadurca moco Collenette, 1936
- Cadurca venata (Swinhoe, 1906)
- Cropera celaenogyia Collenette, 1936
- Cropera sericoptera Collenette, 1932
- Cropera seydeli (Hering, 1932)
- Crorema jordani Collenette, 1936
- Crorema mentiens Walker, 1855
- Crorema moco (Collenette, 1936)
- Crorema staphylinochrous Hering, 1926
- Dasychira andulo Collenette, 1936
- Dasychira dasymalla Collenette, 1936
- Dasychira exoleta Bethune-Baker, 1911
- Dasychira hyphasma Collenette, 1936
- Dasychira inconspicua Bethune-Baker, 1911
- Dasychira obsoletissima Bethune-Baker, 1911
- Dasychira perfida (Bethune-Baker, 1911)
- Dasychira pinodes (Bethune-Baker, 1911)
- Dasychira styx Bethune-Baker, 1911
- Dasychira umbrata (Bethune-Baker, 1911)
- Dasychirana obliqualinea Bethune-Baker, 1911
- Euproctis citrona Bethune-Baker, 1911
- Euproctis conionipha Collenette, 1936
- Euproctis convergens Bethune-Baker, 1911
- Euproctis dewitzi (Grünberg, 1907)
- Euproctis monophyes Swinhoe, 1906
- Euproctis ndalla Bethune-Baker, 1911
- Euproctis nigrolunulata Bethune-Baker, 1911
- Euproctis nigrosquamosa Bethune-Baker, 1911
- Euproctis ornata Wichgraf, 1921
- Euproctis reutlingeri Holland, 1893
- Euproctoides ansorgei (Jordan, 1904)
- Euproctoides ertli (Wichgraf, 1922)
- Euproctoides miniata Bethune-Baker, 1911
- Homochira rendalli (Distant, 1897)
- Knappetra fasciata (Walker, 1855)
- Lacipa gemmatula Hering, 1926
- Lacipa subpunctata Bethune-Baker, 1911
- Laelia basibrunnea (Holland, 1893)
- Laelia diascia Hampson, 1905
- Laelia haematica Hampson, 1905
- Laelia lavia Swinhoe, 1903
- Leptaroa jordani Hering, 1926
- Leucoma albissima Bethune-Baker, 1911
- Leucoma luteipes (Walker, 1855)
- Lomadonta erythrina Holland, 1893
- Lomadonta obscura Swinhoe, 1904
- Lymantria carriala Swinhoe, 1903
- Lymantriades obliqualinea Bethune-Baker, 1911
- Olapa brachycerca Collenette, 1936
- Olapa macrocerca Collenette, 1936
- Olene ruficosta (Bethune-Baker, 1911)
- Orgyia albacostata Bethune-Baker, 1911
- Otroeda catenata (Jordan, 1924)
- Otroeda vesperina Walker, 1854
- Palasea albimacula Wallengren, 1863
- Paqueta infima (Holland, 1893)
- Parapirga neurabrunnea Bethune-Baker, 1911
- Paraxena angola Bethune-Baker, 1911
- Paraxena esquamata Bethune-Baker, 1911
- Pirgula stictogonia Collenette, 1936
- Stracena promelaena (Holland, 1893)

== Metarbelidae ==
- Metarbela cymaphora Hampson, 1910
- Metarbela inconspicua Gaede, 1929
- Metarbela sphacobapta Tams, 1929
- Salagena mirabilis Le Cerf, 1919

== Noctuidae ==
- Acantholipes plumbeonitens Hampson, 1926
- Achaea sordida (Walker, 1865)
- Acontia annemaria Hacker, 2007
- Acontia antica Walker, 1862
- Acontia apatelia (Swinhoe, 1907)
- Acontia aurelia Hacker, Legrain & Fibiger, 2008
- Acontia bethunebakeri Hacker, Legrain & Fibiger, 2010
- Acontia callima Bethune-Baker, 1911
- Acontia citrelinea Bethune-Baker, 1911
- Acontia discoidea Hopffer, 1857
- Acontia gratiosa Wallengren, 1856
- Acontia guttifera Felder & Rogenhofer, 1874
- Acontia imitatrix Wallengren, 1856
- Acontia niphogona (Hampson, 1909)
- Acontia okahandja Hacker, Legrain & Fibiger, 2008
- Acontia opalinoides Guenée, 1852
- Acontia simo Wallengren, 1860
- Acontia trimaculata Aurivillius, 1879
- Acrapex apicestriata (Bethune-Baker, 1911)
- Acrapex brunnea Hampson, 1910
- Adisura callima Bethune-Baker, 1911
- Aegocera brevivitta Hampson, 1901
- Aegocera fervida (Walker, 1854)
- Aegocera rectilinea Boisduval, 1836
- Anoba glyphica (Bethune-Baker, 1911)
- Arrade stenoptera (Bethune-Baker, 1911)
- Asota speciosa (Drury, 1773)
- Aspidifrontia anomala Berio, 1955
- Athetis brunneaplagata (Bethune-Baker, 1911)
- Athetis percnopis (Bethune-Baker, 1911)
- Baniana trigrammos (Mabille, 1881)
- Brephos ansorgei (Jordan, 1904)
- Brephos nyassana (Bartel, 1903)
- Brevipecten brandbergensis Hacker, 2004
- Catada icelomorpha Bethune-Baker, 1911
- Catada ndalla Bethune-Baker, 1911
- Catephia xanthophaes (Bethune-Baker, 1911)
- Cetola pulchra (Bethune-Baker, 1911)
- Chaetostephana inclusa (Karsch, 1895)
- Chaetostephana rendalli (Rothschild, 1896)
- Charitosemia geraldi (Kirby, 1896)
- Chlumetia lichenosa (Hampson, 1902)
- Choeropais jucunda (Jordan, 1904)
- Cirrodiana bella Bethune-Baker, 1911
- Corgatha macariodes Hampson, 1910
- Crameria amabilis (Drury, 1773)
- Cyligramma limacina (Guérin-Méneville, 1832)
- Cyligramma magus (Guérin-Méneville, [1844])
- Diaphone angolensis Weymer, 1901
- Diparopsis tephragramma Bethune-Baker, 1911
- Enispades angola Bethune-Baker, 1911
- Enispades nigropunctata Bethune-Baker, 1911
- Entomogramma pardus Guenée, 1852
- Erebus walkeri (Butler, 1875)
- Ethionodes brunneaplaga (Bethune-Baker, 1911)
- Ethiopica aenictopis (Bethune-Baker, 1911)
- Ethiopica leucostigmata Bethune-Baker, 1911
- Eublemma acarodes Swinhoe, 1907
- Eublemma basiplagata Bethune-Baker, 1911
- Eublemma nigribasis Bethune-Baker, 1911
- Eublemma nyctopa Bethune-Baker, 1911
- Eustrotia amydra (Swinhoe, 1907)
- Eustrotia bella Bethune-Baker, 1911
- Eustrotia loxosema Bethune-Baker, 1911
- Eutelia adoxodes Bethune-Baker, 1911
- Eutelia malanga Bethune-Baker, 1911
- Gortynodes holophaea Bethune-Baker, 1911
- Heliophisma klugii (Boisduval, 1833)
- Heraclia jugans (Jordan, 1913)
- Heraclia pardalina (Walker, 1869)
- Hypena isosocles (Bethune-Baker, 1911)
- Hypopleurona acutissima (Bethune-Baker, 1911)
- Lophoruza semiscripta (Mabille, 1893)
- Marcipa angulina (Mabille, 1881)
- Marcipa maculifera (Mabille, 1881)
- Marcipa pammicta (Bethune-Baker, 1911)
- Masalia disticta (Hampson, 1902)
- Masalia flavistrigata (Hampson, 1903)
- Masalia galatheae (Wallengren, 1856)
- Masalia quilengesi Seymour, 1972
- Masalia sublimis (Berio, 1962)
- Masalia terracottoides (Rothschild, 1921)
- Massaga monteirona Butler, 1874
- Mitrophrys gynandra Jordan, 1913
- Naarda fuliginaria (Bethune-Baker, 1911)
- Naarda tandoana (Bethune-Baker, 1911)
- Neuranethes angola Bethune-Baker, 1911
- Nodaria melanopa Bethune-Baker, 1911
- Nodaria parallela Bethune-Baker, 1911
- Nonagria connexa (Bethune-Baker, 1911)
- Nyodes brevicornis (Walker, 1857)
- Oglasa ansorgei (Bethune-Baker, 1913)
- Paralophata ansorgei Bethune-Baker, 1911
- Parasiopsis arcuata Bethune-Baker, 1911
- Perigea aplecta Bethune-Baker, 1911
- Phaegorista similis Walker, 1869
- Plecoptera misera (Butler, 1883)
- Polydesma umbricola Boisduval, 1833
- Polypogon zammodia (Bethune-Baker, 1911)
- Ramesodes nycteris Bethune-Baker, 1911
- Rivula ochrea (Bethune-Baker, 1911)
- Rougeotiana xanthoperas (Hampson, 1926)
- Sarmatia albolineata Bethune-Baker, 1911
- Sesamia calamistis Hampson, 1910
- Sphingomorpha chlorea (Cramer, 1777)
- Syngatha elegans Bethune-Baker, 1913
- Thiacidas callipona (Bethune-Baker, 1911)
- Thiacidas mukim (Berio, 1977)
- Thiacidas schausi (Hampson, 1905)
- Thiacidas senex (Bethune-Baker, 1911)
- Trigonodes angolensis (Weymer, 1908)
- Trigonodes hyppasia (Cramer, 1779)
- Ugia egcarsia (Bethune-Baker, 1911)

== Nolidae ==
- Bryophilopsis anomoiota (Bethune-Baker, 1911)
- Eligma hypsoides (Walker, 1869)
- Giaura bostrycodes (Bethune-Baker, 1911)
- Gigantoceras adoxodes Bethune-Baker, 1911
- Nola angola Bethune-Baker, 1911
- Selepa ianthina (Bethune-Baker, 1911)
- Trogoxestis crenularia (Bethune-Baker, 1911)

== Notodontidae ==
- Afroplitis orestes (Kiriakoff, 1955)
- Afropydna angolensis Kiriakoff, 1961
- Anaphe venata Butler, 1878
- Antheua benguelana Viette, 1954
- Antheua delicata Bethune-Baker, 1911
- Antheua gallans (Karsch, 1895)
- Antheua ornata (Walker, 1865)
- Antheua trifasciata (Hampson, 1909)
- Antheuella psolometopa (Tams, 1929)
- Arciera angolensis Kiriakoff, 1979
- Atrasana olivacea Kiriakoff, 1955
- Bisolita pembertoni (Rothschild, 1910)
- Brachychira ferruginea Aurivillius, 1905
- Desmeocraera decorata (Wichgraf, 1922)
- Epicerura steniptera (Hampson, 1910)
- Eujansea afra (Bethune-Baker, 1911)
- Eujansea crenata (Kiriakoff, 1962)
- Galona serena Karsch, 1895
- Haplozana nigrolineata Aurivillius, 1901
- Janthinisca postlutea (Kiriakoff, 1959)
- Leptolepida varians Kiriakoff, 1962
- Lopiena ochracea (Bethune-Baker, 1911)
- Notoxantha sesamiodes Hampson, 1910
- Odontoperas janthina Kiriakoff, 1959
- Phalera atrata (Grünberg, 1907)
- Phycitimorpha hollandi (Bethune-Baker, 1911)
- Stenostaura columbina Kiriakoff, 1979
- Stenostaura malangae (Bethune-Baker, 1911)
- Stenostaura varians (Kiriakoff, 1962)
- Subscrancia nigra (Aurivillius, 1904)
- Trotonotus crenulata Bethune-Baker, 1911

== Oecophoridae ==
- Epiphractis phoenicis Meyrick, 1908

== Prototheoridae ==
- Prototheora angolae Davis, 1996

== Psychidae ==
- Acanthopsyche carbonarius Karsch, 1900
- Eumeta mercieri Bourgogne, 1966
- Eumeta rougeoti Bourgogne, 1955
- Lytrophila sporocentra Meyrick, 1923
- Melasina inimica Meyrick, 1908
- Melasina isospila Meyrick, 1908
- Monda cassualallae Bethune-Baker, 1911
- Monda fragilissima Strand, 1911

== Pterophoridae ==
- Agdistis bouyeri Gielis, 2008
- Paracapperia esuriens (Meyrick, 1932)

== Pyralidae ==
- Sindris magnifica Jordan, 1904

== Saturniidae ==
- Adafroptilum occidaneum Darge, 2008
- Athletes gigas (Sonthonnax, 1902)
- Aurivillius arata (Westwood, 1849)
- Aurivillius triramis Rothschild, 1907
- Bunaea alcinoe (Stoll, 1780)
- Bunaeopsis angolana (Le Cerf, 1918)
- Bunaeopsis annabellae Lemaire & Rougeot, 1975
- Bunaeopsis aurantiaca (Rothschild, 1895)
- Bunaeopsis hersilia (Westwood, 1849)
- Bunaeopsis jacksoni (Jordan, 1908)
- Bunaeopsis oubie (Guérin-Méneville, 1849)
- Bunaeopsis princeps (Le Cerf, 1918)
- Campimoptilum kuntzei (Dewitz, 1881)
- Cinabra hyperbius (Westwood, 1881)
- Cirina forda (Westwood, 1849)
- Decachorda rosea Aurivillius, 1898
- Epiphora albidus (Druce, 1886)
- Epiphora vacuna (Westwood, 1849)
- Eudaemonia trogophylla Hampson, 1919
- Gonimbrasia belina (Westwood, 1849)
- Gonimbrasia congolensis Bouvier, 1927
- Gonimbrasia rectilineata (Sonthonnax, 1899)
- Goodia oxytela Jordan, 1922
- Gynanisa ata Strand, 1911
- Heniocha dyops (Maassen, 1872)
- Holocerina agomensis (Karsch, 1896)
- Holocerina angulata (Aurivillius, 1893)
- Imbrasia epimethea (Drury, 1772)
- Imbrasia ertli Rebel, 1904
- Imbrasia obscura (Butler, 1878)
- Lobobunaea acetes (Westwood, 1849)
- Lobobunaea angasana (Westwood, 1849)
- Lobobunaea niepelti Strand, 1914
- Lobobunaea phaedusa (Drury, 1782)
- Lobobunaea saturnus (Fabricius, 1793)
- Ludia arida Jordan, 1938
- Ludia orinoptena Karsch, 1892
- Melanocera parva Rothschild, 1907
- Micragone agathylla (Westwood, 1849)
- Micragone ansorgei (Rothschild, 1907)
- Nudaurelia anthina (Karsch, 1892)
- Nudaurelia anthinoides Rougeot, 1978
- Nudaurelia bouvieri (Le Moult, 1933)
- Nudaurelia dione (Fabricius, 1793)
- Nudaurelia eblis Strecker, 1876
- Nudaurelia gueinzii (Staudinger, 1872)
- Nudaurelia macrops Rebel, 1917
- Nudaurelia macrothyris (Rothschild, 1906)
- Orthogonioptilum prox Karsch, 1892
- Orthogonioptilum vestigiata (Holland, 1893)
- Pselaphelia gemmifera (Butler, 1878)
- Pseudantheraea discrepans (Butler, 1878)
- Pseudantheraea imperator Rougeot, 1962
- Pseudimbrasia deyrollei (J. Thomson, 1858)
- Pseudobunaea alinda (Sonthonnax, 1899)
- Pseudobunaea callista (Jordan, 1910)
- Pseudobunaea cleopatra (Aurivillius, 1893)
- Pseudobunaea heyeri (Weymer, 1896)
- Pseudobunaea irius (Fabricius, 1793)
- Pseudobunaea tyrrhena (Westwood, 1849)
- Rohaniella pygmaea (Maassen & Weymer, 1885)
- Urota sinope (Westwood, 1849)
- Usta terpsichore (Maassen & Weymer, 1885)

== Sesiidae ==
- Euhagena nobilis (Druce, 1910)
- Nyctaegeria rohani Le Cerf, 1915
- Tipulamima hypocilla Le Cerf, 1937

== Sphingidae ==
- Acanthosphinx guessfeldti (Dewitz, 1879)
- Acherontia atropos (Linnaeus, 1758)
- Afrosphinx amabilis (Jordan, 1911)
- Agrius convolvuli (Linnaeus, 1758)
- Atemnora westermannii (Boisduval, 1875)
- Basiothia aureata (Karsch, 1891)
- Basiothia charis (Boisduval, 1875)
- Basiothia medea (Fabricius, 1781)
- Cephonodes hylas (Linnaeus, 1771)
- Chloroclanis virescens (Butler, 1882)
- Coelonia fulvinotata (Butler, 1875)
- Daphnis nerii (Linnaeus, 1758)
- Euchloron megaera (Linnaeus, 1758)
- Hippotion balsaminae (Walker, 1856)
- Hippotion celerio (Linnaeus, 1758)
- Hippotion eson (Cramer, 1779)
- Hippotion osiris (Dalman, 1823)
- Hoplistopus penricei Rothschild & Jordan, 1903
- Leptoclanis pulchra Rothschild & Jordan, 1903
- Leucophlebia afra Karsch, 1891
- Lophostethus dumolinii (Angas, 1849)
- Lycosphingia hamatus (Dewitz, 1879)
- Macroglossum trochilus (Hübner, 1823)
- Neoclanis basalis (Walker, 1866)
- Neopolyptychus prionites (Rothschild & Jordan, 1916)
- Neopolyptychus pygarga (Karsch, 1891)
- Nephele accentifera (Palisot de Beauvois, 1821)
- Nephele aequivalens (Walker, 1856)
- Nephele comma Hopffer, 1857
- Nephele funebris (Fabricius, 1793)
- Nephele peneus (Cramer, 1776)
- Nephele rosae Butler, 1875
- Pantophaea favillacea (Walker, 1866)
- Phylloxiphia bicolor (Rothschild, 1894)
- Platysphinx constrigilis (Walker, 1869)
- Platysphinx stigmatica (Mabille, 1878)
- Polyptychoides digitatus (Karsch, 1891)
- Polyptychopsis marshalli (Rothschild & Jordan, 1903)
- Polyptychus coryndoni Rothschild & Jordan, 1903
- Polyptychus murinus Rothschild, 1904
- Polyptychus orthographus Rothschild & Jordan, 1903
- Praedora marshalli Rothschild & Jordan, 1903
- Pseudoclanis rhadamistus (Fabricius, 1781)
- Rhadinopasa hornimani (Druce, 1880)
- Rufoclanis numosae (Wallengren, 1860)
- Rufoclanis rosea (Druce, 1882)
- Sphingonaepiopsis ansorgei Rothschild, 1904
- Sphingonaepiopsis nana (Walker, 1856)
- Temnora albilinea Rothschild, 1904
- Temnora elegans (Rothschild, 1895)
- Temnora fumosa (Walker, 1856)
- Temnora funebris (Holland, 1893)
- Temnora radiata (Karsch, 1892)
- Temnora sardanus (Walker, 1856)
- Temnora scitula (Holland, 1889)
- Xanthopan morganii (Walker, 1856)

== Thyrididae ==
- Arniocera amoena Jordan, 1907
- Chrysotypus quadratus Whalley, 1971
- Dysodia vitrina (Boisduval, 1829)
- Dysodia zelleri (Dewitz, 1881)
- Hapana minima Whalley, 1971
- Kuja obliquifascia (Warren, 1908)
- Marmax hyparchus (Cramer, 1779)
- Netrocera basalis Jordan, 1907

== Tineidae ==
- Cimitra horridella (Walker, 1863)

== Tortricidae ==
- Bactra difissa Diakonoff, 1964
- Bactra legitima Meyrick, 1911
- Bactra nea Diakonoff, 1964
- Bactra philocherda Diakonoff, 1964
- Bactra stagnicolana Zeller, 1852
- Eccopsis incultana (Walker, 1863)
- Eccopsis praecedens Walsingham, 1897
- Epichorista aethocoma Meyrick, 1923
- Eucosma anisodelta Meyrick, 1923
- Eucosma carcharitis Meyrick, 1923
- Multiquaestia albimaculana Karisch, 2005

== Uraniidae ==
- Epiplema nigrodorsata Warren, 1901

== Zygaenidae ==
- Epiorna ochreipennis (Butler, 1874)
- Neobalataea leptis (Jordan, 1907)
- Orna angolensis Alberti, 1961

== See also ==
- List of butterflies of Angola
