= Onychipodia straminea =

Scientific classification
- Kingdom: Animalia
- Phylum: Arthropoda
- Class: Insecta
- Order: Lepidoptera
- Superfamily: Noctuoidea
- Family: Erebidae
- Subfamily: Arctiinae
- Genus: Onychipodia
- Species: O. straminea

Binomial name
- Onychipodia straminea Hampson, 1914

Species of moth

Onychipodia straminea is a moth of the subfamily Arctiinae. It was described by George Hampson in 1914. It is found in Uganda.
