= Stenarctia griseipennis =

Scientific classification
- Kingdom: Animalia
- Phylum: Arthropoda
- Class: Insecta
- Order: Lepidoptera
- Superfamily: Noctuoidea
- Family: Erebidae
- Subfamily: Arctiinae
- Genus: Stenarctia
- Species: S. griseipennis

Binomial name
- Stenarctia griseipennis Hampson, 1911

Species of moth

Stenarctia griseipennis is a moth in the subfamily Arctiinae. It is found in Nigeria.
