= Afrospilarctia =

Scientific classification
- Domain: Eukaryota
- Kingdom: Animalia
- Phylum: Arthropoda
- Class: Insecta
- Order: Lepidoptera
- Superfamily: Noctuoidea
- Family: Erebidae
- Subfamily: Arctiinae
- Subtribe: Spilosomina
- Genus: Afrospilarctia; Dubatolov, 2006

Type species
- Euchaetes lucida Druce, 1898

Genus of moths

Afrospilarctia is a genus of tiger moths in the family Erebidae and are found in the Afrotropics.

== Species ==
- Afrospilarctia dentivalva Dubatolov, 2011
- Afrospilarctia dissimilis (Distant, 1897)
- Afrospilarctia flavidus (Bartel, 1903)
- Afrospilarctia lucida (Druce, 1898)
- Afrospilarctia unipuncta (Hampson, 1905)
