= Pachnistis inhonesta =

Scientific classification
- Domain: Eukaryota
- Kingdom: Animalia
- Phylum: Arthropoda
- Class: Insecta
- Order: Lepidoptera
- Family: Autostichidae
- Genus: Pachnistis
- Species: P. inhonesta

Binomial name
- Pachnistis inhonesta Meyrick, 1916

Species of moth

Pachnistis inhonesta is a moth in the family Autostichidae. It was described by Edward Meyrick in 1916. It is found in India.

The wingspan is about 13 mm. The forewings are purplish grey suffusedly irrorated (sprinkled) with dark fuscous. The plical and first discal stigmata are cloudy, dark fuscous, edged posteriorly with grey whitish, the plical beneath the first discal, the second discal represented by a subtriangular cloudy grey-whitish dot. There is a subterminal series of small cloudy-whitish dots from four-fifths of the costa to the tornus, sharply indented above the middle. The hindwings are grey.
