= Pachnistis phaeoptila =

Scientific classification
- Kingdom: Animalia
- Phylum: Arthropoda
- Clade: Pancrustacea
- Class: Insecta
- Order: Lepidoptera
- Family: Autostichidae
- Genus: Pachnistis
- Species: P. phaeoptila

Binomial name
- Pachnistis phaeoptila Bradley, 1961

Species of moth

Pachnistis phaeoptila is a moth in the family Autostichidae. It was described by John David Bradley in 1961 and is found in Java, Indonesia.
