= Afrotheora thermodes =

Scientific classification
- Kingdom: Animalia
- Phylum: Arthropoda
- Class: Insecta
- Order: Lepidoptera
- Family: Hepialidae
- Genus: Afrotheora
- Species: A. thermodes

Binomial name
- Afrotheora thermodes (Meyrick, 1921)

Synonyms
- Hepialus thermodes Meyrick, 1921; Hepialus pardalias Janse, 1942

Species of moth

Afrotheora thermodes is a species of moth of the family Hepialidae. It is known from South Africa.
