= Afrotheora =

Scientific classification
- Kingdom: Animalia
- Phylum: Arthropoda
- Clade: Pancrustacea
- Class: Insecta
- Order: Lepidoptera
- Family: Hepialidae
- Genus: Afrotheora; Nielsen & Scoble, 1986

Species
- See text

Genus of moths

Afrotheora is a genus of moths of the family Hepialidae. There are seven described species, all found in southern Africa. They are considered to be one of the more primitive genera of the Hepialidae, with short antennae and lacking a functional proboscis.

== Species ==
- Afrotheora argentimaculata – South Africa
- Afrotheora brevivalva – Tanzania
- Afrotheora flavimaculata – Angola
- Afrotheora jordani – Angola
- Afrotheora minirhodaula – South Africa
- Afrotheora rhodaula – South Africa
- Afrotheora thermodes – South Africa
