= Afrospilarctia dentivalva =

Scientific classification
- Kingdom: Animalia
- Phylum: Arthropoda
- Clade: Pancrustacea
- Class: Insecta
- Order: Lepidoptera
- Superfamily: Noctuoidea
- Family: Erebidae
- Subfamily: Arctiinae
- Genus: Afrospilarctia
- Species: A. dentivalva

Binomial name
- Afrospilarctia dentivalva Dubatolov, 2011

Species of moth

Afrospilarctia dentivalva is a moth of the family Erebidae. It was described by Vladimir Viktorovitch Dubatolov in 2011. It can be found in Zambia.
