= Afrospilarctia dissimilis =

Scientific classification
- Domain: Eukaryota
- Kingdom: Animalia
- Phylum: Arthropoda
- Class: Insecta
- Order: Lepidoptera
- Superfamily: Noctuoidea
- Family: Erebidae
- Subfamily: Arctiinae
- Genus: Afrospilarctia
- Species: A. dissimilis

Binomial name
- Afrospilarctia dissimilis (Distant, 1897)

Synonyms
- Spilosoma dissimilis Distant, 1897

Species of moth

Afrospilarctia dissimilis is a moth of the family Erebidae. It was described by William Lucas Distant in 1897. It is found in Lesotho and South Africa.

The larvae feed on Vernonia gerrardi.
