= Stenarctia =

Scientific classification
- Domain: Eukaryota
- Kingdom: Animalia
- Phylum: Arthropoda
- Class: Insecta
- Order: Lepidoptera
- Superfamily: Noctuoidea
- Family: Erebidae
- Subfamily: Arctiinae
- Tribe: Arctiini
- Genus: Stenarctia; Aurivillius, 1899

Synonyms
- Macronyx Felder, 1874 (preocc.)

Genus of moths

Stenarctia is a genus of moths in the subfamily Arctiinae erected by Per Olof Christopher Aurivillius in 1899.

== Species ==
- Stenarctia abdominalis
- Stenarctia griseipennis
- Stenarctia quadripunctata
- Stenarctia rothi
