= Catalebeda elegans =

Scientific classification
- Kingdom: Animalia
- Phylum: Arthropoda
- Class: Insecta
- Order: Lepidoptera
- Family: Lasiocampidae
- Subfamily: Lasiocampinae
- Genus: Catalebeda
- Species: C. elegans

Binomial name
- Catalebeda elegans Aurivillius, 1925

Synonyms
- Catalebeda elegans meridionalis Tams, 1936

Species of moth

Catalebeda elegans is a moth species in the genus Catalebeda found in Angola and Cameroon.

== See also ==
- List of moths of Angola
- List of moths of Cameroon
