= Onychipodia =

Scientific classification
- Kingdom: Animalia
- Phylum: Arthropoda
- Class: Insecta
- Order: Lepidoptera
- Superfamily: Noctuoidea
- Family: Erebidae
- Subfamily: Arctiinae
- Tribe: Lithosiini
- Genus: Onychipodia; Hampson, 1900

Genus of moths

Onychipodia is a genus of moths in the subfamily Arctiinae. The genus was erected by George Hampson in 1900.

== Species ==
- Onychipodia flavithorax Rothschild, 1912
- Onychipodia nigricostata Butler, 1894
- Onychipodia straminea Hampson, 1914
