= Pachnistis arens =

Scientific classification
- Domain: Eukaryota
- Kingdom: Animalia
- Phylum: Arthropoda
- Class: Insecta
- Order: Lepidoptera
- Family: Autostichidae
- Genus: Pachnistis
- Species: P. arens

Binomial name
- Pachnistis arens Meyrick, 1913

Species of moth

Pachnistis arens is a moth in the family Autostichidae. It was described by Edward Meyrick in 1913. It is found in Bengal.

The wingspan is about 13 mm. The forewings are whitish irrorated (sprinkled) with grey. The stigmata are grey, the plical slightly before the first discal. The hindwings are whitish grey.
