= Pachnistis craniota =

Scientific classification
- Kingdom: Animalia
- Phylum: Arthropoda
- Class: Insecta
- Order: Lepidoptera
- Family: Autostichidae
- Genus: Pachnistis
- Species: P. craniota

Binomial name
- Pachnistis craniota (Meyrick, 1913)

Synonyms
- Lecithocera craniota Meyrick, 1913; Lecithocera propitia Meyrick, 1913; Pachnistis consors Meyrick, 1921

Species of moth

Pachnistis craniota is a moth in the family Autostichidae. It was described by Edward Meyrick in 1913. It is found in South Africa.

The wingspan is 12–14 mm. The forewings are bronzy grey or dark purplish fuscous, suffusedly irrorated (sprinkled) with dark fuscous. The hindwings are grey whitish.
