= Pachnistis nigropunctella =

Scientific classification
- Kingdom: Animalia
- Phylum: Arthropoda
- Class: Insecta
- Order: Lepidoptera
- Family: Autostichidae
- Genus: Pachnistis
- Species: P. nigropunctella

Binomial name
- Pachnistis nigropunctella Viette, 1955

Species of moth

Pachnistis nigropunctella is a moth in the family Autostichidae. It was described by Viette in 1955. It is found in Madagascar.
