= Pachnistis cephalochra =

Scientific classification
- Domain: Eukaryota
- Kingdom: Animalia
- Phylum: Arthropoda
- Class: Insecta
- Order: Lepidoptera
- Family: Autostichidae
- Genus: Pachnistis
- Species: P. cephalochra

Binomial name
- Pachnistis cephalochra Meyrick, 1907

Species of moth

Pachnistis cephalochra is a moth in the family Autostichidae. It was described by Edward Meyrick in 1907. It is found in the Punjab region of what was British India and in Bhutan.

The wingspan is about 15 mm. The forewings are rather dark fuscous, sprinkled with light greyish ochreous. The hindwings are fuscous, paler towards the base.
