= Afrotheora minirhodaula =

Scientific classification
- Kingdom: Animalia
- Phylum: Arthropoda
- Clade: Pancrustacea
- Class: Insecta
- Order: Lepidoptera
- Family: Hepialidae
- Genus: Afrotheora
- Species: A. minirhodaula

Binomial name
- Afrotheora minirhodaula Nielsen & Scoble, 1986

Species of moth

Afrotheora minirhodaula is a species of moth of the family Hepialidae. It is found in South Africa.
