= Ischnarctia =

Scientific classification
- Domain: Eukaryota
- Kingdom: Animalia
- Phylum: Arthropoda
- Class: Insecta
- Order: Lepidoptera
- Superfamily: Noctuoidea
- Family: Erebidae
- Subfamily: Arctiinae
- Subtribe: Nyctemerina
- Genus: Ischnarctia; Bartel, 1903

Synonyms
- Bithra Fawcett, 1918 (preocc.)

Genus of moths

Ischnarctia is a genus of tiger moths in the family Erebidae erected by German entomologist Max Bartel in 1903.

== Species ==
- Ischnarctia brunnescens Bartel, 1903
- Ischnarctia cinerea (Pagenstecher, 1903)
- Ischnarctia oberthueri (Rothschild, 1910)
