= Afrotheora rhodaula =

Scientific classification
- Kingdom: Animalia
- Phylum: Arthropoda
- Class: Insecta
- Order: Lepidoptera
- Family: Hepialidae
- Genus: Afrotheora
- Species: A. rhodaula

Binomial name
- Afrotheora rhodaula (Meyrick, 1926)

Synonyms
- Dalaca rhodaula Meyrick, 1926

Species of moth

Afrotheora rhodaula is a species of moth of the family Hepialidae. It is native to South Africa.
