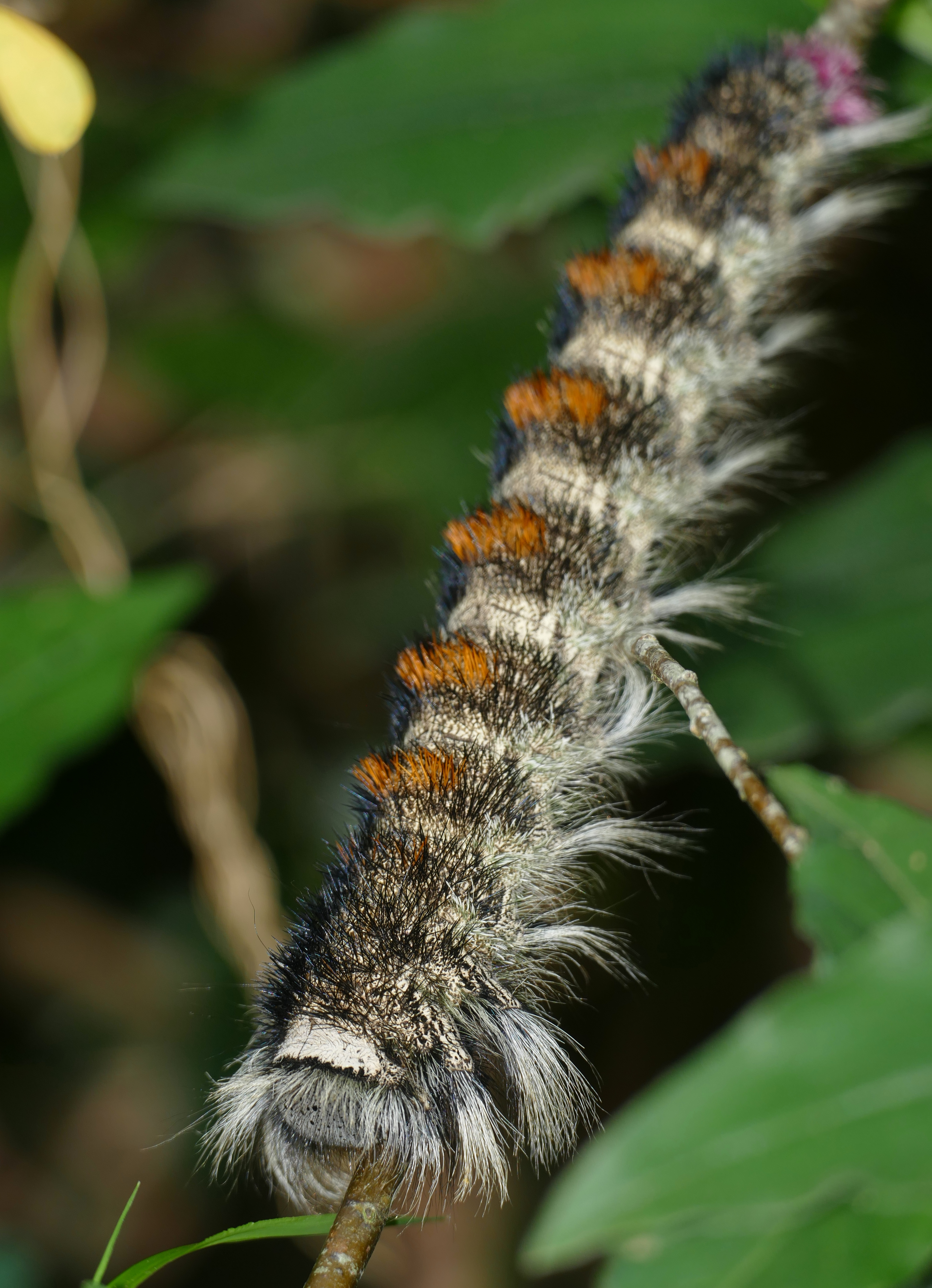
- Catalebeda cuneilinea, South Africa

Scientific classification
- Kingdom: Animalia
- Phylum: Arthropoda
- Clade: Pancrustacea
- Class: Insecta
- Order: Lepidoptera
- Family: Lasiocampidae
- Subfamily: Lasiocampinae
- Genus: Catalebeda; Aurivillius, 1902

= Catalebeda =

Genus of moths

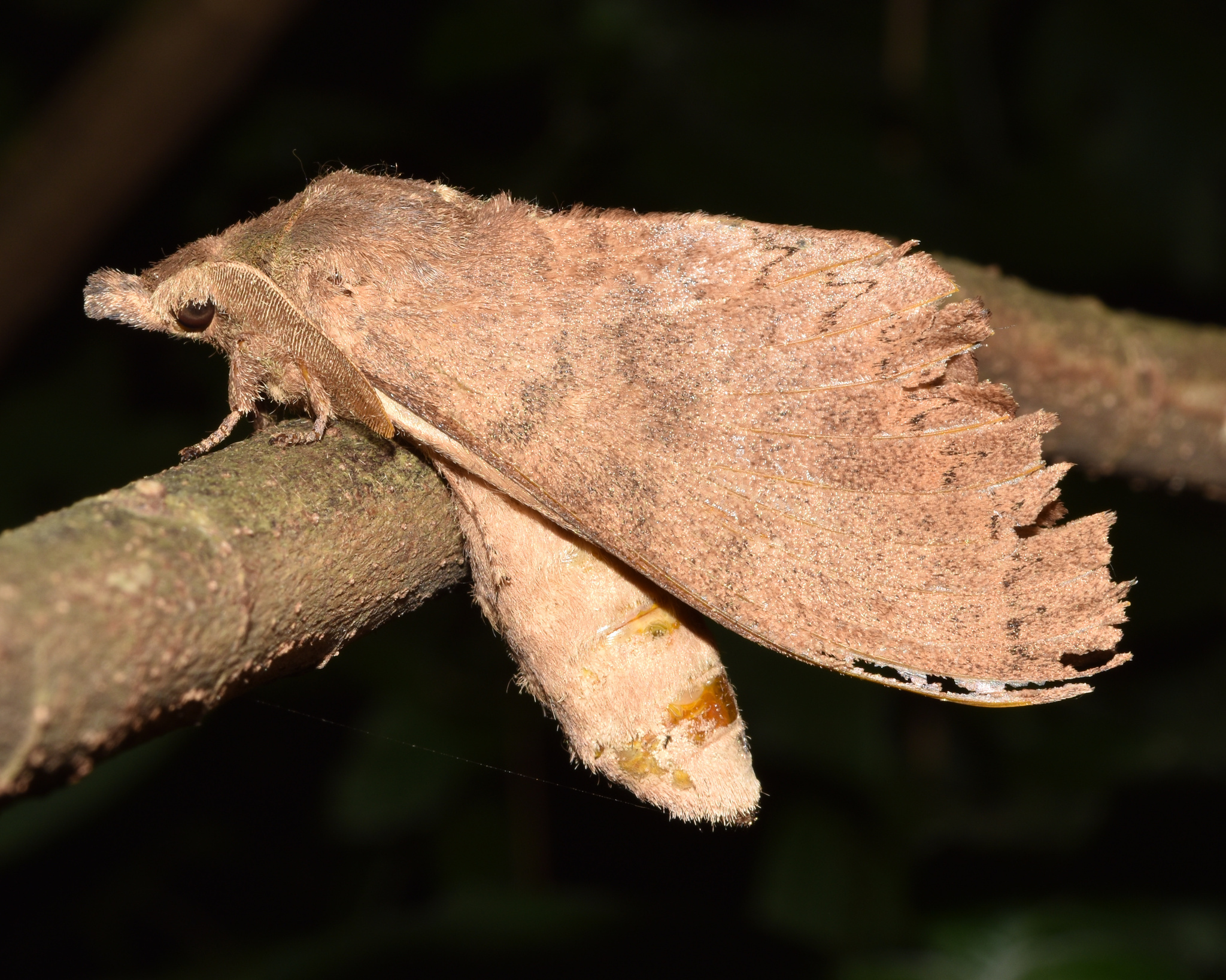
Catalebeda cuneilinea, South Africa

Catalebeda is a genus of moths in the family Lasiocampidae. The genus was identified by Per Olof Christopher Aurivillius in 1902.

== Selected species ==
- Catalebeda bimaculata Strand, 1913
- Catalebeda cuneilinea Walker, 1856
- Catalebeda discocellularis Strand, 1912
- Catalebeda elegans Aurivillius
- Catalebeda intermedia Aurivillius, 1925
- Catalebeda jamesoni Bethune-Baker, 1908
- Catalebeda meridionalis
- Catalebeda producta Walker, 1855
- Catalebeda strandi Aurivillius, 1927
- Catalebeda tamsi Hering, 1932
- Catalebeda violascens
