= Stenarctia rothi =

Scientific classification
- Domain: Eukaryota
- Kingdom: Animalia
- Phylum: Arthropoda
- Class: Insecta
- Order: Lepidoptera
- Superfamily: Noctuoidea
- Family: Erebidae
- Subfamily: Arctiinae
- Genus: Stenarctia
- Species: S. rothi

Binomial name
- Stenarctia rothi Rothschild, 1933

Species of moth

Stenarctia rothi is a moth in the subfamily Arctiinae. It is found in Nigeria.
