= Pachnistis fulvocapitella =

Scientific classification
- Domain: Eukaryota
- Kingdom: Animalia
- Phylum: Arthropoda
- Class: Insecta
- Order: Lepidoptera
- Family: Autostichidae
- Genus: Pachnistis
- Species: P. fulvocapitella

Binomial name
- Pachnistis fulvocapitella Legrand, 1966

Species of moth

Pachnistis fulvocapitella is a moth in the family Autostichidae. It was described by Henry Legrand in 1966. It is found on Mahé and Praslin, both in the Seychelles.
