= Pachnistis cremnobathra =

Scientific classification
- Domain: Eukaryota
- Kingdom: Animalia
- Phylum: Arthropoda
- Class: Insecta
- Order: Lepidoptera
- Family: Autostichidae
- Genus: Pachnistis
- Species: P. cremnobathra

Binomial name
- Pachnistis cremnobathra Meyrick, 1922

Species of moth

Pachnistis cremnobathra is a moth in the family Autostichidae. It was described by Edward Meyrick in 1922. It is found on Java in Indonesia.

The wingspan is 14–17 mm. The forewings are pale ochreous suffused with brownish, and irrorated (sprinkled) with fuscous and dark fuscous. There is a dark fuscous basal fascia, narrow on the costa but rather wide on the dorsum, edged with an irregular prominence in the middle. The stigmata are dark fuscous, the plical rather obliquely beyond the first discal, with obscure pale spaces following each and connecting the discal. There is a variable subterminal shade of darker brown suffusion, angulated inwards beneath the costa and outwards above the middle. There is also a terminal series of dark fuscous dots. The hindwings are ochreous whitish.
