= Pachnistis =

Scientific classification
- Kingdom: Animalia
- Phylum: Arthropoda
- Class: Insecta
- Order: Lepidoptera
- Family: Autostichidae
- Subfamily: Autostichinae
- Genus: Pachnistis; Meyrick, 1907

Genus of moths

Pachnistis is a genus of moths in the family Autostichidae.

== Species ==
The species of this genus are:

- Pachnistis arens Meyrick, 1913 (India)
- Pachnistis cephalochra Meyrick, 1907 (Bhutan, India)
- Pachnistis craniota (Meyrick, 1913) (South Africa)
- Pachnistis cremnobathra Meyrick, 1922 (Java)
- Pachnistis fulvocapitella Legrand, 1966 (Seychelles)
- Pachnistis inhonesta Meyrick, 1916 (India)
- Pachnistis morologa Meyrick, 1923 (Angola)
- Pachnistis nigropunctella Viette, 1955 (Madagascar)
- Pachnistis nubivaga Meyrick, 1921 (Celebes)
- Pachnistis phaeoptila Bradley, 1961 (Java)
- Pachnistis silens Meyrick, 1935 (Taiwan)
