= Ischnarctia cinerea =

Scientific classification
- Domain: Eukaryota
- Kingdom: Animalia
- Phylum: Arthropoda
- Class: Insecta
- Order: Lepidoptera
- Superfamily: Noctuoidea
- Family: Erebidae
- Subfamily: Arctiinae
- Genus: Ischnarctia
- Species: I. cinerea

Binomial name
- Ischnarctia cinerea (Pagenstecher, 1903)

Synonyms
- Secusio cinerea Pagenstecher, 1903; Bithra aganice Fawcett, 1918; Ischnarctia cinera Sharp, 1904

Species of moth

Ischnarctia cinerea is a moth of the subfamily Arctiinae. It is found in the Democratic Republic of Congo, Ethiopia, Kenya and Tanzania.
