= Pachnistis nubivaga =

Scientific classification
- Domain: Eukaryota
- Kingdom: Animalia
- Phylum: Arthropoda
- Class: Insecta
- Order: Lepidoptera
- Family: Autostichidae
- Genus: Pachnistis
- Species: P. nubivaga

Binomial name
- Pachnistis nubivaga Meyrick, 1921

Species of moth

Pachnistis nubivaga is a moth in the family Autostichidae. It was described by Edward Meyrick in 1921. It is found on Sulawesi in Indonesia.

The wingspan is about 14 mm. The forewings are fuscous, slightly violet tinged, obscurely speckled with grey whitish. The discal stigmata are cloudy, darker, the second rather large. The hindwings are light grey.
