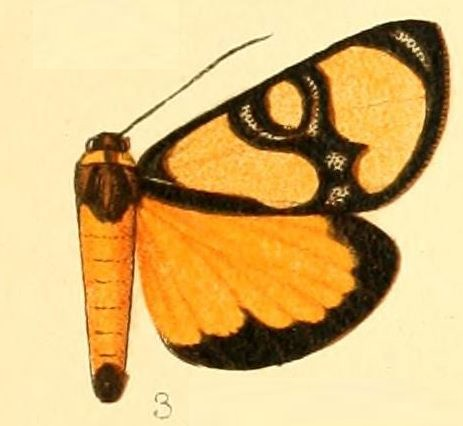
- Chaetostephana inclusa

Scientific classification
- Domain: Eukaryota
- Kingdom: Animalia
- Phylum: Arthropoda
- Class: Insecta
- Order: Lepidoptera
- Superfamily: Noctuoidea
- Family: Noctuidae
- Subfamily: Agaristinae
- Genus: Chaetostephana; Jordan, 1913

= Chaetostephana =

Genus of moths

Chaetostephana is a genus of moths of the family Noctuidae.

== Species ==
- Chaetostephana inclusa (Karsch, 1895)
- Chaetostephana rendalli (Rothschild, 1896)
