= Pachnistis silens =

Scientific classification
- Domain: Eukaryota
- Kingdom: Animalia
- Phylum: Arthropoda
- Class: Insecta
- Order: Lepidoptera
- Family: Autostichidae
- Genus: Pachnistis
- Species: P. silens

Binomial name
- Pachnistis silens Meyrick, 1935

Species of moth

Pachnistis silens is a moth in the family Autostichidae. It was described by Edward Meyrick in 1935. It is found in Taiwan.
