= Onychipodia nigricostata =

Scientific classification
- Domain: Eukaryota
- Kingdom: Animalia
- Phylum: Arthropoda
- Class: Insecta
- Order: Lepidoptera
- Superfamily: Noctuoidea
- Family: Erebidae
- Subfamily: Arctiinae
- Genus: Onychipodia
- Species: O. nigricostata

Binomial name
- Onychipodia nigricostata (Butler, 1894)

Synonyms
- Ghoria nigricostata Butler, 1894; Onychipodia bimarginata Rothschild, 1912

Species of moth

Onychipodia nigricostata is a moth of the subfamily Arctiinae. It was described by Arthur Gardiner Butler in 1894. It is found in Kenya.
