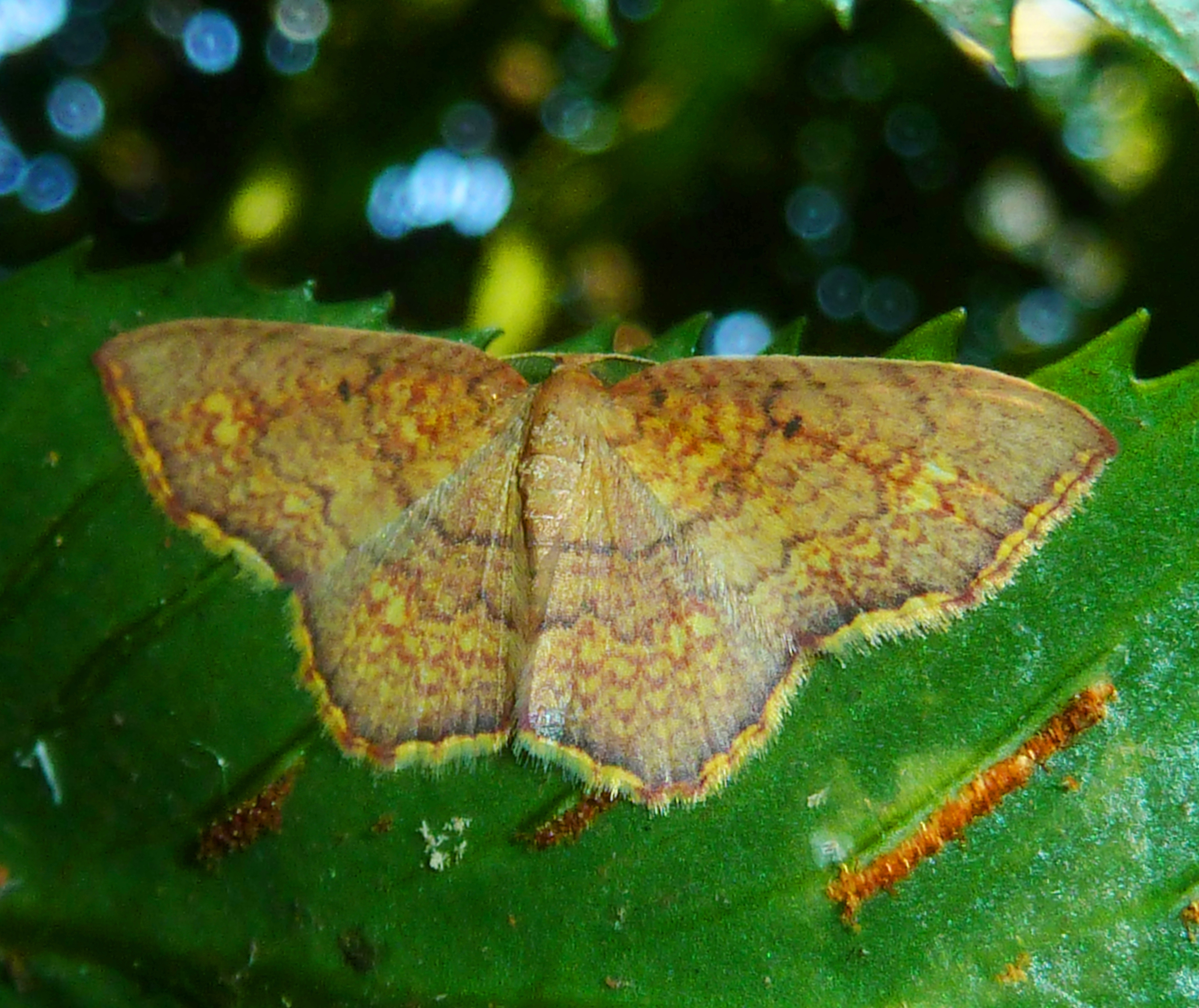
- Eois grataria ab. mediofusca

Scientific classification
- Kingdom: Animalia
- Phylum: Arthropoda
- Clade: Pancrustacea
- Class: Insecta
- Order: Lepidoptera
- Family: Geometridae
- Genus: Eois
- Species: E. grataria

Binomial name
- Eois grataria (Walker, 1861)

Synonyms
- Hyria grataria Walker, 1861; Acidalia pallicinctaria Walker, 1863; Amaurinia nubifera Thierry-Mieg, 1915; Eois grataria ab. mediofusca Prout; Eois grataria ab. marginata Warren; Eois grataria ab. perflava Warren

= Eois grataria =

Species of moth

Eois grataria is a moth in the family Geometridae. It is found in the Indian subregion, Sri Lanka, Hong Kong, Sundaland and on Christmas Island.

== Taxonomy ==
Records from Africa (ab. mediofusca) and from the Moluccas eastwards to the Bismarck Archipelago (ab. marginata and ab. perflava) are not conspecific with grataria, since the genitalia of both sexes are distinct.

== Description ==
Its wingspan is about 22–24 mm. Antennae in both sexes bipectinate (comb like on both sides) with long branches to two-thirds of their length. Hindwings with rounded outer margin. Veins 3 and 4 stalked. Body crimson, suffused with purplish fuscous, except on disk of hindwings. Both wings with numerous minutely waved lines. Some bright yellow between two of the postmedial waved lines, coming out as a prominent patch beyond the cell of forewing. Margin and cilia bright yellow intersected by crimson at the angle of each wing. Ventral side pale colored.

The larvae feed on Mallotus species.
