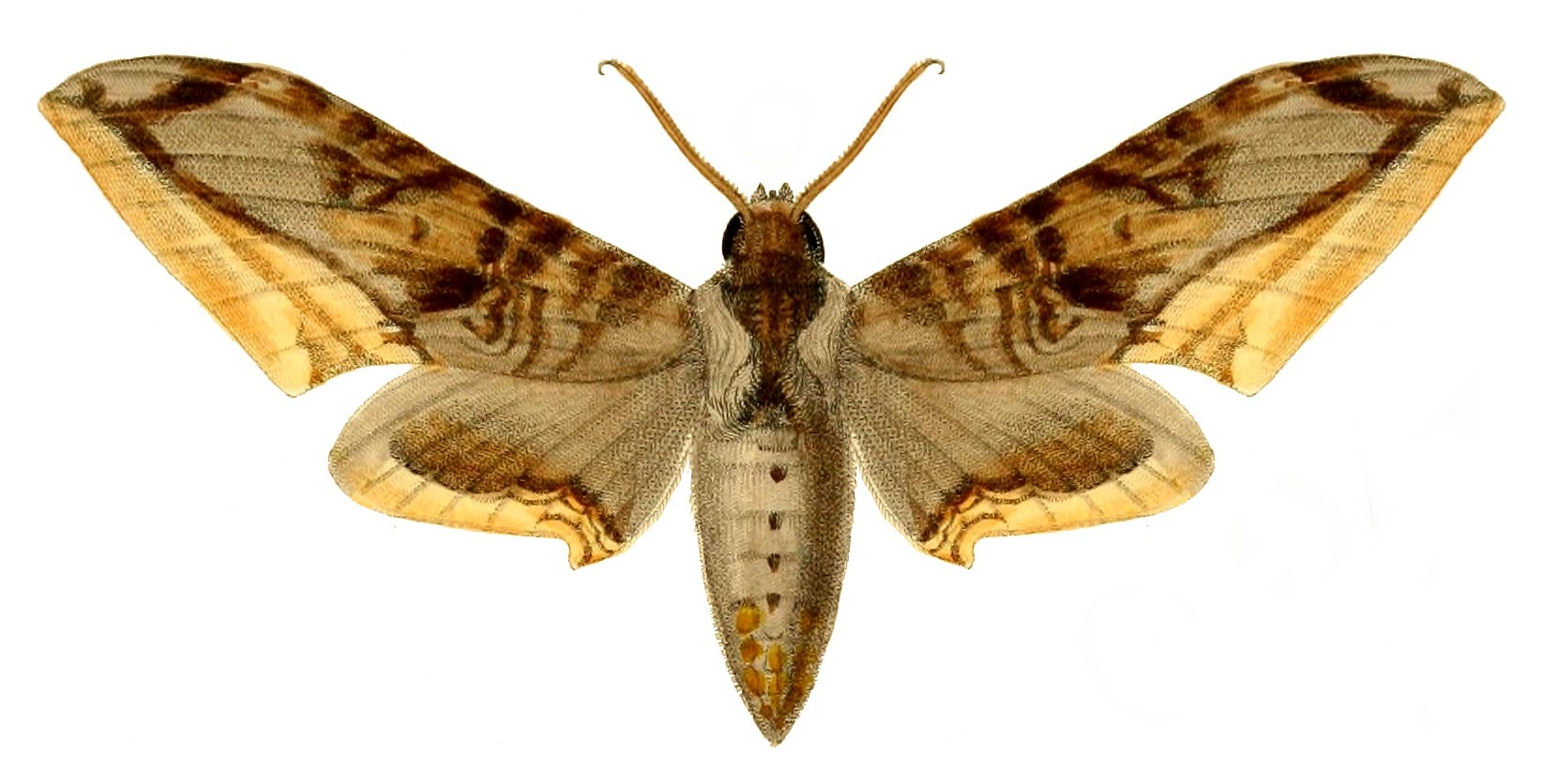
- Acanthosphinx guessfeldti

Scientific classification
- Kingdom: Animalia
- Phylum: Arthropoda
- Clade: Pancrustacea
- Class: Insecta
- Order: Lepidoptera
- Family: Sphingidae
- Tribe: Smerinthini
- Genus: Acanthosphinx; Aurivillius, 1891
- Species: A. guessfeldti

Binomial name
- Acanthosphinx guessfeldti (Dewitz, 1879)

Synonyms
- Ambulyx guessfeldti Dewitz, 1879; Acanthosphinx guessfeldti gigas Aurivillius, 1891; Acanthosphinx guessfeldti eothina Tams, 1930

= Acanthosphinx =

Genus of moths

Acanthosphinx is a monotypic genus of moth in the family Sphingidae erected by Per Olof Christopher Aurivillius in 1891. Its only species, Acanthosphinx guessfeldti, the widow sphinx, was first described by Hermann Dewitz in 1879. It is known from forests from Sierra Leone to the Congo, Angola, Zambia, Malawi, Tanzania and Uganda.

The length of each forewing is 57–70 mm.

The larvae feed on Bridelia micrantha.
