= Parafrasura =

Scientific classification
- Domain: Eukaryota
- Kingdom: Animalia
- Phylum: Arthropoda
- Class: Insecta
- Order: Lepidoptera
- Superfamily: Noctuoidea
- Family: Erebidae
- Subfamily: Arctiinae
- Tribe: Lithosiini
- Genus: Parafrasura; Durante, 2012
- Species: P. pectinella

Binomial name
- Parafrasura pectinella Strand, 1922

Synonyms
- Asura pectinata Bethune-Baker, 1911 (preocc.)

Genus of moths

Parafrasura is a monotypic moth genus in the subfamily Arctiinae described by Antonio Durante in 2012. Its only species, Parafrasura pectinella, was first described by Embrik Strand in 1922. It is known from Angola, Chad, the Democratic Republic of the Congo and Cameroon.
