= Scopula sinnaria =

Scientific classification
- Domain: Eukaryota
- Kingdom: Animalia
- Phylum: Arthropoda
- Class: Insecta
- Order: Lepidoptera
- Family: Geometridae
- Genus: Scopula
- Species: S. sinnaria

Binomial name
- Scopula sinnaria (C. Swinhoe, 1904)

Synonyms
- Emmiltis sinnaria C. Swinhoe, 1904; Emmiltis bisinuata Warren, 1905; Scopula sinuaria Janse, 1935 (misspelling)

Species of geometer moth in subfamily Sterrhinae

Scopula sinnaria is a moth of the family Geometridae first described by Charles Swinhoe in 1904. It is found in Angola, Kenya, Lesotho, Malawi, South Africa and Zimbabwe.

== Subspecies ==
- Scopula sinnaria sinnaria (South Africa)
- Scopula sinnaria bisinuata (Warren, 1905) (Angola)
