= Onychipodia flavithorax =

Scientific classification
- Domain: Eukaryota
- Kingdom: Animalia
- Phylum: Arthropoda
- Class: Insecta
- Order: Lepidoptera
- Superfamily: Noctuoidea
- Family: Erebidae
- Subfamily: Arctiinae
- Genus: Onychipodia
- Species: O. flavithorax

Binomial name
- Onychipodia flavithorax Rothschild, 1912

Species of moth

Onychipodia flavithorax is a moth of the subfamily Arctiinae. It was described by Rothschild in 1912. It is found in Angola.
