= Nyctaegeria =

Scientific classification
- Kingdom: Animalia
- Phylum: Arthropoda
- Class: Insecta
- Order: Lepidoptera
- Family: Sesiidae
- Genus: Nyctaegeria; Le Cerf, 1914
- Species: N. nobilis

Binomial name
- Nyctaegeria nobilis (H. Druce, 1910)

Synonyms
- Aegeria nobilis H. Druce, 1910; Euhagena nobilis; Nyctaegeria rohani Le Cerf 1914

Genus of moths

Nyctaegeria is a monotypic moth genus in the family Sesiidae erected by Ferdinand Le Cerf in 1914. Its only species, Nyctaegeria nobilis, was first described by Herbert Druce in 1910. It exists in Angola and Tanzania.
