= Parasiopsis =

Scientific classification
- Domain: Eukaryota
- Kingdom: Animalia
- Phylum: Arthropoda
- Class: Insecta
- Order: Lepidoptera
- Superfamily: Noctuoidea
- Family: Erebidae
- Subfamily: Hypeninae
- Genus: Parasiopsis; Bethune-Baker, 1911
- Species: P. arcuata

Binomial name
- Parasiopsis arcuata Bethune-Baker, 1911

Genus of moths

Parasiopsis is a monotypic moth genus of the family Erebidae. Its only species, Parasiopsis arcuata, is found in Angola. Both the genus and the species were first described by George Thomas Bethune-Baker in 1911.
