= Ischnarctia oberthueri =

Scientific classification
- Domain: Eukaryota
- Kingdom: Animalia
- Phylum: Arthropoda
- Class: Insecta
- Order: Lepidoptera
- Superfamily: Noctuoidea
- Family: Erebidae
- Subfamily: Arctiinae
- Genus: Ischnarctia
- Species: I. oberthueri

Binomial name
- Ischnarctia oberthueri (Rothschild, 1910)

Synonyms
- Epimedia oberthueri Rothschild, 1910; Secusio oberthuri Hampson, 1920

Species of moth

Ischnarctia oberthueri is a moth of the subfamily Arctiinae. It is found in Angola.
