= Eilema triplaiola =

Scientific classification
- Kingdom: Animalia
- Phylum: Arthropoda
- Class: Insecta
- Order: Lepidoptera
- Superfamily: Noctuoidea
- Family: Erebidae
- Subfamily: Arctiinae
- Genus: Eilema
- Species: E. triplaiola

Binomial name
- Eilema triplaiola (Bethune-Baker, 1911)

Synonyms
- Ilema triplaiola Bethune-Baker, 1911; Ilema malanga Bethune-Baker, 1911; Ilema unistrigata Bethune-Baker, 1911; Ilema bisticta Bethune-Baker, 1911

Species of moth

Eilema triplaiola is a moth of the subfamily Arctiinae. It is found in Angola and the Democratic Republic of Congo.
