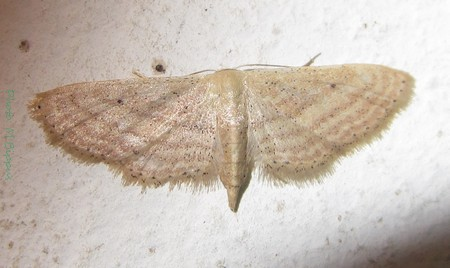

Scientific classification
- Kingdom: Animalia
- Phylum: Arthropoda
- Clade: Pancrustacea
- Class: Insecta
- Order: Lepidoptera
- Family: Geometridae
- Genus: Scopula
- Species: S. serena

Binomial name
- Scopula serena Prout, 1920

= Scopula serena =

Species of geometer moth in subfamily Sterrhinae

Scopula serena is a moth of the family Geometridae. It is found in Africa south of the Sahara, from Sierra Leone to Tanzania and to South Africa, as well as on the Indian Ocean islands

The wingspan is 14–17 mm.
