= Scopula sanguinisecta =

Scientific classification
- Domain: Eukaryota
- Kingdom: Animalia
- Phylum: Arthropoda
- Class: Insecta
- Order: Lepidoptera
- Family: Geometridae
- Genus: Scopula
- Species: S. sanguinisecta

Binomial name
- Scopula sanguinisecta (Warren, 1897)

Synonyms
- Craspedia sanguinisecta Warren, 1897; Craspedia muscosaria Warren, 1902

Species of geometer moth in subfamily Sterrhinae

Scopula sanguinisecta is a moth of the family Geometridae. It is found in Angola, Kenya, Madagascar and South Africa.

== Subspecies ==
- Scopula sanguinisecta sanguinisecta (Kenya, South Africa)
- Scopula sanguinisecta subcatenata Prout, 1932 (Madagascar)
