= Stenarctia abdominalis =

Scientific classification
- Domain: Eukaryota
- Kingdom: Animalia
- Phylum: Arthropoda
- Class: Insecta
- Order: Lepidoptera
- Superfamily: Noctuoidea
- Family: Erebidae
- Subfamily: Arctiinae
- Genus: Stenarctia
- Species: S. abdominalis

Binomial name
- Stenarctia abdominalis Rothschild, 1910

Species of moth

Stenarctia abdominalis is a moth of the subfamily Arctiinae first described by Rothschild in 1910. It is found in Angola, Cameroon, Kenya, Sierra Leone and Uganda.
