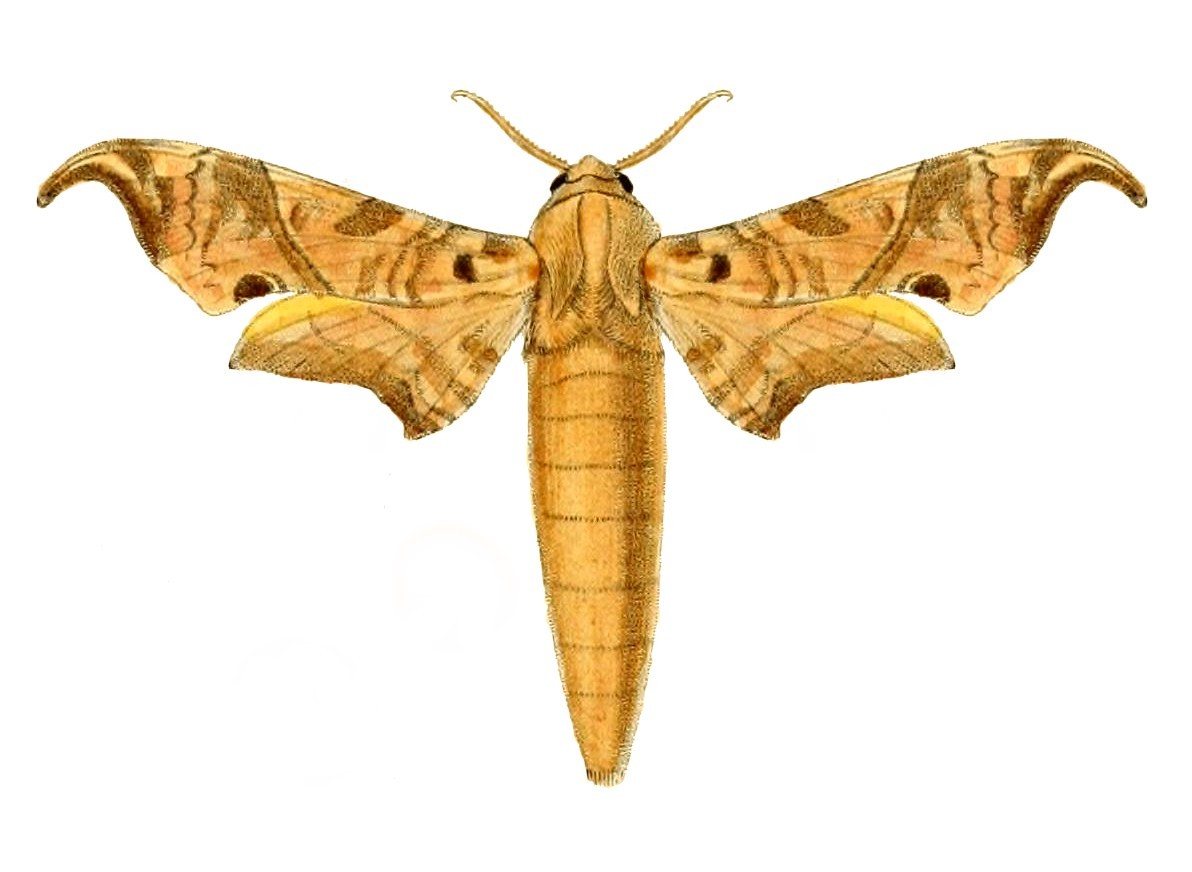

Scientific classification
- Kingdom: Animalia
- Phylum: Arthropoda
- Class: Insecta
- Order: Lepidoptera
- Family: Sphingidae
- Tribe: Smerinthini
- Genus: Lycosphingia; Rothschild & Jordan, 1903
- Species: L. hamatus

Binomial name
- Lycosphingia hamatus (Dewitz, 1879)

Synonyms
- Smerinthus hamatus Walker, 1869

= Lycosphingia =

Genus of moths

Lycosphingia is a genus of moths in the family Sphingidae containing only one species, Lycosphingia hamatus. It is known from forests from Liberia and Ghana to Angola, the Congo and Uganda.

The length of the forewings is 29–31 mm.
