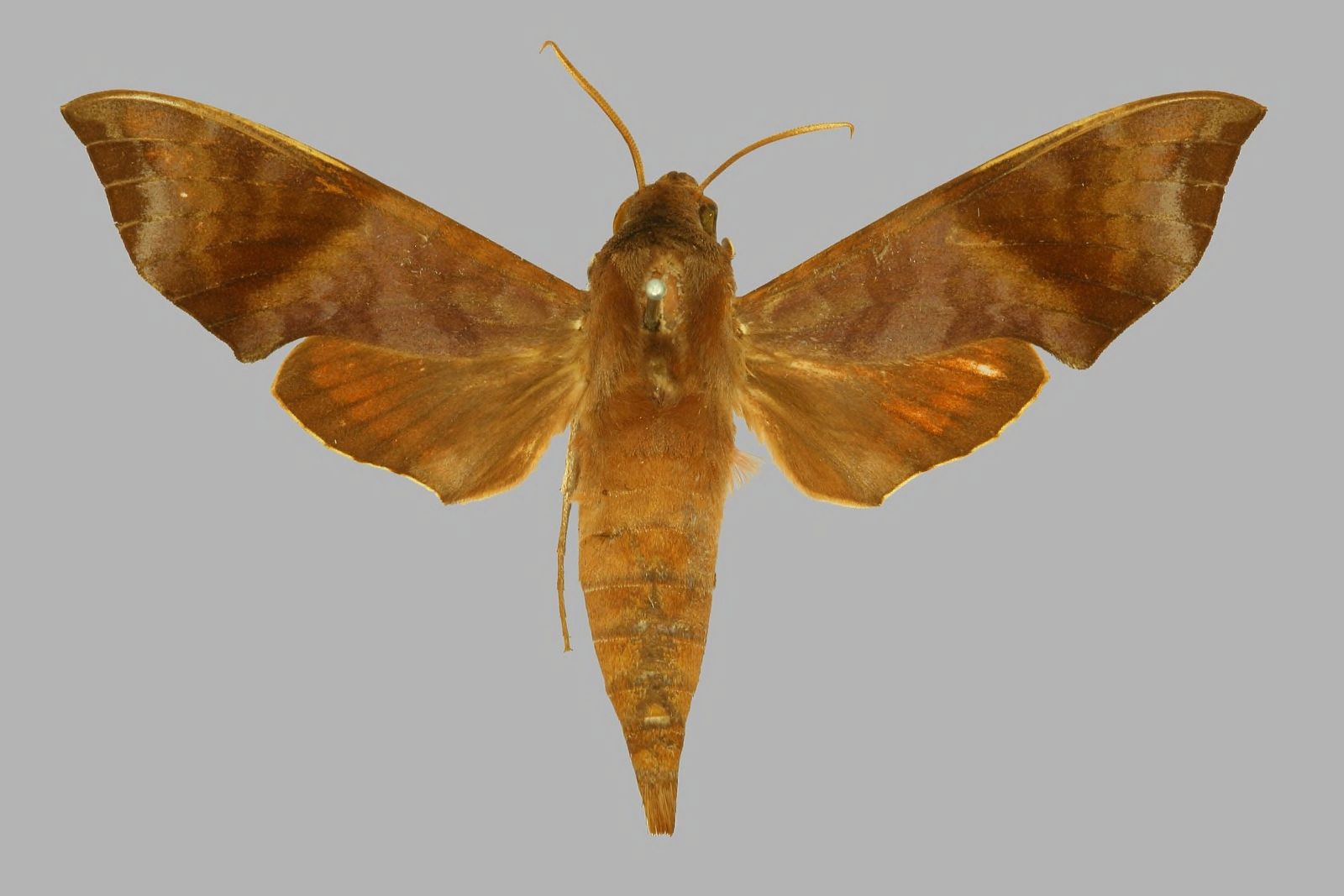
- Upper side view of a male Temnora funebris

Scientific classification
- Kingdom: Animalia
- Phylum: Arthropoda
- Class: Insecta
- Order: Lepidoptera
- Family: Sphingidae
- Genus: Temnora
- Species: T. funebris

Binomial name
- Temnora funebris (Holland, 1893)

Synonyms
- Diodosida funebris Holland, 1893; Polyptychus vumbui Stevenson, 1938

= Temnora funebris =

Species of moth

Temnora funebris is a moth of the family Sphingidae first described by William Jacob Holland in 1893. It is known from the forests of western Africa to the Democratic Republic of the Congo, Uganda, Tanzania and Zimbabwe.

The length of the forewings is 23–29 mm.
