= Scopula fimbrilineata =

Scientific classification
- Domain: Eukaryota
- Kingdom: Animalia
- Phylum: Arthropoda
- Class: Insecta
- Order: Lepidoptera
- Family: Geometridae
- Genus: Scopula
- Species: S. fimbrilineata

Binomial name
- Scopula fimbrilineata (Warren, 1902)

Synonyms
- Craspedia fimbrilineata Warren, 1902; Idaea niobe Fawcett, 1916; Craspedia protuberans Warren, 1909; Craspedia immaculata Warren, 1905

Species of geometer moth in subfamily Sterrhinae

Scopula fimbrilineata is a moth of the family Geometridae. It was described by Warren in 1902. It is found in Angola, Ivory Coast, Kenya, Malawi and South Africa.

== Subspecies ==
- Scopula fimbrilineata fimbrilineata (South Africa)
- Scopula fimbrilineata immaculata (Warren, 1905) (Ivory Coast)
