= Eilema minutissima =

Scientific classification
- Kingdom: Animalia
- Phylum: Arthropoda
- Class: Insecta
- Order: Lepidoptera
- Superfamily: Noctuoidea
- Family: Erebidae
- Subfamily: Arctiinae
- Genus: Eilema
- Species: E. minutissima

Binomial name
- Eilema minutissima (Bethune-Baker, 1911)

Synonyms
- Ilema minutissima Bethune-Baker, 1911

Species of moth

Eilema minutissima is a moth of the subfamily Arctiinae. It was described by George Thomas Bethune-Baker in 1911. It is found in Angola, Nigeria and South Africa.
