= Afrospilarctia flavidus =

Scientific classification
- Domain: Eukaryota
- Kingdom: Animalia
- Phylum: Arthropoda
- Class: Insecta
- Order: Lepidoptera
- Superfamily: Noctuoidea
- Family: Erebidae
- Subfamily: Arctiinae
- Genus: Afrospilarctia
- Species: A. flavidus

Binomial name
- Afrospilarctia flavidus (Bartel, 1903)

Synonyms
- Creatonotus flavidus Bartel, 1903

Species of moth

Afrospilarctia flavidus is a moth of the family Erebidae. It was described by Max Bartel in 1903. It is found in Angola, Namibia, Nigeria and South Africa.
