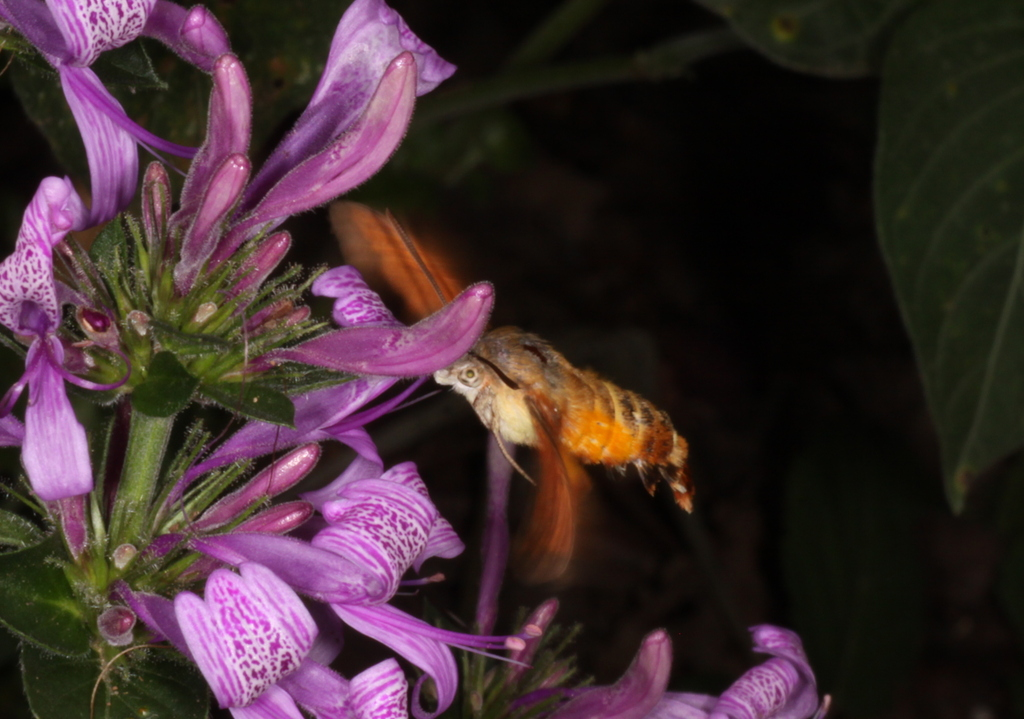

Scientific classification
- Kingdom: Animalia
- Phylum: Arthropoda
- Class: Insecta
- Order: Lepidoptera
- Family: Sphingidae
- Genus: Macroglossum
- Species: M. trochilus

Binomial name
- Macroglossum trochilus (Hübner, 1823)

Synonyms
- Psithyros trochilus Hübner, 1823; Macroglossa trochilioides Butler, 1875; Macroglossa lysithous Boisduval, 1875; Rhamphoschisma fasciatum Wallengren, 1858

= Macroglossum trochilus =

African hummingbird hawk-moth

Species of moth

Macroglossum trochilus, the African hummingbird hawk-moth, is a moth of the family Sphingidae. The species was first described by Jacob Hübner in 1823. It is very common in most habitats throughout southern and eastern Africa and in the Comoro Islands.

Adults are frequently seen at flowers in full sunshine.

The length of the forewings is 15–18 mm.

The tail of the pupa moves when the pupa is disturbed or possibly in harm's way.
