= Chaetostephana rendalli =

Scientific classification
- Domain: Eukaryota
- Kingdom: Animalia
- Phylum: Arthropoda
- Class: Insecta
- Order: Lepidoptera
- Superfamily: Noctuoidea
- Family: Noctuidae
- Genus: Chaetostephana
- Species: C. rendalli

Binomial name
- Chaetostephana rendalli (Rothschild, 1896)

Synonyms
- Metagarista rendalli Rothschild, 1896; Chaetostephana angolana Jordan, 1913

Species of moth

Chaetostephana rendalli is a moth of the family Noctuidae. It is found in Angola, the Democratic Republic of Congo, Malawi, Tanzania and Zambia.
