= Scopula crassipuncta =

Scientific classification
- Kingdom: Animalia
- Phylum: Arthropoda
- Clade: Pancrustacea
- Class: Insecta
- Order: Lepidoptera
- Family: Geometridae
- Genus: Scopula
- Species: S. crassipuncta

Binomial name
- Scopula crassipuncta (Warren, 1901)

Synonyms
- Craspedia crassipuncta Warren, 1901

Species of geometer moth in subfamily Sterrhinae

Scopula crassipuncta is a moth of the family Geometridae. It was discovered by Warren in 1901. It is endemic to Angola.
