= Ischnarctia brunnescens =

Scientific classification
- Kingdom: Animalia
- Phylum: Arthropoda
- Class: Insecta
- Order: Lepidoptera
- Superfamily: Noctuoidea
- Family: Erebidae
- Subfamily: Arctiinae
- Genus: Ischnarctia
- Species: I. brunnescens

Binomial name
- Ischnarctia brunnescens Bartel, 1903

Species of moth

Ischnarctia brunnescens is a moth of the subfamily Arctiinae. It is found in Angola, the Democratic Republic of Congo, Malawi and Tanzania. The Ischnarctia genus was described by Max Bartel in 1903.
