= Scopula penricei =

Scientific classification
- Kingdom: Animalia
- Phylum: Arthropoda
- Class: Insecta
- Order: Lepidoptera
- Family: Geometridae
- Genus: Scopula
- Species: S. penricei

Binomial name
- Scopula penricei Prout, 1920

Species of geometer moth in subfamily Sterrhinae

Scopula penricei is a moth of the family Geometridae. It is found in Angola and Zimbabwe.

The wingspan is 30 mm (1.2 in) for the holotype (male) and 28 mm (1.1 in) for the allotype (female).
