= Afrotheora jordani =

Scientific classification
- Kingdom: Animalia
- Phylum: Arthropoda
- Class: Insecta
- Order: Lepidoptera
- Family: Hepialidae
- Genus: Afrotheora
- Species: A. jordani

Binomial name
- Afrotheora jordani (Viette, 1956)

Synonyms
- Eudalaca jordani Viette, 1956

Species of moth

Afrotheora jordani is a species of moth of the family Hepialidae. It is known from Angola.
