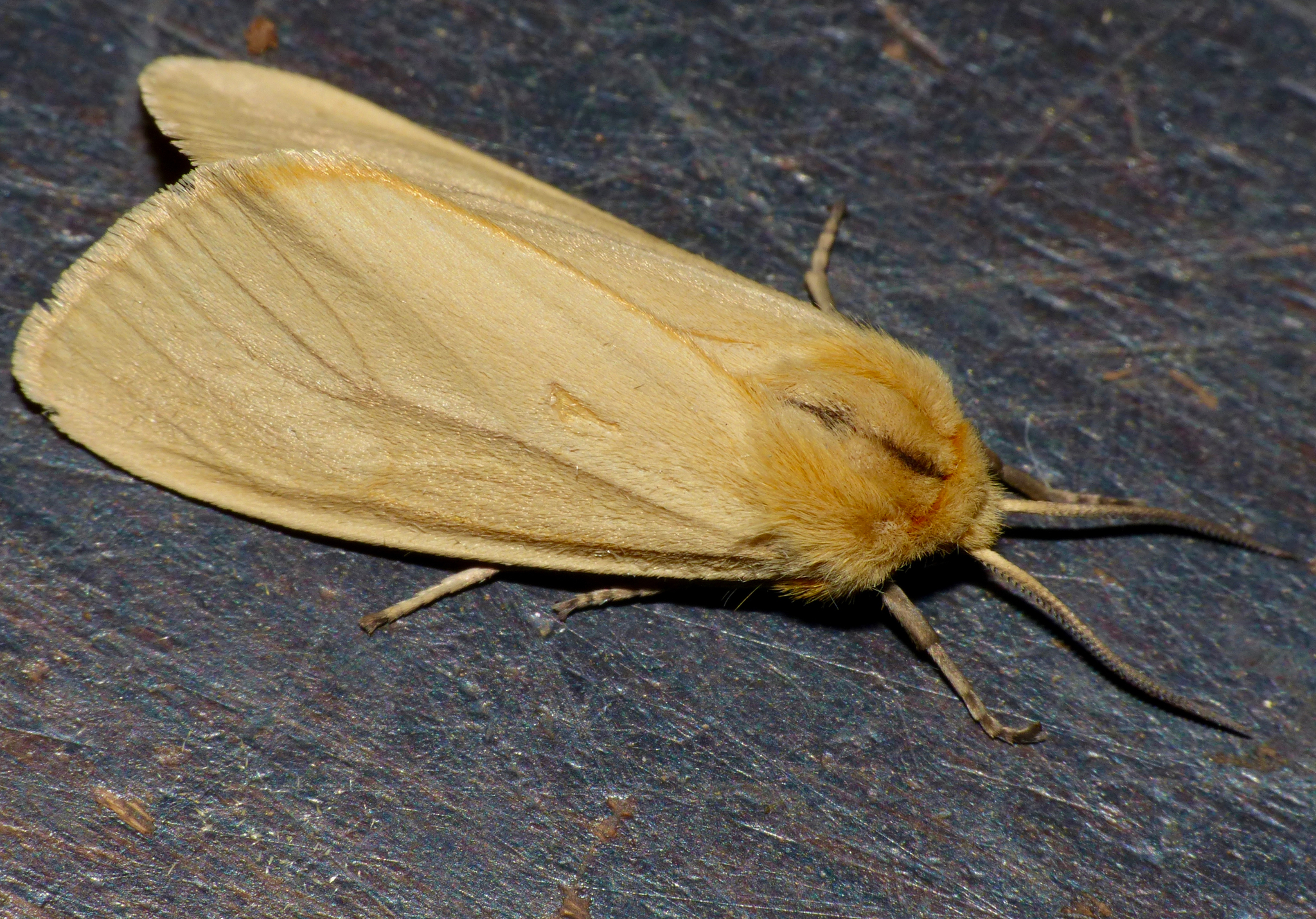
- Adult
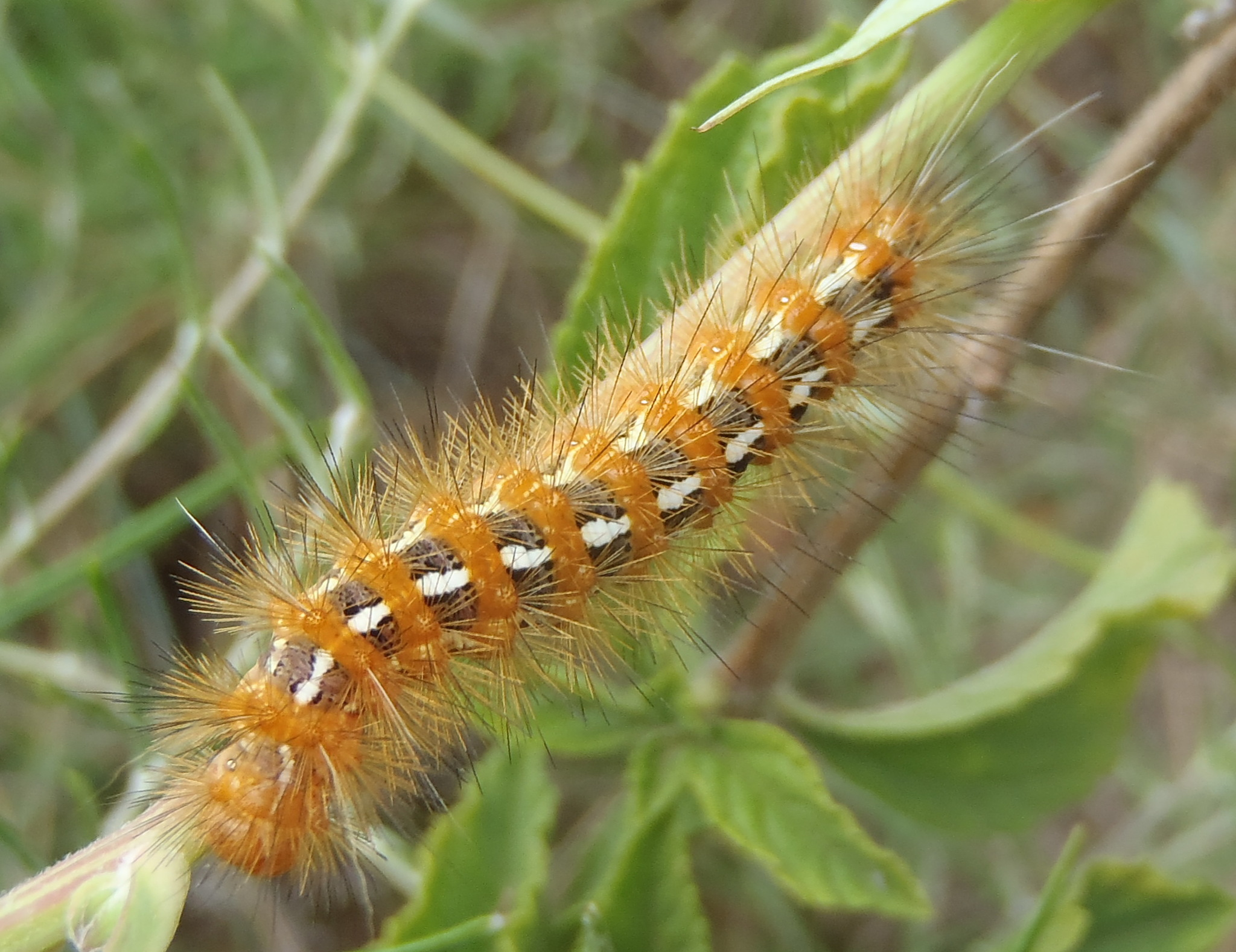
- Larva

Scientific classification
- Kingdom: Animalia
- Phylum: Arthropoda
- Class: Insecta
- Order: Lepidoptera
- Superfamily: Noctuoidea
- Family: Erebidae
- Subfamily: Arctiinae
- Genus: Saenura; Wallengren, 1858
- Species: S. flava

Binomial name
- Saenura flava Wallengren, 1858

Synonyms
- Diacrisia oriens Rothschild, 1917

= Saenura =

Saenura flava

Genus of moths

Saenura is a genus of moth in the subfamily Arctiinae. It contains only one species, Saenura flava, which can be found in southern Africa. It is sometimes known as the yellow ermine.

The larvae feed on Tagetes erecta, Senecio species, Cassia occidentalis, Cassia tomentosa, Tephrosia species, Acacia mearnsii, Ornithogalium eckloni, Protea multibracteata, Rubus pinnotus, Smilax species and Lantana species.
