= Nacliodes =

Scientific classification
- Domain: Eukaryota
- Kingdom: Animalia
- Phylum: Arthropoda
- Class: Insecta
- Order: Lepidoptera
- Superfamily: Noctuoidea
- Family: Erebidae
- Subfamily: Arctiinae
- Genus: Nacliodes; Strand, 1912
- Species: N. microsippia

Binomial name
- Nacliodes microsippia (Strand, 1912)

Synonyms
- Mesonaclia Kiriakoff, 1953; Meganaclia microsippia Strand, 1912; Meganaclia minor Hampson, 1914

Genus of moths

Nacliodes is a genus of moths in the family Erebidae. It contains the single species Nacliodes microsippia, which is found in Angola, Cameroon, the Democratic Republic of Congo, Equatorial Guinea and Uganda.
