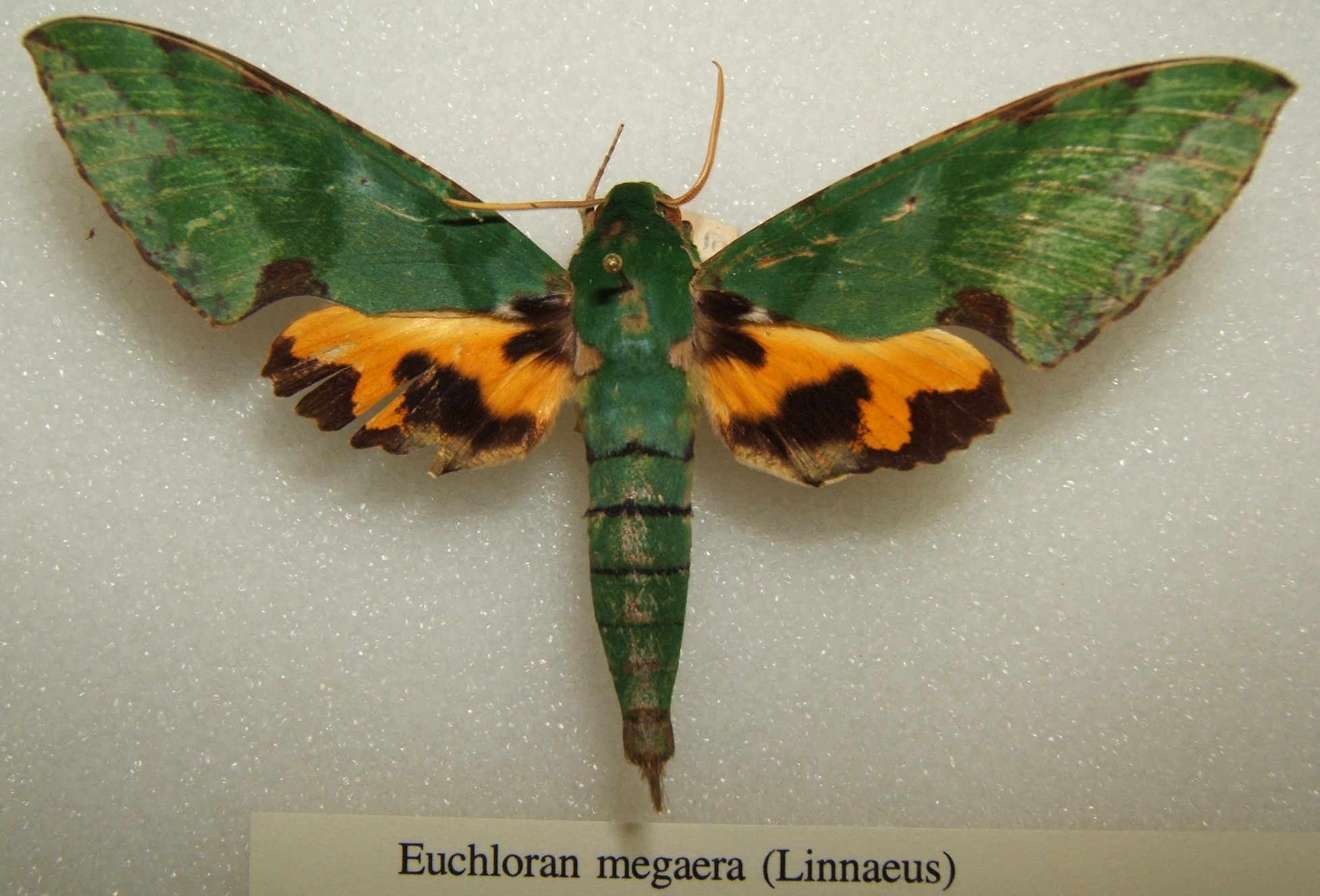

Scientific classification
- Kingdom: Animalia
- Phylum: Arthropoda
- Class: Insecta
- Order: Lepidoptera
- Family: Sphingidae
- Genus: Euchloron; Boisduval, 1875
- Species: E. megaera

Binomial name
- Euchloron megaera (Linnaeus, 1758)

Synonyms
- Generic; Chlorina Guenée, 1862; Specific; Sphinx megaera Linnaeus, 1758; Euchloron megaera cadioui Saldaitis & Ivinskis, 2010; Deilephila megaera lacordairei Boisduval, 1833

= Euchloron =

Euchloron megaera

Genus of moths

Euchloron is a monotypic moth genus of the family Sphingidae first described by Jean Baptiste Boisduval in 1875. Its only species, Euchloron megaera, the verdant hawk, is known from most of Africa and Yemen. It is a migratory species.

The length of the forewings is 40–50 mm and the wingspan is 96–121 mm.

The larvae feed on Ampelopsis quinquefolia, Vigna and Cissus species.

== Subspecies ==
- Euchloron megaera megaera (very common and widely distributed in most habitats in most of Africa south of the Sahara, and Grand Comore, except high mountains and very arid areas. It is also not found in the western Cape)
- Euchloron megaera asiatica Haxaire & Melichar, 2009 (Yemen)
- Euchloron megaera lacordairei (Boisduval, 1833) (Madagascar, Mayotte, Mohéli and Anjouan)
- Euchloron megaera orhanti Haxaire, 2010 (Réunion)
- Euchloron megaera serrai Darge, 1970 (São Tomé)
