= Cheligium lineatum =

Scientific classification
- Kingdom: Animalia
- Phylum: Arthropoda
- Clade: Pancrustacea
- Class: Insecta
- Order: Lepidoptera
- Family: Lasiocampidae
- Genus: Cheligium
- Species: C. lineatum

Binomial name
- Cheligium lineatum (Aurivillius, 1893)

Synonyms
- Taragama lineatum Aurivillius, 1893; Pachypasa dallana Bethune-Baker, 1927; Taragama pulchristriata Bethune-Baker, 1911

Species of moth

Cheligium lineatum is a moth in the family Lasiocampidae. It was described by Per Olof Christopher Aurivillius in 1893. It is found in Angola, Cameroon, Gabon, Nigeria and Sierra Leone.

The wingspan is about 110 mm. Both wings are palish brown, the forewings with a curved, longitudinal paler stripe from the base below the cell to the costa almost into the apex. The hindwings are uniform and slightly darker than the forewings.
