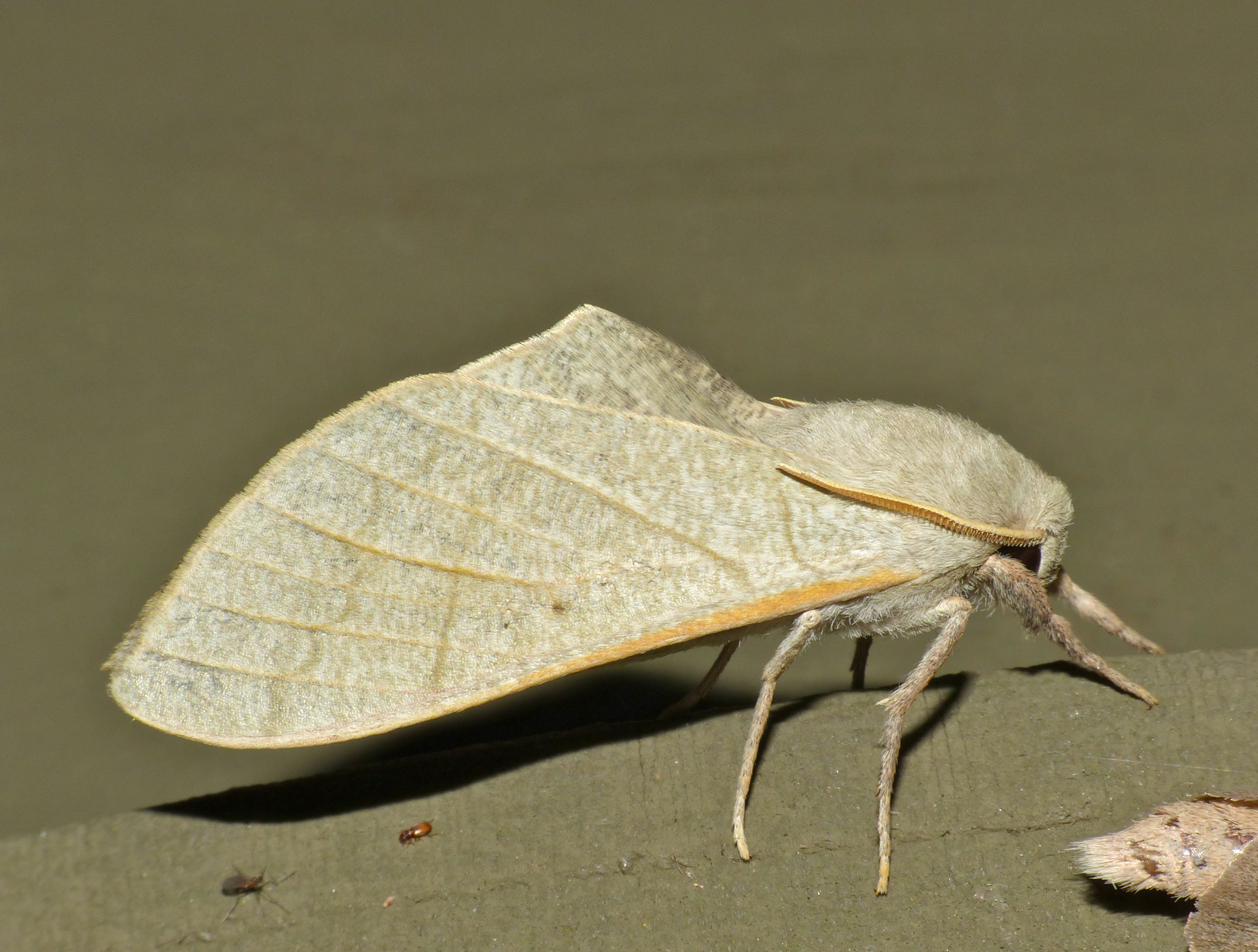

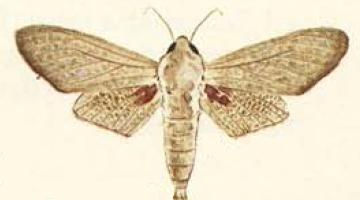

Scientific classification
- Domain: Eukaryota
- Kingdom: Animalia
- Phylum: Arthropoda
- Class: Insecta
- Order: Lepidoptera
- Family: Sphingidae
- Tribe: Smerinthini
- Genus: Neoclanis; Carcasson, 1968
- Species: N. basalis

Binomial name
- Neoclanis basalis (Walker, 1866)

Synonyms
- Smerinthus basalis Walker, 1866; Choerocampa virgo Westwood, 1881

= Neoclanis =

Genus of moths

Neoclanis is a genus of moths in the family Sphingidae, containing one species, Neoclanis basalis, which is known from dry bush and woodland from Zimbabwe and Angola to Zambia, Tanzania and eastern Kenya.
