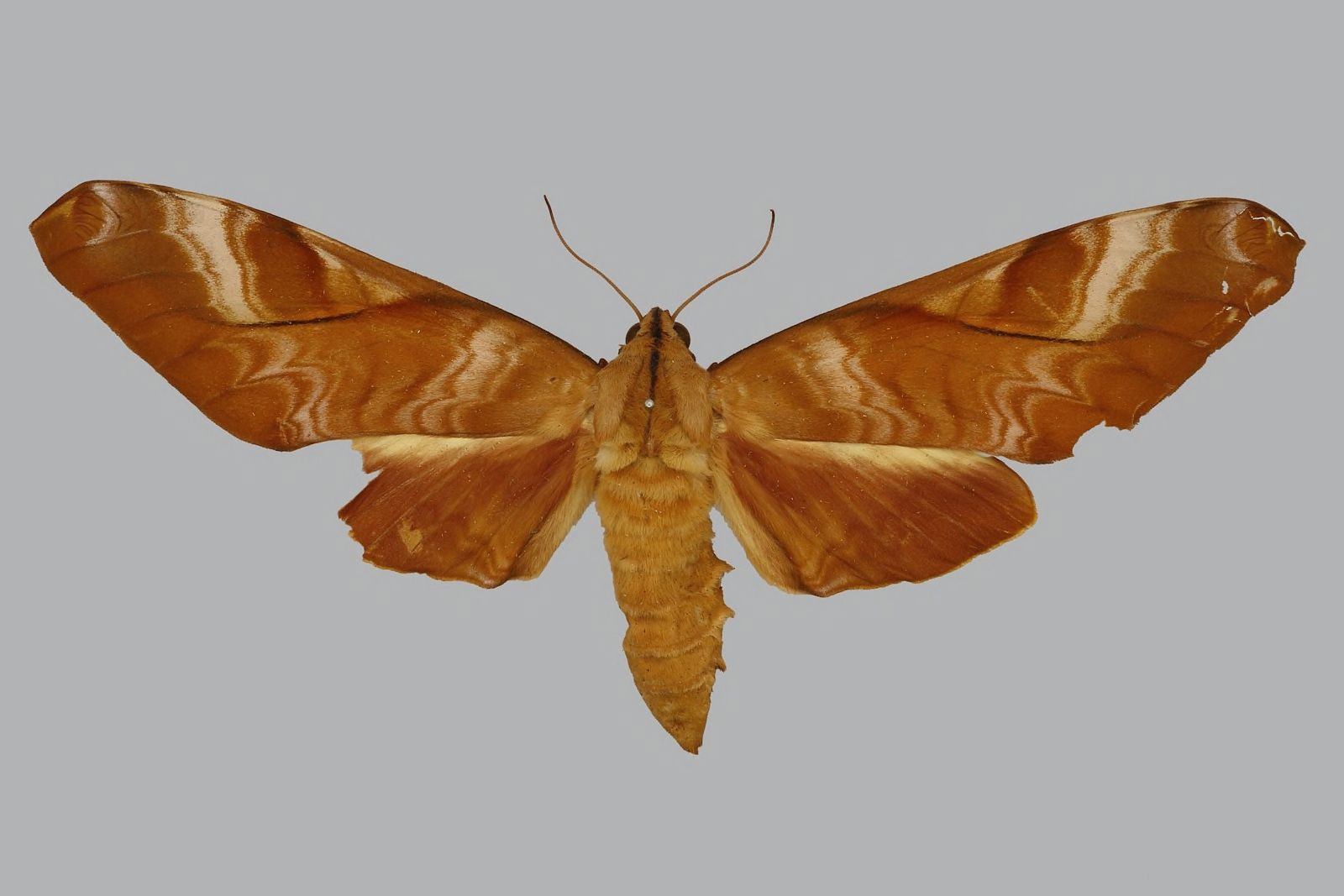
- Rhadinopasa hornimani hornimani

Scientific classification
- Kingdom: Animalia
- Phylum: Arthropoda
- Clade: Pancrustacea
- Class: Insecta
- Order: Lepidoptera
- Family: Sphingidae
- Tribe: Smerinthini
- Genus: Rhadinopasa; Karsch, 1891
- Species: R. hornimani

Binomial name
- Rhadinopasa hornimani (H. Druce, 1880)

Synonyms
- Basiana hornimani H. Druce, 1880; Rhadinopasa udei Karsch, 1891

= Rhadinopasa =

Genus of moths

Rhadinopasa is a monotypic genus of moth in the family Sphingidae erected by Ferdinand Karsch in 1891. Its only species, Rhadinopasa hornimani, was first described by Herbert Druce in 1880. It is known from lowland forest from Gabon, Cameroon and the Central African Republic to the Democratic Republic of the Congo to Uganda and Tanzania.

== Species ==
- Rhadinopasa hornimani hornimani
- Rhadinopasa hornimani tanganyikae Clark, 1938 (Tanzania)
