= Scopula sincera =

Scientific classification
- Kingdom: Animalia
- Phylum: Arthropoda
- Class: Insecta
- Order: Lepidoptera
- Family: Geometridae
- Genus: Scopula
- Species: S. sincera

Binomial name
- Scopula sincera (Warren, 1901)

Synonyms
- Craspedia sincera Warren, 1901

Species of geometer moth in subfamily Sterrhinae

Scopula sincera is a moth of the family Geometridae. It is found in Angola, Malawi, South Africa and Zambia.
