= Stenarctia quadripunctata =

Scientific classification
- Domain: Eukaryota
- Kingdom: Animalia
- Phylum: Arthropoda
- Class: Insecta
- Order: Lepidoptera
- Superfamily: Noctuoidea
- Family: Erebidae
- Subfamily: Arctiinae
- Genus: Stenarctia
- Species: S. quadripunctata

Binomial name
- Stenarctia quadripunctata Aurivillius, 1900

Species of moth

Stenarctia quadripunctata is a moth in the subfamily Arctiinae. It is found in Angola, Cameroon, the Democratic Republic of Congo, Gabon, Kenya and Uganda.
