= Afrospilarctia lucida =

Scientific classification
- Domain: Eukaryota
- Kingdom: Animalia
- Phylum: Arthropoda
- Class: Insecta
- Order: Lepidoptera
- Superfamily: Noctuoidea
- Family: Erebidae
- Subfamily: Arctiinae
- Genus: Afrospilarctia
- Species: A. lucida

Binomial name
- Afrospilarctia lucida (H. Druce, 1898)

Synonyms
- Euchaetes lucida H. Druce, 1898; Spilosoma steudeli Bartel, 1903

Species of moth

Afrospilarctia lucida is a moth of the family Erebidae. It was described by Herbert Druce in 1898. It is found in Angola, Ethiopia, Kenya, Rwanda, Tanzania, Uganda and Zimbabwe.
