= Scopula rubriceps =

Scientific classification
- Kingdom: Animalia
- Phylum: Arthropoda
- Class: Insecta
- Order: Lepidoptera
- Family: Geometridae
- Genus: Scopula
- Species: S. rubriceps

Binomial name
- Scopula rubriceps (Warren, 1905)

Synonyms
- Lipocentris rubriceps Warren, 1905

Species of geometer moth in subfamily Sterrhinae

Scopula rubriceps is a moth of the family Geometridae. It was described by Warren in 1905. It is endemic to Angola.
