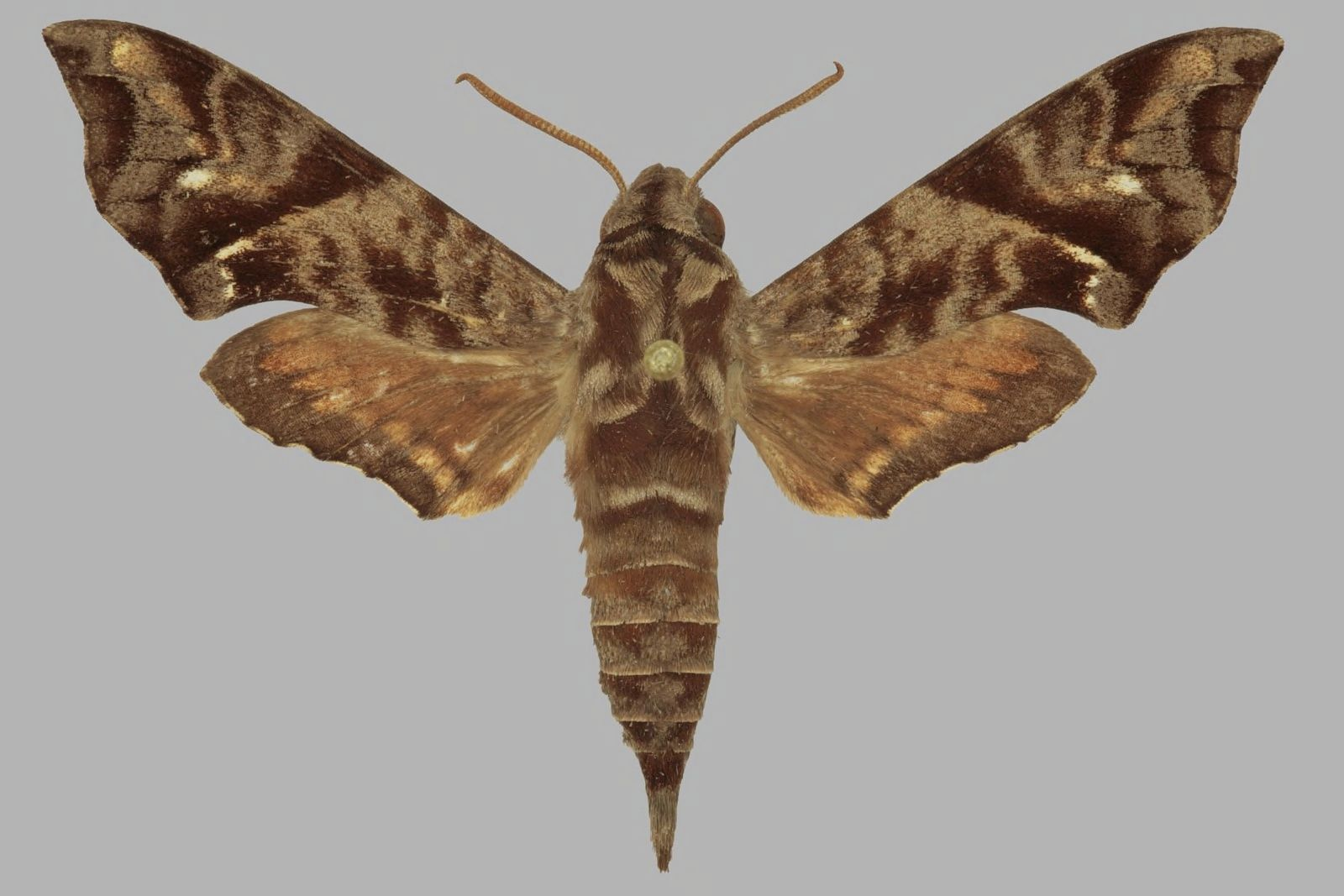
- Upper side view of a male Temnora scitula

Scientific classification
- Kingdom: Animalia
- Phylum: Arthropoda
- Class: Insecta
- Order: Lepidoptera
- Family: Sphingidae
- Genus: Temnora
- Species: T. scitula

Binomial name
- Temnora scitula (Holland, 1889)

Synonyms
- Ocyton scitula Holland, 1889

= Temnora scitula =

Species of moth

Temnora scitula is a moth of the family Sphingidae. It is known from forests from the Gambia to Congo, Angola and Uganda. There is an isolated population in eastern Tanzania.

The length of the forewings is 19–23 mm. It is immediately distinguishable from all other Temnora species by the two translucent white spots on the postmedian band, one of which is sometimes longitudinally doubled. The forewing upperside has an oblique brown band and a white translucent spot proximally of this band, followed by vestiges of one or two dots, and another white translucent spot. The hindwing upperside is orange-brown, with a paler median band and a deep brown marginal band.
