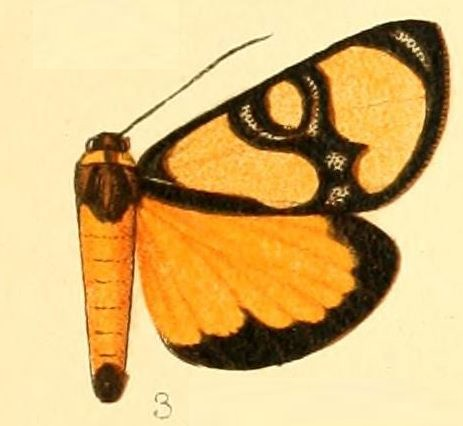

Scientific classification
- Domain: Eukaryota
- Kingdom: Animalia
- Phylum: Arthropoda
- Class: Insecta
- Order: Lepidoptera
- Superfamily: Noctuoidea
- Family: Noctuidae
- Genus: Chaetostephana
- Species: C. inclusa

Binomial name
- Chaetostephana inclusa (Karsch, 1895)

Synonyms
- Pristoceraea inclusa Karsch, 1895

= Chaetostephana inclusa =

Species of moth

Chaetostephana inclusa is a moth of the family Noctuidae. It is found in Angola, the Democratic Republic of Congo, Guinea and Malawi.
