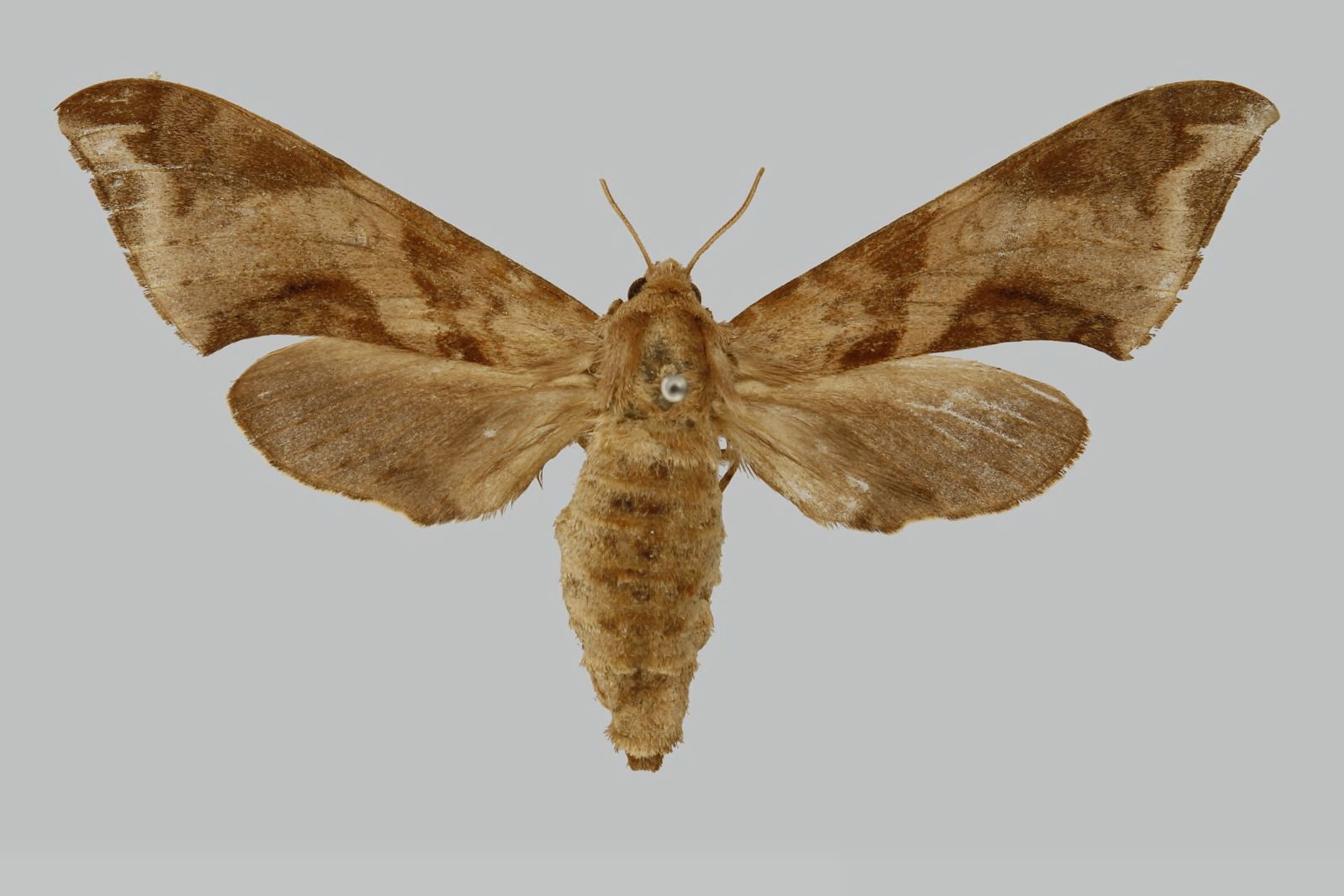
- Female

Scientific classification
- Domain: Eukaryota
- Kingdom: Animalia
- Phylum: Arthropoda
- Class: Insecta
- Order: Lepidoptera
- Family: Sphingidae
- Tribe: Smerinthini
- Genus: Chloroclanis; Carcasson, 1968
- Species: C. virescens

Binomial name
- Chloroclanis virescens (Butler, 1882)

Synonyms
- Pseudosmerinthus virescens Butler, 1882; Polyptychus olivolinea Joicey & Kaye, 1917; Polyptychus virescens ochracea Gehlen, 1951

= Chloroclanis =

Genus of moths

Chloroclanis is a genus of moths in the family Sphingidae, containing one species, Chloroclanis virescens, which is known from forest from west Africa to Angola, the Congo, Uganda and western Kenya and Tanzania.

The length of the forewings is 28–30 mm for males.

== Subspecies ==
- Chloroclanis virescens virescens
- Chloroclanis virescens ochracea (Gehlen, 1951) (Central African Republic)
- Chloroclanis virescens tanzanica Carcasson, 1968 (Tanzania)
