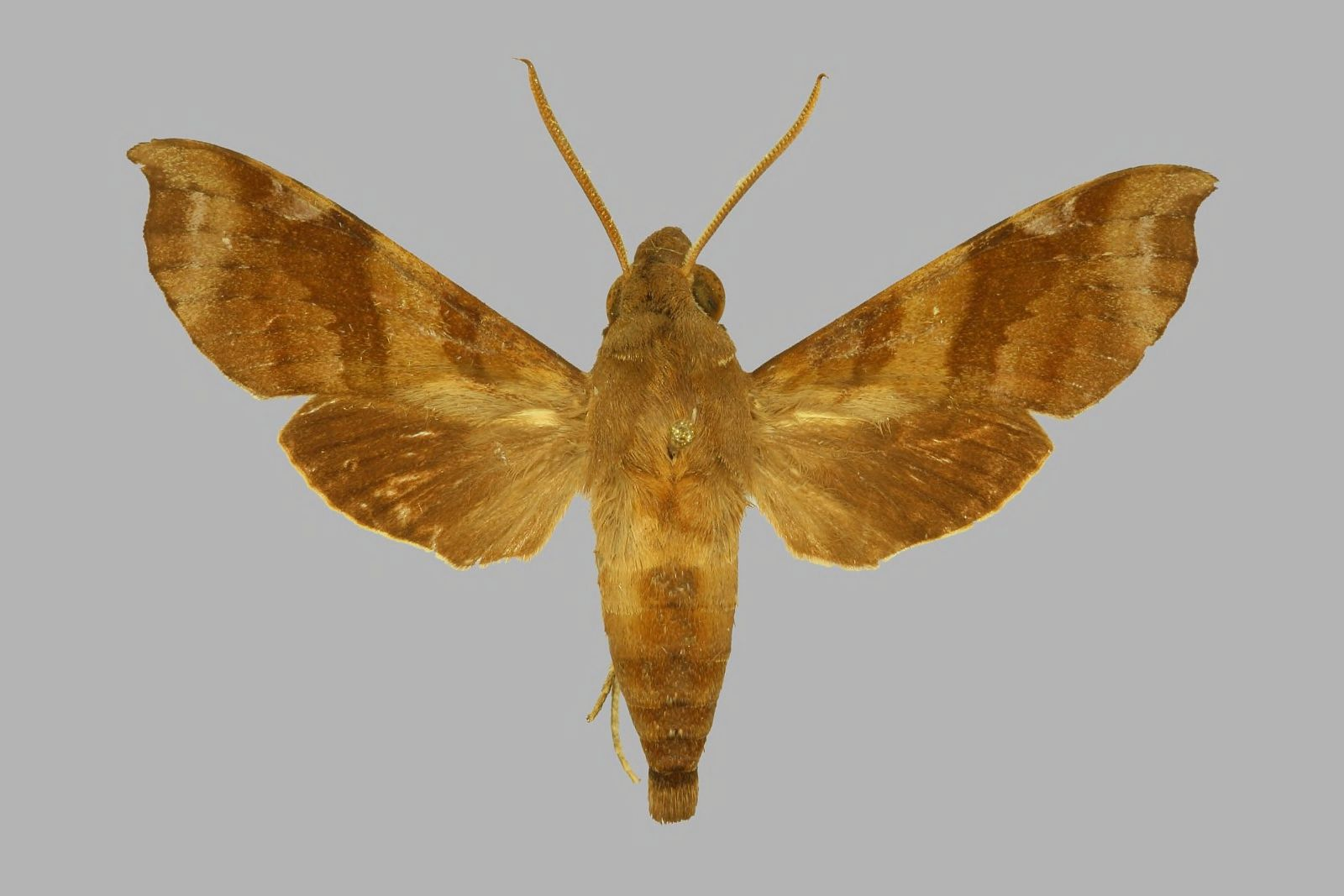

Scientific classification
- Kingdom: Animalia
- Phylum: Arthropoda
- Class: Insecta
- Order: Lepidoptera
- Family: Sphingidae
- Genus: Temnora
- Species: T. fumosa

Binomial name
- Temnora fumosa (Walker, 1856)

Synonyms
- Zonilia fumosa Walker, 1856; Nephele fallax Rothschild, 1894

= Temnora fumosa =

Species of moth

Temnora fumosa is a moth of the family Sphingidae. It is found in most habitats throughout Africa south of the Sahara.

The length of the forewings is 22–28 mm (0.87–1.10 in).

== Subspecies ==
- Temnora fumosa fumosa
- Temnora fumosa albuquerqueae Darge, 1970 (São Tomé and Príncipe)
- Temnora fumosa chanudeti Turlin, 1996 (Comoro Islands)
