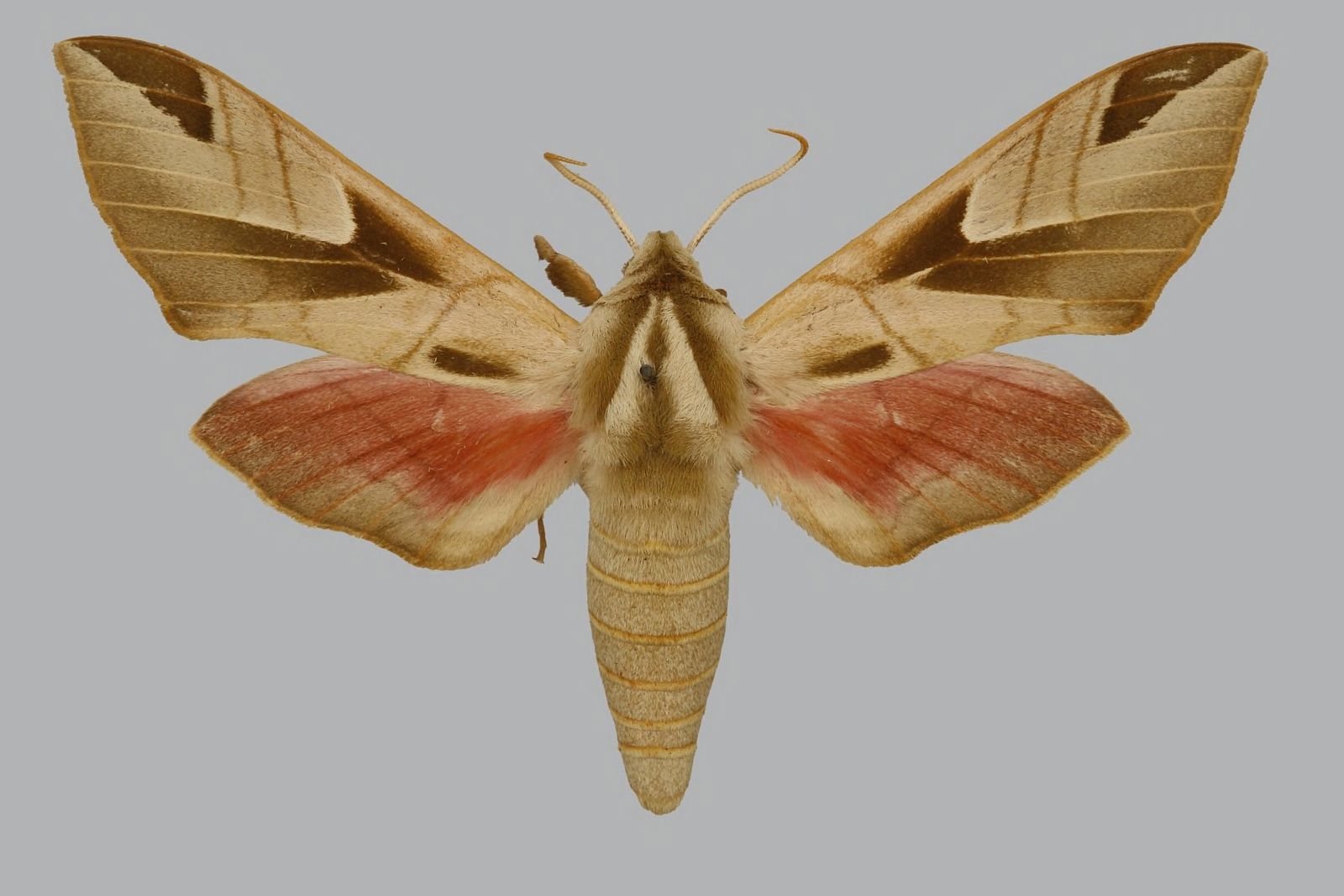

Scientific classification
- Domain: Eukaryota
- Kingdom: Animalia
- Phylum: Arthropoda
- Class: Insecta
- Order: Lepidoptera
- Family: Sphingidae
- Tribe: Smerinthini
- Genus: Leptoclanis; Rothschild & Jordan, 1903
- Species: L. pulchra

Binomial name
- Leptoclanis pulchra Rothschild & Jordan, 1903

= Leptoclanis =

Genus of moths

Leptoclanis is a genus of moths in the family Sphingidae, containing one species Leptoclanis pulchra, it is known from Brachystegia woodland from Angola and Zimbabwe to Zambia, the Democratic Republic of the Congo and southern Tanzania.

The forewings are 30–35 mm for males and about 40 mm for females. The forewings are creamy green with dark green markings. The hindwings are rosy red, bordered with green. The females are darker than the males and have broader and more rounded wings.
