= Dionychoscelis =

Scientific classification
- Kingdom: Animalia
- Phylum: Arthropoda
- Class: Insecta
- Order: Lepidoptera
- Superfamily: Noctuoidea
- Family: Erebidae
- Subfamily: Arctiinae
- Genus: Dionychoscelis; Aurivillius, 1922
- Species: D. venata

Binomial name
- Dionychoscelis venata Aurivillius, 1922

Synonyms
- Monarctia Talbot, 1929; Monarctia lactea Talbot, 1929

Genus of moths

Dionychoscelis is a monotypic genus of tiger moths in the family Erebidae. The genus includes one species, Dionychoscelis venata, which is found in Angola and the Democratic Republic of Congo.
