= Scopula variabilis =

Scientific classification
- Kingdom: Animalia
- Phylum: Arthropoda
- Class: Insecta
- Order: Lepidoptera
- Family: Geometridae
- Genus: Scopula
- Species: S. variabilis

Binomial name
- Scopula variabilis (Butler, 1878)

Synonyms
- Aletis variabilis Butler, 1878; Cartaletis variabilis; Anmenopsyche agis Druce, 1910; Anmenopsyche thestis Druce, 1910

Species of geometer moth in subfamily Sterrhinae

Scopula variabilis is a moth of the family Geometridae. It is found in Angola, Cameroon, the Democratic Republic of Congo, Kenya and Uganda.
