= Scopula lubricata =

Scientific classification
- Kingdom: Animalia
- Phylum: Arthropoda
- Class: Insecta
- Order: Lepidoptera
- Family: Geometridae
- Genus: Scopula
- Species: S. lubricata

Binomial name
- Scopula lubricata (Warren, 1905)

Synonyms
- Synelys lubricata Warren, 1905

Species of geometer moth in subfamily Sterrhinae

Scopula lubricata is a moth of the family Geometridae. It is found in Angola, the Democratic Republic of Congo, Kenya, Sierra Leone and South Africa.
