= Pachnistis morologa =

Scientific classification
- Domain: Eukaryota
- Kingdom: Animalia
- Phylum: Arthropoda
- Class: Insecta
- Order: Lepidoptera
- Family: Autostichidae
- Genus: Pachnistis
- Species: P. morologa

Binomial name
- Pachnistis morologa Meyrick, 1923

Species of moth

Pachnistis morologa is a moth in the family Autostichidae. It was described by Edward Meyrick in 1923. It is found in Angola.
