= Afrospilarctia unipuncta =

Scientific classification
- Kingdom: Animalia
- Phylum: Arthropoda
- Class: Insecta
- Order: Lepidoptera
- Superfamily: Noctuoidea
- Family: Erebidae
- Subfamily: Arctiinae
- Genus: Afrospilarctia
- Species: A. unipuncta

Binomial name
- Afrospilarctia unipuncta (Hampson, 1905)

Synonyms
- Estigmene unipuncta Hampson, 1905

Species of moth

Afrospilarctia unipuncta is a moth of the family Erebidae. It was described by George Hampson in 1905. It is found in Angola, the Democratic Republic of the Congo, Kenya, Malawi, Rwanda, Tanzania, Uganda and Zimbabwe.
