= Eupithecia celatisigna =

Scientific classification
- Domain: Eukaryota
- Kingdom: Animalia
- Phylum: Arthropoda
- Class: Insecta
- Order: Lepidoptera
- Family: Geometridae
- Genus: Eupithecia
- Species: E. celatisigna

Binomial name
- Eupithecia celatisigna (Warren, 1902)

Synonyms
- Tephroclystia celatisigna Warren, 1902; Tephroclystia lugubriaria Swinhoe, 1904

Species of moth

Eupithecia celatisigna is a moth in the family Geometridae. It is found in Angola, Cameroon, the Democratic Republic of Congo, Kenya, South Africa, Tanzania and Uganda.

== Subspecies ==
- Eupithecia celatisigna celatisigna
- Eupithecia celatisigna tatoptera Prout, 1932 (Kenya)
