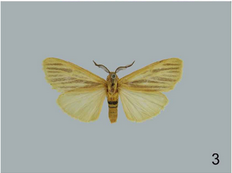

Scientific classification
- Kingdom: Animalia
- Phylum: Arthropoda
- Class: Insecta
- Order: Lepidoptera
- Superfamily: Noctuoidea
- Family: Erebidae
- Subfamily: Arctiinae
- Genus: Binna; Walker, [1865]
- Species: B. pencillata

Binomial name
- Binna pencillata Walker, [1865]

= Binna =

Genus of moths

Binna is a monotypic genus of tiger moths in the family Erebidae. It includes one species, Binna pencillata, from West Africa and Kenya.
