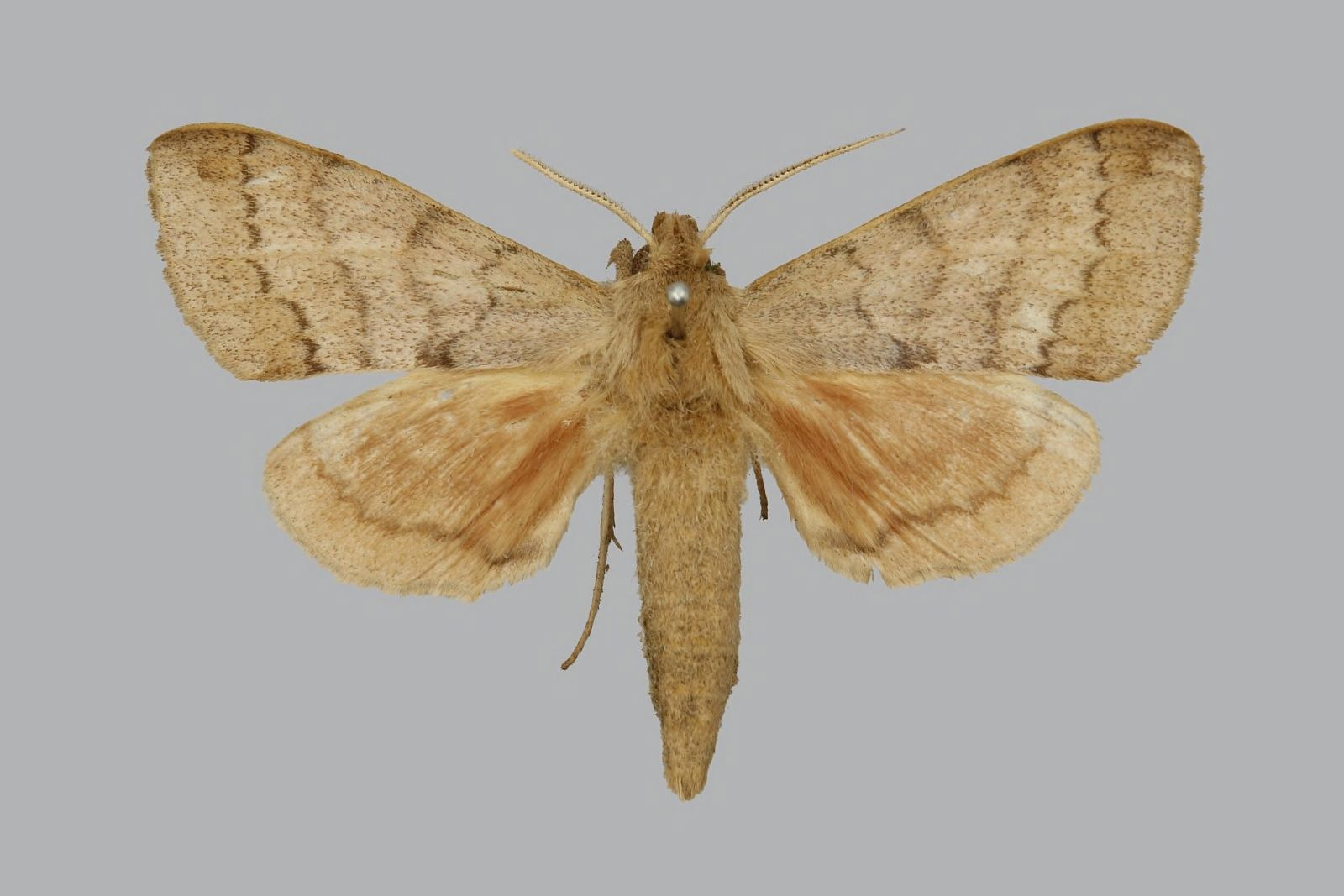

Scientific classification
- Domain: Eukaryota
- Kingdom: Animalia
- Phylum: Arthropoda
- Class: Insecta
- Order: Lepidoptera
- Family: Sphingidae
- Tribe: Smerinthini
- Genus: Pseudandriasa; Carcasson, 1968
- Species: P. mutata

Binomial name
- Pseudandriasa mutata (Walker, 1855)

Synonyms
- Andriasa erubescens Walker, 1862; Lymantria mutata Walker, 1855

= Pseudandriasa =

Genus of moths

Pseudandriasa is a monotypic moth genus in the family Sphingidae erected by Robert Herbert Carcasson in 1968. Its only species, Pseudandriasa mutata, described by Francis Walker in 1855, is known from KwaZulu-Natal in South Africa.
