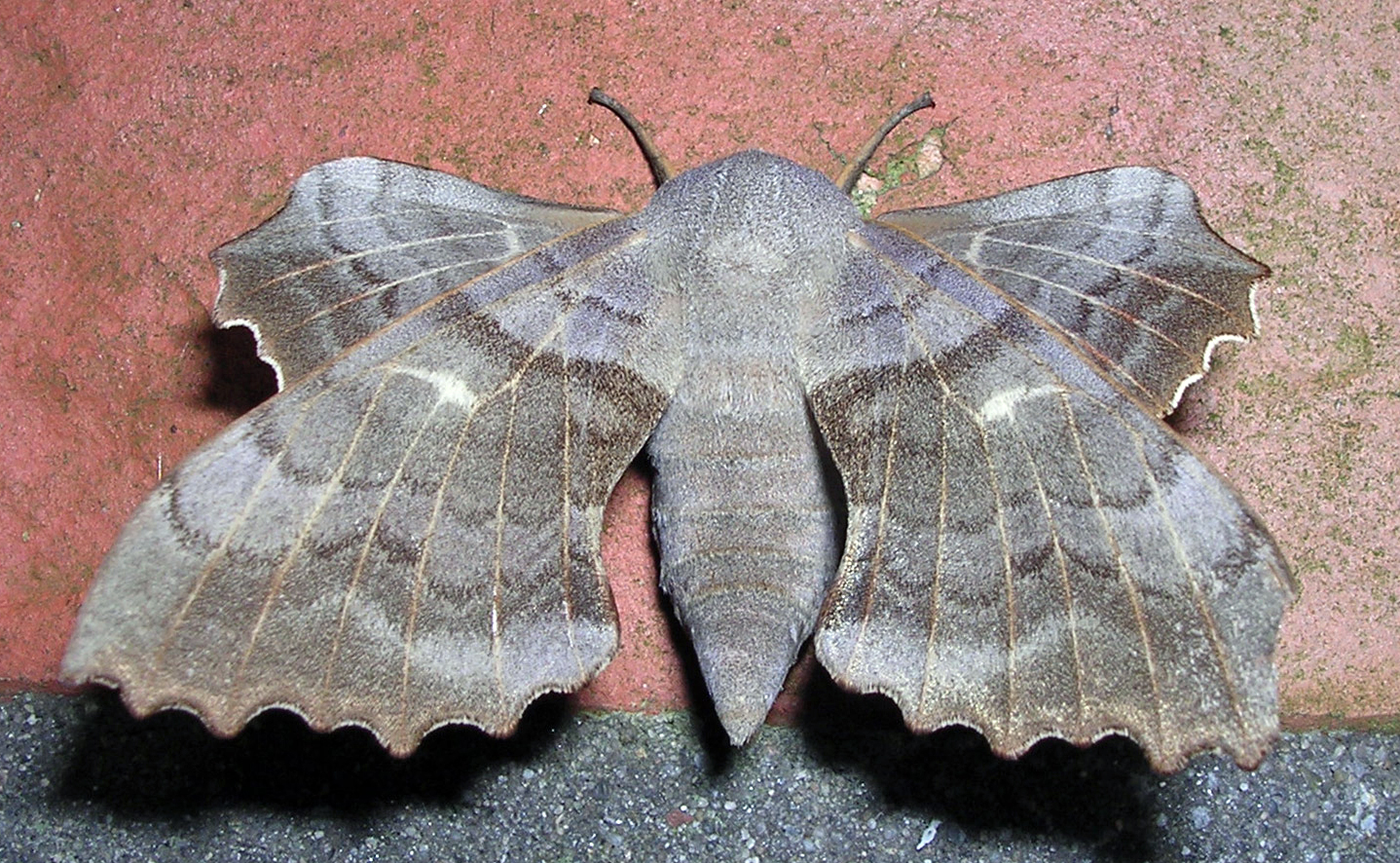
- Laothoe populi

Scientific classification
- Domain: Eukaryota
- Kingdom: Animalia
- Phylum: Arthropoda
- Class: Insecta
- Order: Lepidoptera
- Family: Sphingidae
- Subfamily: Smerinthinae
- Tribe: Smerinthini; Grote & Robinson, 1865

= Smerinthini =

Tribe of moths

Smerinthini is a tribe of moths of the family Sphingidae. The genus was erected by Augustus Radcliffe Grote and Herbert C. Robinson in 1865.

== Taxonomy ==
- Genus Acanthosphinx Aurivillius, 1891
- Genus Afroclanis Carcasson, 1968
- Genus Afrosataspes Basquin & Cadiou, 1986
- Genus Afrosphinx Carcasson, 1968
- Genus Agnosia Rothschild & Jordan, 1903
- Genus Amorpha Hübner, 1809
- Genus Anambulyx Rothschild & Jordan, 1903
- Genus Andriasa Walker, 1856
- Genus Avinoffia Clark, 1929
- Genus Cadiouclanis Eitschberger, 2007
- Genus Callambulyx Rothschild & Jordan, 1903
- Genus Ceridia Rothschild & Jordan, 1903
- Genus Chloroclanis Carcasson, 1968
- Genus Clanidopsis Rothschild & Jordan, 1903
- Genus Clanis Hübner, 1819
- Genus Coequosa Walker, 1856
- Genus Craspedortha Mell, 1922
- Genus Cypa Walker, 1865
- Genus Cypoides Matsumura, 1921
- Genus Daphnusa Walker, 1856
- Genus Dargeclanis Eitschberger, 2007
- Genus Degmaptera Hampson, 1896
- Genus Falcatula Carcasson, 1968
- Genus Grillotius Rougeot, 1973
- Genus Gynoeryx Carcasson, 1968
- Genus Imber Moulds, Tuttle & Lane, 2010
- Genus Langia Moore, 1872
- Genus Laothoe Fabricius, 1807
- Genus Larunda Kernbach, 1954
- Genus Leptoclanis Rothschild & Jordan, 1903
- Genus Leucophlebia Westwood, 1847
- Genus Likoma Rothschild & Jordan, 1903
- Genus Lophostethus Butler, 1876
- Genus Lycosphingia Rothschild & Jordan, 1903
- Genus Malgassoclanis Carcasson, 1968
- Genus Marumba Moore, 1882
- Genus Microclanis Carcasson, 1968
- Genus Mimas Hübner, 1819
- Genus Morwennius Cassidy, Allen & Harman, 2002
- Genus Neoclanis Carcasson, 1968
- Genus Neopolyptychus Carcasson, 1968
- Genus Opistoclanis Jordan, 1929
- Genus Oplerclanis Eitschberger, 2007
- Genus Pachysphinx Rothschild & Jordan, 1903
- Genus Paonias Hübner, 1819
- Genus Parum Rothschild & Jordan, 1903
- Genus Phyllosphingia Swinhoe, 1897
- Genus Phylloxiphia Rothschild & Jordan, 1903
- Genus Pierreclanis Eitschberger, 2007
- Genus Platysphinx Rothschild & Jordan, 1903
- Genus Poliodes Rothschild & Jordan, 1903
- Genus Polyptychoides Carcasson, 1968
- Genus Polyptychopsis Carcasson, 1968
- Genus Polyptychus Hübner, 1819
- Genus Pseudandriasa Carcasson, 1968
- Genus Pseudoclanis Rothschild, 1894
- Genus Pseudopolyptychus Carcasson, 1968
- Genus Rhadinopasa Karsch, 1891
- Genus Rhodambulyx Mell, 1939
- Genus Rhodoprasina Rothschild & Jordan, 1903
- Genus Rufoclanis Carcasson, 1968
- Genus Sataspes Moore, 1858
- Genus Smerinthulus Huwe, 1895
- Genus Smerinthus Latreille, 1802
- Genus Viriclanis Aarvik, 1999
- Genus Xenosphingia Jordan, 1920

== Gallery ==
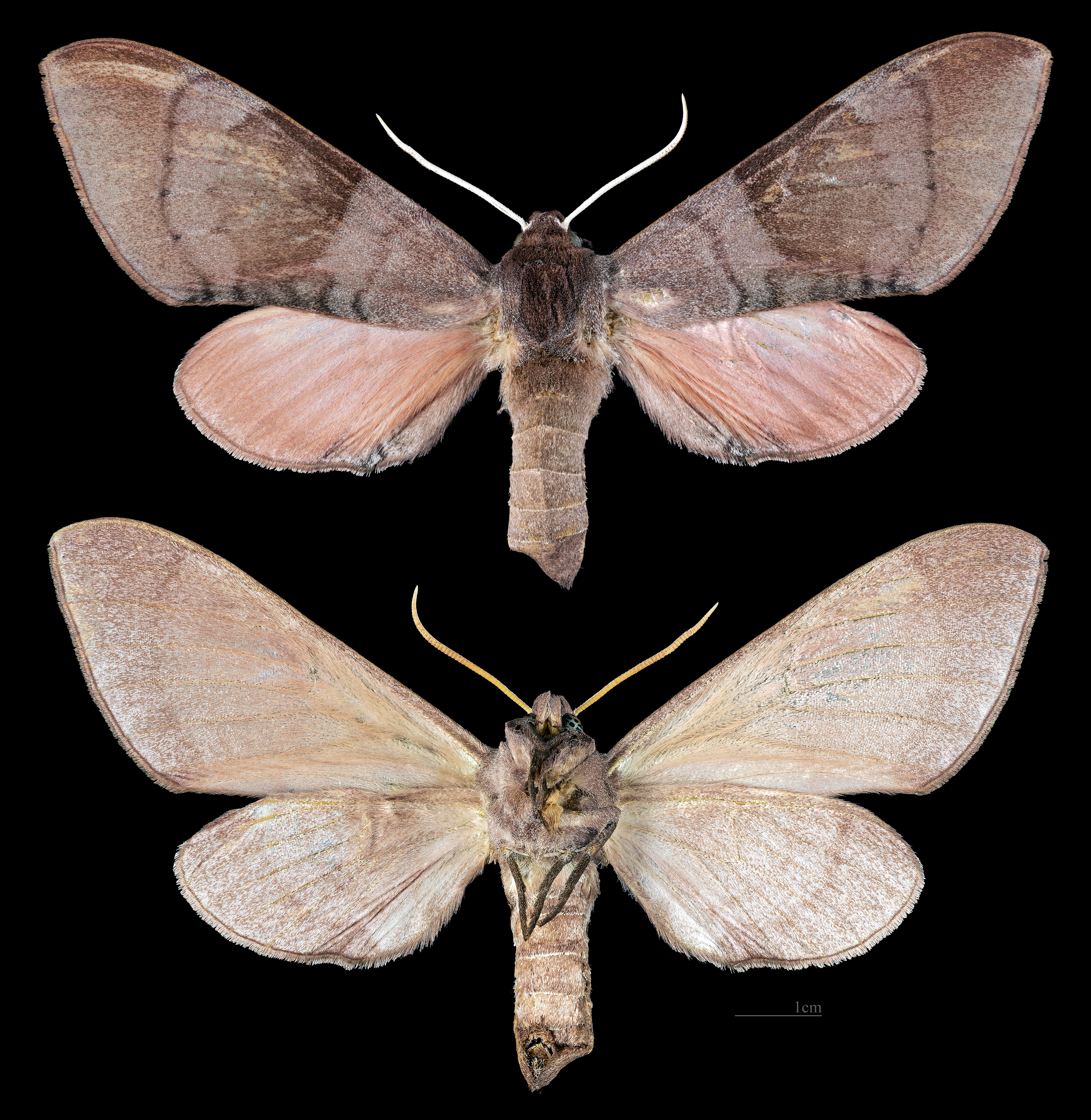
Agnosia

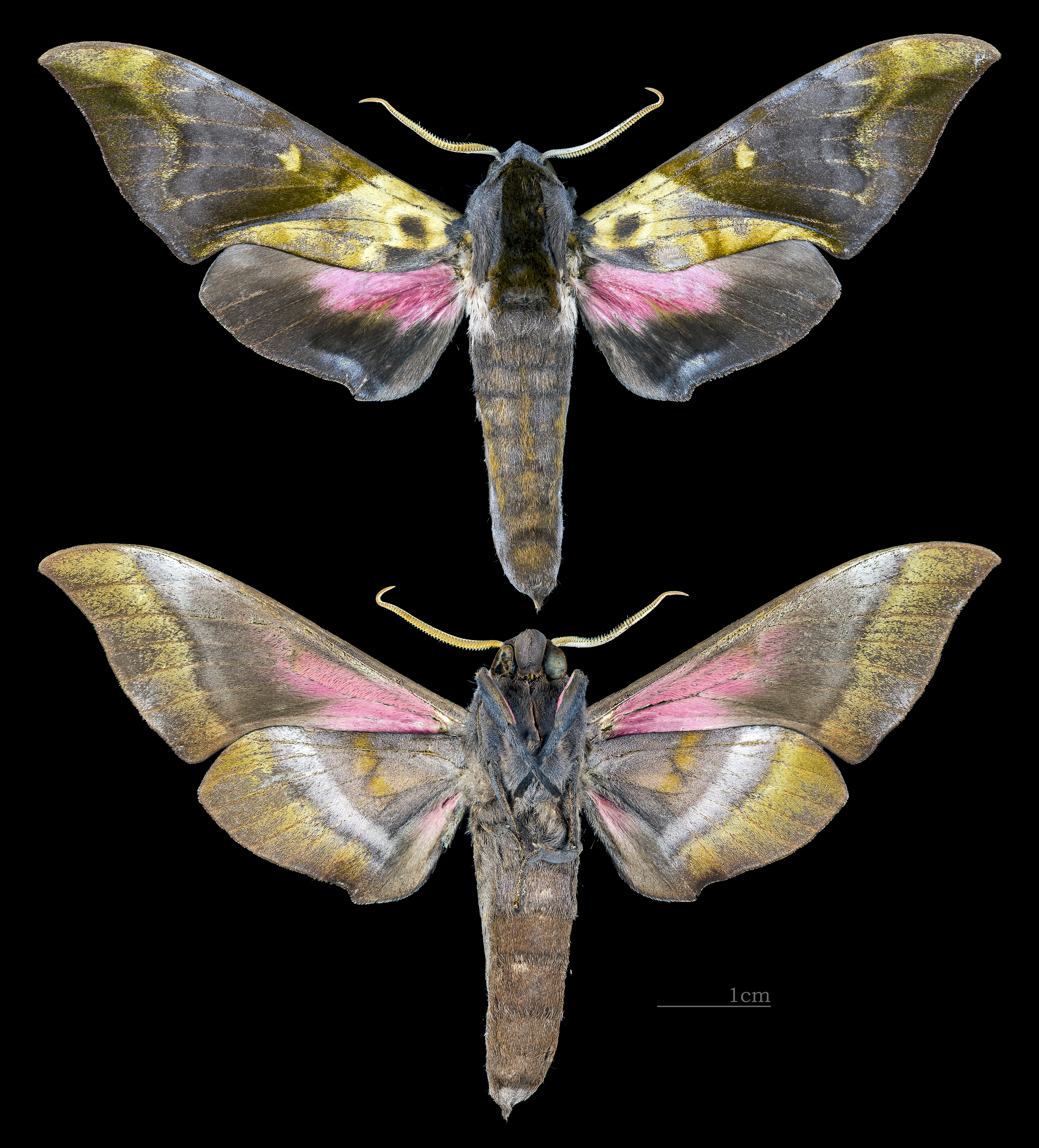
Anambulyx

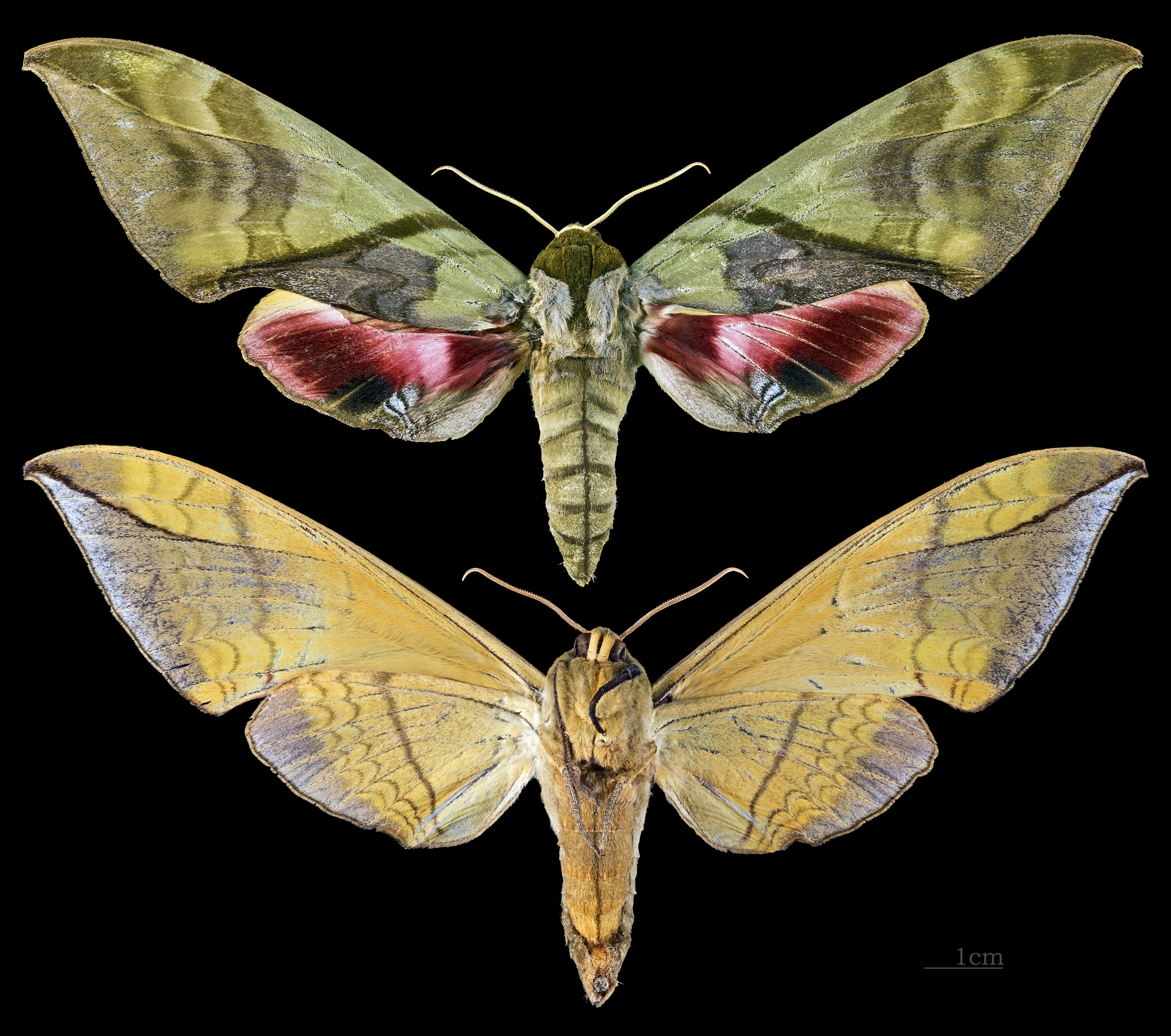
Callambulyx

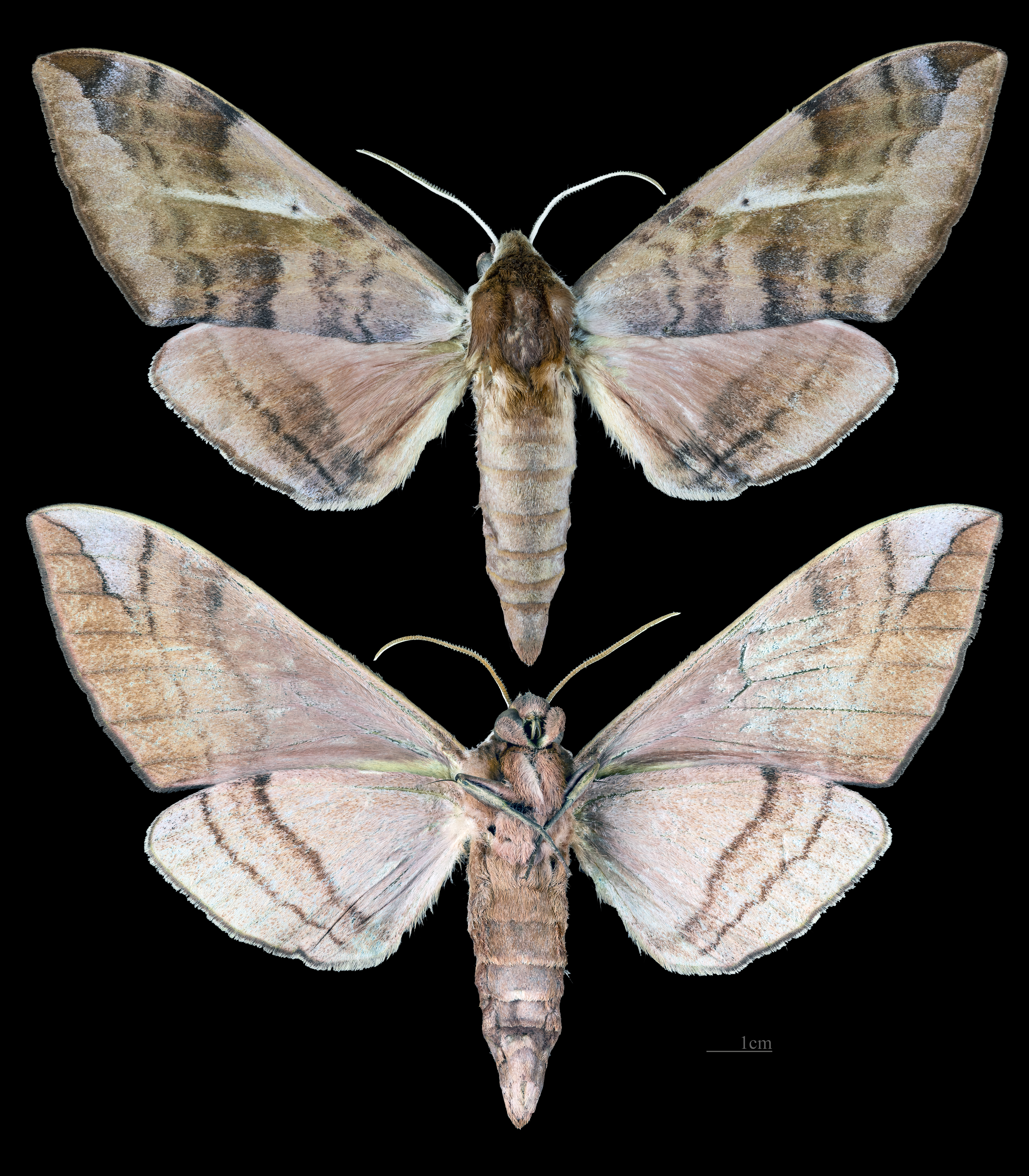
Clanidopsis

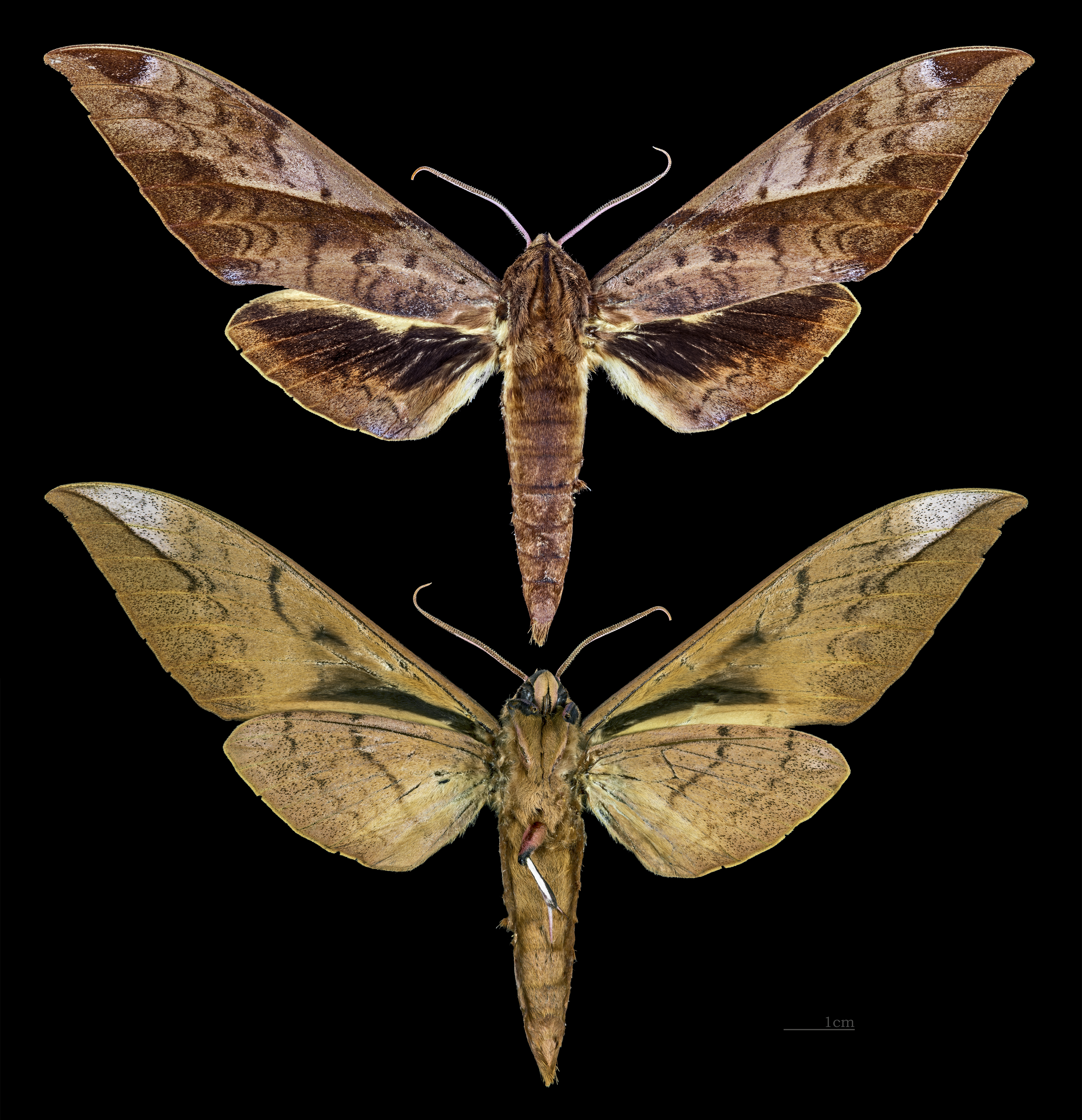
Clanis

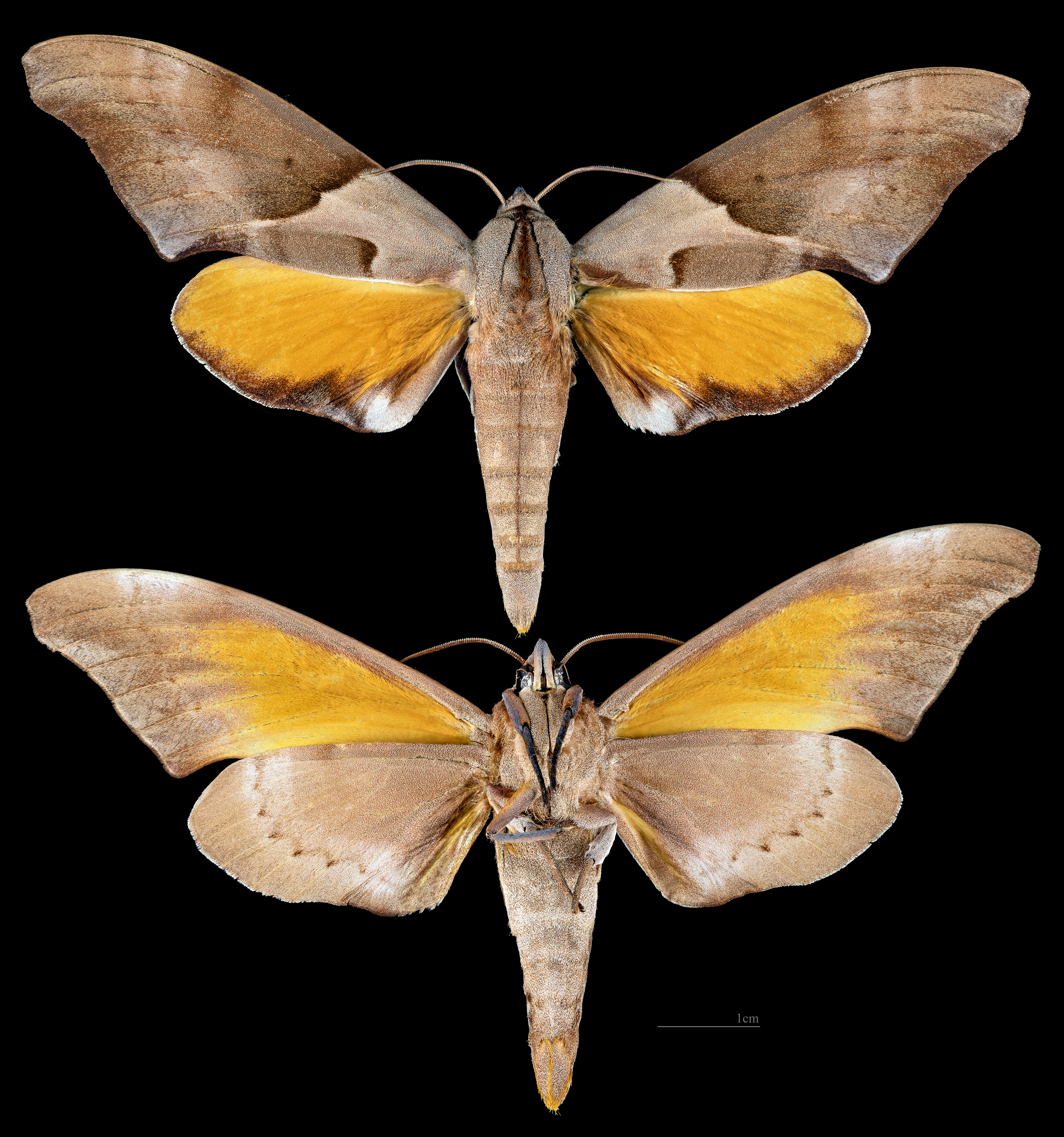
Coequosa

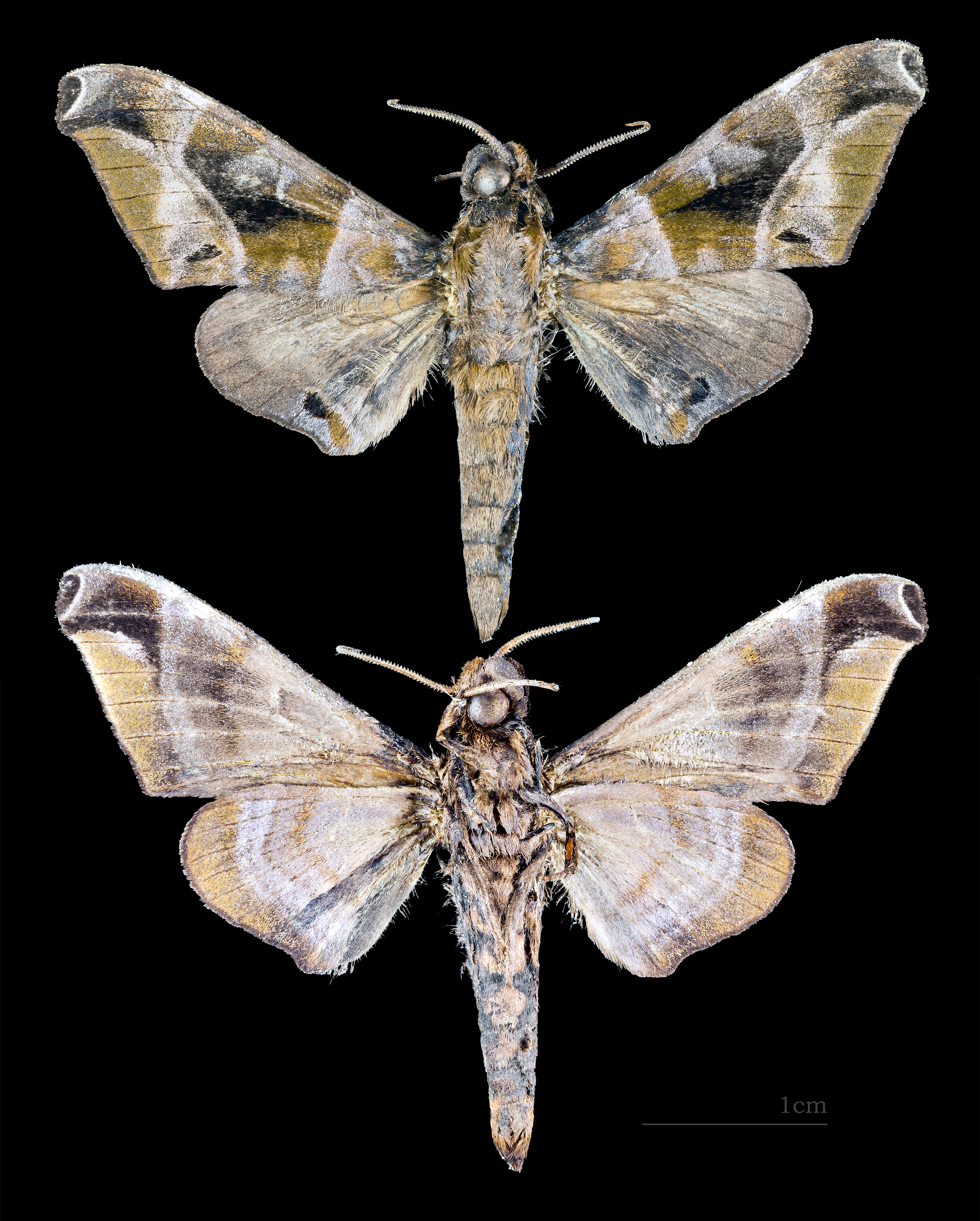
Craspedortha

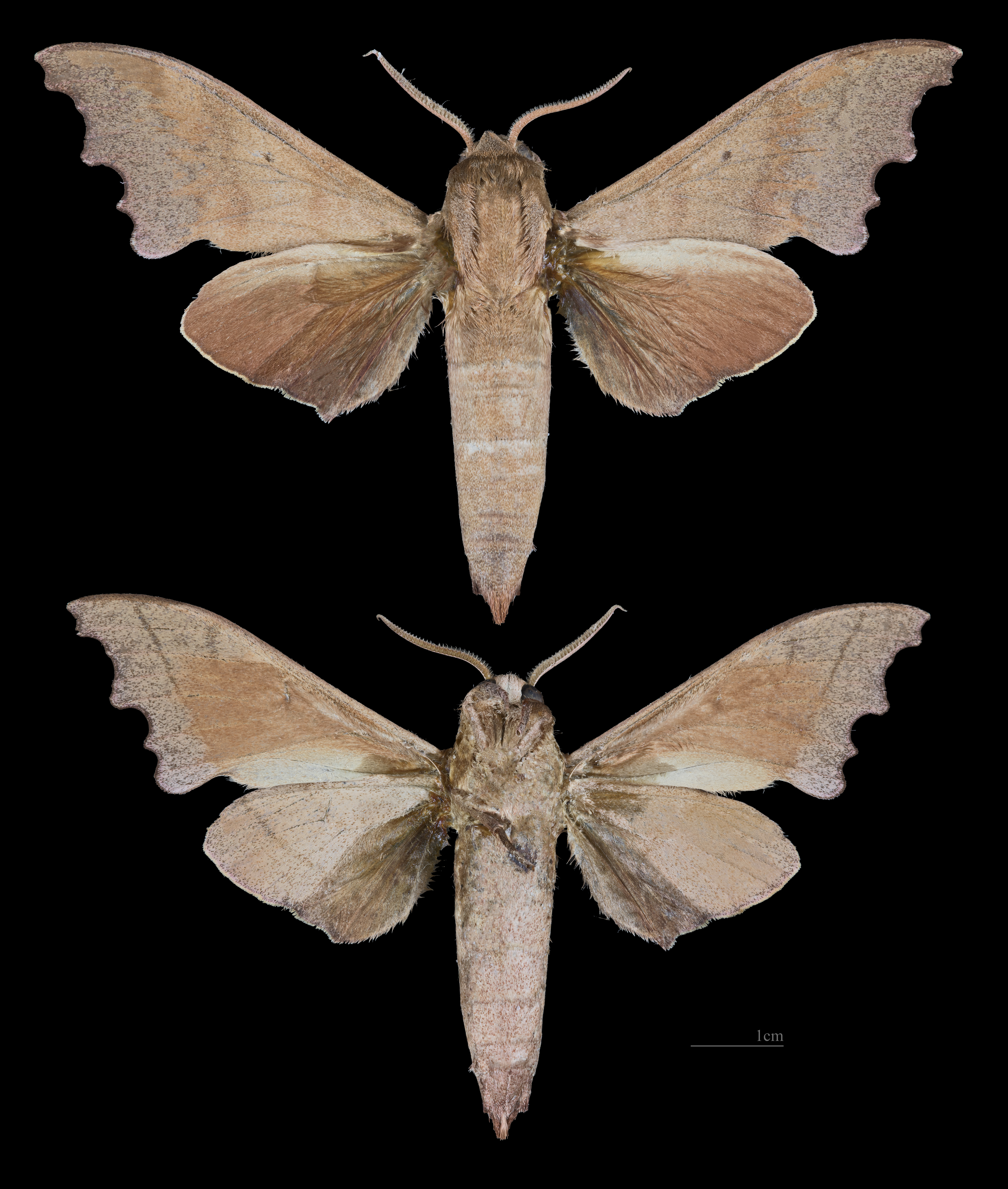
Cypa

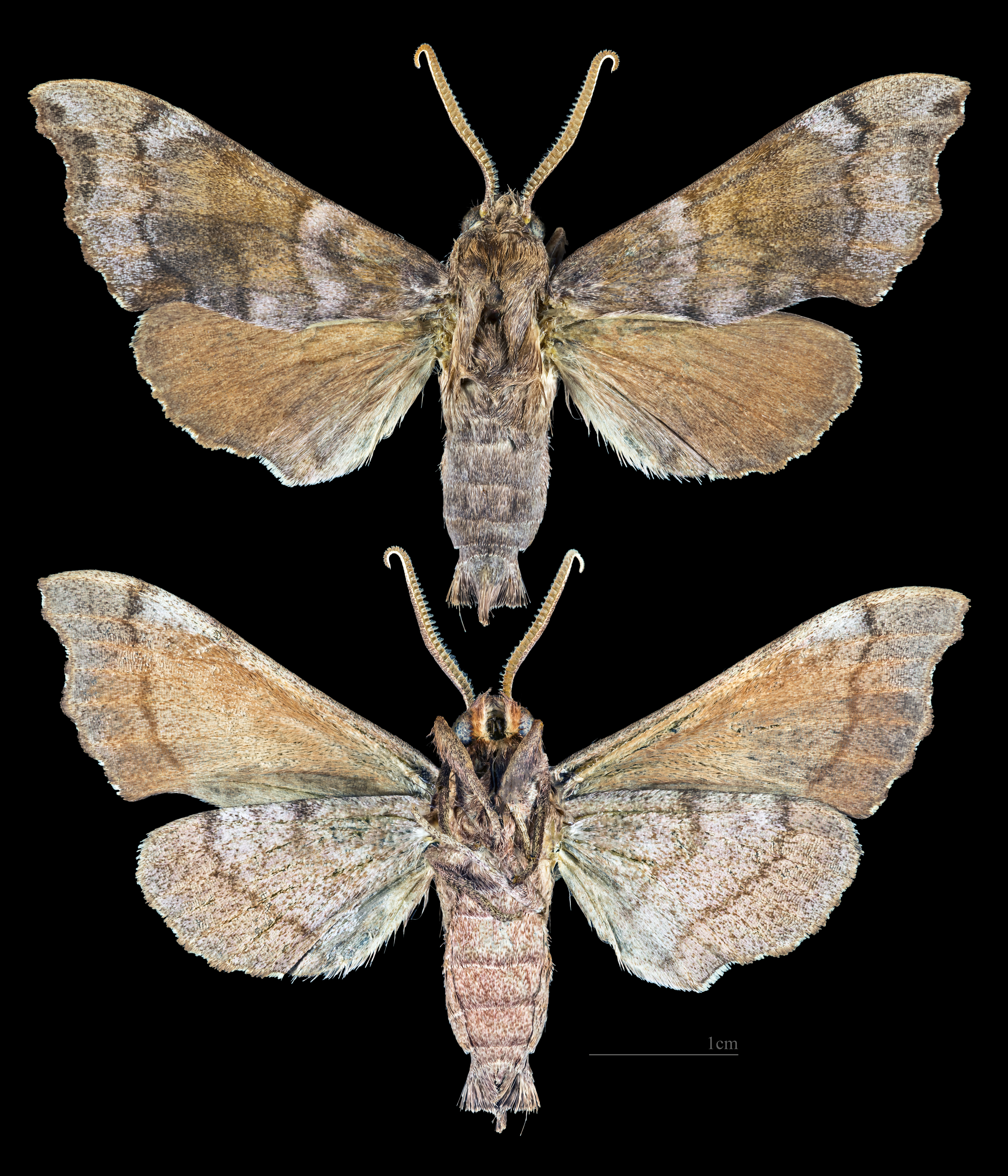
Cypoides

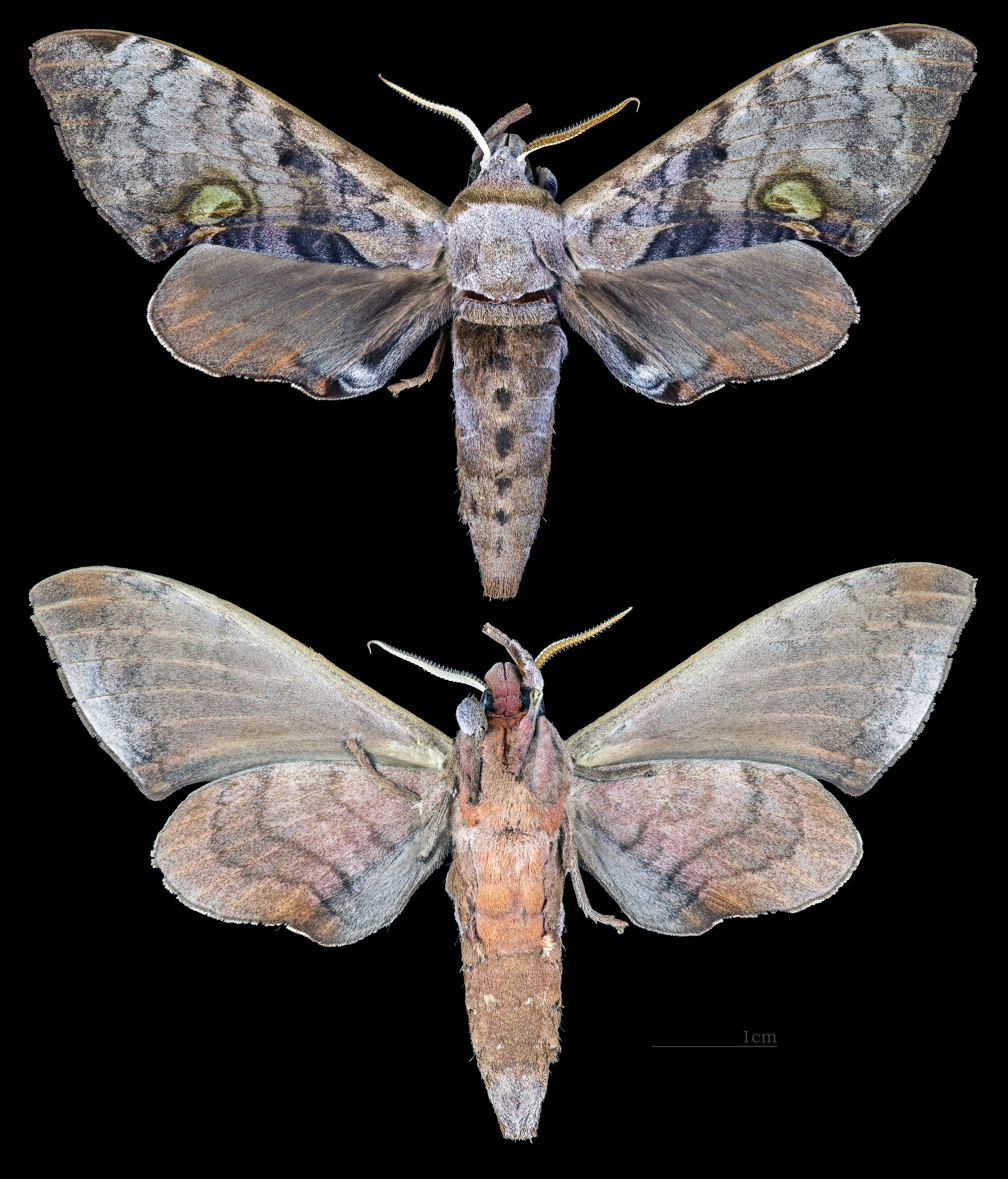
Daphnusa

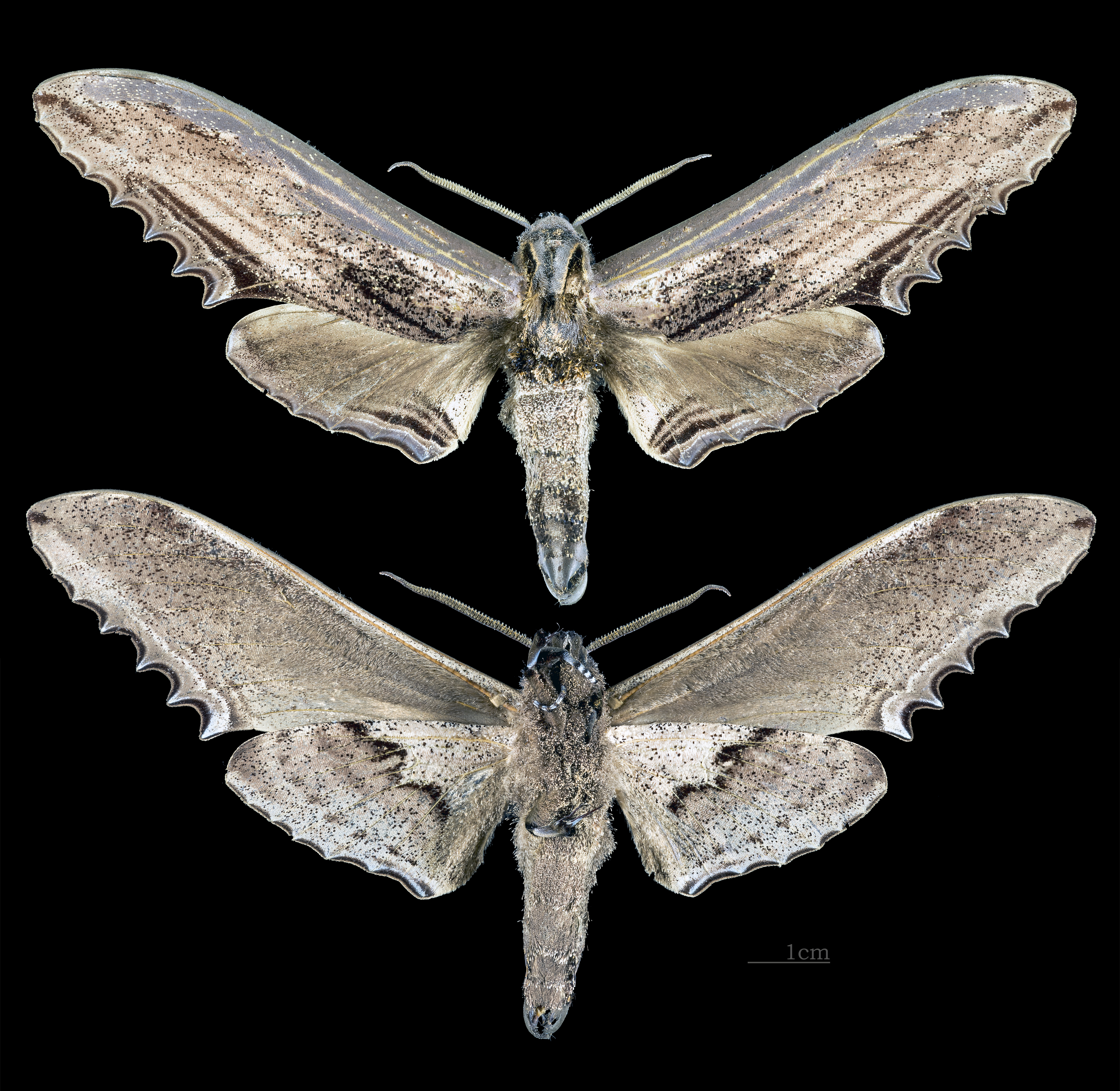
Langia

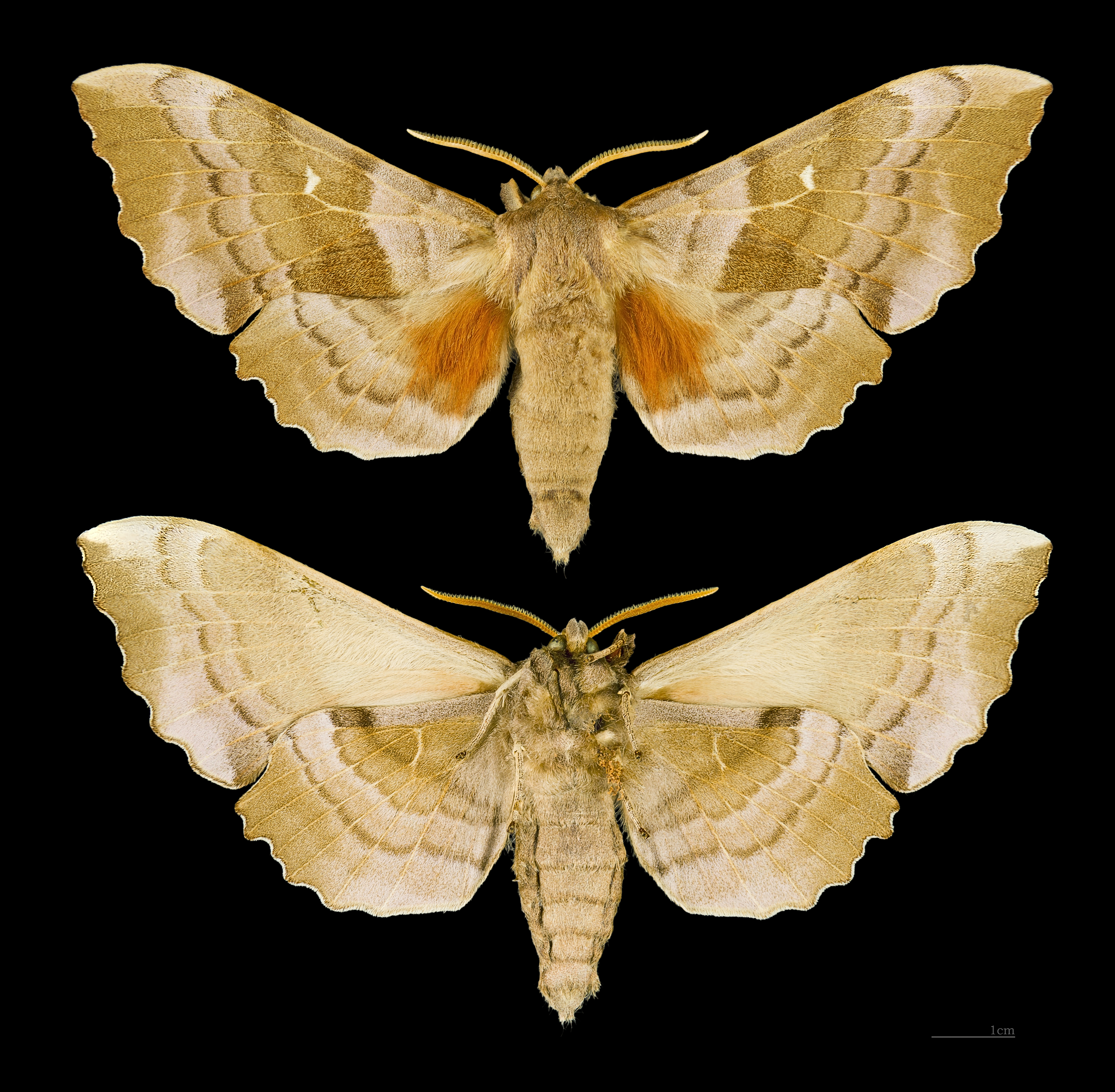
Laothoe

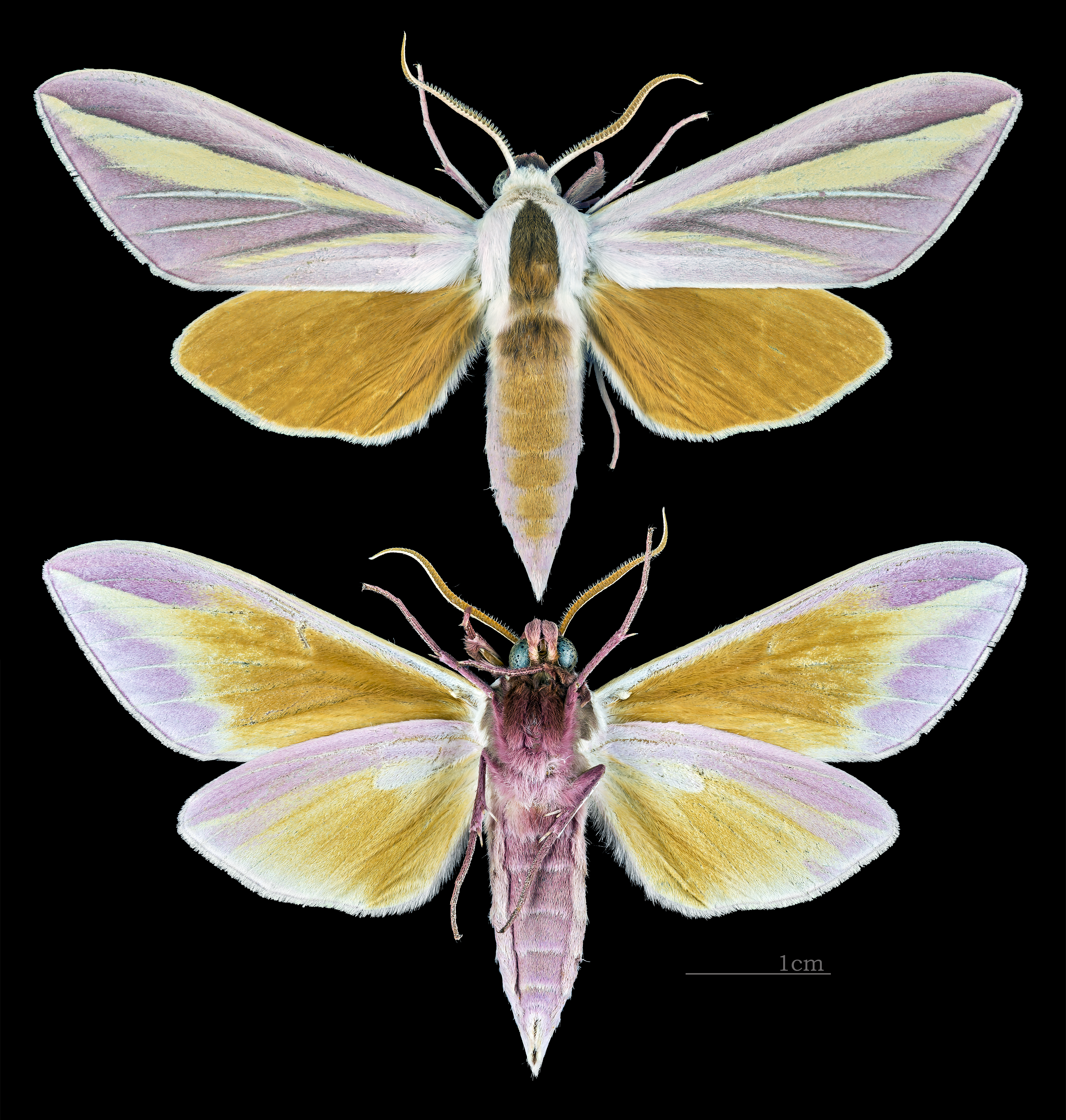
Leucophlebia

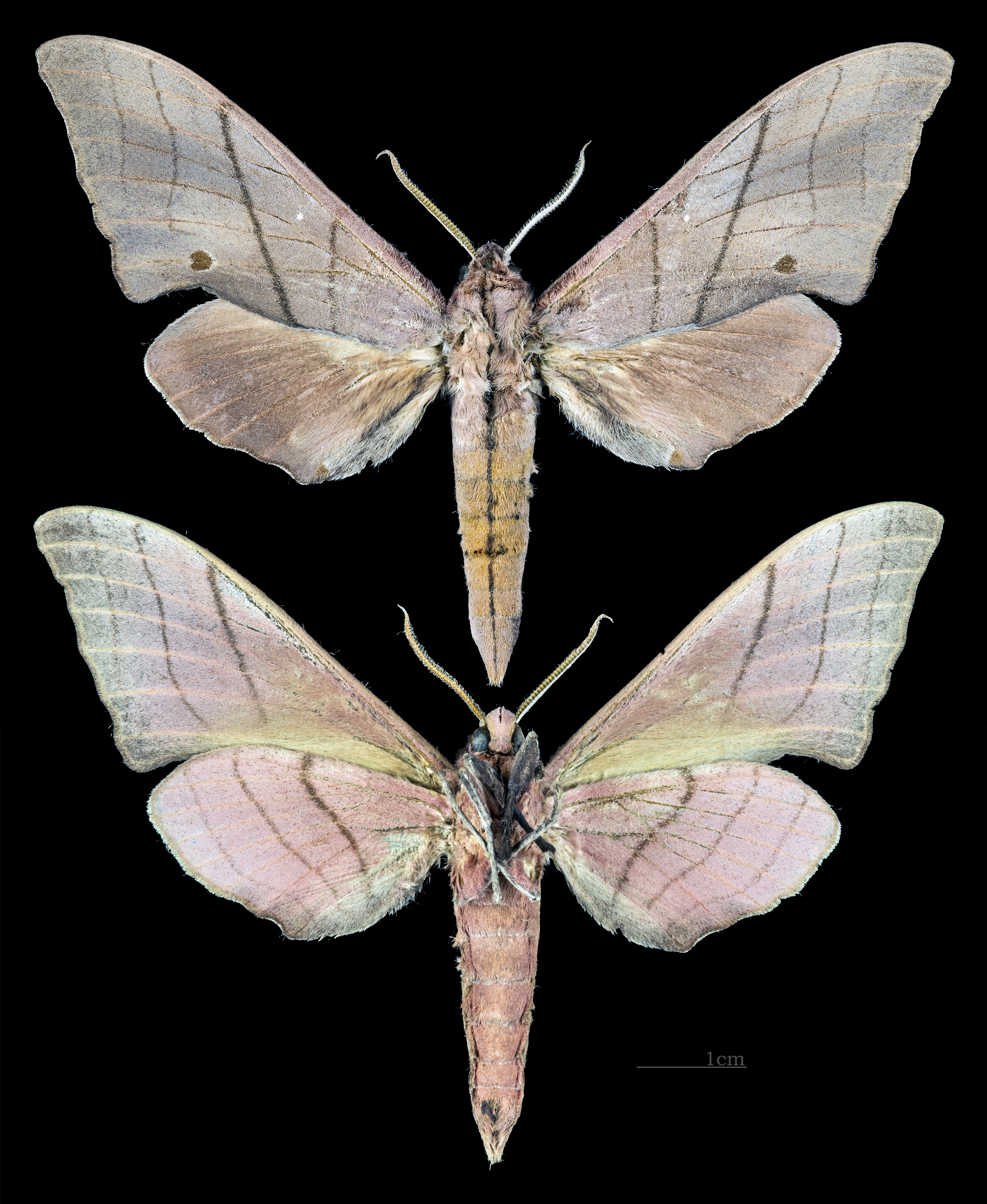
Marumba

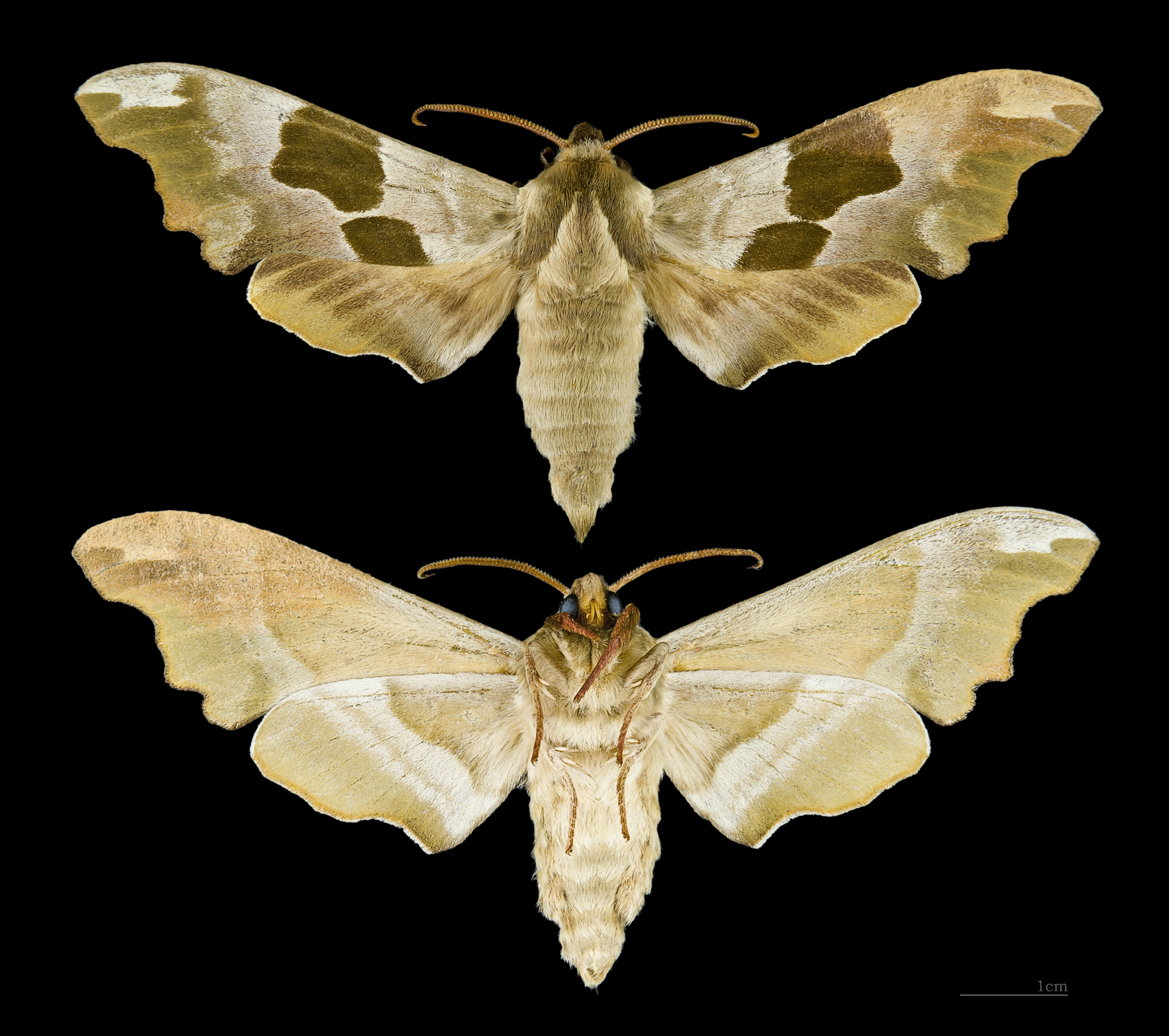
Mimas

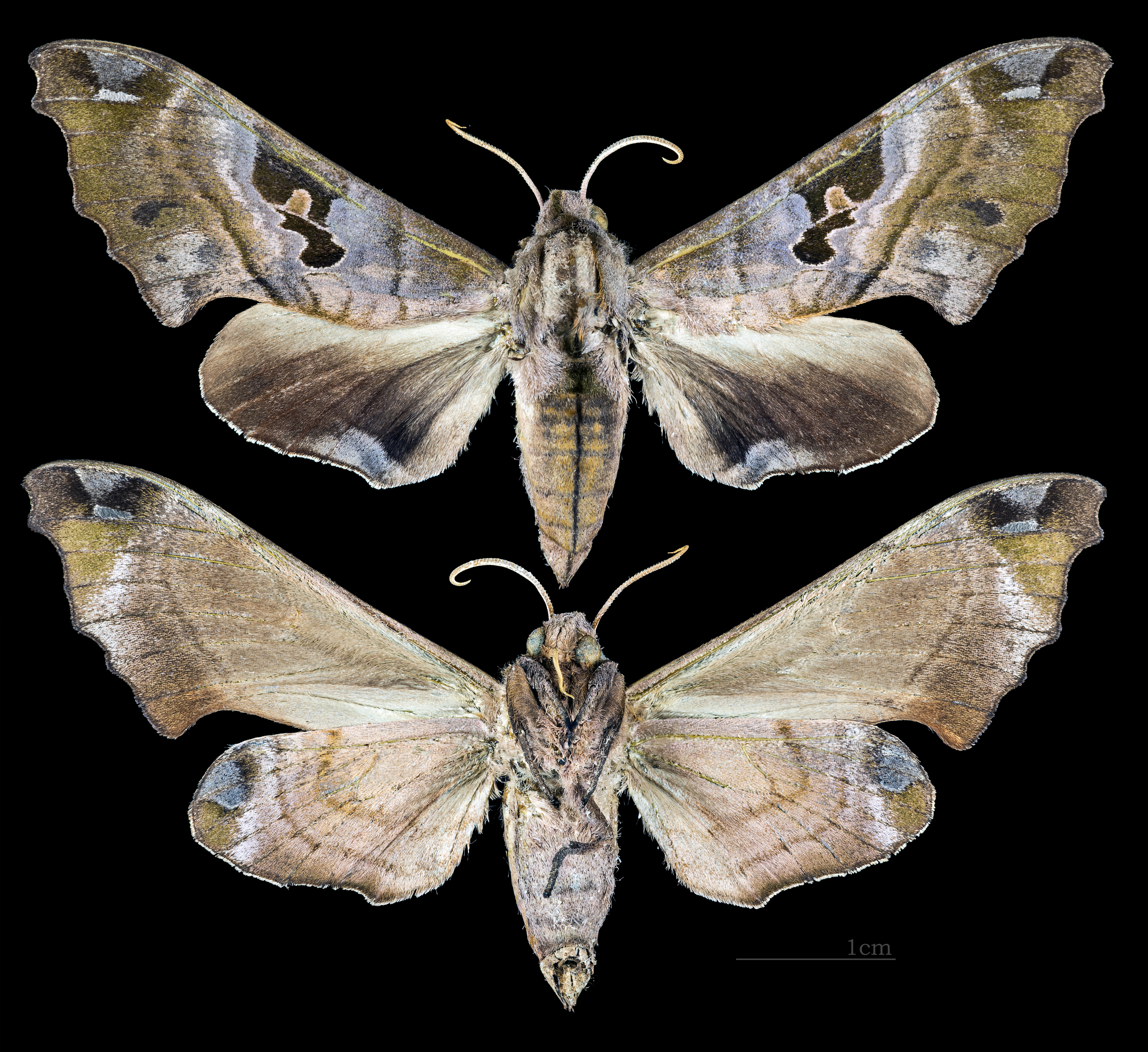
Morwennius

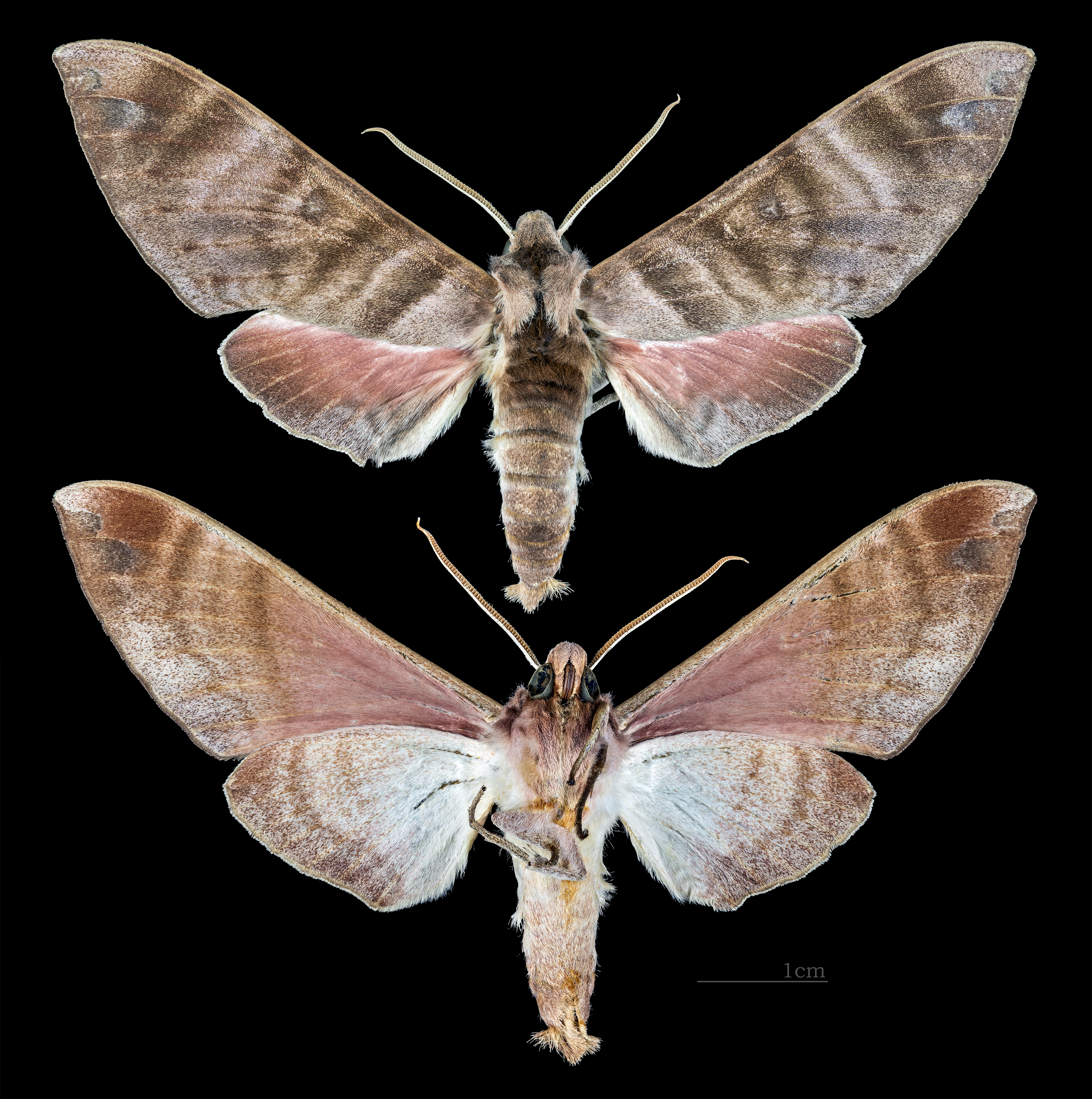
Opistoclanis

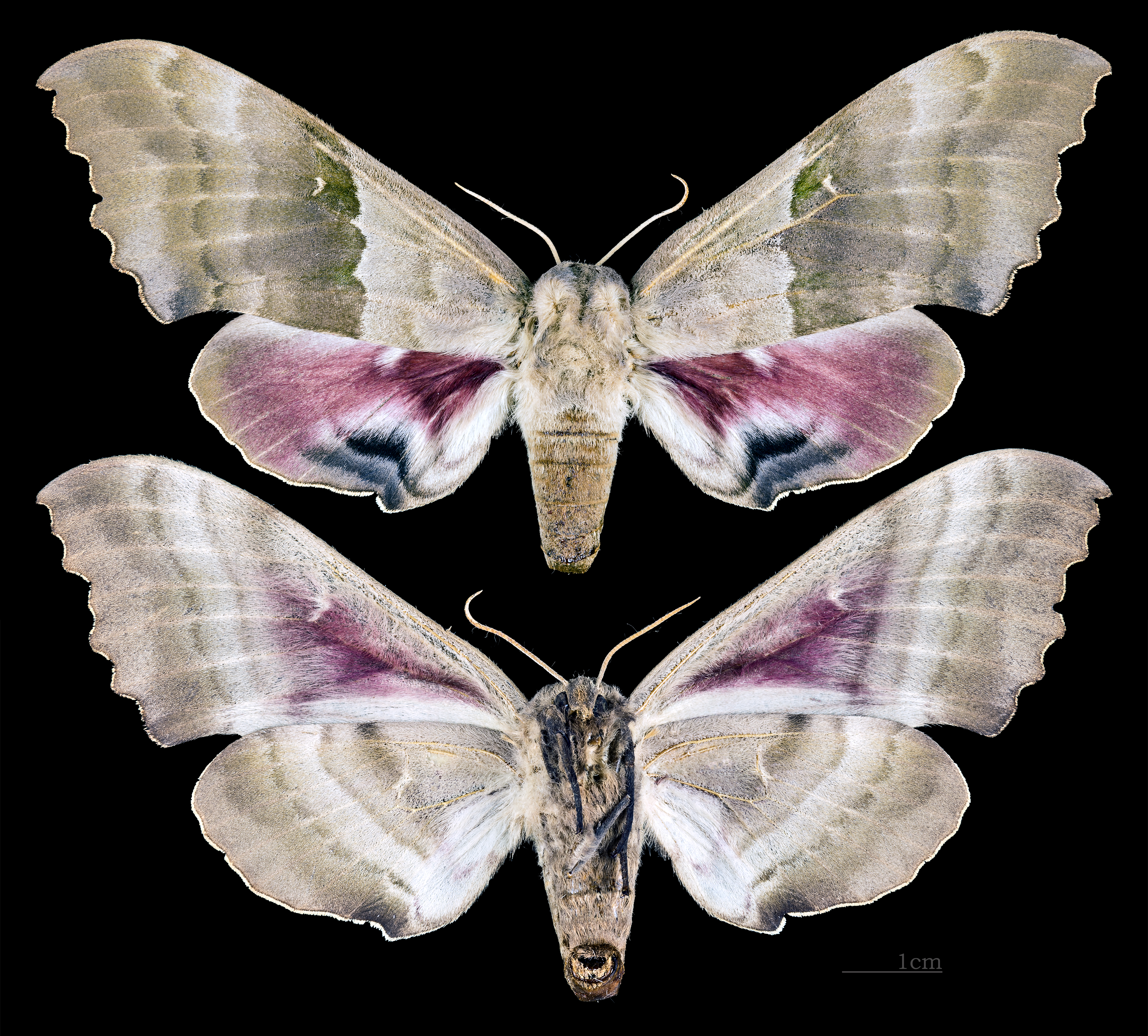
Pachysphinx

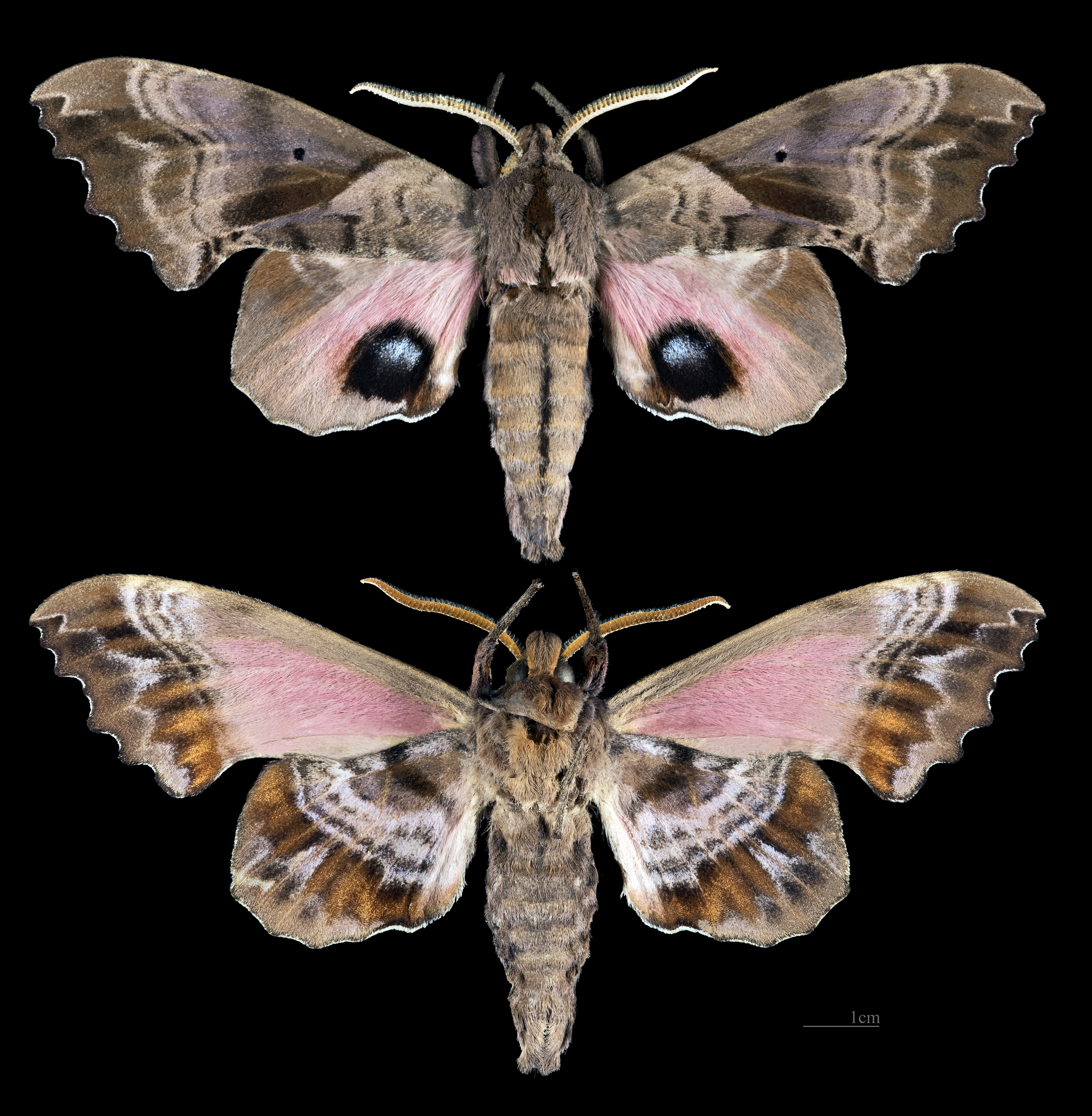
Paonias

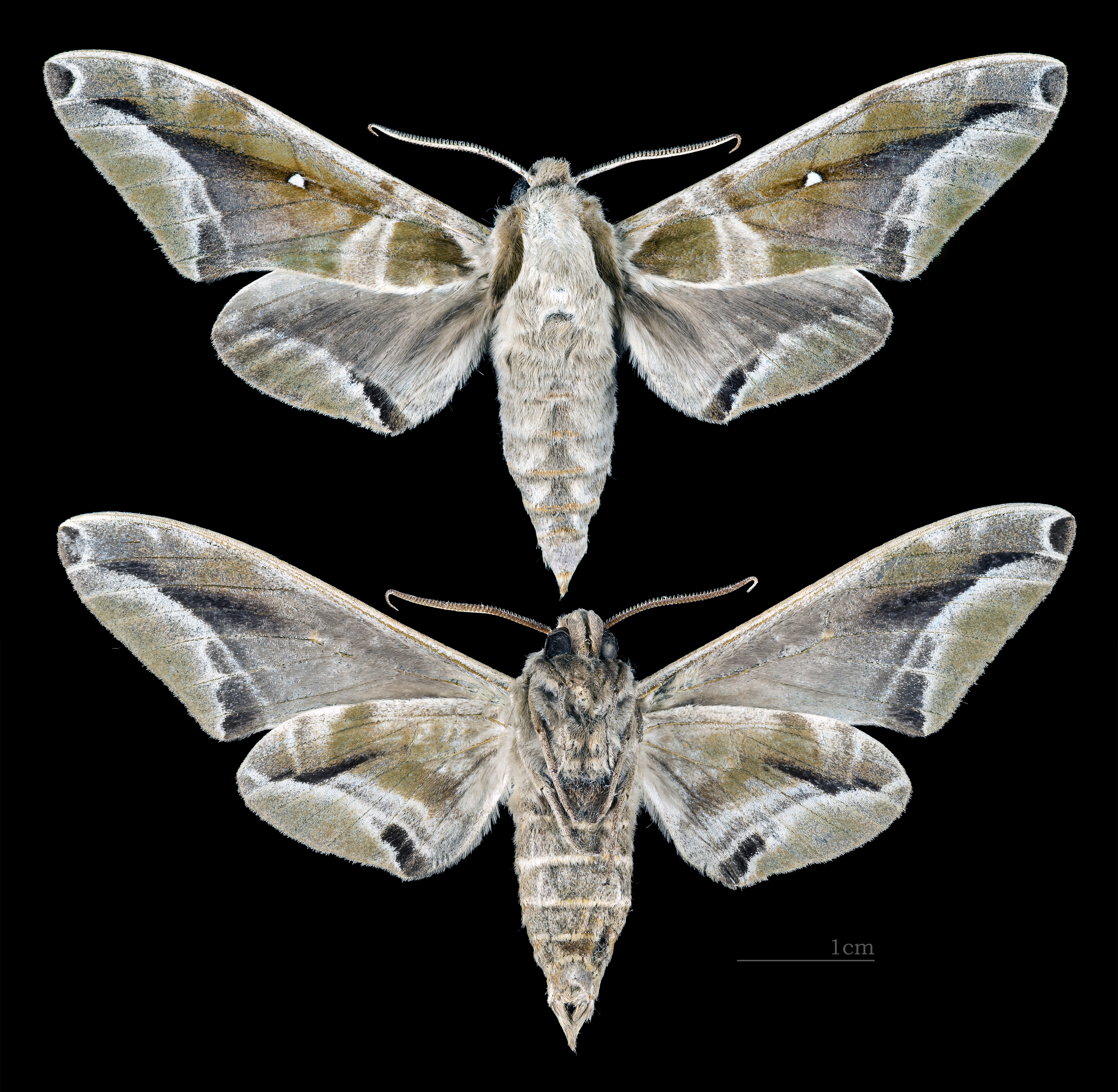
Parum

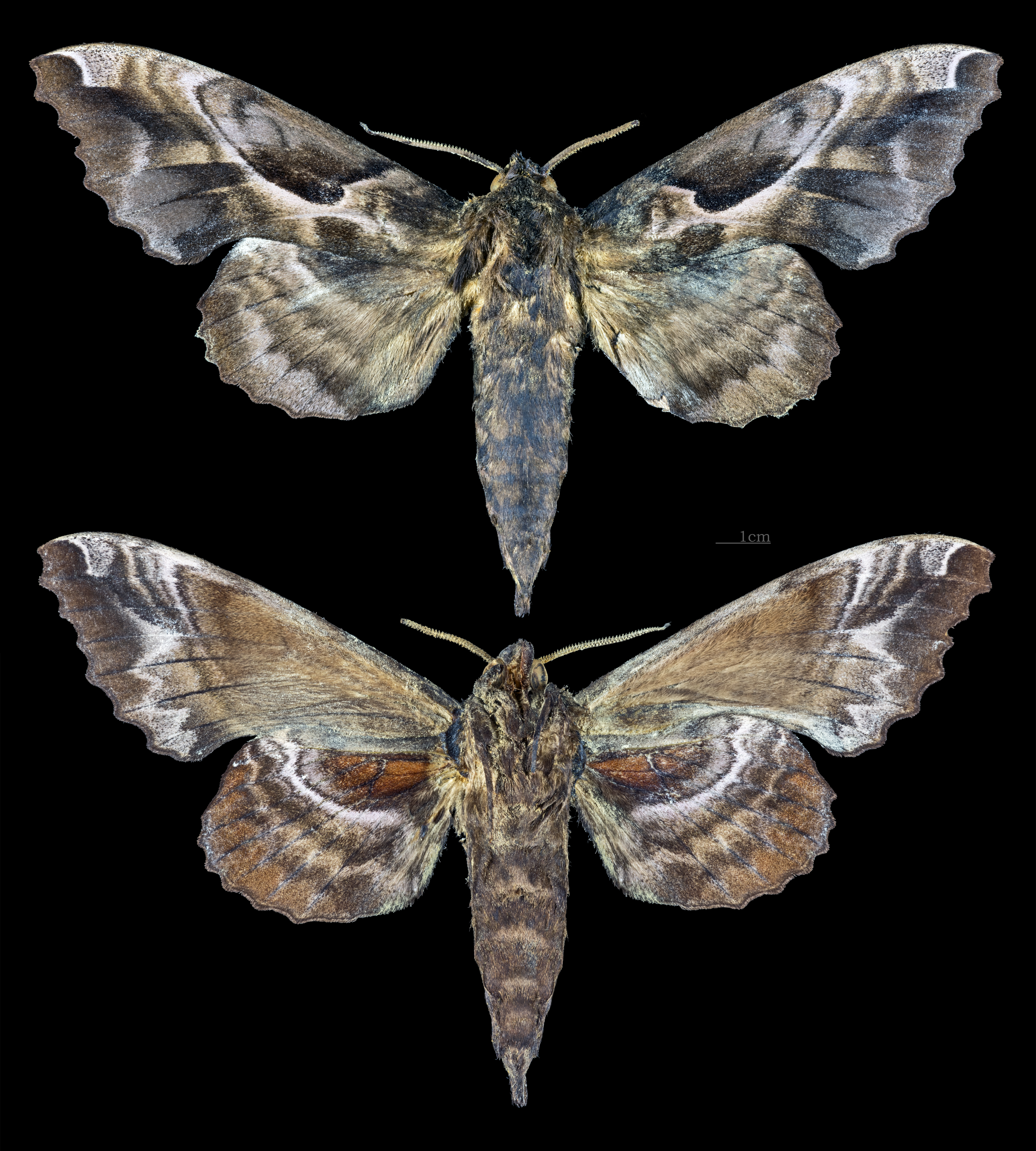
Phyllosphingia

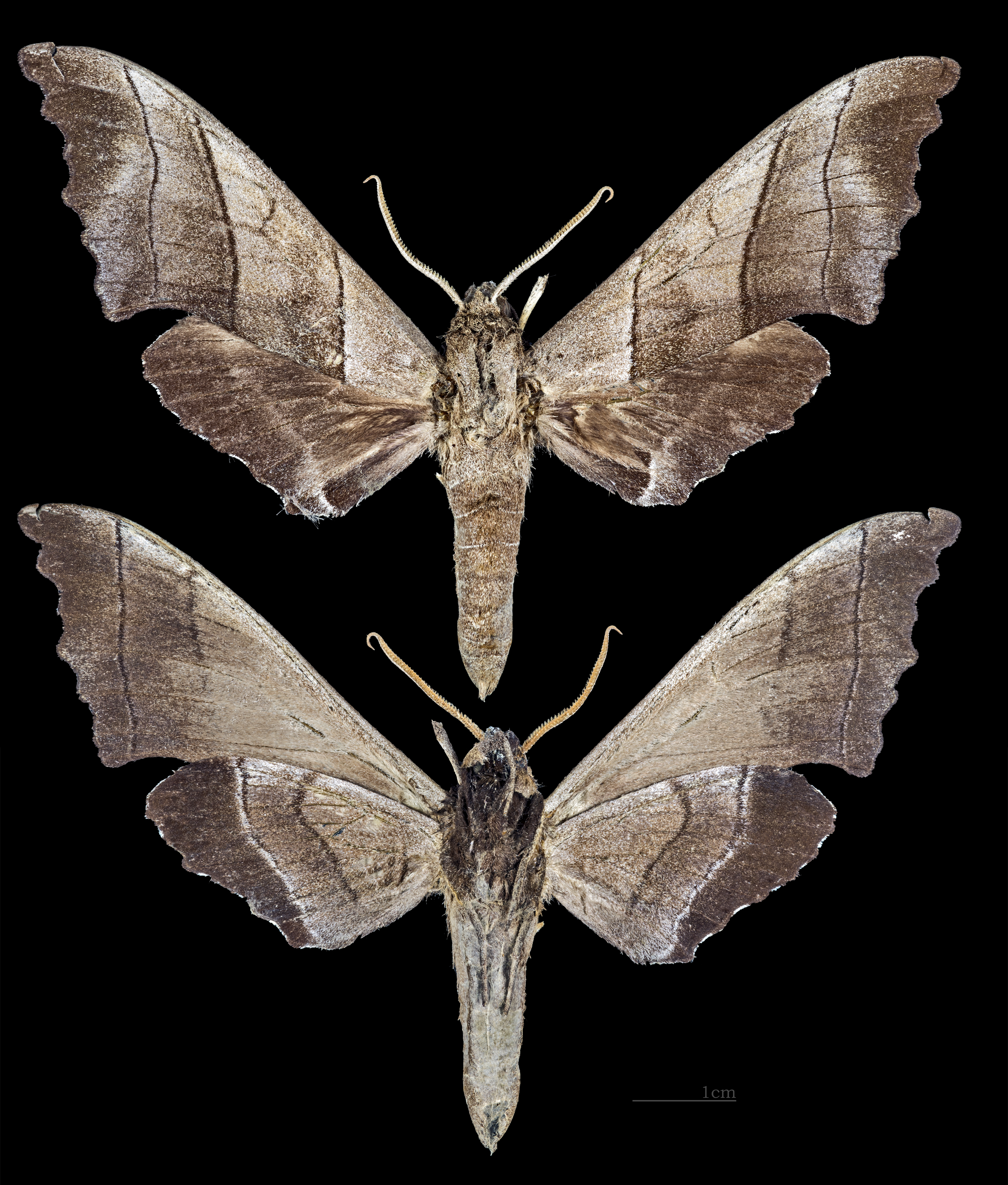
Polyptychus

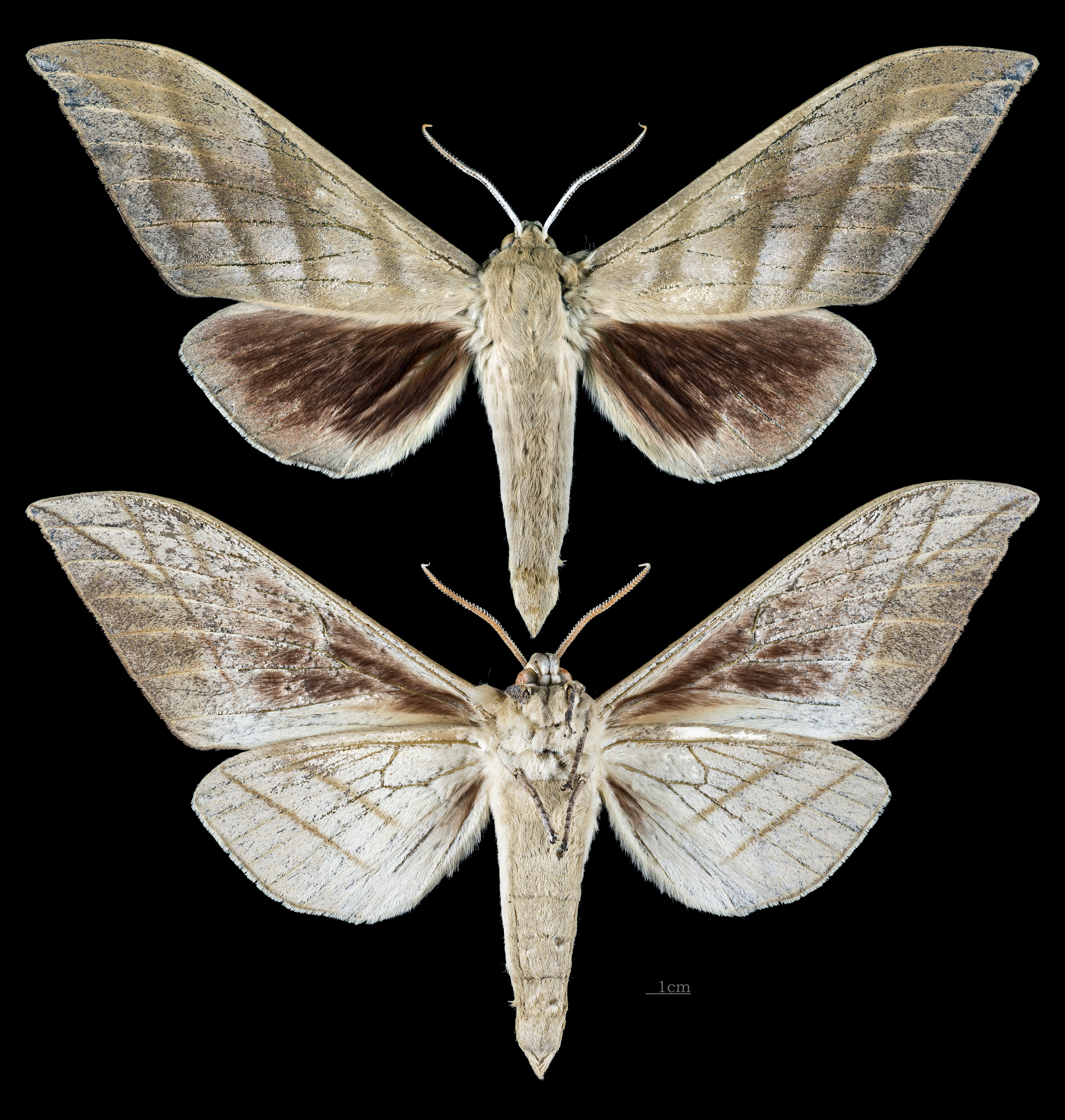
Rhodambulyx

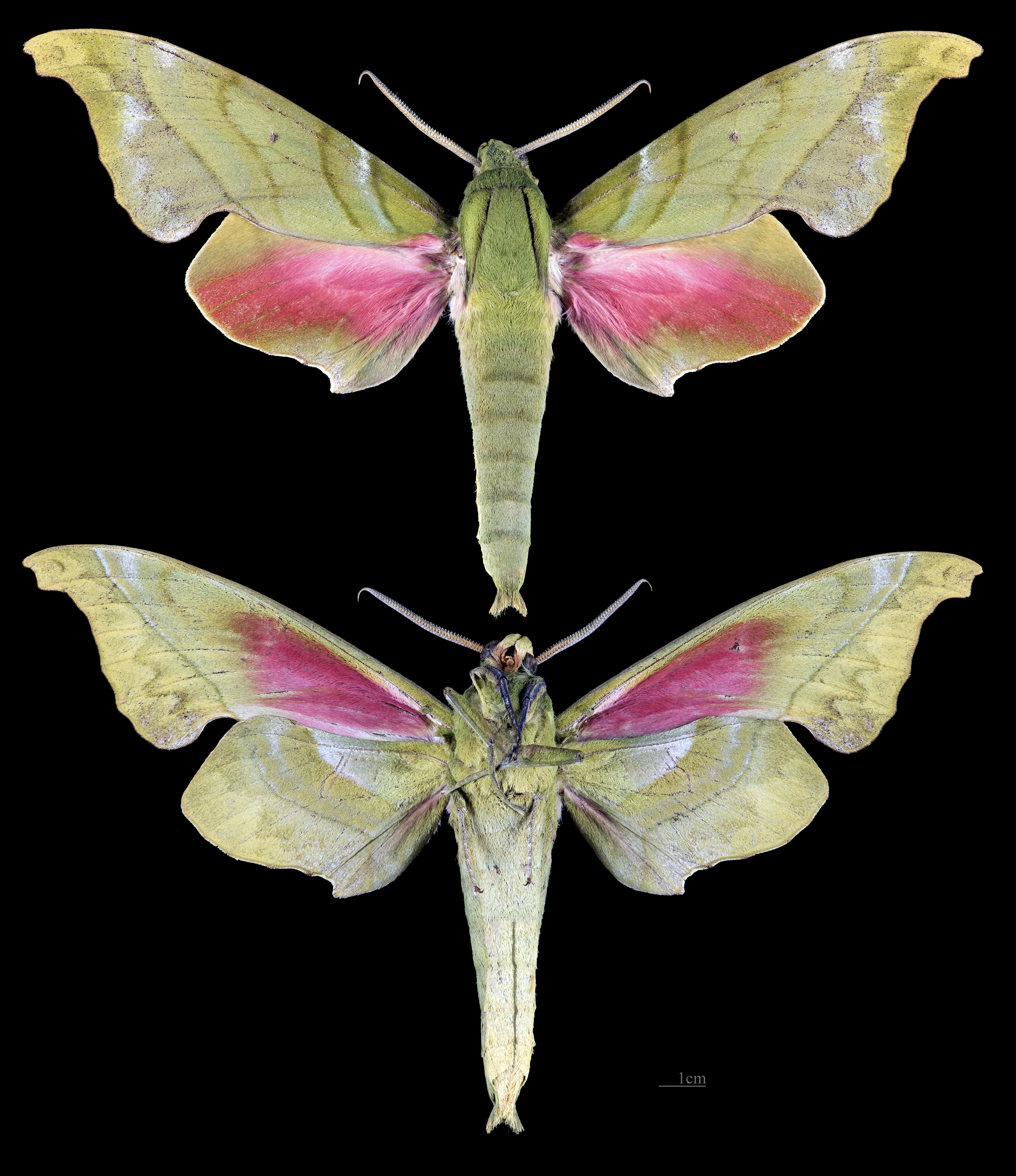
Rhodoprasina

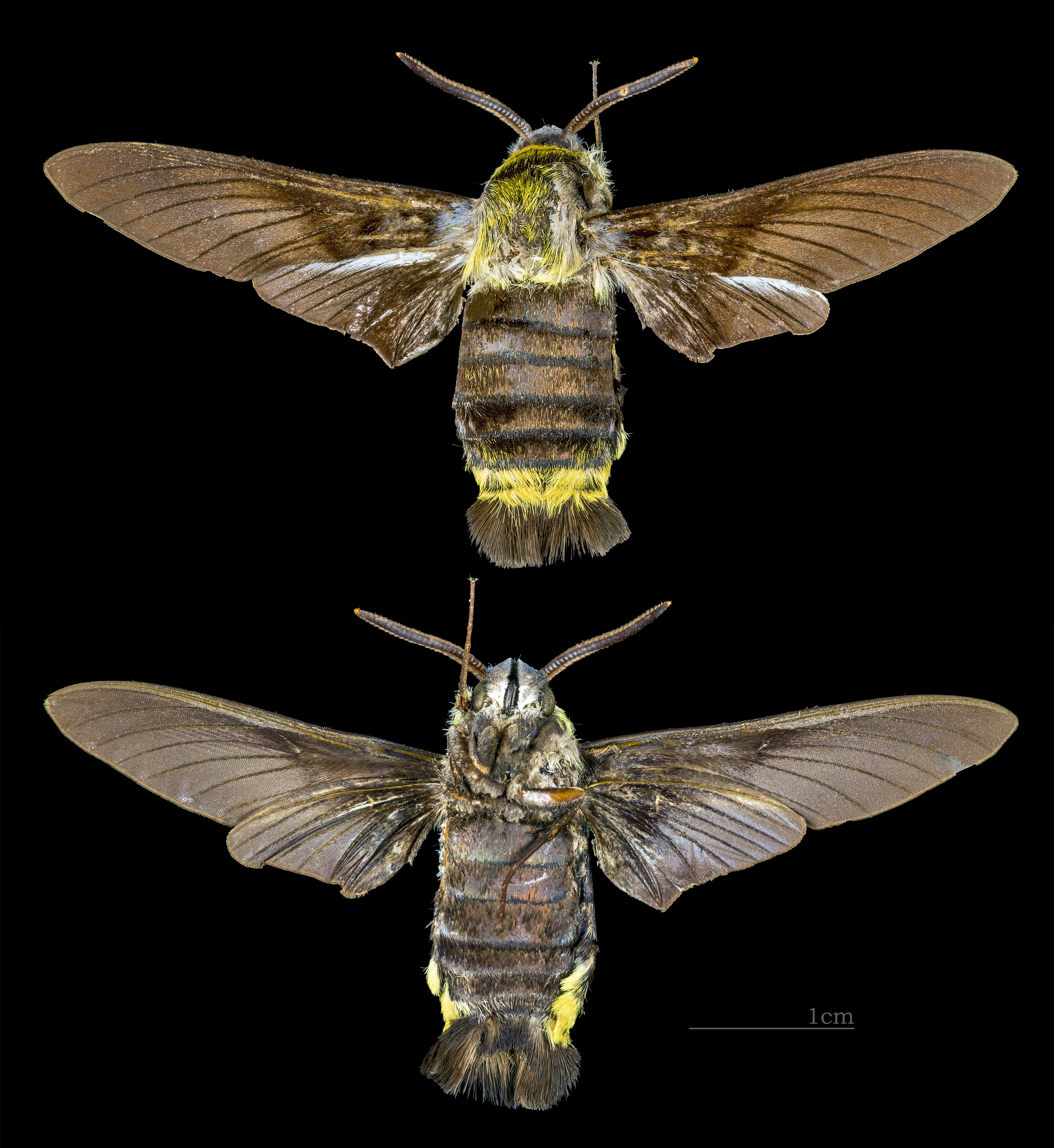
Sataspes

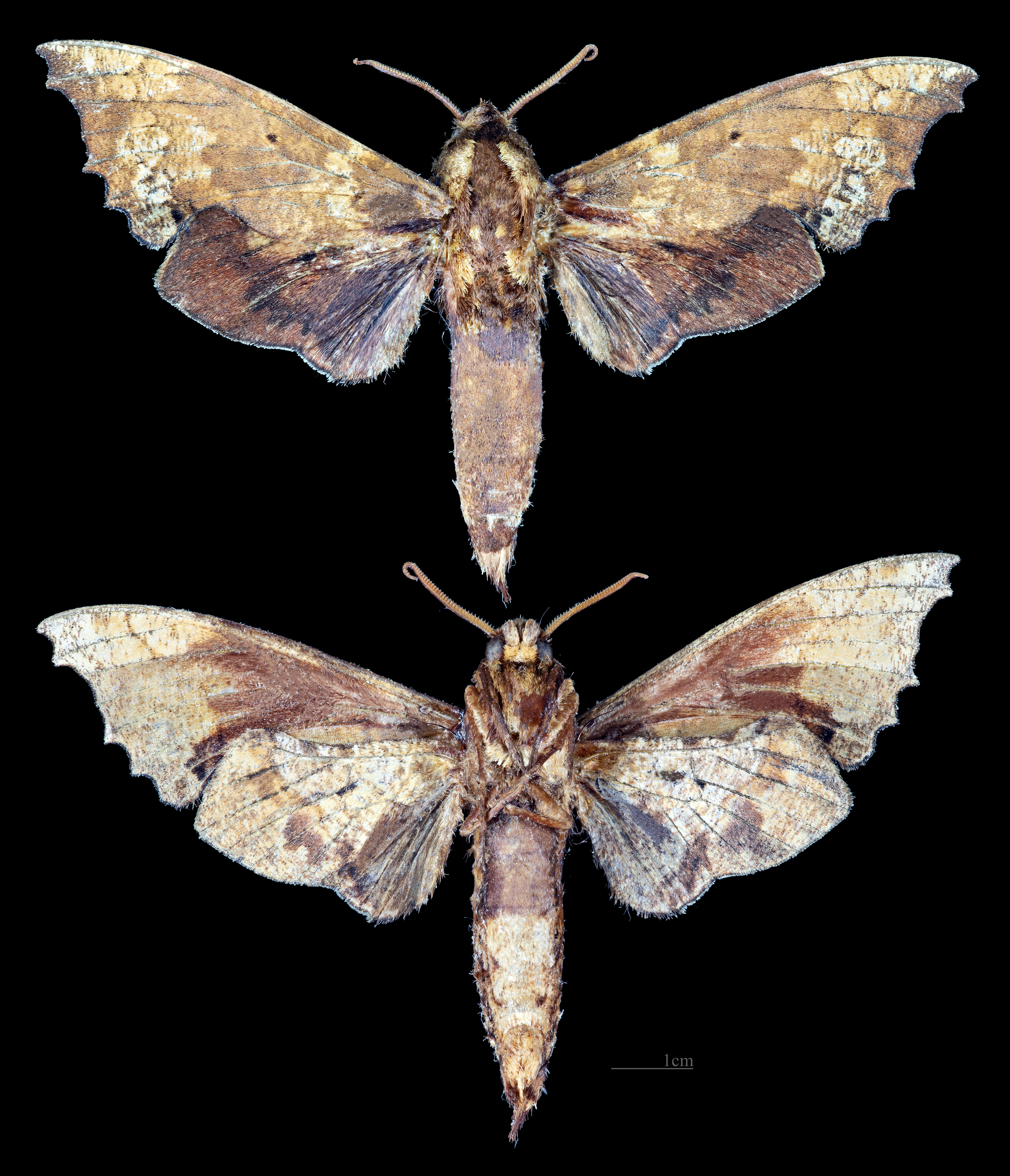
Smerinthulus

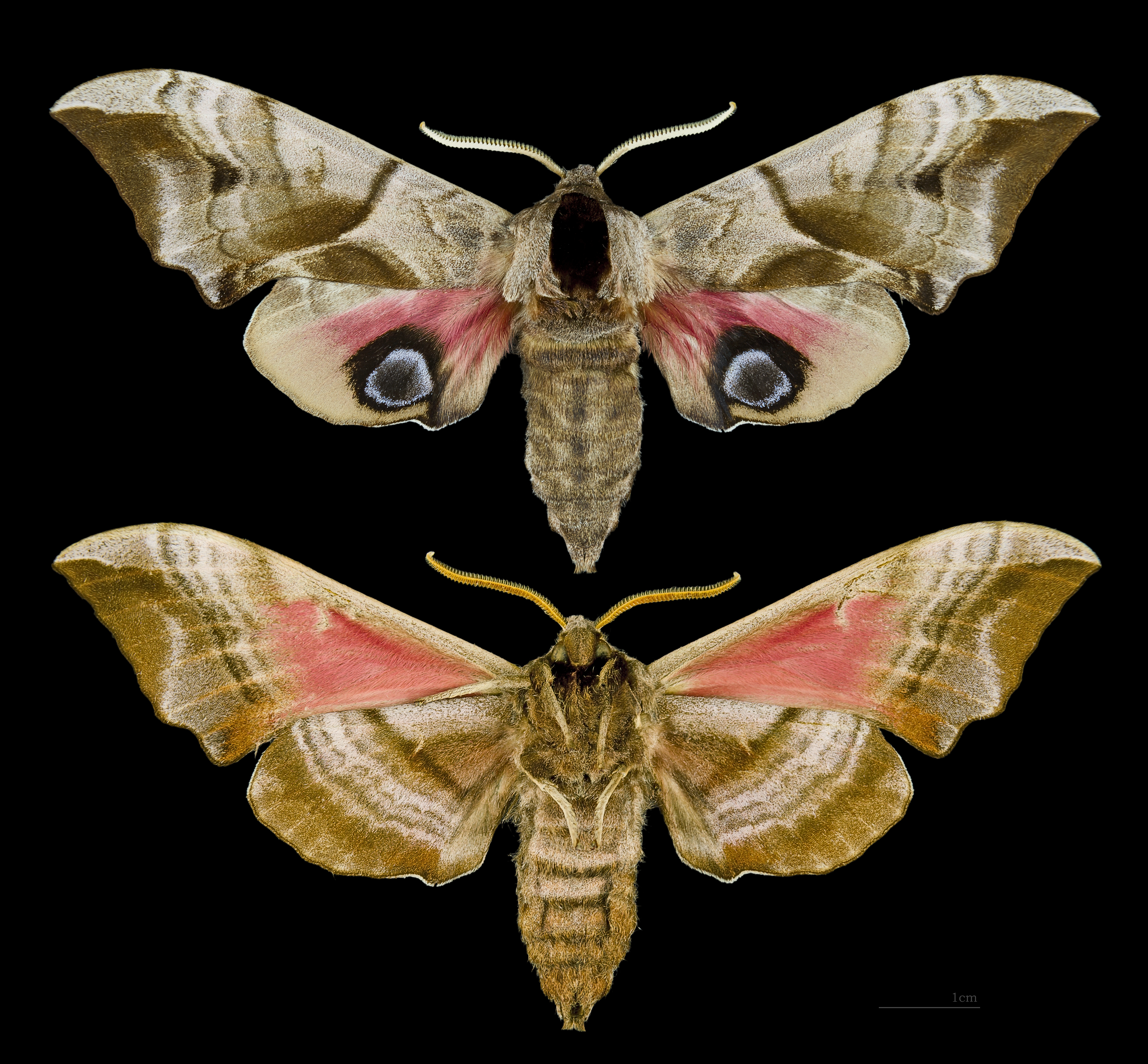
Smerinthus
