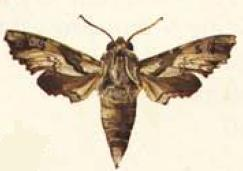

Scientific classification
- Kingdom: Animalia
- Phylum: Arthropoda
- Class: Insecta
- Order: Lepidoptera
- Family: Sphingidae
- Tribe: Smerinthini
- Genus: Polyptychopsis; Carcasson, 1968
- Species: P. marshalli

Binomial name
- Polyptychopsis marshalli (Rothschild & Jordan, 1903)

Synonyms
- Polyptychus marshalli Rothschild & Jordan, 1903; Polyptychus auriguttatus Gehlen, 1934; Polyptychus marshalli meridianus Kernbach, 1963

= Polyptychopsis =

Genus of moths

Polyptychopsis is a genus of moths in the family Sphingidae. It contains only one species, Polyptychopsis marshalli, which is known from Brachystegia woodland in large parts of Africa.

The wingspan is 53–58 mm.

== Subspecies ==
- Polyptychopsis marshalli marshalli (Zimbabwe to Malawi and south-eastern Tanzania)
- Polyptychopsis marshalli auriguttatus (Gehlen, 1934) (Democratic Republic of the Congo, south-western Tanzania and probably eastern Angola)
- Polyptychopsis marshalli meridianus (Kernbach, 1963) (Zimbabwe)
