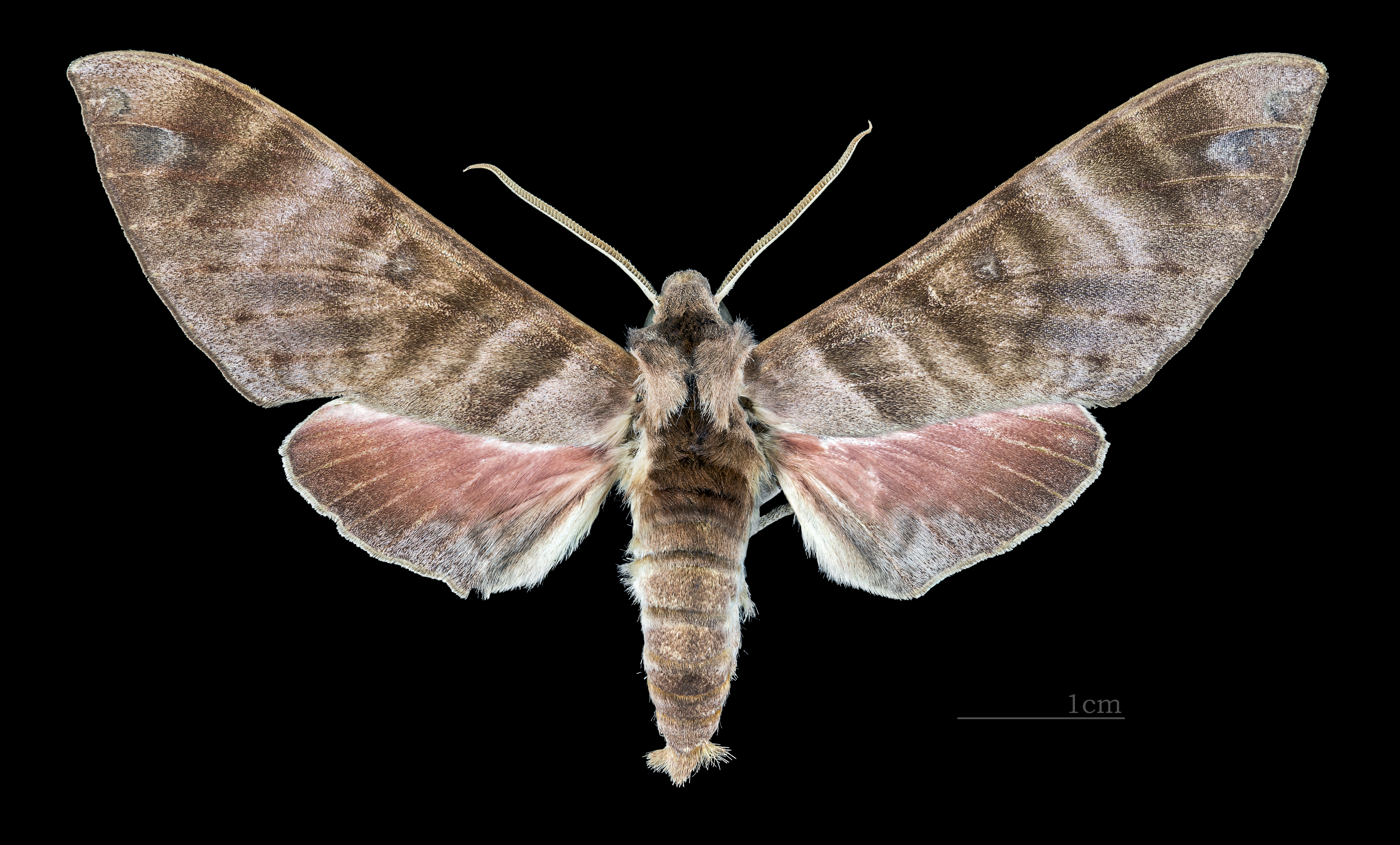
- Male Opistoclanis hawkeri, dorsal view
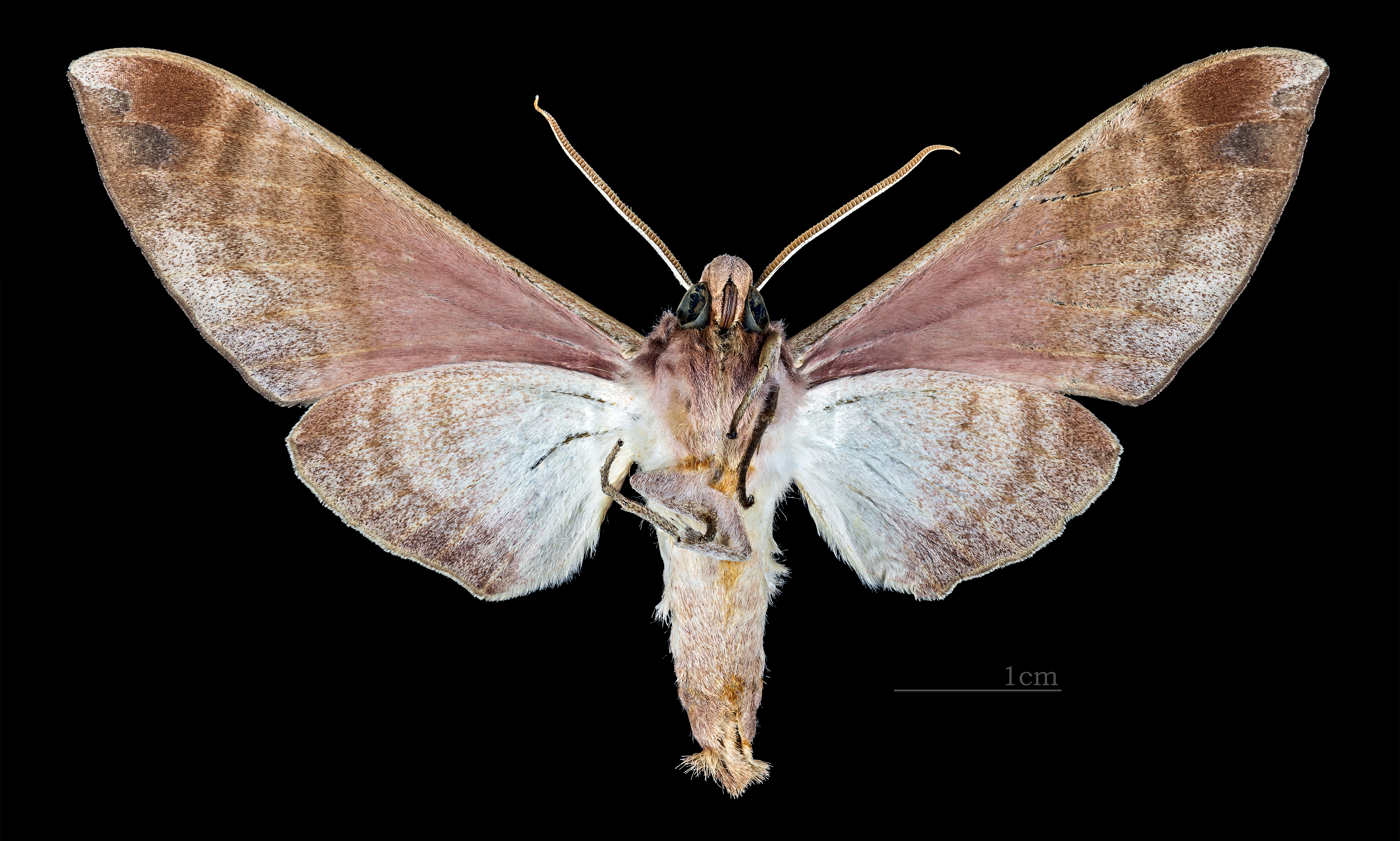
- Male Opistoclanis hawkeri, ventral view

Scientific classification
- Domain: Eukaryota
- Kingdom: Animalia
- Phylum: Arthropoda
- Class: Insecta
- Order: Lepidoptera
- Family: Sphingidae
- Tribe: Smerinthini
- Genus: Opistoclanis; Jordan, 1929
- Species: O. hawkeri

Binomial name
- Opistoclanis hawkeri (Joicey & Talbot, 1921)

Synonyms
- Clanis hawkeri Joicey & Talbot, 1921

= Opistoclanis =

Genus of moths

Opistoclanis is a genus of moths in the family Sphingidae, containing only one species Opistoclanis hawkeri.

== Distribution ==
which is known from Yunnan in China, north-eastern Thailand, Laos and northern Vietnam, where it has been recorded at elevations between 888 and 2,800 meters.

== Description ==
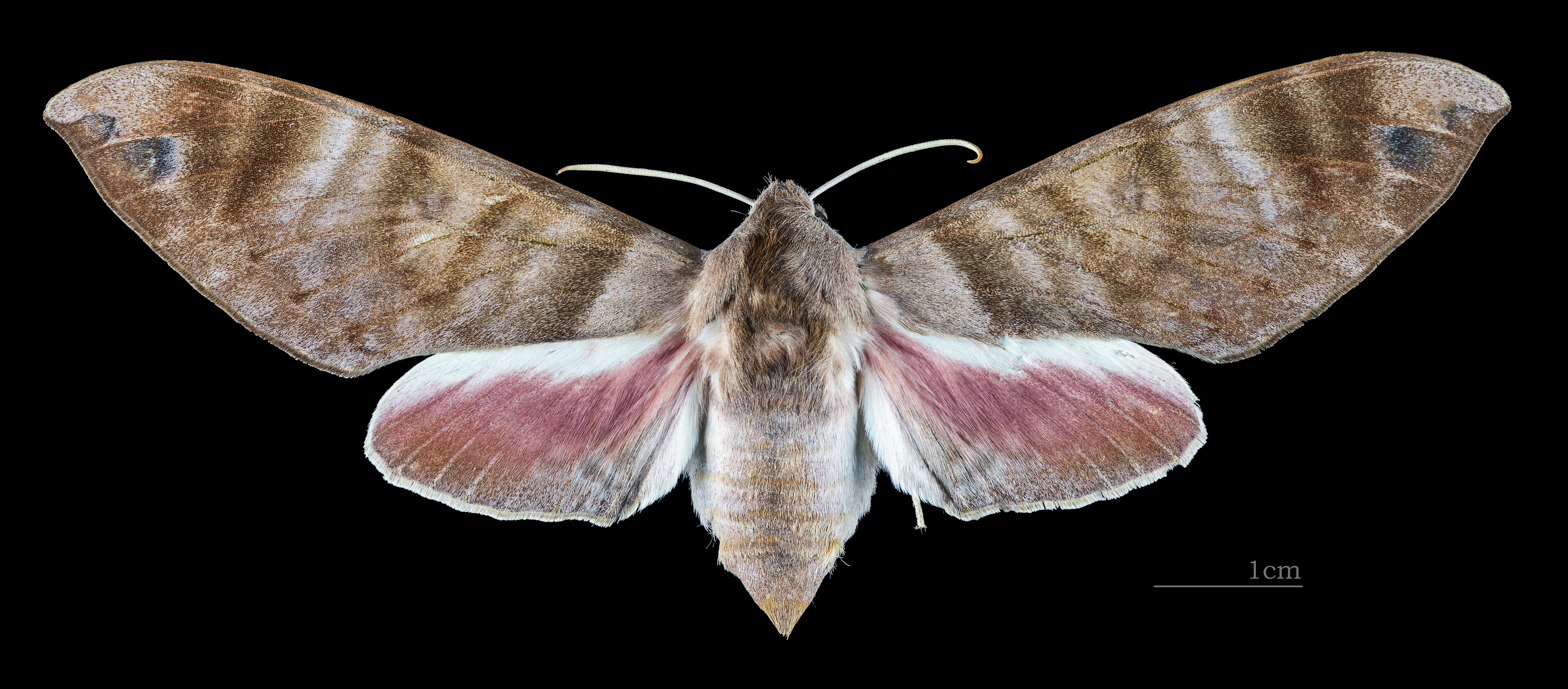
Female dorsal view

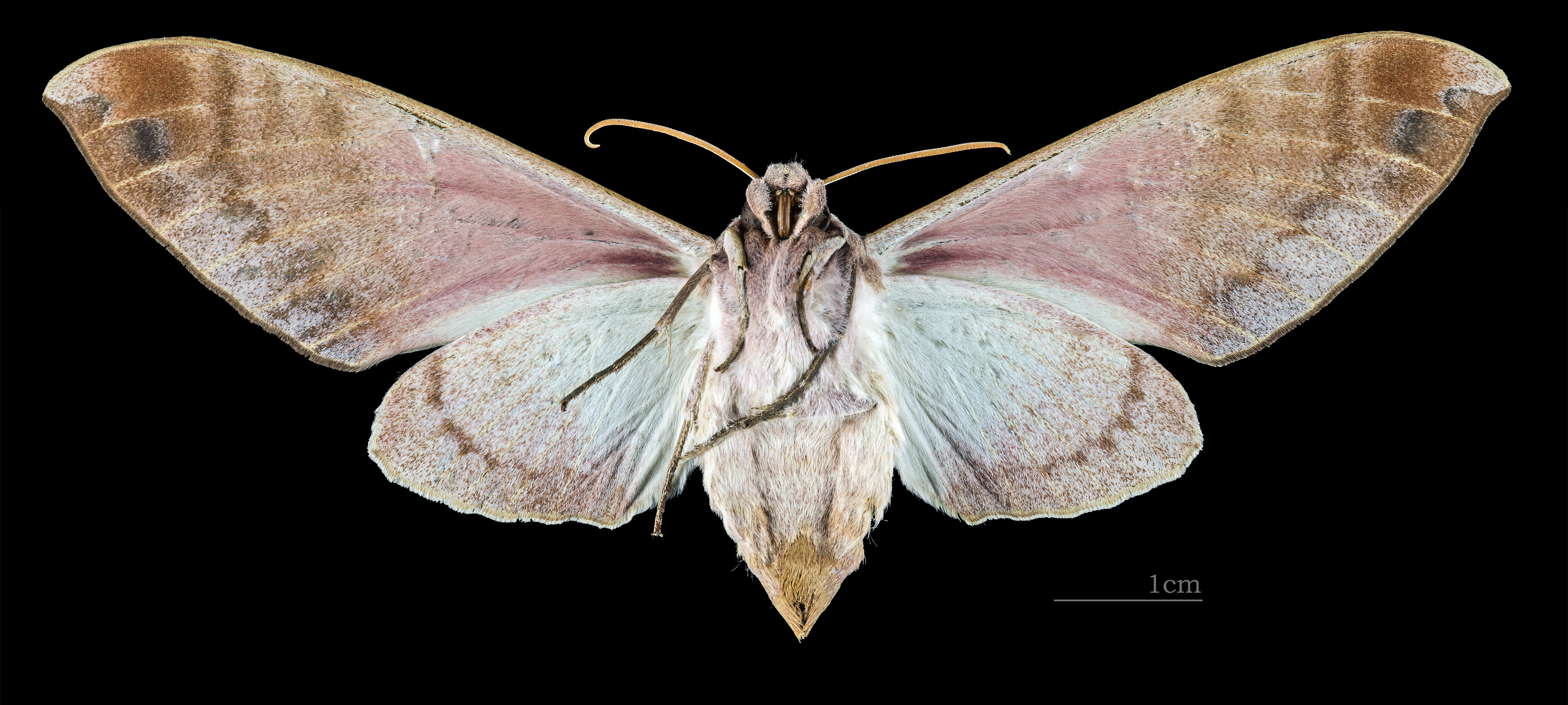
Female ventral view

== Biology ==
Adults are on wing from late March to early May at the end of the dry season in Thailand.
