= Avinoffia =

Scientific classification
- Kingdom: Animalia
- Phylum: Arthropoda
- Class: Insecta
- Order: Lepidoptera
- Family: Sphingidae
- Tribe: Smerinthini
- Genus: Avinoffia; Clark, 1929
- Species: A. hollandi

Binomial name
- Avinoffia hollandi (Clark, 1917)

Synonyms
- Lycosphingia hollandi Clark, 1916

Genus of moths

Avinoffia is a genus of moths in the family Sphingidae containing only one species, Avinoffia hollandi. It is known from Cameroon, Gabon, Congo and Liberia.
