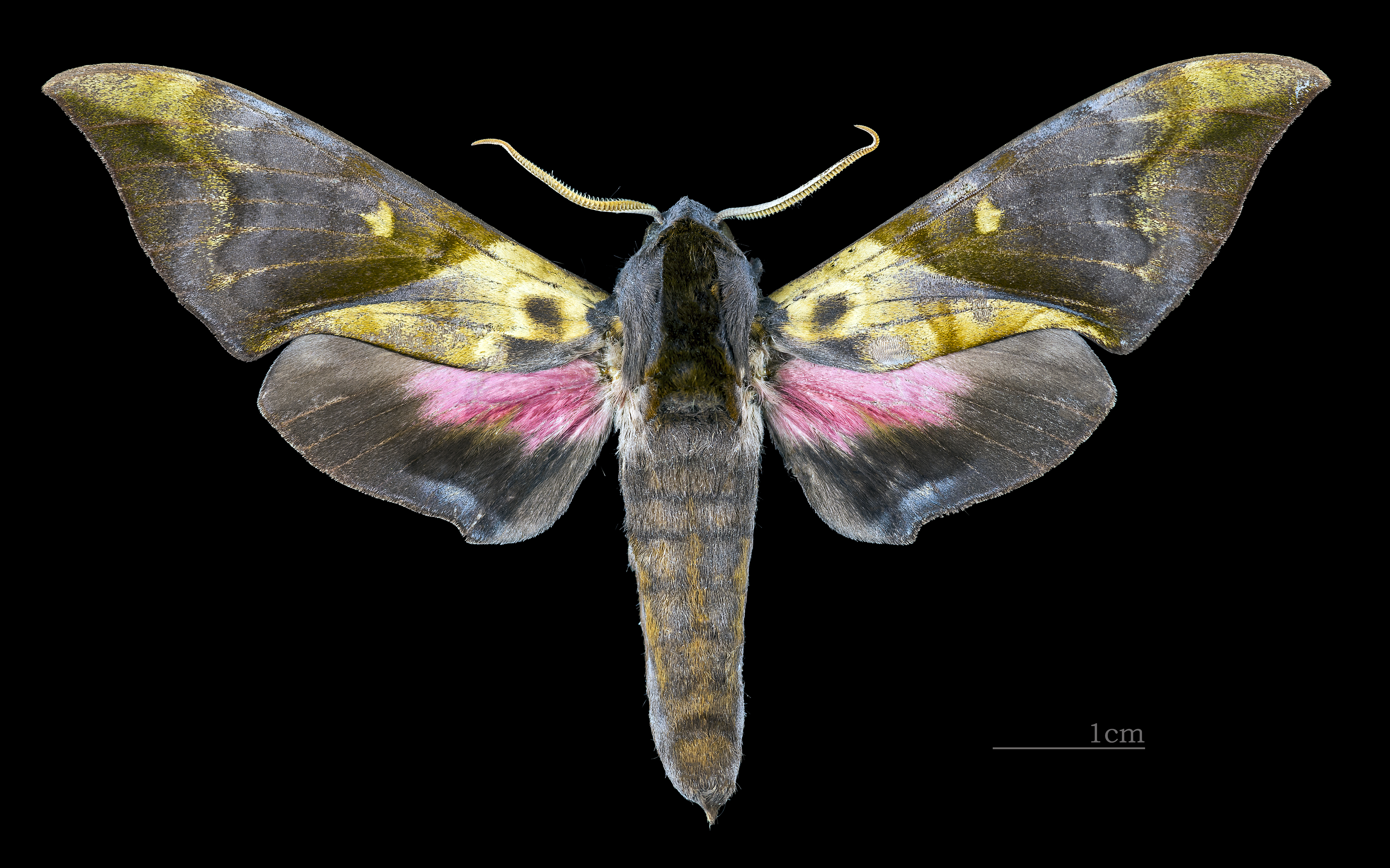
- Male dorsal
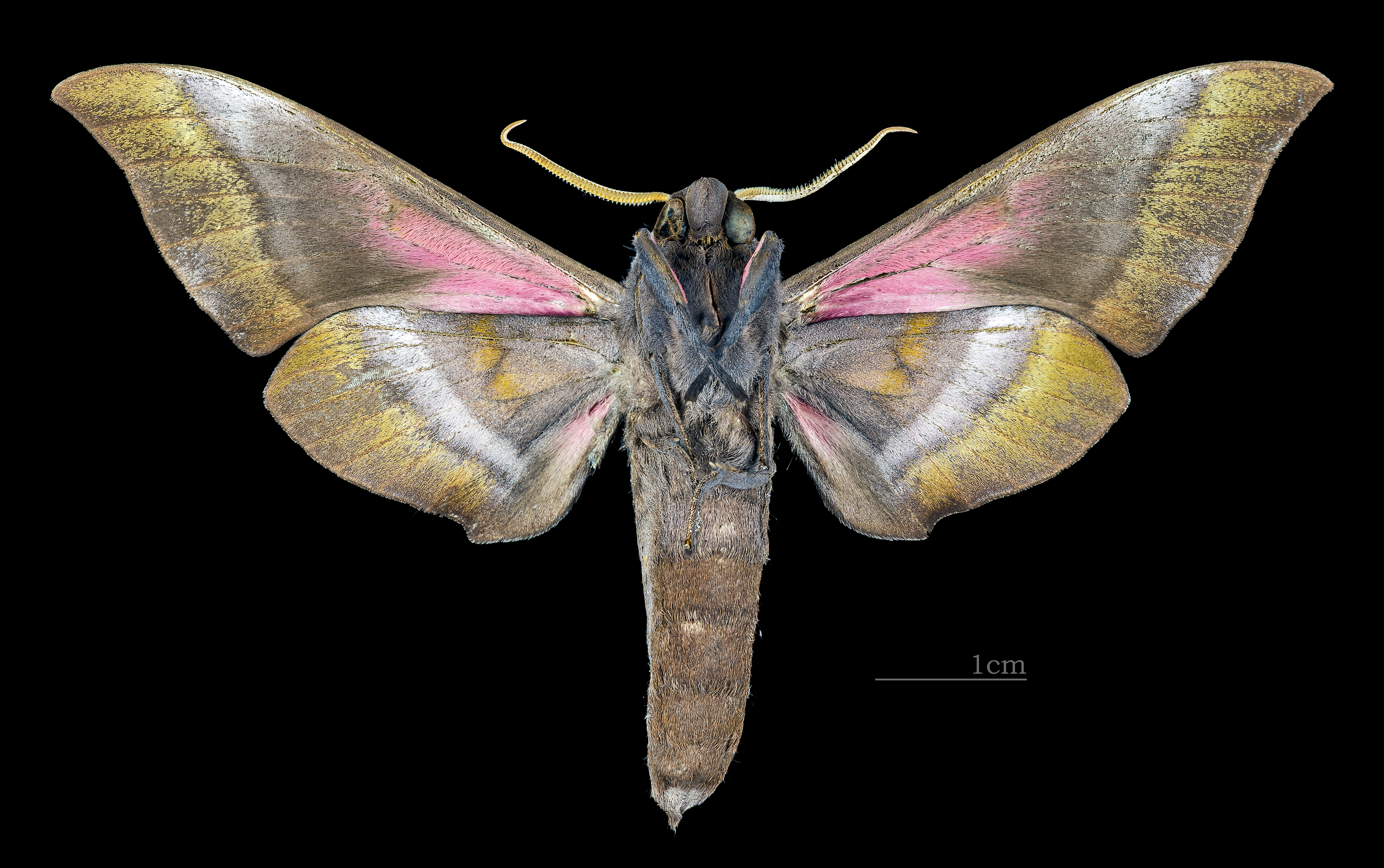
- Male ventral

Scientific classification
- Kingdom: Animalia
- Phylum: Arthropoda
- Class: Insecta
- Order: Lepidoptera
- Family: Sphingidae
- Tribe: Smerinthini
- Genus: Anambulyx; Rothschild & Jordan, 1903
- Species: A. elwesi

Binomial name
- Anambulyx elwesi (H. Druce, 1882)

Synonyms
- Ambulyx elwesi H. Druce, 1882; Anambulyx elwesi kitchingi Smetacek, 2004

= Anambulyx =

Genus of moths

Anambulyx is a monotypic moth genus in the family Sphingidae erected by Walter Rothschild and Karl Jordan in 1903. Its only species, Anambulyx elwesi, or Elwes' pink-and-green hawkmoth, was first described by Herbert Druce in 1882.

== Distribution ==
Is known from northern Pakistan, northern India, Nepal, south-western China, northern Thailand and northern Vietnam.

== Biology ==
Adults have been recorded from May to July in Thailand.
