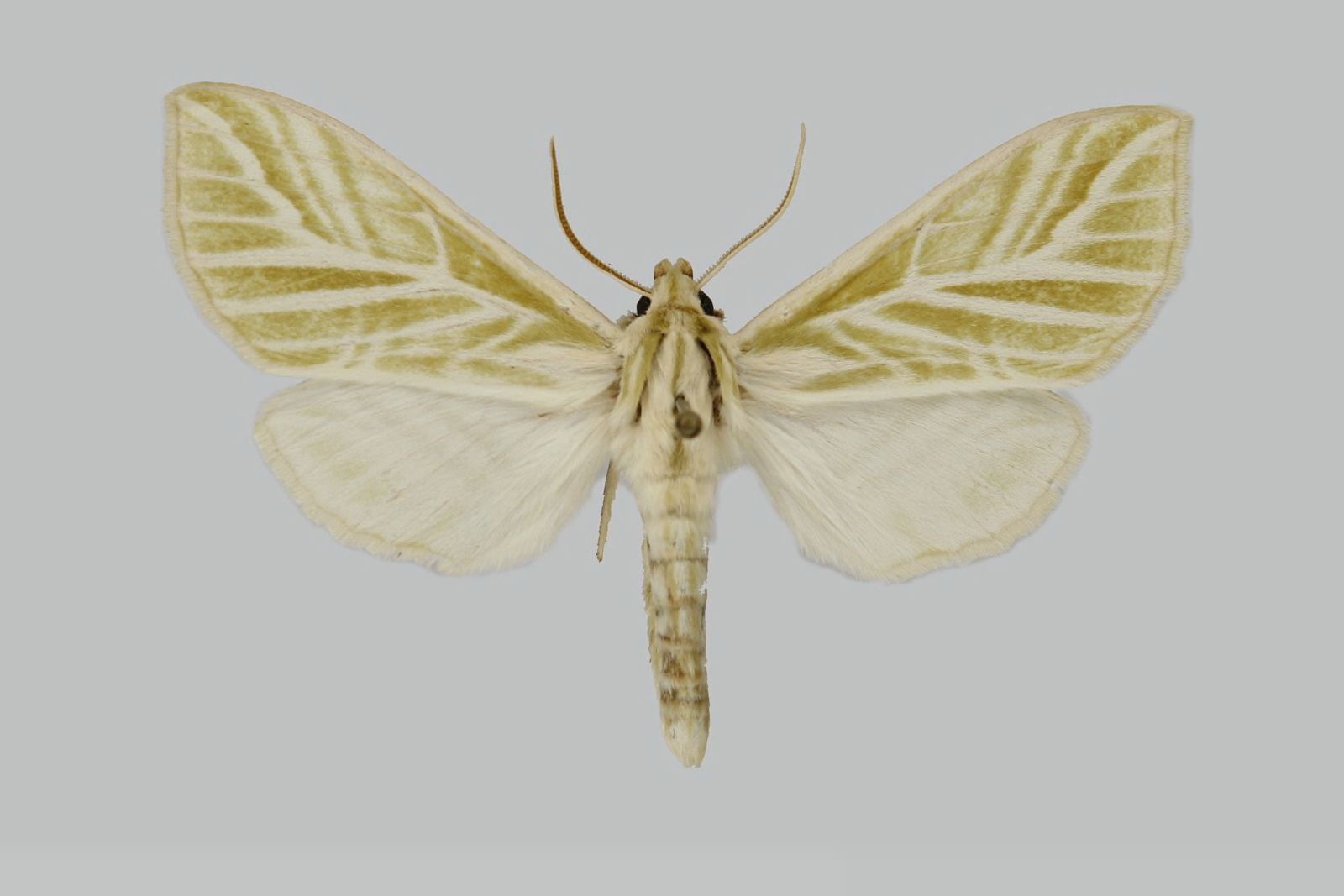
- Male

Scientific classification
- Kingdom: Animalia
- Phylum: Arthropoda
- Class: Insecta
- Order: Lepidoptera
- Family: Sphingidae
- Tribe: Smerinthini
- Genus: Viriclanis; Aarvik, 1999
- Species: V. kingstoni

Binomial name
- Viriclanis kingstoni Aarvik, 1999

= Viriclanis =

Genus of moths

Viriclanis is a genus of moths in the family Sphingidae, containing only one species, Viriclanis kingstoni, which has been recorded in Tanzania. Both the genus and the species were first described by Leif Aarvik in 1999.
