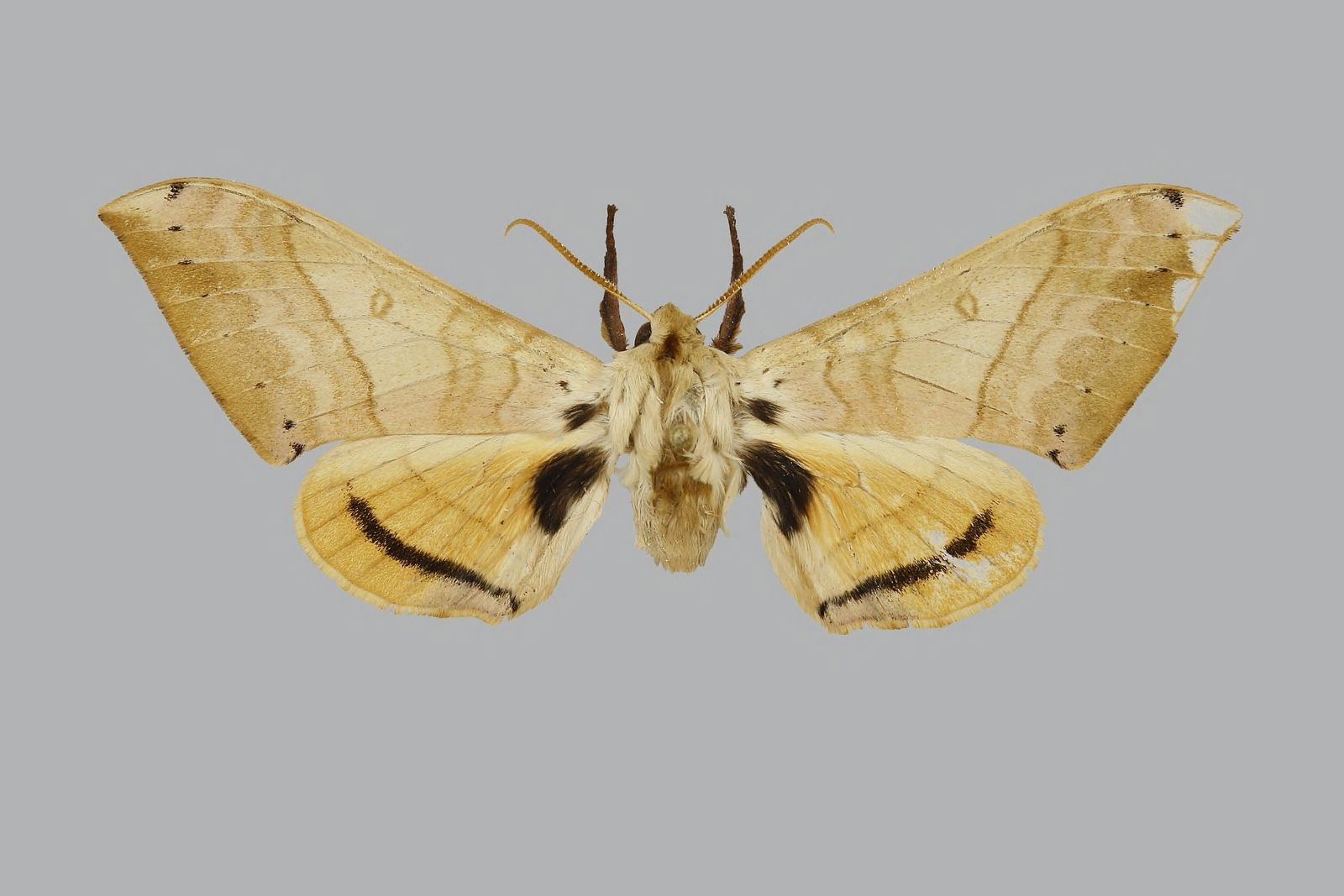
- Male

Scientific classification
- Kingdom: Animalia
- Phylum: Arthropoda
- Class: Insecta
- Order: Lepidoptera
- Family: Sphingidae
- Tribe: Smerinthini
- Genus: Cadiouclanis; Eitschberger, 2007
- Species: C. bianchii

Binomial name
- Cadiouclanis bianchii (Oberthür, 1883)

Synonyms
- Smerinthus bianchii Oberthür, 1883

= Cadiouclanis =

Genus of moths

Cadiouclanis is a genus of moths in the family Sphingidae, containing only one species, Cadiouclanis bianchii, which is known from Ethiopia.
