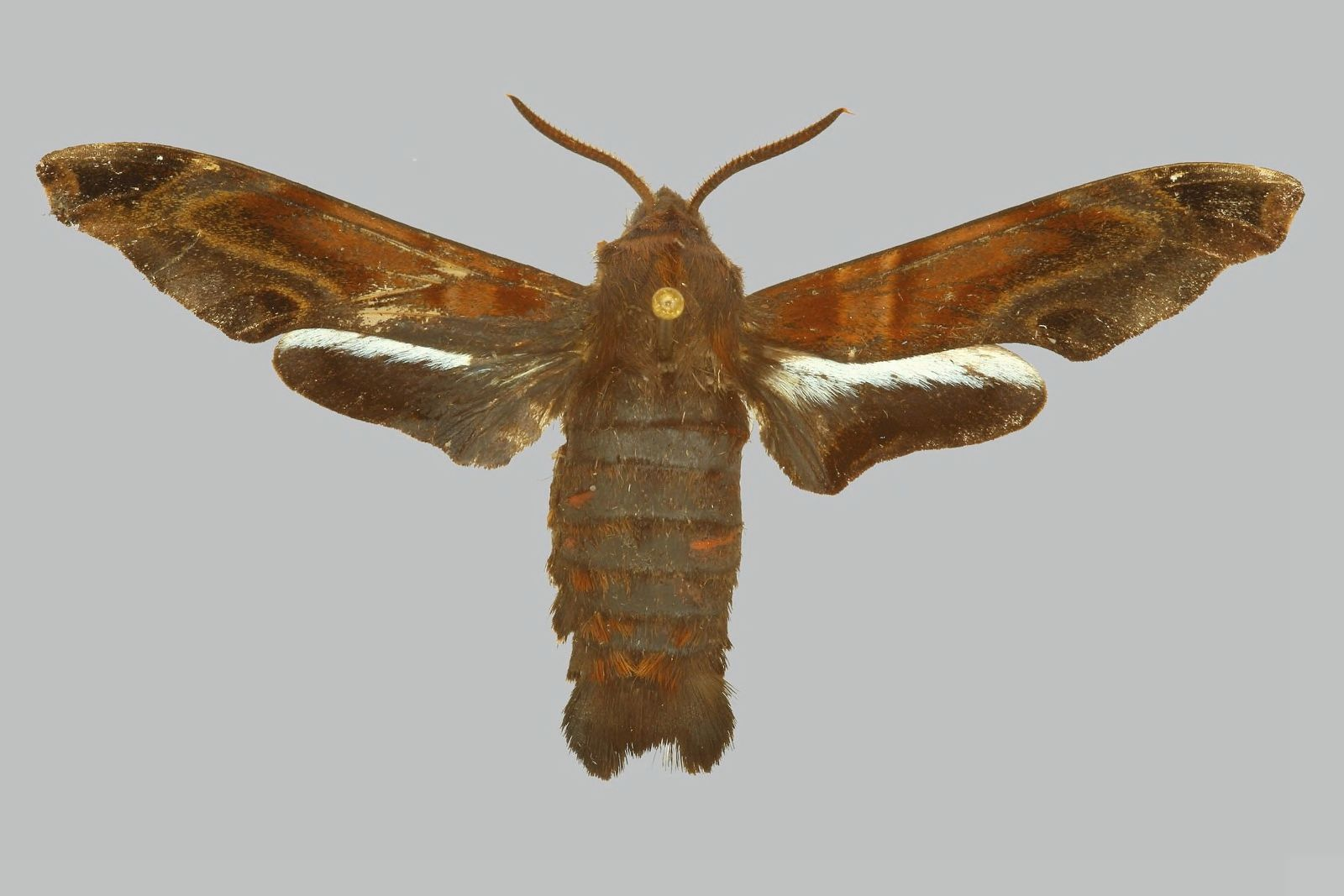

Scientific classification
- Kingdom: Animalia
- Phylum: Arthropoda
- Clade: Pancrustacea
- Class: Insecta
- Order: Lepidoptera
- Family: Sphingidae
- Tribe: Smerinthini
- Genus: Afrosataspes; Basquin & Cadiou, 1986
- Species: A. galleyi

Binomial name
- Afrosataspes galleyi (Basquin, 1982)

Synonyms
- Sataspes galleyi Basquin, 1982

= Afrosataspes =

Genus of moths

Afrosataspes is a genus of moths in the family Sphingidae, containing only one species, Afrosataspes galleyi, which is known from the Central African Republic and the Democratic Republic of the Congo.
