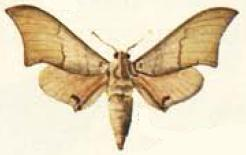

Scientific classification
- Domain: Eukaryota
- Kingdom: Animalia
- Phylum: Arthropoda
- Class: Insecta
- Order: Lepidoptera
- Family: Sphingidae
- Tribe: Smerinthini
- Genus: Xenosphingia; Jordan, 1920
- Species: X. jansei

Binomial name
- Xenosphingia jansei Jordan, 1920

= Xenosphingia =

Genus of moths

Xenosphingia is a genus of moths in the family Sphingidae, containing one species, Xenosphingia jansei, which is known from arid bush in western Zimbabwe and adjoining Botswana.

The wingspan is 54–65 mm.
