= List of moths of the Central African Republic =

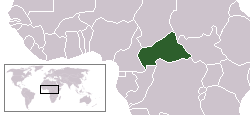
Location of the Central African Republic

There are about 240 known moth species of the Central African Republic. The moths (mostly nocturnal) and butterflies (mostly diurnal) together make up the taxonomic order Lepidoptera.

This is a list of moth species which have been recorded in the Central African Republic.

== Anomoeotidae ==
- Staphylinochrous euryperalis Hampson, 1910

== Arctiidae ==
- Alpenus maculosa (Stoll, 1781)
- Alpenus nigropunctata (Bethune-Baker, 1908)
- Alpenus thomasi Watson, 1988
- Amerila atrivena (Hampson, 1907)
- Amsacta latimarginalis Rothschild, 1933
- Balacra nigripennis (Aurivillius, 1904)
- Creatonotos leucanioides Holland, 1893
- Cyana rufeola Karisch & Dall'Asta, 2010
- Spilosoma jordani Debauche, 1938
- Spilosoma togoensis Bartel, 1903

== Autostichidae ==
- Neospastus ubangi Gozmány, 1966

== Drepanidae ==
- Callidrepana macnultyi Watson, 1965
- Callidrepana serena Watson, 1965
- Epicampoptera andersoni (Tams, 1925)
- Epicampoptera marantica (Tams, 1930)
- Epicampoptera strandi Bryk, 1913
- Isospidia angustipennis (Warren, 1904)
- Negera natalensis (Felder, 1874)
- Spidia rufinota Watson, 1965
- Uranometra oculata (Holland, 1893)

== Eupterotidae ==
- Phiala pseudatomaria Strand, 1911
- Stenoglene brunneofasciata Dall'Asta & Poncin, 1980
- Stenoglene citrinus (Druce, 1886)
- Stenoglene dehanicus (Strand, 1911)
- Stenoglene plagiatus (Aurivillius, 1911)
- Stenoglene preussi (Aurivillius, 1893)
- Stenoglene pujoli Dall'Asta & Poncin, 1980
- Stenoglene sulphureotinctus Strand, 1912
- Stenoglene thelda (Druce, 1887)
- Stenoglene uelei Dall'Asta & Poncin, 1980
- Stenoglene uniformis Dall'Asta & Poncin, 1980

== Geometridae ==
- Cleora rostella D. S. Fletcher, 1967
- Colocleora linearis Herbulot, 1985
- Miantochora picturata Herbulot, 1985
- Miantochora subcaudata Herbulot, 1981
- Racotis squalida (Butler, 1878)
- Racotis zebrina Warren, 1899
- Zamarada adumbrata D. S. Fletcher, 1974
- Zamarada auratisquama Warren, 1897
- Zamarada bicuspida D. S. Fletcher, 1974
- Zamarada corroborata Herbulot, 1954
- Zamarada cydippe Herbulot, 1954
- Zamarada dentigera Warren, 1909
- Zamarada differens Bastelberger, 1907
- Zamarada dilata D. S. Fletcher, 1974
- Zamarada dolorosa D. S. Fletcher, 1974
- Zamarada enippe Prout, 1921
- Zamarada excavata Bethune-Baker, 1913
- Zamarada latimargo Warren, 1897
- Zamarada melpomene Oberthür, 1912
- Zamarada modesta Herbulot, 1985
- Zamarada nasuta Warren, 1897
- Zamarada protrusa Warren, 1897

== Gracillariidae ==
- Stomphastis thraustica (Meyrick, 1908)

== Himantopteridae ==
- Pedoptila ubangiana Schultze, 1931

== Lasiocampidae ==
- Cheligium ufo Zolotuhin & Gurkovich, 2009
- Filiola dogma Zolotuhin & Gurkovich, 2009
- Muzunguja rectilineata (Aurivillius, 1900)
- Odontocheilopteryx maculata Aurivillius, 1905
- Odontocheilopteryx phoneus Hering, 1928
- Pachytrina elygara Zolotuhin & Gurkovich, 2009

== Lymantriidae ==
- Dasychira pseudosatanas Hering, 1926
- Dasychira scotina Hering, 1926
- Dasychira taberna Hering, 1926
- Dasychira torniplaga Hering, 1926
- Laelia gigantea Hampson, 1910
- Laelia pluto (Hering, 1926)
- Stracena promelaena (Holland, 1893)

== Metarbelidae ==
- Haberlandia annetteae Lehmann, 2011
- Haberlandia odzalaensis Lehmann, 2011
- Moyencharia mineti Lehmann, 2013
- Moyencharia winteri Lehmann, 2013

== Noctuidae ==
- Achaea rothkirchi (Strand, 1914)
- Acontia citrelinea Bethune-Baker, 1911
- Aegocera rectilinea Boisduval, 1836
- Masalia flavistrigata (Hampson, 1903)
- Masalia galatheae (Wallengren, 1856)
- Masalia rubristria (Hampson, 1903)
- Mitrophrys menete (Cramer, 1775)
- Thiacidas schausi (Hampson, 1905)

== Notodontidae ==
- Atrasana pujoli Kiriakoff, 1964

== Psychidae ==
- Eumeta rotunda Bourgogne, 1965

== Saturniidae ==
- Gonimbrasia alcestris (Weymer, 1907)
- Ludia orinoptena Karsch, 1892
- Melanocera pujoli Lemaire & Rougeot, 1974
- Micragone agathylla (Westwood, 1849)
- Nudaurelia eblis Strecker, 1876

== Sphingidae ==
- Acanthosphinx guessfeldti (Dewitz, 1879)
- Acherontia atropos (Linnaeus, 1758)
- Afrosataspes galleyi (Basquin, 1982)
- Andriasa contraria Walker, 1856
- Antinephele achlora Holland, 1893
- Antinephele camerounensis Clark, 1937
- Antinephele maculifera Holland, 1889
- Antinephele marcida Holland, 1893
- Atemnora westermannii (Boisduval, 1875)
- Basiothia charis (Boisduval, 1875)
- Basiothia medea (Fabricius, 1781)
- Centroctena rutherfordi (Druce, 1882)
- Cephonodes hylas (Linnaeus, 1771)
- Ceridia heuglini (C. & R. Felder, 1874)
- Chloroclanis virescens (Butler, 1882)
- Coelonia fulvinotata (Butler, 1875)
- Daphnis nerii (Linnaeus, 1758)
- Euchloron megaera (Linnaeus, 1758)
- Falcatula cymatodes (Rothschild & Jordan, 1912)
- Falcatula falcata (Rothschild & Jordan, 1903)
- Hippotion aporodes Rothschild & Jordan, 1912
- Hippotion balsaminae (Walker, 1856)
- Hippotion celerio (Linnaeus, 1758)
- Hippotion eson (Cramer, 1779)
- Hippotion irregularis (Walker, 1856)
- Hippotion osiris (Dalman, 1823)
- Hypaedalea butleri Rothschild, 1894
- Leucophlebia afra Karsch, 1891
- Leucostrophus commasiae (Walker, 1856)
- Lophostethus dumolinii (Angas, 1849)
- Lycosphingia hamatus (Dewitz, 1879)
- Macroglossum trochilus (Hübner, 1823)
- Macropoliana natalensis (Butler, 1875)
- Neopolyptychus centralis Basquin & Pierre, 2005
- Neopolyptychus consimilis (Rothschild & Jordan, 1903)
- Neopolyptychus prionites (Rothschild & Jordan, 1916)
- Neopolyptychus serrator (Jordan, 1929)
- Nephele accentifera (Palisot de Beauvois, 1821)
- Nephele aequivalens (Walker, 1856)
- Nephele bipartita Butler, 1878
- Nephele comma Hopffer, 1857
- Nephele discifera Karsch, 1891
- Nephele funebris (Fabricius, 1793)
- Nephele maculosa Rothschild & Jordan, 1903
- Nephele oenopion (Hübner, [1824])
- Nephele peneus (Cramer, 1776)
- Nephele rectangulata Rothschild, 1895
- Nephele rosae Butler, 1875
- Pantophaea jordani (Joicey & Talbot, 1916)
- Phylloxiphia bicolor (Rothschild, 1894)
- Phylloxiphia formosa (Schultze, 1914)
- Phylloxiphia goodii (Holland, 1889)
- Phylloxiphia illustris (Rothschild & Jordan, 1906)
- Phylloxiphia oberthueri (Rothschild & Jordan, 1903)
- Phylloxiphia oweni (Carcasson, 1968)
- Phylloxiphia vicina (Rothschild & Jordan, 1915)
- Platysphinx constrigilis (Walker, 1869)
- Platysphinx phyllis Rothschild & Jordan, 1903
- Platysphinx stigmatica (Mabille, 1878)
- Platysphinx vicaria Jordan, 1920
- Poliana buchholzi (Plötz, 1880)
- Polyptychoides digitatus (Karsch, 1891)
- Polyptychus affinis Rothschild & Jordan, 1903
- Polyptychus andosa Walker, 1856
- Polyptychus anochus Rothschild & Jordan, 1906
- Polyptychus bernardii Rougeot, 1966
- Polyptychus carteri (Butler, 1882)
- Polyptychus coryndoni Rothschild & Jordan, 1903
- Polyptychus enodia (Holland, 1889)
- Polyptychus herbuloti Darge, 1990
- Polyptychus hollandi Rothschild & Jordan, 1903
- Polyptychus murinus Rothschild, 1904
- Polyptychus orthographus Rothschild & Jordan, 1903
- Polyptychus paupercula (Holland, 1889)
- Polyptychus thihongae Bernardi, 1970
- Polyptychus trisecta (Aurivillius, 1901)
- Pseudenyo benitensis Holland, 1889
- Pseudoclanis admatha Pierre, 1985
- Pseudoclanis molitor (Rothschild & Jordan, 1912)
- Pseudoclanis occidentalis Rothschild & Jordan, 1903
- Pseudoclanis rhadamistus (Fabricius, 1781)
- Rhadinopasa hornimani (Druce, 1880)
- Rufoclanis rosea (Druce, 1882)
- Temnora camerounensis Clark, 1923
- Temnora crenulata (Holland, 1893)
- Temnora curtula Rothschild & Jordan, 1908
- Temnora elegans (Rothschild, 1895)
- Temnora elisabethae Hering, 1930
- Temnora eranga (Holland, 1889)
- Temnora fumosa (Walker, 1856)
- Temnora funebris (Holland, 1893)
- Temnora griseata Rothschild & Jordan, 1903
- Temnora iapygoides (Holland, 1889)
- Temnora livida (Holland, 1889)
- Temnora radiata (Karsch, 1892)
- Temnora sardanus (Walker, 1856)
- Temnora scitula (Holland, 1889)
- Temnora spiritus (Holland, 1893)
- Temnora stevensi Rothschild & Jordan, 1903
- Temnora wollastoni Rothschild & Jordan, 1908
- Theretra jugurtha (Boisduval, 1875)
- Theretra orpheus (Herrich-Schäffer, 1854)
- Theretra perkeo Rothschild & Jordan, 1903
- Xanthopan morganii (Walker, 1856)

== Tineidae ==
- Acridotarsa melipecta (Meyrick, 1915)
- Ceratophaga vastellus (Zeller, 1852)
- Cubitofusa pseudoglebata (Gozmány, 1967)
- Ectabola protracta Gozmány, 1966
- Hapsifera refalcata Gozmány, 1967
- Hyperbola primoti Gozmány, 1966
- Hyperbola zicsii Gozmány, 1965
- Miramonopis viettei Gozmány, 1966
- Monopis addenda Gozmány, 1965
- Monopis immaculata Gozmány, 1967
- Monopis meyricki Gozmány, 1967
- Monopis rejectella (Walker, 1864)
- Nannotinea simplex Gozmány, 1966
- Pachypsaltis morosa Gozmány, 1966
- Perissomastix breviberbis (Meyrick, 1933)
- Perissomastix idolatrix Gozmány & Vári, 1973
- Perissomastix onyx Gozmány, 1966
- Phereoeca postulata Gozmány, 1967
- Pitharcha latriodes (Meyrick, 1917)
- Setomorpha rutella Zeller, 1852
- Sphallestasis truncata (Gozmány, 1966)
- Syncalipsis optania (Meyrick, 1908)
- Trichophaga abruptella (Wollaston, 1858)

== Zygaenidae ==
- Saliunca meruana Aurivillius, 1910
