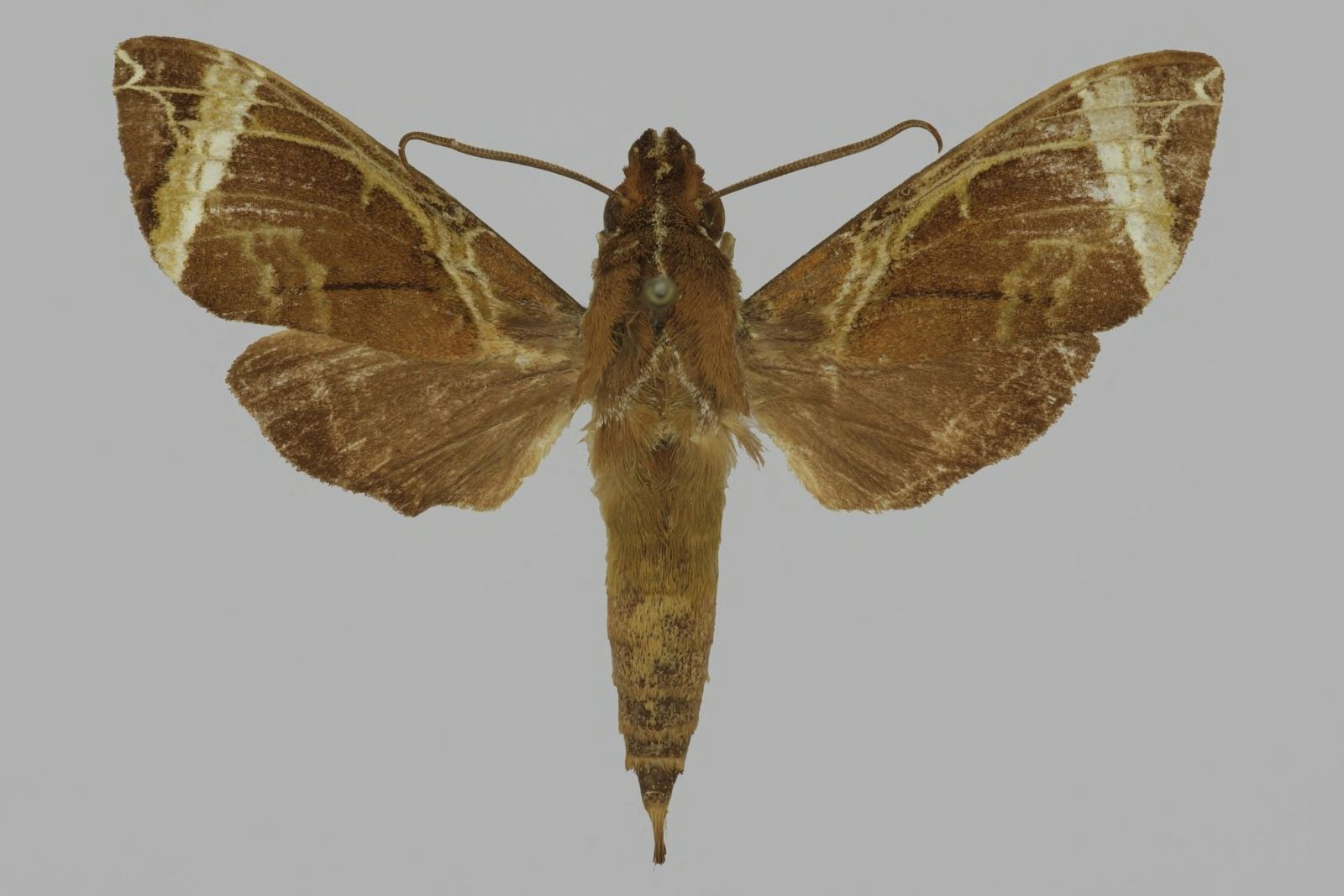
- Male, collected in Ivory Coast

Scientific classification
- Domain: Eukaryota
- Kingdom: Animalia
- Phylum: Arthropoda
- Class: Insecta
- Order: Lepidoptera
- Family: Sphingidae
- Genus: Antinephele
- Species: A. anomala

Binomial name
- Antinephele anomala (Butler, 1882)

Synonyms
- Nephele anomala Butler, 1882

= Antinephele anomala =

Species of moth

Antinephele anomala is a moth of the family Sphingidae. It was described by Arthur Gardiner Butler in 1882 and is known from Ivory Coast and Nigeria. It is considered most similar to Antinephele achlora.
