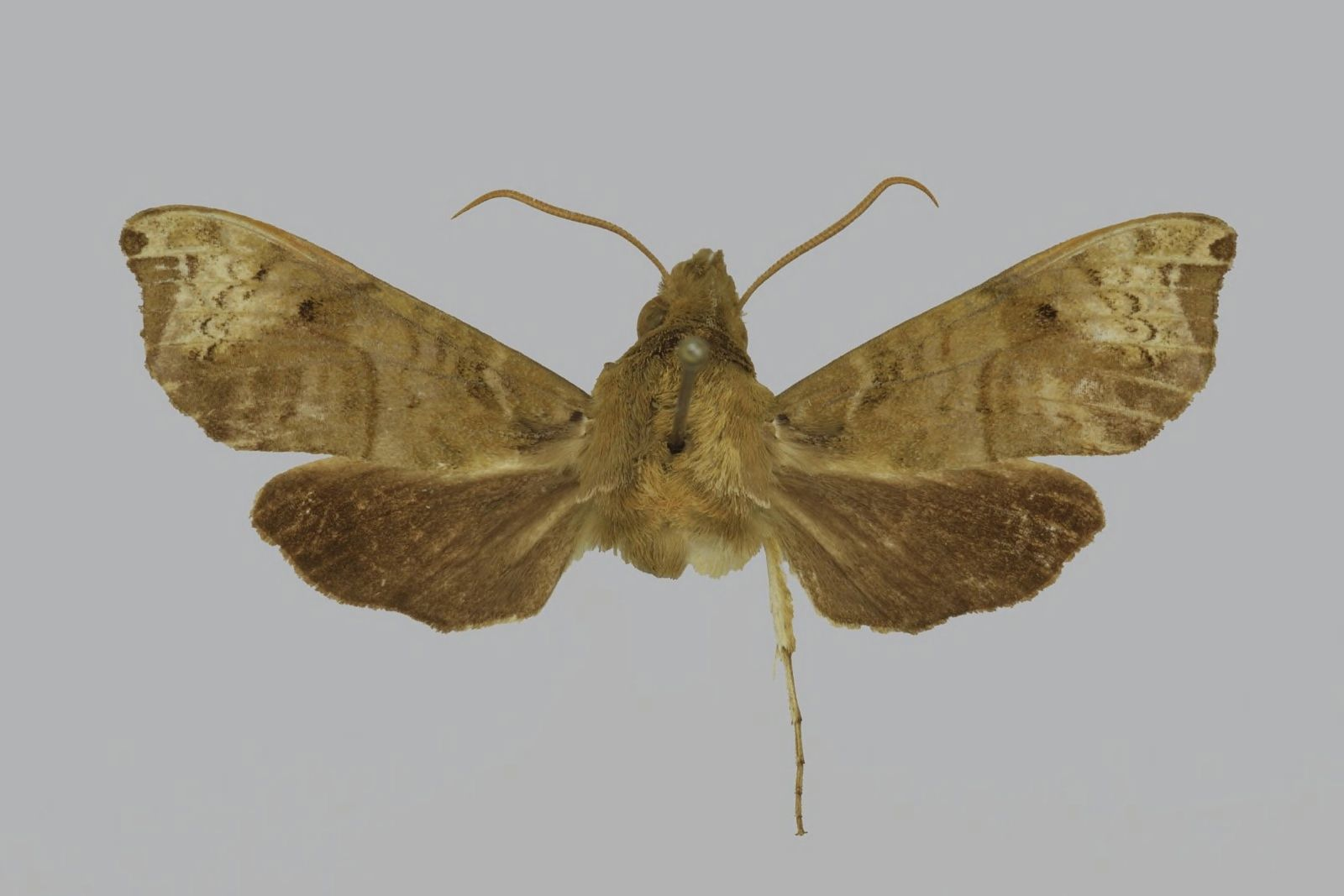
- An incomplete male specimen

Scientific classification
- Kingdom: Animalia
- Phylum: Arthropoda
- Class: Insecta
- Order: Lepidoptera
- Family: Sphingidae
- Genus: Antinephele
- Species: A. lunulata

Binomial name
- Antinephele lunulata Rothschild & Jordan, 1903

Synonyms
- Antinephele weberi Clark, 1923

= Antinephele lunulata =

Species of moth

Antinephele lunulata is a moth of the family Sphingidae. It was described by Rothschild and Jordan in 1903, and is known from forests and wooded habitats from Sierra Leone to Cameroon, the Democratic Republic of the Congo, Zambia, Zimbabwe and Tanzania, as well as Madagascar.

== Subspecies ==
- Antinephele lunulata lunulata
- Antinephele lunulata turlini - Darge, 1972 (Madagascar)
