= Alpenus investigatorum =

Scientific classification
- Domain: Eukaryota
- Kingdom: Animalia
- Phylum: Arthropoda
- Class: Insecta
- Order: Lepidoptera
- Superfamily: Noctuoidea
- Family: Erebidae
- Subfamily: Arctiinae
- Genus: Alpenus
- Species: A. investigatorum

Binomial name
- Alpenus investigatorum (Karsch, 1898)

Synonyms
- Spilosoma investigatorum Karsch, 1898; Spilosoma cribraria Bartel, 1903; Spilosoma mhondana Bartel, 1903; Alpenus cribraria (Bartel, 1903); Alpenus mhondana (Bartel, 1903); Diacrisia investigatorum ab. extrema Dufrane, 1953

Species of moth

Alpenus investigatorum is a moth of the family Erebidae. It was described by Ferdinand Karsch in 1898. It is found in Ethiopia, Somalia, Kenya, Uganda, Tanzania, Mozambique, Malawi, Angola and Ghana.

The larvae feed on Begonia, Carica papaya, Commelina, Aster, Bidens pilosa, Cosmos, Dahlia, Galinsoga parviflora, Zinnia, Ipomoea batatas, Brassica oleracea, Ricinus, Zea mays, Gossypium, Morus, Boerhavia, Arachis hypogaea, Russelia juncea and Nicotiana tabacum.
