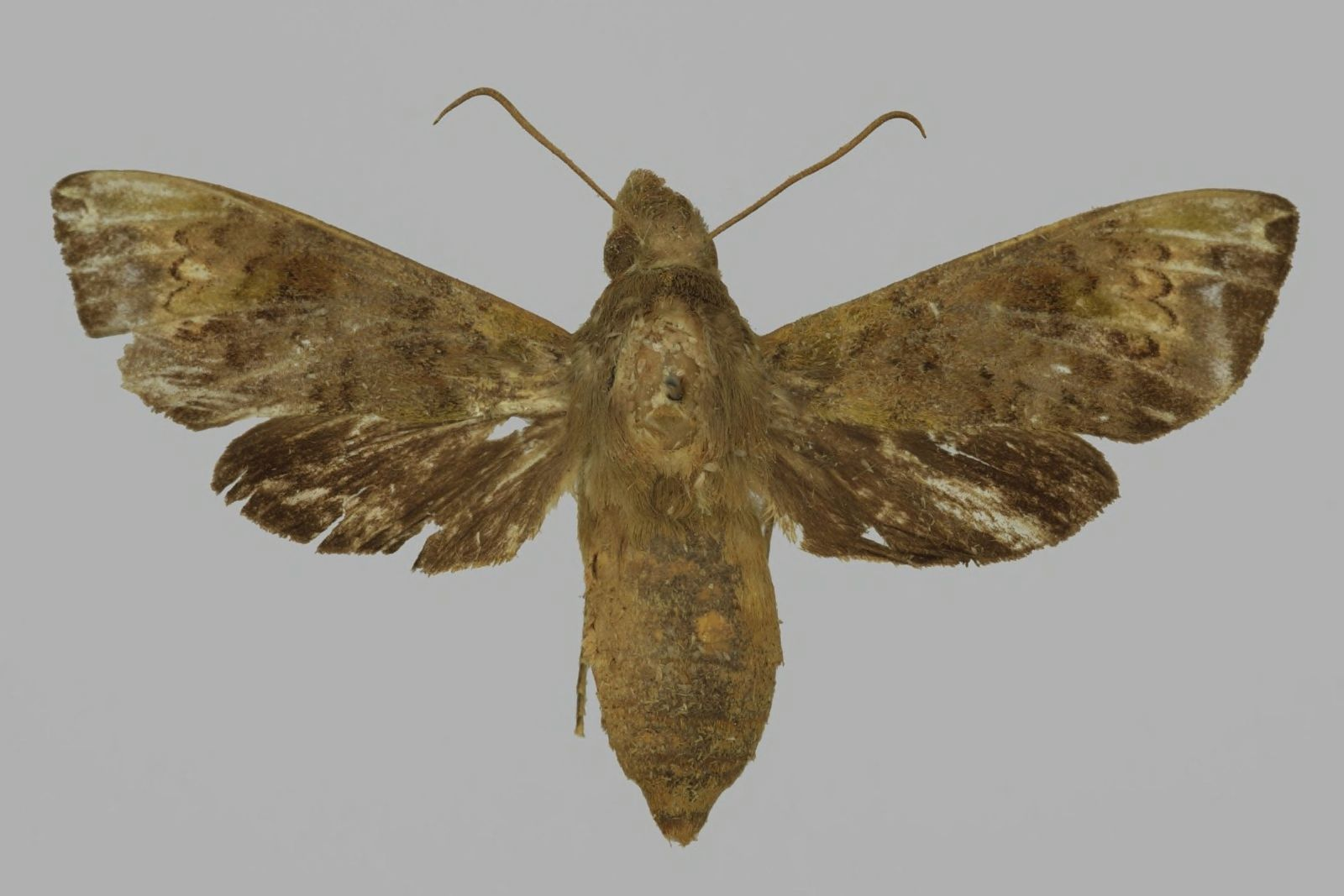
- Female, collected in Lolo, Cameroon

Scientific classification
- Kingdom: Animalia
- Phylum: Arthropoda
- Class: Insecta
- Order: Lepidoptera
- Family: Sphingidae
- Genus: Antinephele
- Species: A. efulani

Binomial name
- Antinephele efulani Clark, 1926

= Antinephele efulani =

Species of moth

Antinephele efulani is a moth of the family Sphingidae. It was described by Benjamin Preston Clark in 1926 and is known from the Democratic Republic of the Congo, Gabon and Cameroon.

The costal margin of the forewing upperside is apically shaded with green. There is a mid-brown semi-lunar patch on the outer margin bordered basally by a series of four irregularly sagittate (arrowhead-shaped) bluish-white markings.
