= Donaspastus bosellii =

Scientific classification
- Domain: Eukaryota
- Kingdom: Animalia
- Phylum: Arthropoda
- Class: Insecta
- Order: Lepidoptera
- Family: Autostichidae
- Genus: Donaspastus
- Species: D. bosellii

Binomial name
- Donaspastus bosellii (Hartig, 1941)

Synonyms
- Symmoca bosellii Hartig, 1941

Species of moth

Donaspastus bosellii is a moth of the family Autostichidae. It is found on Sardinia.
