= Stenoglene citrinoides =

Scientific classification
- Kingdom: Animalia
- Phylum: Arthropoda
- Clade: Pancrustacea
- Class: Insecta
- Order: Lepidoptera
- Family: Eupterotidae
- Genus: Stenoglene
- Species: S. citrinoides

Binomial name
- Stenoglene citrinoides Dall'Asta & Poncin, 1980

Species of moth

Stenoglene citrinoides is a moth in the family Eupterotidae. It was described by Ugo Dall'Asta and G. Poncin in 1980. It is found in the former Orientale Province of the Democratic Republic of the Congo.
