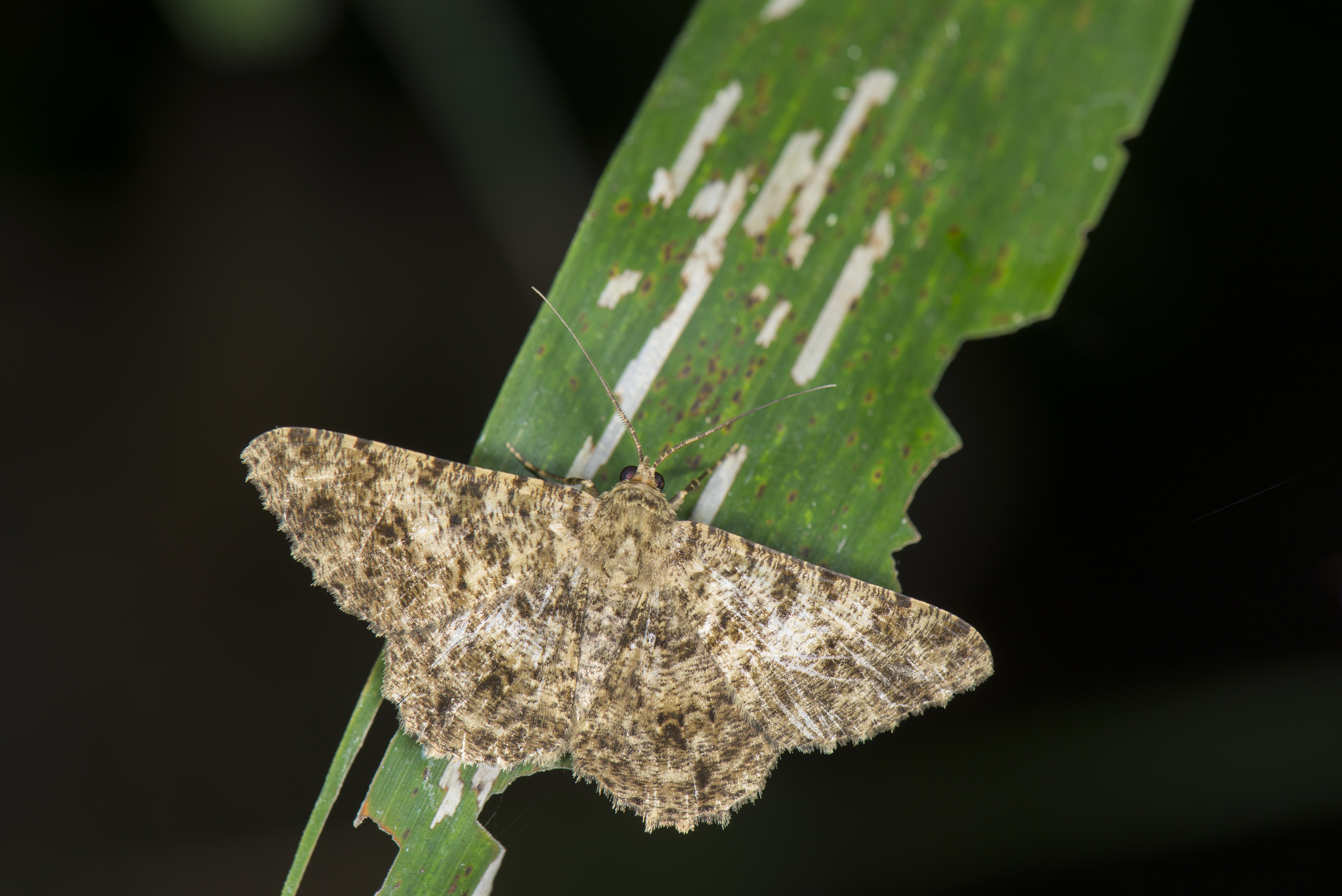

Scientific classification
- Kingdom: Animalia
- Phylum: Arthropoda
- Clade: Pancrustacea
- Class: Insecta
- Order: Lepidoptera
- Family: Geometridae
- Genus: Racotis
- Species: R. boarmiaria

Binomial name
- Racotis boarmiaria (Guenée, 1857)

Synonyms
- Hypochroma boarmiaria Guenée, 1857

= Racotis boarmiaria =

Species of moth

Racotis boarmiaria is a species of moth of the family Geometridae described by Achille Guenée in 1857. It is found in India, Sri Lanka, Maldives, Myanmar, China, Japan, Taiwan, Indonesia, Bhutan and Malaysia.

== Subspecies ==
- Racotis boarmiaria boarmiaria Guenée, 1857
- Racotis boarmiaria plenifasciata Warren, 1894
- Racotis boarmiaria japonica Inoue, 1953 (Japan)
- Racotis boarmiaria illustrata Warren, 1899 (Malaysia)

== Biology ==
This species has a wingspan of 45 to 54 mm. Forewings with veins 10 and 11 stalked. Body brownish ochreous, thickly irrorated (speckled) with rufous brown. Forewings with antemedial, medial, and postmedial speck series, where the latter with a brownish patch at the middle. There is an indistinct pale waved submarginal line present. Hindwings with indistinct antemedial line. Crenulate postmedial line with brown patch at middle, and indistinct waved submarginal line. Both wings with marginal series of specks present. Ventral side is pale ochreous with prominent cell-spots. Outer area fuscous with the margin paler.

Larva bright green with pure white lateral line and short streaks on second and eleventh somites. Some reddish blotches found above and below the line. It has been recorded on Lindera, Neolitsea, Parabenzoin and Litsea cubeba.
