= Stenoglene latimaculata =

Scientific classification
- Kingdom: Animalia
- Phylum: Arthropoda
- Clade: Pancrustacea
- Class: Insecta
- Order: Lepidoptera
- Family: Eupterotidae
- Genus: Stenoglene
- Species: S. latimaculata

Binomial name
- Stenoglene latimaculata Dall'Asta & Poncin, 1980

Species of moth

Stenoglene latimaculata is a moth in the family Eupterotidae. It was described by Ugo Dall'Asta and G. Poncin in 1980. It is found in the former Orientale Province of the Democratic Republic of the Congo.
