= Stenoglene pira =

Scientific classification
- Kingdom: Animalia
- Phylum: Arthropoda
- Clade: Pancrustacea
- Class: Insecta
- Order: Lepidoptera
- Family: Eupterotidae
- Genus: Stenoglene
- Species: S. pira

Binomial name
- Stenoglene pira Druce, 1896

Species of moth

Stenoglene pira is a moth in the family Eupterotidae. It was described by Druce in 1896. It is found in South Africa and Tanzania.

== Description ==
The forewings are pinkish brown, palest near the outer margin, crossed from the costal to the inner margin with two rows of indistinct black spots, the outer margin is shaded with dark brown. The hindwings are pale fawn with a few black hairs along the inner margin.
