= Racotis zebrina =

Scientific classification
- Domain: Eukaryota
- Kingdom: Animalia
- Phylum: Arthropoda
- Class: Insecta
- Order: Lepidoptera
- Family: Geometridae
- Genus: Racotis
- Species: R. zebrina

Binomial name
- Racotis zebrina Warren, 1899

Species of moth

Racotis zebrina is a species of moth of the family Geometridae first described by William Warren in 1899. It is found in central, eastern and southern Africa, from Niger to South Africa.

A known food plant of the larvae is Popowia caffra (Annonaceae).

It can be distinguished from Racotis squalida (Butler, 1878) by its smaller size and by the male antennae. In R. squalida these are quite short and straight, while they are much longer and coarser with strong ciliations in R. zebrina.
