= Alpenus affiniola =

Scientific classification
- Domain: Eukaryota
- Kingdom: Animalia
- Phylum: Arthropoda
- Class: Insecta
- Order: Lepidoptera
- Superfamily: Noctuoidea
- Family: Erebidae
- Subfamily: Arctiinae
- Genus: Alpenus
- Species: A. affiniola

Binomial name
- Alpenus affiniola (Strand, 1919)

Synonyms
- Diacrisia affiniola Strand, 1919; Diacrisia affinis Rothschild, 1910; Alpenus affinis (Rothschild, 1910); Maenas homaema Hampson, 1920; Alpenus homaema (Hampson, 1920); Spilosoma tristicta Hampson, 1920; Spilosoma diffinis Jordan, 1933; Alpenus diffinis (Jordan, 1933)

Species of moth

Alpenus affiniola is a species of moth of the family Erebidae. It was described by Embrik Strand in 1919. It is found in Senegal, Ghana and Nigeria.
