= Donaspastus pannonicus =

Scientific classification
- Kingdom: Animalia
- Phylum: Arthropoda
- Clade: Pancrustacea
- Class: Insecta
- Order: Lepidoptera
- Family: Autostichidae
- Genus: Donaspastus
- Species: D. pannonicus

Binomial name
- Donaspastus pannonicus Gozmány, 1952

Species of moth

Donaspastus pannonicus is a moth of the family Autostichidae. It is found in Italy, Albania, Hungary and Slovakia.
