= Stenoglene decellei =

Scientific classification
- Kingdom: Animalia
- Phylum: Arthropoda
- Clade: Pancrustacea
- Class: Insecta
- Order: Lepidoptera
- Family: Eupterotidae
- Genus: Stenoglene
- Species: S. decellei

Binomial name
- Stenoglene decellei Dall'Asta & Poncin, 1980

Species of moth

Stenoglene decellei is a moth in the family Eupterotidae. It was described by Ugo Dall'Asta and G. Poncin in 1980. It is found in the former Democratic Republic of the Congo provinces of Équateur and Orientale and in South Africa.

== Subspecies ==
- Stenoglene decellei decellei (Democratic Republic of the Congo: Orientale)
- Stenoglene decellei flava Dall'Asta & Poncin, 1980 (South Africa, Democratic Republic of the Congo: Equateur)
