= Stenoglene fouassini =

Scientific classification
- Kingdom: Animalia
- Phylum: Arthropoda
- Clade: Pancrustacea
- Class: Insecta
- Order: Lepidoptera
- Family: Eupterotidae
- Genus: Stenoglene
- Species: S. fouassini

Binomial name
- Stenoglene fouassini Dall'Asta & Poncin, 1980

Species of moth

Stenoglene fouassini is a moth in the family Eupterotidae. It was described by Ugo Dall'Asta and G. Poncin in 1980. It is found in North Kivu, Democratic Republic of the Congo.
