= Stenoglene bouyeri =

Scientific classification
- Kingdom: Animalia
- Phylum: Arthropoda
- Clade: Pancrustacea
- Class: Insecta
- Order: Lepidoptera
- Family: Eupterotidae
- Genus: Stenoglene
- Species: S. bouyeri

Binomial name
- Stenoglene bouyeri Basquin, 2013

Species of moth

Stenoglene bouyeri is a moth in the family Eupterotidae. It was described by Patrick Basquin in 2013. It is found in Cameroon and Gabon.
