= Stenoglene gemmatus =

Scientific classification
- Kingdom: Animalia
- Phylum: Arthropoda
- Clade: Pancrustacea
- Class: Insecta
- Order: Lepidoptera
- Family: Eupterotidae
- Genus: Stenoglene
- Species: S. gemmatus

Binomial name
- Stenoglene gemmatus Wichgraf, 1921

Species of moth

Stenoglene gemmatus is a moth in the family Eupterotidae. It was described by Wichgraf in 1921. It is found in Angola.
