= Alpenus pardalina =

Scientific classification
- Kingdom: Animalia
- Phylum: Arthropoda
- Class: Insecta
- Order: Lepidoptera
- Superfamily: Noctuoidea
- Family: Erebidae
- Subfamily: Arctiinae
- Genus: Alpenus
- Species: A. pardalina

Binomial name
- Alpenus pardalina (Rothschild, 1910)

Synonyms
- Diacrisia pardalina Rothschild, 1910

Species of moth

Alpenus pardalina is a moth of the family Erebidae. It was described by Walter Rothschild in 1910. It is found in Tanzania and Kenya.

The larvae feed on Zea mays (corn).
