= Stenoglene pellucida =

Scientific classification
- Kingdom: Animalia
- Phylum: Arthropoda
- Clade: Pancrustacea
- Class: Insecta
- Order: Lepidoptera
- Family: Eupterotidae
- Genus: Stenoglene
- Species: S. pellucida

Binomial name
- Stenoglene pellucida (Joicey & Talbot, 1924)

Synonyms
- Phasicnecus pellucida Joicey & Talbot, 1924; Phasicnemus novempunctatus Bethune-Baker, 1927

Species of moth

Stenoglene pellucida is a moth in the family Eupterotidae. It was described by James John Joicey and George Talbot in 1924. It is found in Cameroon and the Democratic Republic of the Congo (Orientale).

== Description ==
The wingspan is about 37 mm. Both wings are subhyaline (almost glass like) white, with nine black spots on each side, five spots on the forewings and four on the hindwings, both in the postmedian areas. The forewings have two spots below the costa, the second much larger. There are two spots (one on each side of vein three), the lower one much the larger, and one short dash on the inner margin. Above this is a trace of a few black scales. The hindwings have one spot between veins six and seven, one spot on each side of vein three, the lower being the larger, and one spot on the inner margin. There are also traces of a series of submarginal points.
