= Alpenus =

Scientific classification
- Kingdom: Animalia
- Phylum: Arthropoda
- Class: Insecta
- Order: Lepidoptera
- Superfamily: Noctuoidea
- Family: Erebidae
- Subfamily: Arctiinae
- Tribe: Arctiini
- Subtribe: Spilosomina
- Genus: Alpenus; Walker, 1855

Type species
- Alpenus aequalis Walker, 1855

Synonyms
- Eminaria Bethune-Baker, 1908

Genus of moths

Alpenus is a genus of tiger moths in the family Erebidae. The moths are found in the Afrotropics.

== Species ==
- Alpenus affiniola (Strand, 1919)
- Alpenus auriculatus Watson, 1989
- Alpenus diversatus (Hampson, 1916)
- Alpenus dollmani (Hampson, 1920)
- Alpenus geminipuncta (Hampson, 1916)
- Alpenus intactus (Hampson, 1916)
- Alpenus investigatorum (Karsch, 1898)
- Alpenus maculosus (Stoll in Cramer, 1781)
- Alpenus microstictus (Hampson, 1920)
- Alpenus nigropunctatus (Bethune-Baker, 1908)
- Alpenus pardalina (Rothschild, 1910)
- Alpenus schraderi (Rothschild, 1910)
  - Alpenus schraderi rattrayi (Rothschild, 1910)
- Alpenus thomasi Watson, 1989
- Alpenus whalleyi Watson, 1989
- Alpenus wichgrafi Watson, 1989
