= Donaspastus delicatella =

Scientific classification
- Domain: Eukaryota
- Kingdom: Animalia
- Phylum: Arthropoda
- Class: Insecta
- Order: Lepidoptera
- Family: Autostichidae
- Genus: Donaspastus
- Species: D. delicatella

Binomial name
- Donaspastus delicatella (Walsingham, 1901)

Synonyms
- Symmoca delicatella Walsingham, 1901

Species of moth

Donaspastus delicatella is a moth of the family Autostichidae. It is found on Corsica.

The wingspan is about 12 mm. The forewings are bluish white, dusted with brownish fuscous. The hindwings are shining sericeous greyish.
