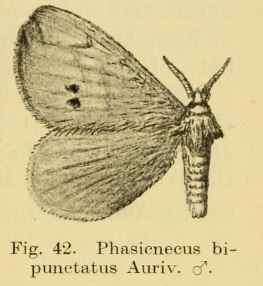

Scientific classification
- Kingdom: Animalia
- Phylum: Arthropoda
- Clade: Pancrustacea
- Class: Insecta
- Order: Lepidoptera
- Family: Eupterotidae
- Genus: Stenoglene
- Species: S. bipunctatus

Binomial name
- Stenoglene bipunctatus (Aurivillius, 1909)

Synonyms
- Phasicnecus bipunctatus Aurivillius, 1909; Phasicnecus inversus Gaede, 1927

= Stenoglene bipunctatus =

Species of moth

Stenoglene bipunctatus is a moth of the family Eupterotidae. It can be found in the Republic of the Congo and in Malawi.

It has a wingspan of 54mm and the holotype provided from Bayengue.

== Subspecies ==
- Stenoglene bipunctatus bipunctatus Aurivillius, 1909 (Congo)
- Stenoglene bipunctatus inversus (Gaede, 1927) (Malawi)
