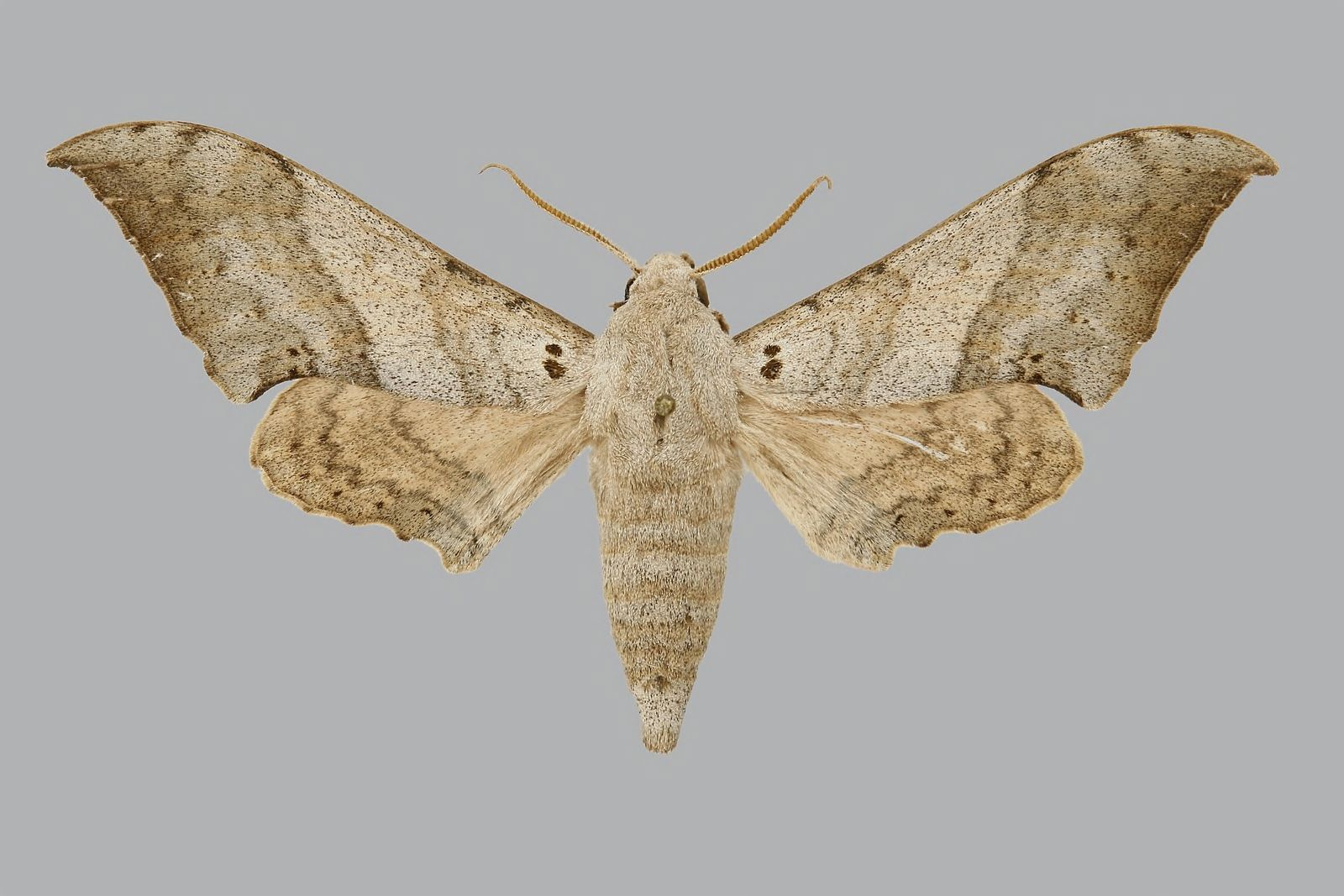
- Falcatula falcatus

Scientific classification
- Domain: Eukaryota
- Kingdom: Animalia
- Phylum: Arthropoda
- Class: Insecta
- Order: Lepidoptera
- Family: Sphingidae
- Tribe: Smerinthini
- Genus: Falcatula; Carcasson, 1968

= Falcatula =

Genus of moths

Falcatula is a genus of moths in the family Sphingidae erected by Robert Herbert Carcasson in 1968.

== Species ==
- Falcatula cymatodes Rothschild & Jordan, 1912
- Falcatula falcatus (Rothschild & Jordan, 1903)
- Falcatula penumbra (Clark 1936)
- Falcatula svaricki Haxaire & Melichar, 2008
- Falcatula tamsi Carcasson, 1968
