= Falcatula penumbra =

Scientific classification
- Domain: Eukaryota
- Kingdom: Animalia
- Phylum: Arthropoda
- Class: Insecta
- Order: Lepidoptera
- Family: Sphingidae
- Genus: Falcatula
- Species: F. penumbra

Binomial name
- Falcatula penumbra (Clark, 1936)

Synonyms
- Polyptychus penumbra Clark, 1936

Species of moth

Falcatula penumbra is a moth of the family Sphingidae. It is known from Zambia and the Democratic Republic of the Congo.
