= Stenoglene nivalis =

Scientific classification
- Kingdom: Animalia
- Phylum: Arthropoda
- Clade: Pancrustacea
- Class: Insecta
- Order: Lepidoptera
- Family: Eupterotidae
- Genus: Stenoglene
- Species: S. nivalis

Binomial name
- Stenoglene nivalis (Rothschild, 1917)

Synonyms
- Phasicnecus nivalis Rothschild, 1917

Species of moth

Stenoglene nivalis is a moth in the family Eupterotidae. It was described by Rothschild in 1917. It is found in the Democratic Republic of Congo (Orientale), Ivory Coast and Sierra Leone.

The wingspan is about 61 mm. The forewings are snow-white and very hairy, with the antemedian band, basal band, postmedian band and a band of coalescent rings greenish grey.
