= Moyencharia sommerlattei =

Scientific classification
- Kingdom: Animalia
- Phylum: Arthropoda
- Class: Insecta
- Order: Lepidoptera
- Family: Cossidae
- Genus: Moyencharia
- Species: M. sommerlattei

Binomial name
- Moyencharia sommerlattei Lehmann, 2013

Species of moth

Moyencharia sommerlattei is a moth of the family Cossidae. It is found in Guinea. The habitat consists of various forest types at low elevations.

The wingspan is about 24 mm.

== Etymology ==
The species is named for Dr Herbert Sommerlatte.
