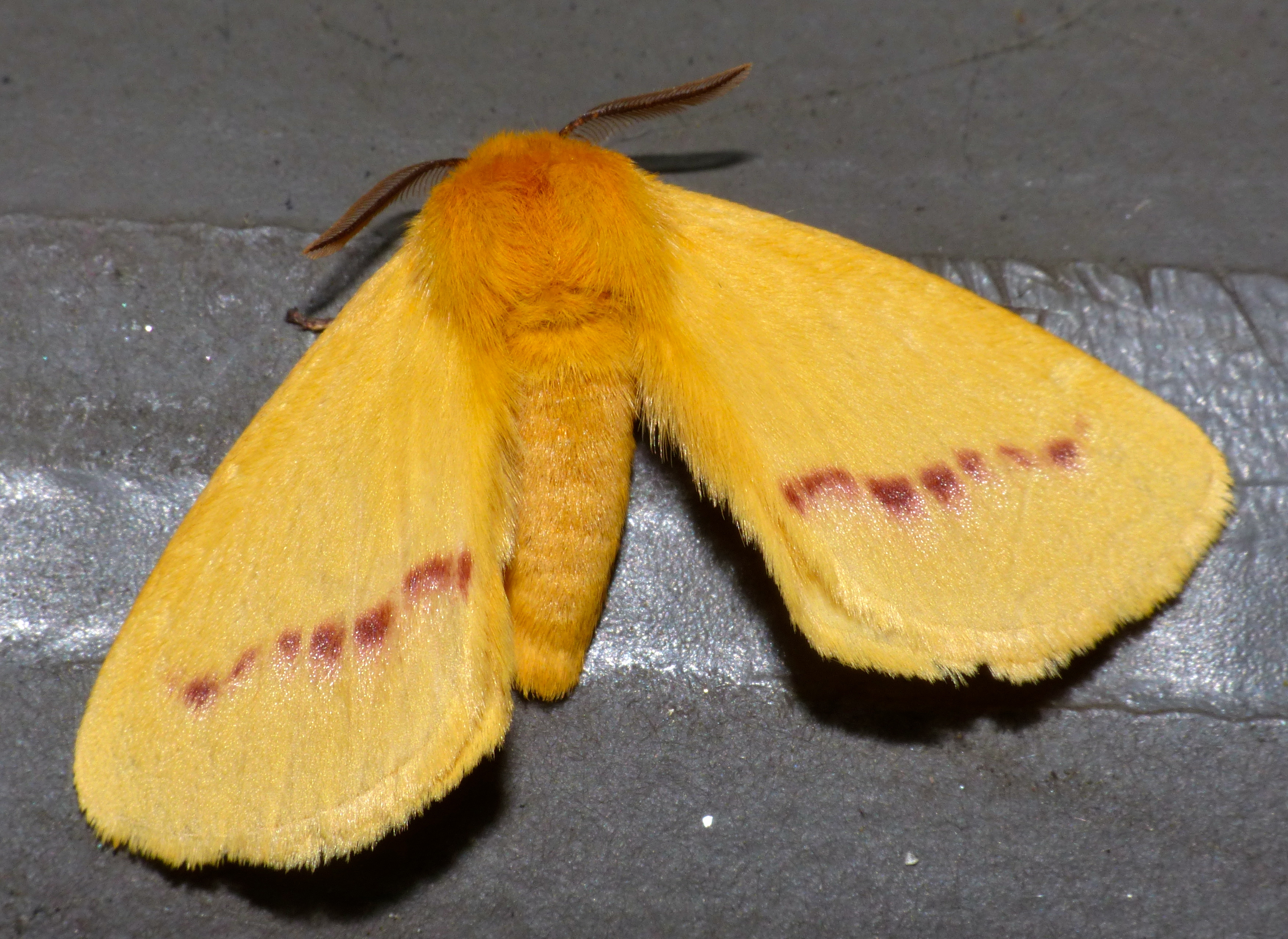

Scientific classification
- Kingdom: Animalia
- Phylum: Arthropoda
- Clade: Pancrustacea
- Class: Insecta
- Order: Lepidoptera
- Family: Eupterotidae
- Genus: Stenoglene
- Species: S. roseus

Binomial name
- Stenoglene roseus (Druce, 1886)

Synonyms
- Phasicnecus roseus Druce, 1886; Phasicnemis elgonae Bethune-Baker, 1927; Phasicnecus similis flavidior Rothschild, 1917; Phasicnecus gregorii Butler, 1894; Phasicnecus monteironis Rothschild, 1917; Phasicnecus pulverulentus Joicey & Talbot, 1924; Phasicnecus similis Rothschild, 1917

= Stenoglene roseus =

Species of moth

Stenoglene roseus is a moth in the family Eupterotidae. It was described by Druce in 1886. It is found in Burundi, the Democratic Republic of Congo (Katanga, East Kasai, Bas Congo), Ivory Coast, Kenya, Malawi, Mozambique, Nigeria and Uganda.

== Description ==
The wingspan is about 54 mm. Both wings are pale golden ochreous, the forewings with a broadish postmedian, concave, rusty transverse band, broadening as it approaches the inner margin near the tornus. The hindwings are immaculate.
