= Stenoglene livingstonensis =

Scientific classification
- Kingdom: Animalia
- Phylum: Arthropoda
- Clade: Pancrustacea
- Class: Insecta
- Order: Lepidoptera
- Family: Eupterotidae
- Genus: Stenoglene
- Species: S. livingstonensis

Binomial name
- Stenoglene livingstonensis (Strand, 1909)

Synonyms
- Phasicnecus livingstonensis Strand, 1909

Species of moth

Stenoglene livingstonensis is a moth in the family Eupterotidae. It was described by Strand in 1909. It is found in Zambia.
