= Stenoglene hilaris =

Scientific classification
- Kingdom: Animalia
- Phylum: Arthropoda
- Clade: Pancrustacea
- Class: Insecta
- Order: Lepidoptera
- Family: Eupterotidae
- Genus: Stenoglene
- Species: S. hilaris

Binomial name
- Stenoglene hilaris Felder, 1874

Synonyms
- Chrysopoloma bithynia Druce, 1887

Species of moth

Stenoglene hilaris is a moth in the family Eupterotidae. It was described by Felder in 1874. It is found in Mozambique and South Africa.

Adults are uniform mouse-colour, with the forewings a shade darker than the hindwings, the former crossed by two curved lines, the first nearest the base very indistinct, the second broken into spots.
