= Donaspastus liguricus =

Scientific classification
- Kingdom: Animalia
- Phylum: Arthropoda
- Clade: Pancrustacea
- Class: Insecta
- Order: Lepidoptera
- Family: Autostichidae
- Genus: Donaspastus
- Species: D. liguricus

Binomial name
- Donaspastus liguricus Gozmány, 1977

Species of moth

Donaspastus liguricus is a moth of the family Autostichidae. It is found in Italy.
