= Alpenus microstictus =

Scientific classification
- Kingdom: Animalia
- Phylum: Arthropoda
- Class: Insecta
- Order: Lepidoptera
- Superfamily: Noctuoidea
- Family: Erebidae
- Subfamily: Arctiinae
- Genus: Alpenus
- Species: A. microstictus

Binomial name
- Alpenus microstictus (Hampson, 1920)

Synonyms
- Spilosoma microsticta Hampson, 1920; Alpenus microsticta

Species of moth

Alpenus microstictus is a moth of the family Erebidae. It was described by George Hampson in 1920. It is found in Nigeria.
