= Stenoglene bicolor =

Scientific classification
- Kingdom: Animalia
- Phylum: Arthropoda
- Clade: Pancrustacea
- Class: Insecta
- Order: Lepidoptera
- Family: Eupterotidae
- Genus: Stenoglene
- Species: S. bicolor

Binomial name
- Stenoglene bicolor (Distant, 1897)

Synonyms
- Phasicnecus bicolor Distant, 1897

Species of moth

Stenoglene bicolor is a moth in the family Eupterotidae. It was described by William Lucas Distant in 1897. It is found in South Africa.
