= Donaspastus digitatus =

Scientific classification
- Kingdom: Animalia
- Phylum: Arthropoda
- Clade: Pancrustacea
- Class: Insecta
- Order: Lepidoptera
- Family: Autostichidae
- Genus: Donaspastus
- Species: D. digitatus

Binomial name
- Donaspastus digitatus Gozmány, 1985

Species of moth

Donaspastus digitatus is a moth of the family Autostichidae. It is found in Spain.
