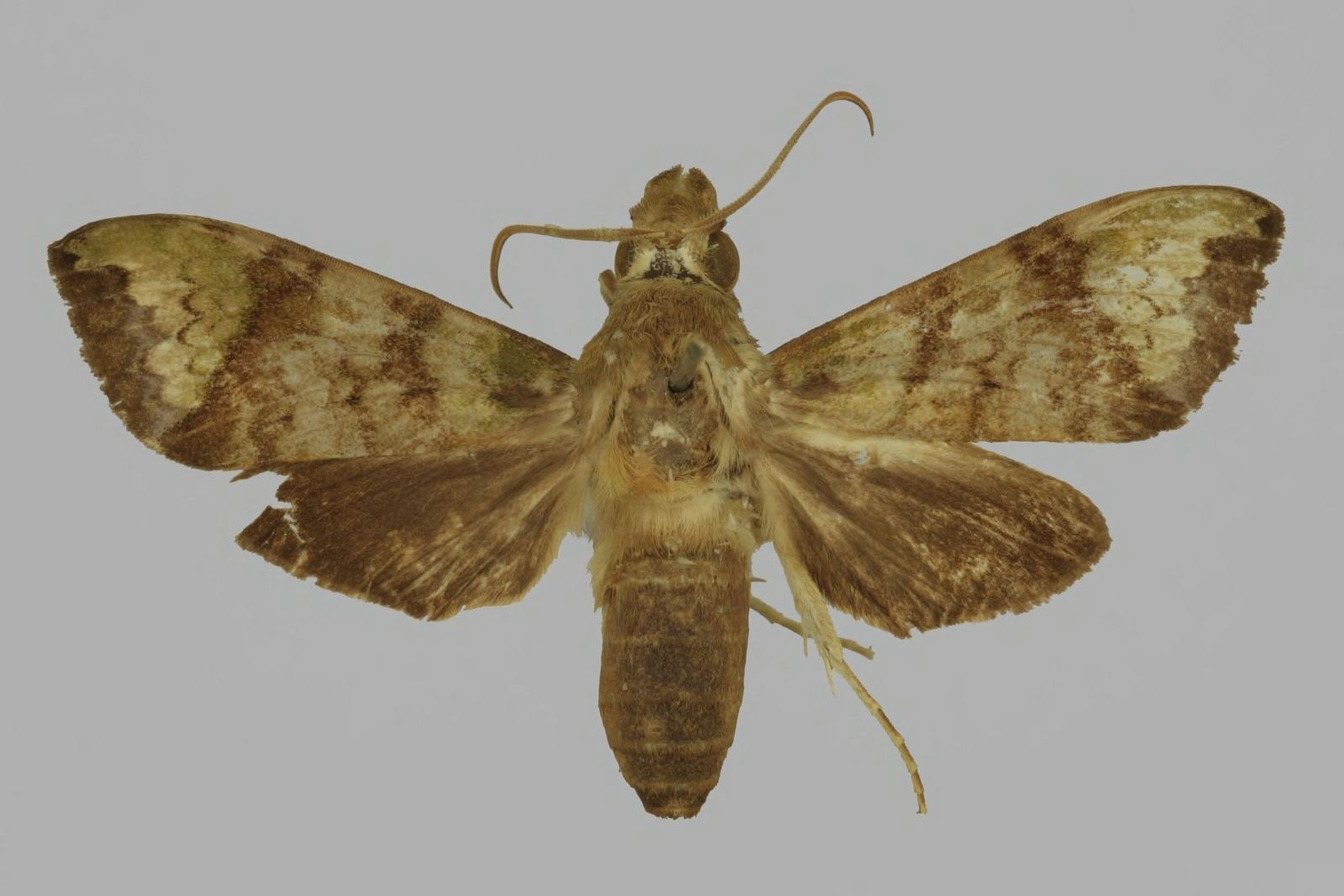
- Male

Scientific classification
- Kingdom: Animalia
- Phylum: Arthropoda
- Class: Insecta
- Order: Lepidoptera
- Family: Sphingidae
- Genus: Antinephele
- Species: A. muscosa

Binomial name
- Antinephele muscosa Holland, 1889

= Antinephele muscosa =

Species of moth

Antinephele muscosa is a moth of the family Sphingidae. It is found from Ghana to Gabon.
