= Moyencharia joeli =

Scientific classification
- Kingdom: Animalia
- Phylum: Arthropoda
- Class: Insecta
- Order: Lepidoptera
- Family: Cossidae
- Genus: Moyencharia
- Species: M. joeli

Binomial name
- Moyencharia joeli Lehmann, 2013

Species of moth

Moyencharia joeli is a moth of the family Cossidae. It is found in north-central and north-east central Nigeria and probably north-western Cameroon.

== Etymology ==
The species is named for Joel Mutisya Kioko.
