= Stenoglene shabae =

Scientific classification
- Kingdom: Animalia
- Phylum: Arthropoda
- Clade: Pancrustacea
- Class: Insecta
- Order: Lepidoptera
- Family: Eupterotidae
- Genus: Stenoglene
- Species: S. shabae

Binomial name
- Stenoglene shabae Dall'Asta & Poncin, 1980

Species of moth

Stenoglene shabae is a moth in the family Eupterotidae. It was described by Ugo Dall'Asta and G. Poncin in 1980. It is found in the former Katanga Province of the Democratic Republic of the Congo.
