= Stenoglene sulphureoides =

Scientific classification
- Kingdom: Animalia
- Phylum: Arthropoda
- Clade: Pancrustacea
- Class: Insecta
- Order: Lepidoptera
- Family: Eupterotidae
- Genus: Stenoglene
- Species: S. sulphureoides

Binomial name
- Stenoglene sulphureoides Kühne, 2007

Species of moth

Stenoglene sulphureoides is a moth in the family Eupterotidae. It was described by Lars Kühne in 2007. It is found in Kenya.
