= Alpenus geminipuncta =

Scientific classification
- Kingdom: Animalia
- Phylum: Arthropoda
- Class: Insecta
- Order: Lepidoptera
- Superfamily: Noctuoidea
- Family: Erebidae
- Subfamily: Arctiinae
- Genus: Alpenus
- Species: A. geminipuncta

Binomial name
- Alpenus geminipuncta (Hampson, 1916)

Synonyms
- Diacrisia geminipuncta Hampson, 1916

Species of moth

Alpenus geminipuncta is a moth of the family Erebidae. It was described by George Hampson in 1916. It is found in Ethiopia.
