= Stenoglene giganteus =

Scientific classification
- Kingdom: Animalia
- Phylum: Arthropoda
- Clade: Pancrustacea
- Class: Insecta
- Order: Lepidoptera
- Family: Eupterotidae
- Genus: Stenoglene
- Species: S. giganteus

Binomial name
- Stenoglene giganteus (Rothschild, 1917)

Synonyms
- Phasicnecus giganteus Rothschild, 1917

Species of moth

Stenoglene giganteus is a moth in the family Eupterotidae. It was described by Rothschild in 1917. It is found in Sierra Leone.

The wingspan is about 85 mm. The forewings are purplish cinnamon-chocolate with a postmedian whitish-pink transverse band. The hindwings are paler.
