= Alpenus intactus =

Scientific classification
- Kingdom: Animalia
- Phylum: Arthropoda
- Class: Insecta
- Order: Lepidoptera
- Superfamily: Noctuoidea
- Family: Erebidae
- Subfamily: Arctiinae
- Genus: Alpenus
- Species: A. intactus

Binomial name
- Alpenus intactus (Hampson, 1916)

Synonyms
- Maenas intacta Hampson, 1916; Alpenus intacta

Species of moth

Alpenus intactus is a moth of the family Erebidae. It was described by George Hampson in 1916. It is found in northern Nigeria.
