= Alpenus dollmani =

Scientific classification
- Kingdom: Animalia
- Phylum: Arthropoda
- Class: Insecta
- Order: Lepidoptera
- Superfamily: Noctuoidea
- Family: Erebidae
- Subfamily: Arctiinae
- Genus: Alpenus
- Species: A. dollmani

Binomial name
- Alpenus dollmani (Hampson, 1920)

Synonyms
- Spilosoma dollmani Hampson, 1920

Species of moth

Alpenus dollmani is a moth of the family Erebidae. It was described by George Hampson in 1920. It is found in Zambia and Zaire.
