= Stenoglene parvula =

Scientific classification
- Kingdom: Animalia
- Phylum: Arthropoda
- Clade: Pancrustacea
- Class: Insecta
- Order: Lepidoptera
- Family: Eupterotidae
- Genus: Stenoglene
- Species: S. parvula

Binomial name
- Stenoglene parvula Dall'Asta & Poncin, 1980

Species of moth

Stenoglene parvula is a moth in the family Eupterotidae. It was described by Ugo Dall'Asta and G. Poncin in 1980. It is found in the former Orientale Province of the Democratic Republic of the Congo.
