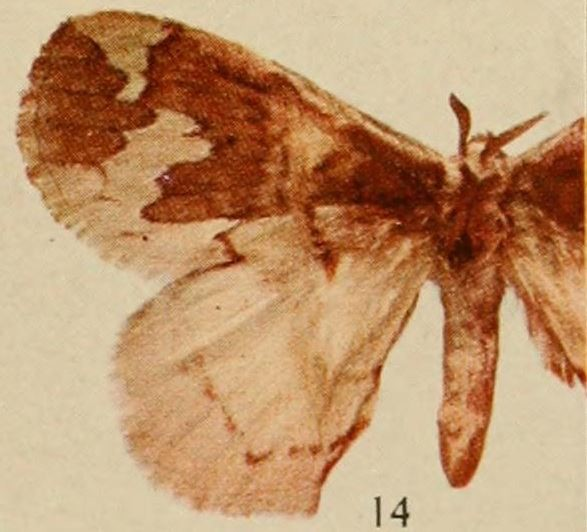
- Stenoglene plagiatus

Scientific classification
- Kingdom: Animalia
- Phylum: Arthropoda
- Class: Insecta
- Order: Lepidoptera
- Family: Eupterotidae
- Genus: Stenoglene; Felder, 1874

Synonyms
- Phasicnecus Butler, 1894

= Stenoglene =

Genus of moths

Stenoglene is a genus of moths in the family Eupterotidae from Africa. The genus was described by Felder in 1874.

== Species ==
- Stenoglene basquini Bouyer, 2012
- Stenoglene bicolor (Distant, 1897)
- Stenoglene bipartita (Rothschild, 1917)
- Stenoglene bipunctatus (Aurivillius, 1909)
- Stenoglene bouyeri Basquin, 2013
- Stenoglene brunneofasciata Dall'Asta & Poncin, 1980
- Stenoglene citrinoides Dall'Asta & Poncin, 1980
- Stenoglene citrinus (Druce, 1886)
- Stenoglene decellei Dall'Asta & Poncin, 1980
- Stenoglene dehanicus (Strand, 1911)
- Stenoglene fontainei Dall'Asta & Poncin, 1980
- Stenoglene fouassini Dall'Asta & Poncin, 1980
- Stenoglene gemmatus Wichgraf, 1921
- Stenoglene giganteus (Rothschild, 1917)
- Stenoglene hilaris Felder, 1874
- Stenoglene latimaculata Dall'Asta & Poncin, 1980
- Stenoglene livingstonensis (Strand, 1909)
- Stenoglene nivalis (Rothschild, 1917)
- Stenoglene obtusus (Walker, 1864)
- Stenoglene opalina Druce, 1910
- Stenoglene parvula Dall'Asta & Poncin, 1980
- Stenoglene paulisi Dall'Asta & Poncin, 1980
- Stenoglene pellucida Joicey & Talbot, 1924
- Stenoglene pira Druce, 1896
- Stenoglene plagiatus (Aurivillius, 1911)
- Stenoglene preussi (Aurivillius, 1893)
- Stenoglene pujoli Dall'Asta & Poncin, 1980
- Stenoglene roseus (Druce, 1886)
- Stenoglene shabae Dall'Asta & Poncin, 1980
- Stenoglene sulphureoides Kühne, 2007
- Stenoglene sulphureotinctus (Strand, 1912)
- Stenoglene thelda (Druce, 1887)
- Stenoglene uelei Dall'Asta & Poncin, 1980
- Stenoglene uniformis Dall'Asta & Poncin, 1980

== Former species ==
- Stenoglene nahor Druce, 1896
