= Donaspastus =

Scientific classification
- Kingdom: Animalia
- Phylum: Arthropoda
- Clade: Pancrustacea
- Class: Insecta
- Order: Lepidoptera
- Family: Autostichidae
- Subfamily: Symmocinae
- Genus: Donaspastus; Gozmány, 1952

Synonyms
- Neospastus Gozmány, 1957

Genus of moths

Donaspastus is a moth genus in the family Autostichidae.

== Species ==
- Donaspastus bosellii (Hartig, 1941)
- Donaspastus delicatella (Walsingham, 1901)
- Donaspastus digitatus Gozmány, 1985
- Donaspastus liguricus Gozmány, 1977
- Donaspastus pannonicus Gozmány, 1952
- Donaspastus ubangi (Gozmány, 1966)
