= Moyencharia herhausi =

Scientific classification
- Domain: Eukaryota
- Kingdom: Animalia
- Phylum: Arthropoda
- Class: Insecta
- Order: Lepidoptera
- Family: Cossidae
- Genus: Moyencharia
- Species: M. herhausi

Binomial name
- Moyencharia herhausi Lehmann, 2013

Species of moth

Moyencharia herhausi is a moth of the family Cossidae. It is found in south-western Burkina Faso and probably south-eastern Mali. The habitat consists of a mosaic of wooded farmland and Sudanian woodland with pockets of dry and riparian forests at low elevations.

The wingspan is about 26 mm.

== Etymology ==
The species is named for Frank Herhaus.
