= Racotis deportata =

Scientific classification
- Domain: Eukaryota
- Kingdom: Animalia
- Phylum: Arthropoda
- Class: Insecta
- Order: Lepidoptera
- Family: Geometridae
- Genus: Racotis
- Species: R. deportata

Binomial name
- Racotis deportata Herbulot, 1970

Species of moth

Racotis deportata is a species of moth of the family Geometridae first described by Claude Herbulot in 1970. It is found in northern Madagascar.

This species looks similar to Racotis apodosima, Prout.
