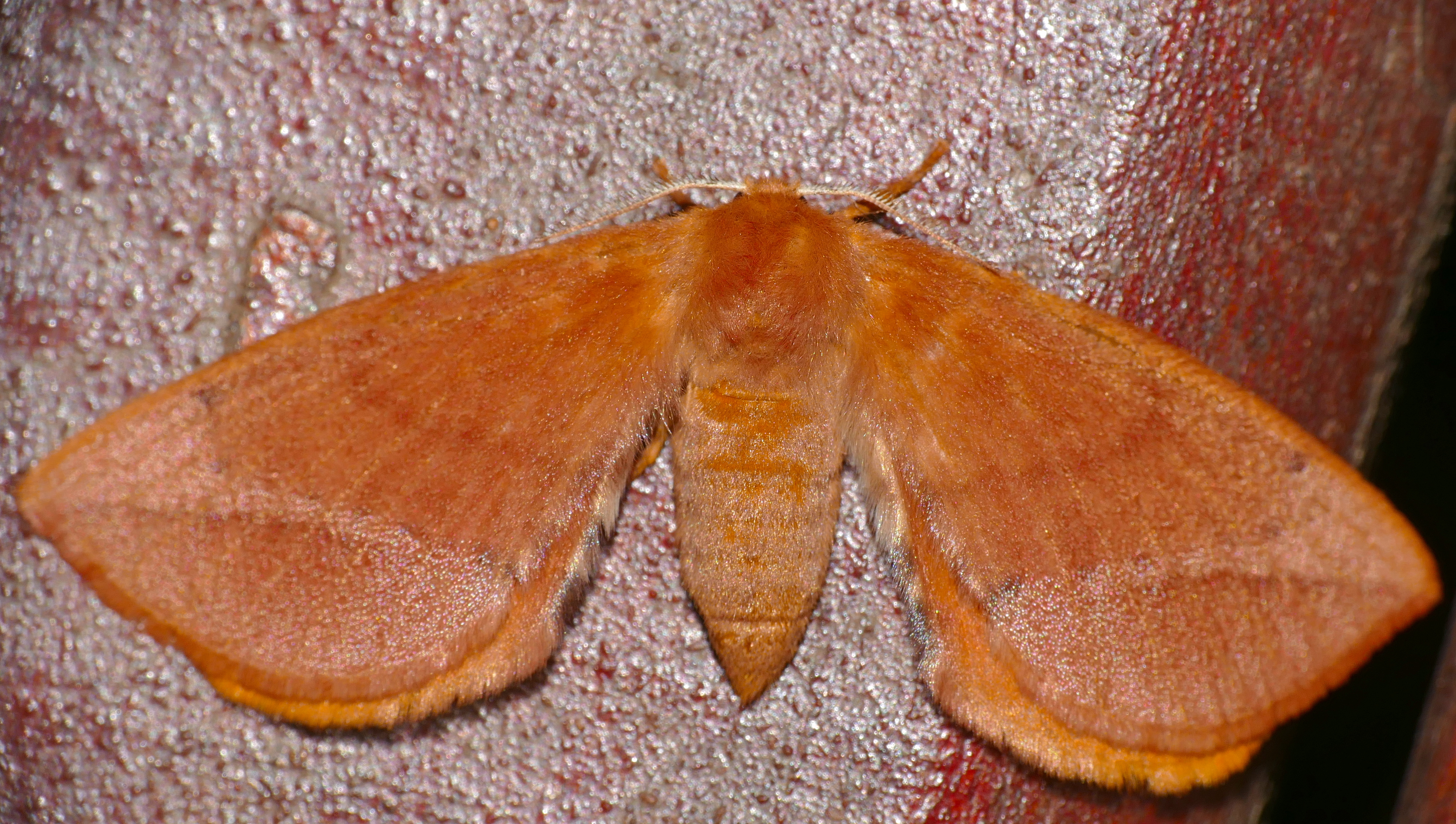

Scientific classification
- Kingdom: Animalia
- Phylum: Arthropoda
- Clade: Pancrustacea
- Class: Insecta
- Order: Lepidoptera
- Family: Eupterotidae
- Genus: Stenoglene
- Species: S. obtusus

Binomial name
- Stenoglene obtusus (Walker, 1864)

Synonyms
- Poloma obtusa Walker, 1864; Poloma obtusus; Phasicnecus aequidistans Strand, 1915; Phasicnecus evanescens Distant, 1903; Chrysopoloma labda Druce, 1887; Phasicnecus subcroceus Distant, 1903; Stenoglene tristis Felder, 1874

= Stenoglene obtusus =

Species of moth

Stenoglene obtusus is a moth in the family Eupterotidae. It was described by Francis Walker in 1864. It is found in Burundi, the Democratic Republic of the Congo (East Kasai, Katanga), Kenya, Malawi, Mozambique, South Africa (Gauteng, KwaZulu-Natal), Tanzania and Zimbabwe.

== Description ==
The wingspan is about 45 mm. The forewings are fulvous with almost obliterated transverse linear fasciae, the first practically obsolete and not anteriorly recurved, the second a little more distinct. The hindwings are croceous (deep reddish yellow) without black spots on the abdominal area.
