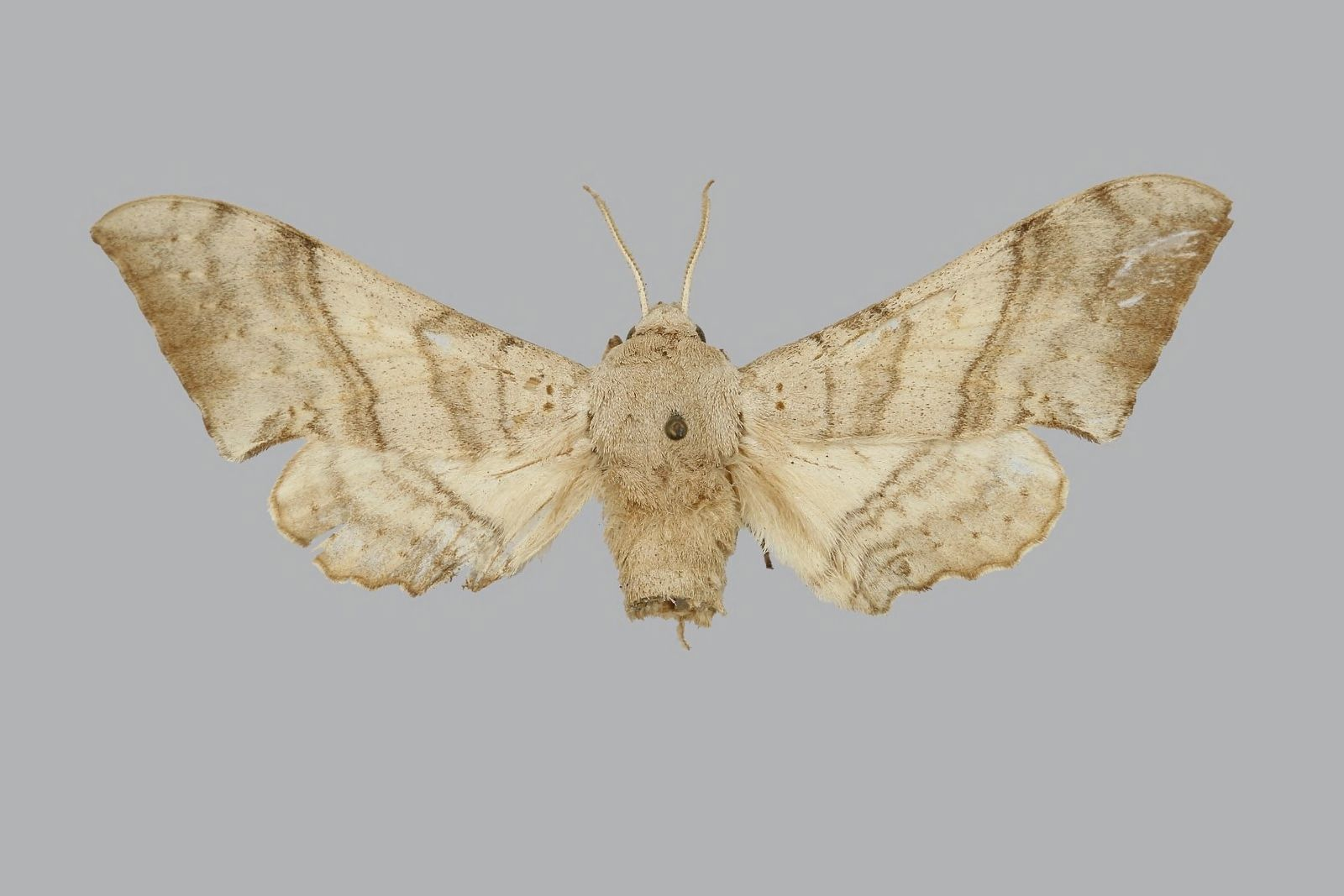

Scientific classification
- Kingdom: Animalia
- Phylum: Arthropoda
- Class: Insecta
- Order: Lepidoptera
- Family: Sphingidae
- Genus: Falcatula
- Species: F. tamsi

Binomial name
- Falcatula tamsi Carcasson, 1968

= Falcatula tamsi =

Species of moth

Falcatula tamsi is a moth of the family Sphingidae. It is known from Ethiopia.

The length of the forewings is 33 mm for males.
