= Stenoglene fontainei =

Scientific classification
- Kingdom: Animalia
- Phylum: Arthropoda
- Clade: Pancrustacea
- Class: Insecta
- Order: Lepidoptera
- Family: Eupterotidae
- Genus: Stenoglene
- Species: S. fontainei

Binomial name
- Stenoglene fontainei Dall'Asta & Poncin, 1980

Species of moth

Stenoglene fontainei is a moth in the family Eupterotidae. It was described by Ugo Dall'Asta and G. Poncin in 1980. It is found in the former Orientale Province in the Democratic Republic of the Congo.
