= Moyencharia =

Scientific classification
- Domain: Eukaryota
- Kingdom: Animalia
- Phylum: Arthropoda
- Class: Insecta
- Order: Lepidoptera
- Family: Cossidae
- Subfamily: Metarbelinae
- Genus: Moyencharia; Lehmann, 2013

Type species
- Moyencharia mineti Lehmann, 2013

Genus of moths

Moyencharia is a genus of moths belonging to the family of Cossidae, Metarbelidae.

== Distribution ==
The known species of this genus are found in Africa.

== Species ==
- Moyencharia herhausi
- Moyencharia joeli
- Moyencharia mineti
- Moyencharia ochreicosta
- Moyencharia sommerlattei
- Moyencharia winteri
