= Stenoglene opalina =

Scientific classification
- Kingdom: Animalia
- Phylum: Arthropoda
- Clade: Pancrustacea
- Class: Insecta
- Order: Lepidoptera
- Family: Eupterotidae
- Genus: Stenoglene
- Species: S. opalina

Binomial name
- Stenoglene opalina Druce, 1910

Synonyms
- Phasicnecus peropalinus Rothschild, 1917

Species of moth

Stenoglene opalina is a moth in the family Eupterotidae. It was described by Druce in 1910. It is found in Cameroon and the Democratic Republic of Congo.

== Description ==
The wingspan is about 54 mm. The forewings are yellowish vitreous strongly opalescent with numerous indistinct crenulate and sinuate transverse darker markings, these latter being almost absent in the basal three-fifths of the wings.
