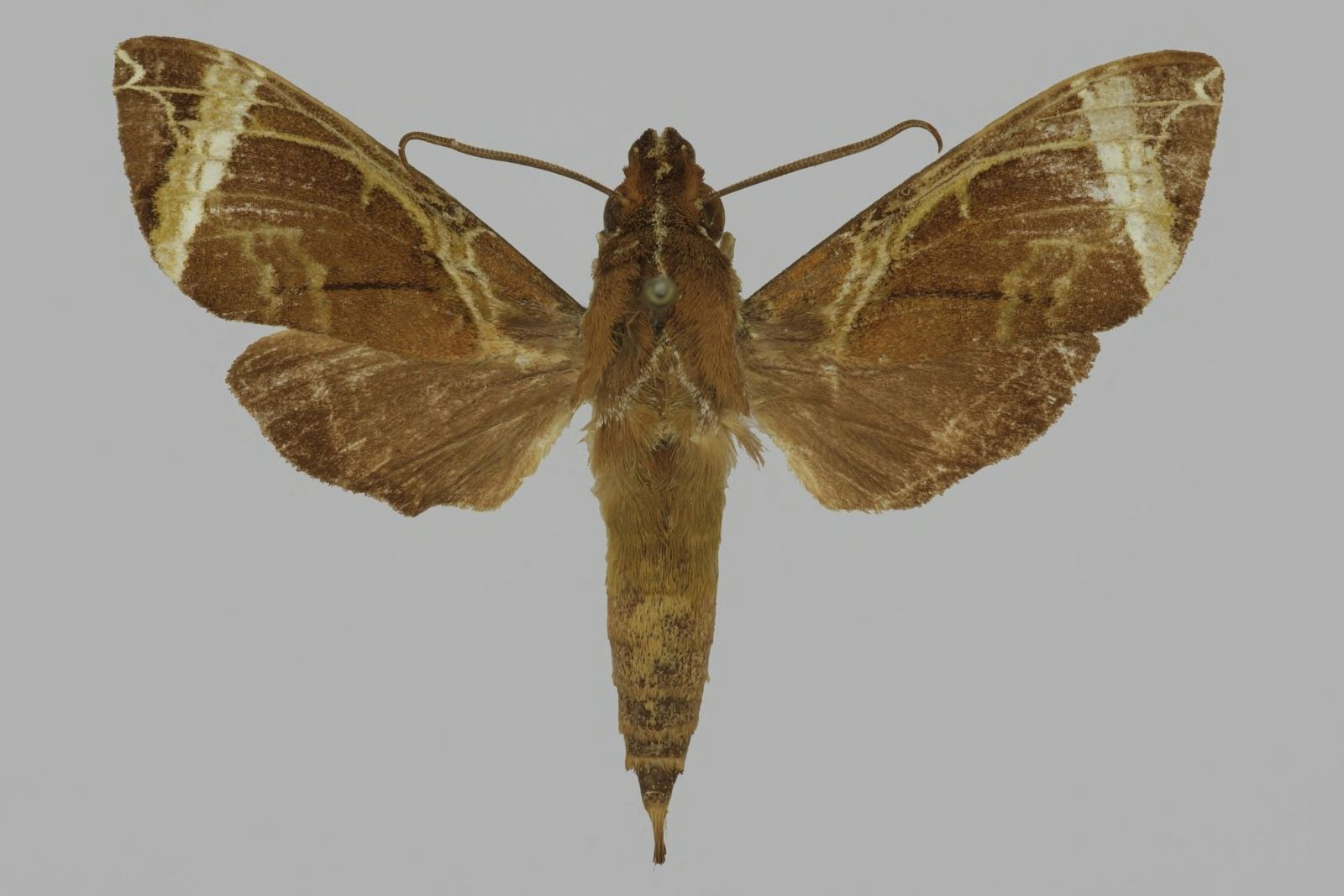
- Antinephele anomala

Scientific classification
- Domain: Eukaryota
- Kingdom: Animalia
- Phylum: Arthropoda
- Class: Insecta
- Order: Lepidoptera
- Family: Sphingidae
- Subtribe: Macroglossina
- Genus: Antinephele; Holland, 1889

= Antinephele =

Genus of moths

Antinephele is a genus of moths in the family Sphingidae erected by William Jacob Holland in 1889.

== Species ==
- Antinephele achlora Holland, 1892
- Antinephele anomala (Butler, 1882)
- Antinephele camerunensis Clark, 1937
- Antinephele efulani Clark, 1926
- Antinephele lunulata Rothschild & Jordan, 1903
- Antinephele maculifera Holland, 1889
- Antinephele marcida Holland, 1893
- Antinephele muscosa Holland, 1889
