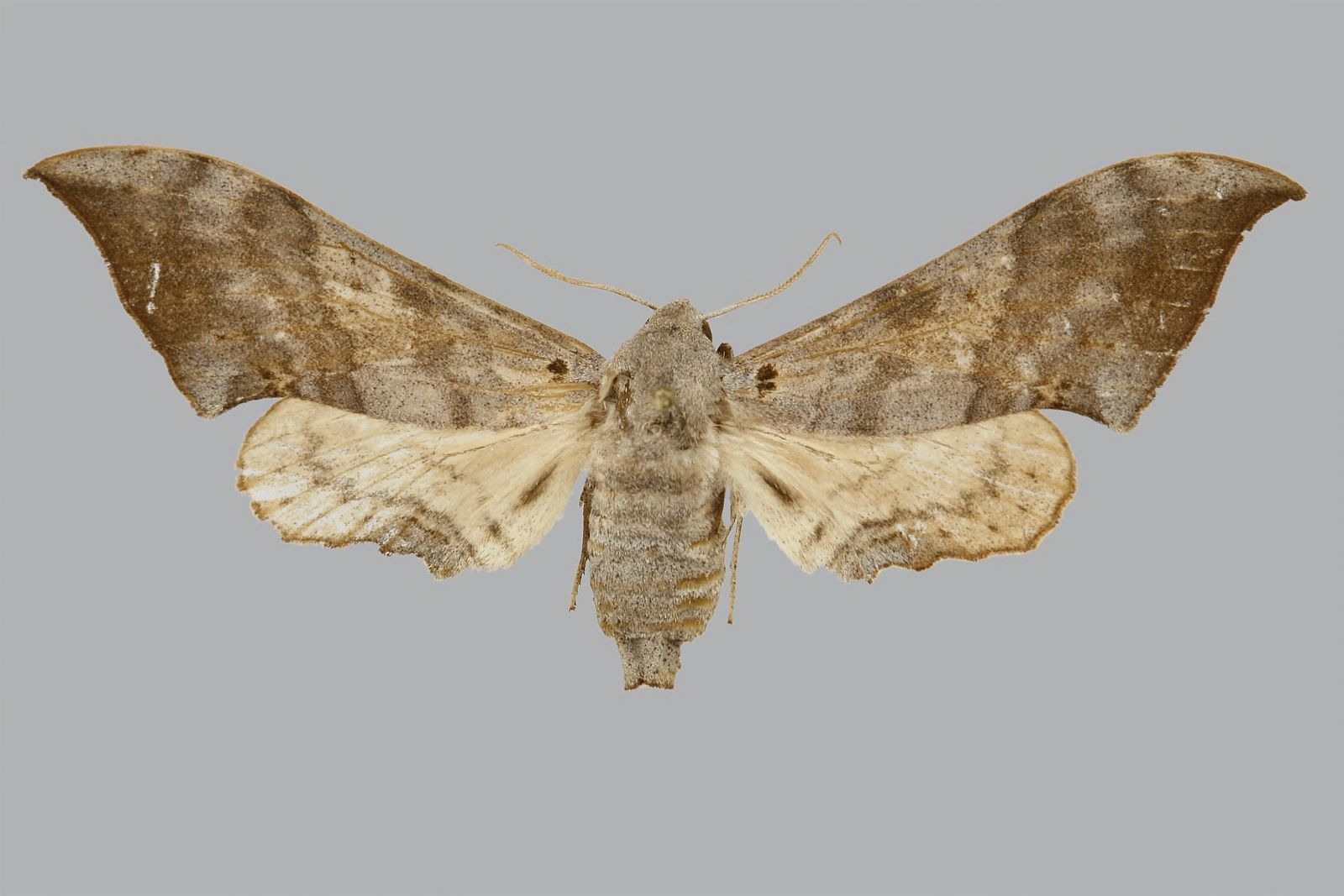

Scientific classification
- Domain: Eukaryota
- Kingdom: Animalia
- Phylum: Arthropoda
- Class: Insecta
- Order: Lepidoptera
- Family: Sphingidae
- Genus: Falcatula
- Species: F. svaricki

Binomial name
- Falcatula svaricki Haxaire & Melichar, 2008

= Falcatula svaricki =

Species of moth

Falcatula svaricki is a moth of the family Sphingidae. It is known from Ethiopia and Kenya.
