= Stenoglene basquini =

Scientific classification
- Kingdom: Animalia
- Phylum: Arthropoda
- Clade: Pancrustacea
- Class: Insecta
- Order: Lepidoptera
- Family: Eupterotidae
- Genus: Stenoglene
- Species: S. basquini

Binomial name
- Stenoglene basquini Bouyer, 2012

Species of moth

Stenoglene basquini is a moth in the family Eupterotidae. It was described by Thierry Bouyer in 2012. It is found in the Central African Republic.
