= Stenoglene bipartita =

Scientific classification
- Kingdom: Animalia
- Phylum: Arthropoda
- Clade: Pancrustacea
- Class: Insecta
- Order: Lepidoptera
- Family: Eupterotidae
- Genus: Stenoglene
- Species: S. bipartita

Binomial name
- Stenoglene bipartita (Rothschild, 1917)

Synonyms
- Camarunia bipartita Rothschild, 1917

Species of moth

Stenoglene bipartita is a moth in the family Eupterotidae. It was described by Rothschild in 1917. It is found in Democratic Republic of Congo (Orientale), Niger and Nigeria.

The wingspan is about 55 mm. The costal portion of the forewings is olive-chocolate with a shadowy darker stigmatic patch and the dividing line dirty pink. The tornal portion is yellowish grey, washed with olive-brown and with four transverse lines of varying length, the two middle ones crenulate. The hindwings are yellow-grey with two dark-grey transverse bands and there is a wedge-shaped area running almost to the base between the abdominal area and the costal three-fifths of the wing is dirty orange.
