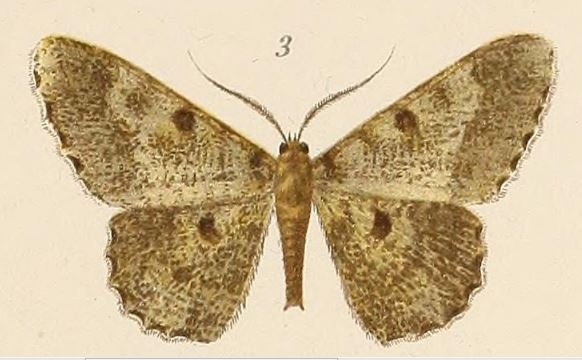
- Racotis squalida

Scientific classification
- Kingdom: Animalia
- Phylum: Arthropoda
- Clade: Pancrustacea
- Class: Insecta
- Order: Lepidoptera
- Family: Geometridae
- Subfamily: Ennominae
- Tribe: Boarmiini
- Genus: Racotis; Moore, 1887

= Racotis =

Genus of moths

Racotis is a genus of moths in the family Geometridae. The genus was erected by Frederic Moore in 1887.

== Species ==
Some species of this genus are:

- Racotis anaglyptica Prout 1935
- Racotis angulosa Herbulot, 1973
- Racotis apodosima Prout, 1931
- Racotis boarmiaria Guenée 1858
- Racotis breijeri (Prout, 1922)
- Racotis canui Herbulot, 1991
- Racotis cedrici Herbulot, 1998
- Racotis cogens Prout 1929
- Racotis deportata Herbulot, 1970
- Racotis discistigmaria Hampson 1902
- Racotis incauta (Prout, 1916)
- Racotis incompletaria (Guenée, 1862)
- Racotis inconclusa Walker 1860
- Racotis maculata Lucas 1889
- Racotis monognampta Prout 1937
- Racotis neonephria Prout 1935
- Racotis sordida Warren 1896
- Racotis squalida (Butler, 1878)
- Racotis submuscaria Pagenstecher 1900
- Racotis zebrina Warren, 1899
