= Alpenus schraderi =

Scientific classification
- Kingdom: Animalia
- Phylum: Arthropoda
- Class: Insecta
- Order: Lepidoptera
- Superfamily: Noctuoidea
- Family: Erebidae
- Subfamily: Arctiinae
- Genus: Alpenus
- Species: A. schraderi

Binomial name
- Alpenus schraderi (Rothschild, 1910)

Synonyms
- Diacrisia schraderi Rothschild, 1910; Diacrisia rattrayi Rothschild, 1910

Species of moth

Alpenus schraderi is a moth of the family Erebidae. It was described by Walter Rothschild in 1910. It is found in Ethiopia, Sudan, Kenya, Uganda and Tanzania.

The larvae feed on Amaryllis belladonna, Averhoa carambola, Albizzia zygia, Canavalia ensiformis, Musa sapientum and Theobroma cacao.

== Subspecies ==
- Alpenus schraderi schraderi (Ethiopia)
- Alpenus schraderi rattrayi (Rothschild, 1910) (Sudan, Kenya, Uganda, Tanzania)
