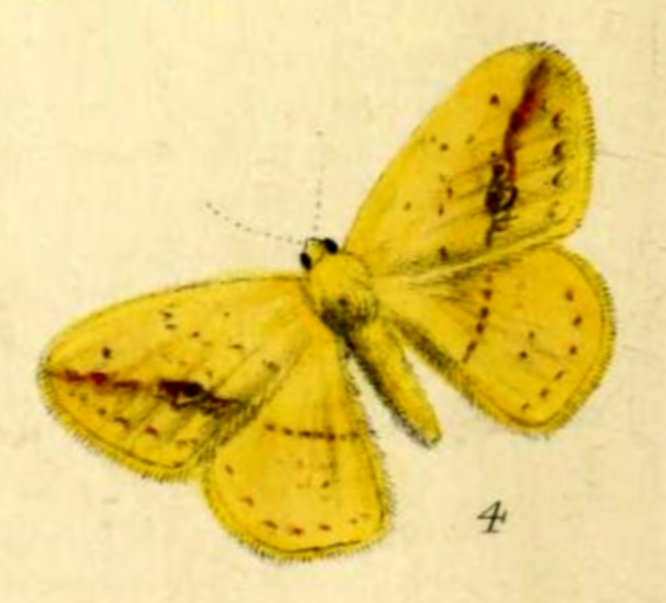

Scientific classification
- Kingdom: Animalia
- Phylum: Arthropoda
- Clade: Pancrustacea
- Class: Insecta
- Order: Lepidoptera
- Family: Eupterotidae
- Genus: Stenoglene
- Species: S. citrinus

Binomial name
- Stenoglene citrinus (Druce, 1886)

Synonyms
- Chrysopoloma citrina Druce, 1886; Stenoglene citrina Druce, 1886

= Stenoglene citrinus =

Species of moth

Stenoglene citrinus is a moth in the family Eupterotidae. It was described by Druce in 1886. It is found in Cameroon, the Central African Republic, the Democratic Republic of Congo (Equateur, East Kasai), Gabon and Nigeria.

The forewings are pale yellow, crossed about the middle, from the coastal to the inner margin, by a band of very small brown spots, beyond which is a second band, extending from the apex to the inner margin. The second band is very much wider, and near the inner margin, it has several whitish spots. There is also a submarginal row of minute dots extending from the apex to the anal angle. The hindwings are pale yellow, with a central and submarginal row of small brown spots.
