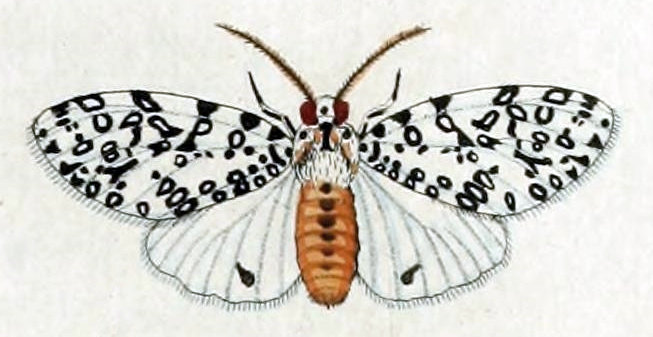

Scientific classification
- Domain: Eukaryota
- Kingdom: Animalia
- Phylum: Arthropoda
- Class: Insecta
- Order: Lepidoptera
- Superfamily: Noctuoidea
- Family: Erebidae
- Subfamily: Arctiinae
- Genus: Alpenus
- Species: A. maculosus

Binomial name
- Alpenus maculosus (Stoll in Cramer, 1781)

Synonyms
- Phalaena Bombyx maculosa Stoll in Cramer, 1781; Alpenus maculosa; Ecpantheria assimilis Hübner, [1820]; Alpenus aequalis Walker, 1855; Ecpantheria indeterminata Walker, 1855; Halesidota macularia Walker, [1865]; Alpenus macularia (Walker, [1865]); Spilosoma eyralpenus Plötz, 1880; Alpenus eyralpenus (Plötz, 1880); Alpenus maculosus var. kordofanus Wichgraf, 1922

= Alpenus maculosus =

Species of moth

Alpenus maculosus is a species of moth of the family Erebidae. It was described by Caspar Stoll in 1781. It is found along the Gold Coast and in Lagos, Sierra Leone, Guinea, Angola, Cameroon, Nigeria, the Republic of the Congo, Uganda, eastern Africa and Zimbabwe.

The larvae feed on Commelina, Aster, Bidens pilosa, Senecio abyssinicus, Ipomoea, Zea mays, Arachis hypogaea, Phaseolus, Pseudarthria, Voandzeia subterranea, Gossypium and Theobroma cacao.
