= Moyencharia winteri =

Scientific classification
- Kingdom: Animalia
- Phylum: Arthropoda
- Class: Insecta
- Order: Lepidoptera
- Family: Cossidae
- Genus: Moyencharia
- Species: M. winteri

Binomial name
- Moyencharia winteri Lehmann, 2013

Species of moth

Moyencharia winteri is a moth of the family Cossidae. It is found in south-western Sudan and the north-eastern part of the Democratic Republic of the Congo. The range probably extends into the Central African Republic.

The wingspan is about 32 mm.

== Etymology ==
The species is named for Philip Enever Winter.
