= Alpenus thomasi =

Scientific classification
- Kingdom: Animalia
- Phylum: Arthropoda
- Class: Insecta
- Order: Lepidoptera
- Superfamily: Noctuoidea
- Family: Erebidae
- Subfamily: Arctiinae
- Genus: Alpenus
- Species: A. thomasi

Binomial name
- Alpenus thomasi Watson, 1989

Species of moth

Alpenus thomasi is a moth of the family Erebidae. It was described by Watson in 1989. It is found in Cameroon, Nigeria and the Central African Republic.
