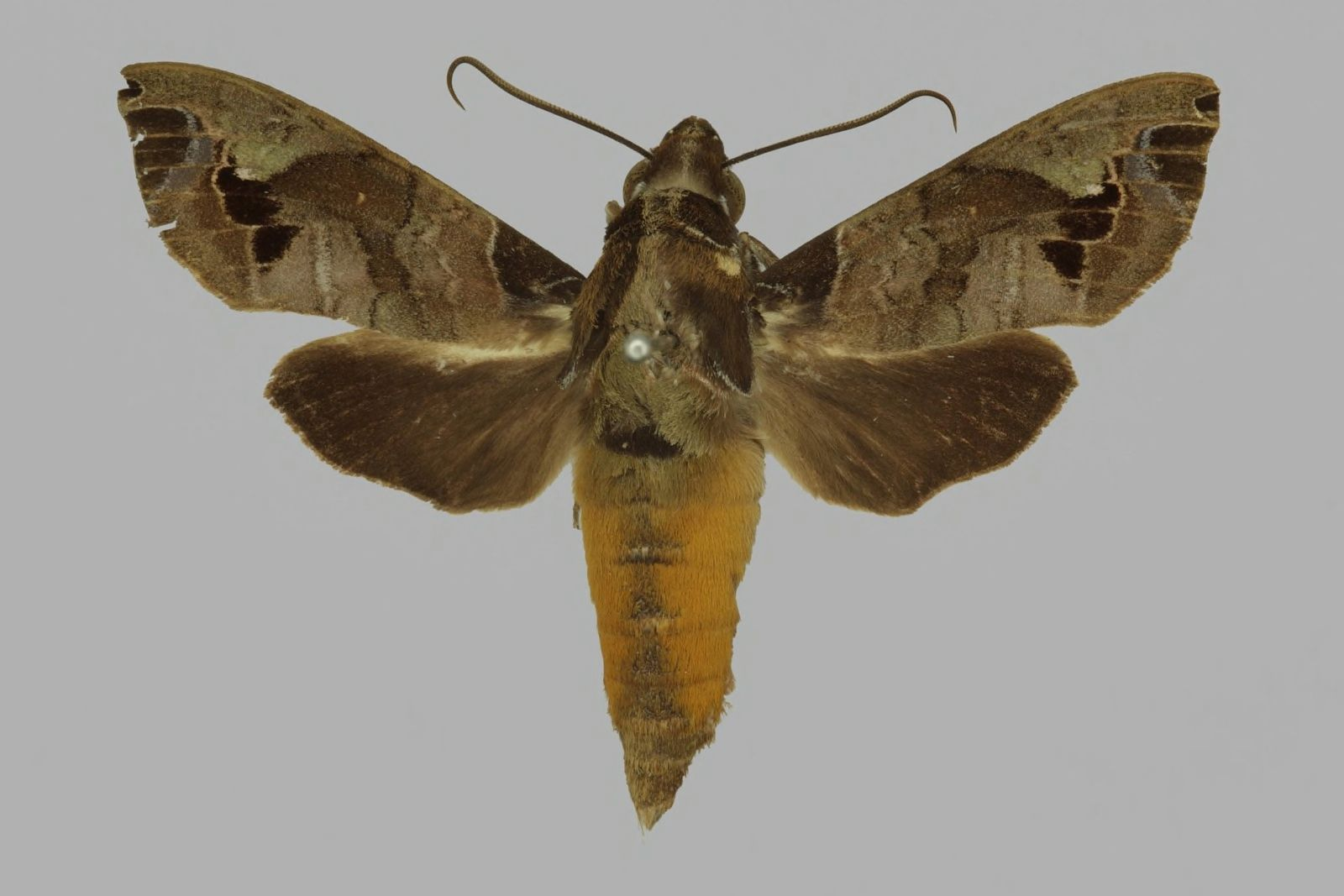
- male, collected in Sierra Leone

Scientific classification
- Domain: Eukaryota
- Kingdom: Animalia
- Phylum: Arthropoda
- Class: Insecta
- Order: Lepidoptera
- Family: Sphingidae
- Genus: Antinephele
- Species: A. maculifera

Binomial name
- Antinephele maculifera Holland, 1889

= Antinephele maculifera =

Species of moth

Antinephele maculifera is a moth of the family Sphingidae. It was described by William Jacob Holland in 1889, and is known from Sierra Leone to the Democratic Republic of the Congo and Uganda. It is also found in Kenya, Malawi, Tanzania and Zimbabwe. It is known from forests and wooded habitats.
