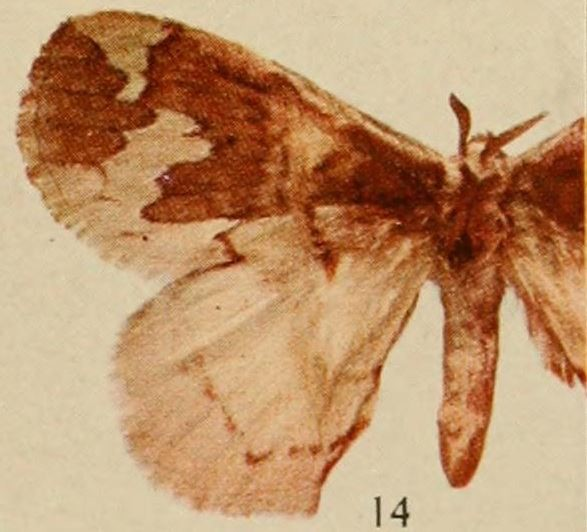

Scientific classification
- Kingdom: Animalia
- Phylum: Arthropoda
- Clade: Pancrustacea
- Class: Insecta
- Order: Lepidoptera
- Family: Eupterotidae
- Genus: Stenoglene
- Species: S. plagiatus

Binomial name
- Stenoglene plagiatus (Aurivillius, 1911)

Synonyms
- Phasicnecus plagiatus Aurivillius, 1911; Phasicnecus grandiplaga Holland, 1920

= Stenoglene plagiatus =

Species of moth

Stenoglene plagiatus is a moth of the family Eupterotidae. It can be found in the Central African Republic, the Democratic Republic of Congo and Ghana.
