= Stenoglene dehanicus =

Scientific classification
- Kingdom: Animalia
- Phylum: Arthropoda
- Clade: Pancrustacea
- Class: Insecta
- Order: Lepidoptera
- Family: Eupterotidae
- Genus: Stenoglene
- Species: S. dehanicus

Binomial name
- Stenoglene dehanicus (Strand, 1911)

Synonyms
- Phasicnemus dehanicus Strand, 1911

Species of moth

Stenoglene dehanicus is a moth in the family Eupterotidae. It was described by Strand E. in 1911. It is found in Cameroon, the Central African Republic and the Democratic Republic of Congo (Orientale).
