= Stenoglene sulphureotinctus =

Scientific classification
- Kingdom: Animalia
- Phylum: Arthropoda
- Clade: Pancrustacea
- Class: Insecta
- Order: Lepidoptera
- Family: Eupterotidae
- Genus: Stenoglene
- Species: S. sulphureotinctus

Binomial name
- Stenoglene sulphureotinctus (Strand, 1912)

Synonyms
- Phasicnecus sulphureotinctus Strand, 1912

Species of moth

Stenoglene sulphureotinctus is a moth in the family Eupterotidae. It was described by Strand in 1912. It is found in the Central African Republic and Equatorial Guinea.
