= Stenoglene thelda =

Scientific classification
- Kingdom: Animalia
- Phylum: Arthropoda
- Class: Insecta
- Order: Lepidoptera
- Family: Eupterotidae
- Genus: Stenoglene
- Species: S. thelda

Binomial name
- Stenoglene thelda (Druce, 1887)

Synonyms
- Chrysopoloma thelda Druce, 1887

Species of moth

Stenoglene thelda is a moth in the family Eupterotidae. It was described by Druce in 1887. It is found in Cameroon, the Central African Republic, the Democratic Republic of Congo (Katanga, Orientale) and Sierra Leone.

== Description ==
The forewings are brownish fawn, thickly irrorated with white scales and with a small V-shaped brown mark on the costal close to the apex, as well as a brown mark along the outer margin. There is a curved line of black lunular-shaped marks extending from the apex to the inner margin above the anal angle. The hindwings are pale yellow, crossed below the middle by two fawn-coloured bands of lunular-shaped marks, the first not reaching the costal margin. There are three patches of dark-brown hairs on the inner margin.
