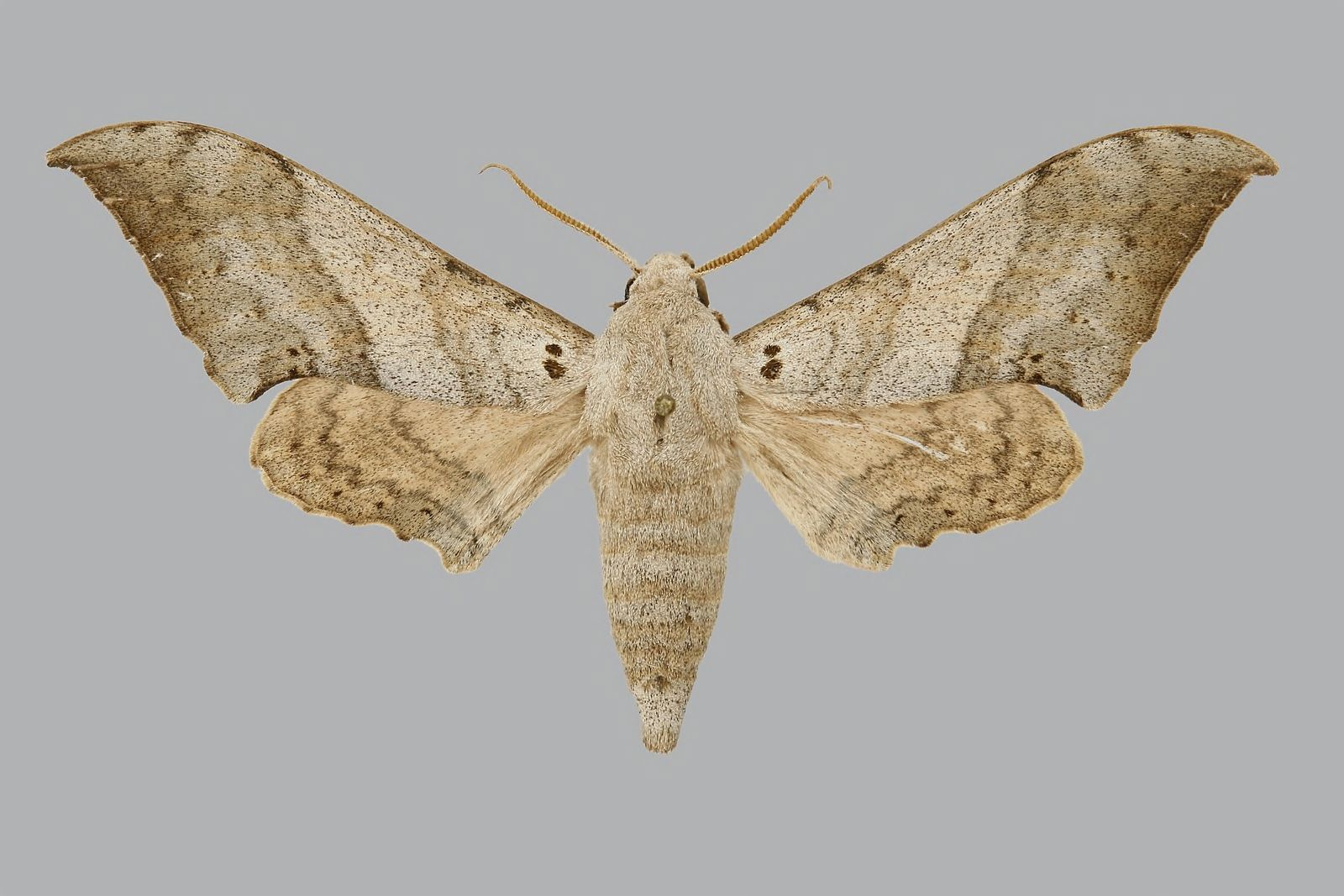

Scientific classification
- Domain: Eukaryota
- Kingdom: Animalia
- Phylum: Arthropoda
- Class: Insecta
- Order: Lepidoptera
- Family: Sphingidae
- Genus: Falcatula
- Species: F. falcatus

Binomial name
- Falcatula falcatus (Rothschild & Jordan, 1903)

Synonyms
- Polyptychus falcatus Rothschild & Jordan, 1903; Falcatula falcata

= Falcatula falcatus =

Species of moth

Falcatula falcatus is a moth of the family Sphingidae. It is known from savanna and woodland from Zimbabwe to Malawi, Mozambique, Zambia, the Central African Republic and eastern Africa.

The length of the forewings is 38–42 mm for females.

The larvae feed on Sclerocarya afra, Erythrina abyssinica and Erythrina excelsa.
