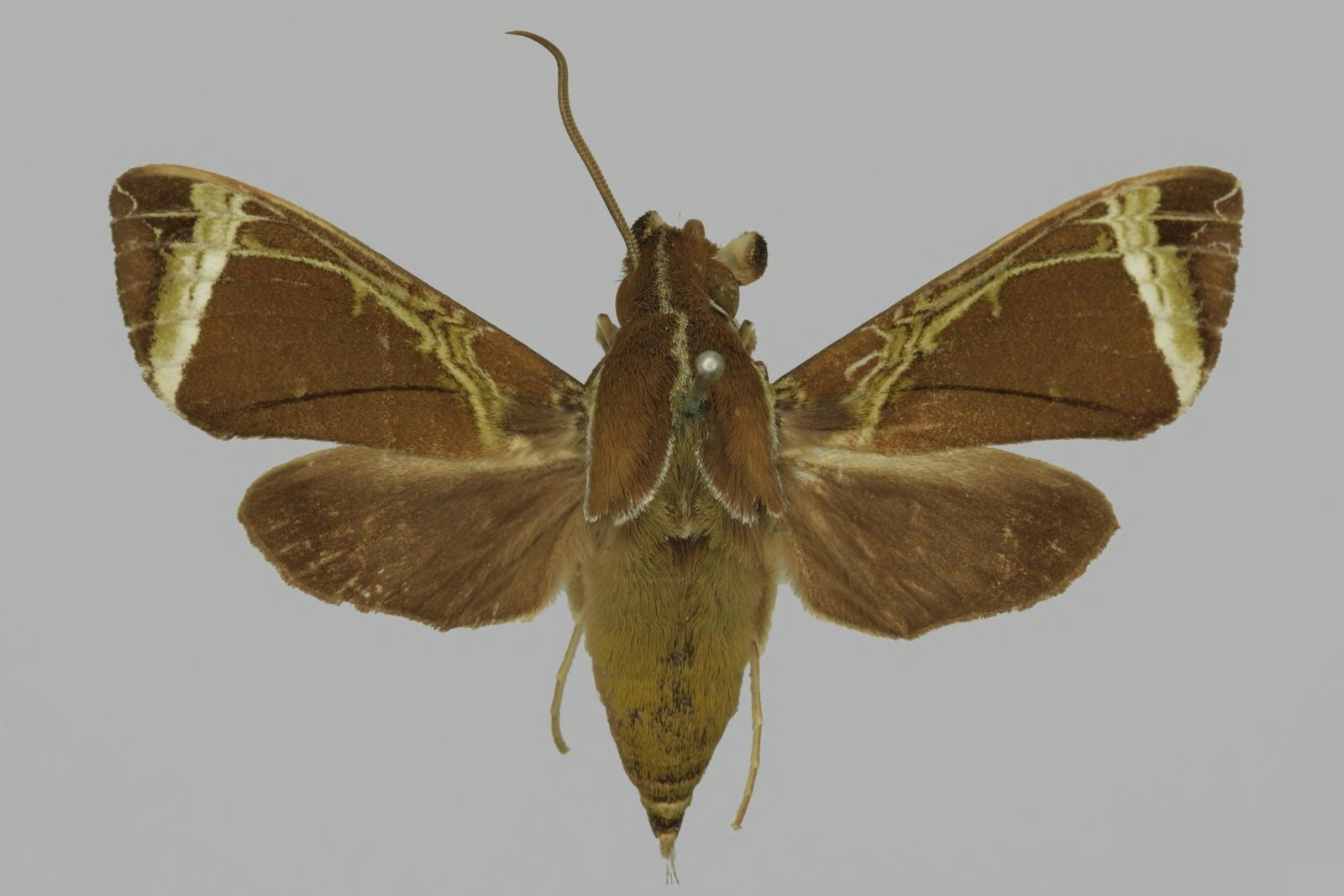
- Male, collected in Uganda

Scientific classification
- Domain: Eukaryota
- Kingdom: Animalia
- Phylum: Arthropoda
- Class: Insecta
- Order: Lepidoptera
- Family: Sphingidae
- Genus: Antinephele
- Species: A. camerounensis

Binomial name
- Antinephele camerounensis Clark, 1937

= Antinephele camerounensis =

Species of moth

Antinephele camerounensis is a moth of the family Sphingidae. It was described by Benjamin Preston Clark in 1937 and is found from Gabon to the Central African Republic, Uganda and Kenya.
