= Stenoglene pujoli =

Scientific classification
- Kingdom: Animalia
- Phylum: Arthropoda
- Clade: Pancrustacea
- Class: Insecta
- Order: Lepidoptera
- Family: Eupterotidae
- Genus: Stenoglene
- Species: S. pujoli

Binomial name
- Stenoglene pujoli Dall'Asta & Poncin, 1980

Species of moth

Stenoglene pujoli is a moth in the family Eupterotidae. It was described by Ugo Dall'Asta and G. Poncin in 1980. It is found in the Central African Republic.
