= Stenoglene uelei =

Scientific classification
- Kingdom: Animalia
- Phylum: Arthropoda
- Class: Insecta
- Order: Lepidoptera
- Family: Eupterotidae
- Genus: Stenoglene
- Species: S. uelei

Binomial name
- Stenoglene uelei Dall'Asta & Poncin, 1980

Species of moth

Stenoglene uelei is a moth in the family Eupterotidae. It was described by Ugo Dall'Asta and G. Poncin in 1980. It is found in the former Orientale Province of the Democratic Republic of the Congo and in the Central African Republic.
