= Alpenus nigropunctatus =

Scientific classification
- Domain: Eukaryota
- Kingdom: Animalia
- Phylum: Arthropoda
- Class: Insecta
- Order: Lepidoptera
- Superfamily: Noctuoidea
- Family: Erebidae
- Subfamily: Arctiinae
- Genus: Alpenus
- Species: A. nigropunctatus

Binomial name
- Alpenus nigropunctatus (Bethune-Baker, 1908)

Synonyms
- Eminaria nigropunctata Bethune-Baker, 1908; Alpenus nigropunctata; Estigmene jacksoni Rothschild, 1910; Spilosoma cincticorpus Hampson, 1920; Spilosoma oligosticta Hampson, 1920; Acantharctia antemediata Rothschild, 1933

Species of moth

Alpenus nigropunctatus is a moth of the family Erebidae. It was described by George Thomas Bethune-Baker in 1908. It is found in Ghana, Nigeria, Sudan, Somalia, Ethiopia, Kenya and Uganda.

The larvae feed on Gossypium species.
