= Moyencharia mineti =

Scientific classification
- Domain: Eukaryota
- Kingdom: Animalia
- Phylum: Arthropoda
- Class: Insecta
- Order: Lepidoptera
- Family: Cossidae
- Genus: Moyencharia
- Species: M. mineti

Binomial name
- Moyencharia mineti Lehmann, 2013

Species of moth

Moyencharia mineti is a moth of the family Cossidae. It is found in southern Chad and probably also the Central African Republic. The habitat consists of a mosaic of riparian forests, open woodland and wooded floodplain grassland at low elevations.

The wingspan is about 20 mm for males and 32 mm for females.

== Etymology ==
The species is named for Professor Dr Joël Minet.
