= Stenoglene uniformis =

Scientific classification
- Kingdom: Animalia
- Phylum: Arthropoda
- Clade: Pancrustacea
- Class: Insecta
- Order: Lepidoptera
- Family: Eupterotidae
- Genus: Stenoglene
- Species: S. uniformis

Binomial name
- Stenoglene uniformis Dall'Asta & Poncin, 1980

Species of moth

Stenoglene uniformis is a moth in the family Eupterotidae. It was described by Ugo Dall'Asta and G. Poncin in 1980. It is found in the former Orientale Province of the Democratic Republic of the Congo and in the Central African Republic.
