= Donaspastus ubangi =

Scientific classification
- Kingdom: Animalia
- Phylum: Arthropoda
- Clade: Pancrustacea
- Class: Insecta
- Order: Lepidoptera
- Family: Autostichidae
- Genus: Donaspastus
- Species: D. ubangi

Binomial name
- Donaspastus ubangi (Gozmány, 1966)

Synonyms
- Neospastus ubangi Gozmány, 1966

Species of moth

Donaspastus ubangi is a moth in the family Autostichidae. It was described by László Anthony Gozmány in 1966. It is found in the Central African Republic.
