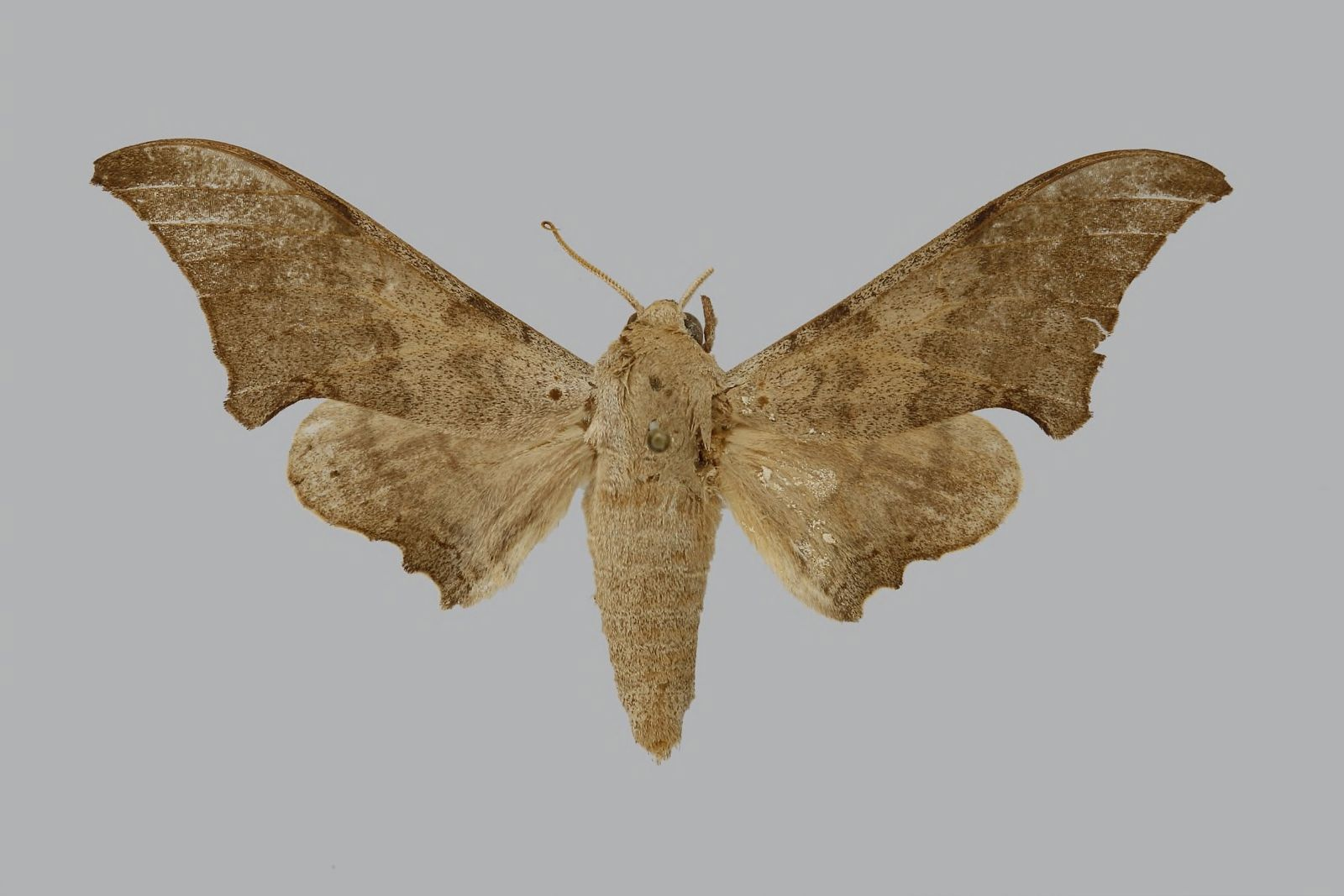

Scientific classification
- Kingdom: Animalia
- Phylum: Arthropoda
- Class: Insecta
- Order: Lepidoptera
- Family: Sphingidae
- Genus: Falcatula
- Species: F. cymatodes

Binomial name
- Falcatula cymatodes Rothschild & Jordan, 1912

Synonyms
- Polyptychus cymatodes Rothchild & Jordan, 1912

= Falcatula cymatodes =

Species of moth

Falcatula cymatodes is a moth of the family Sphingidae. It is known from lowland forests in Ivory Coast, Ghana, Nigeria, Cameroon, Gabon, Uganda, and the Central African Republic.

The length of the forewings is 28–32 mm for males and 34–38 mm for females.

== Subspecies ==
- Falcatula cymatodes cymatodes
- Falcatula cymatodes lemairei Darge, 1973 (Cameroon)
