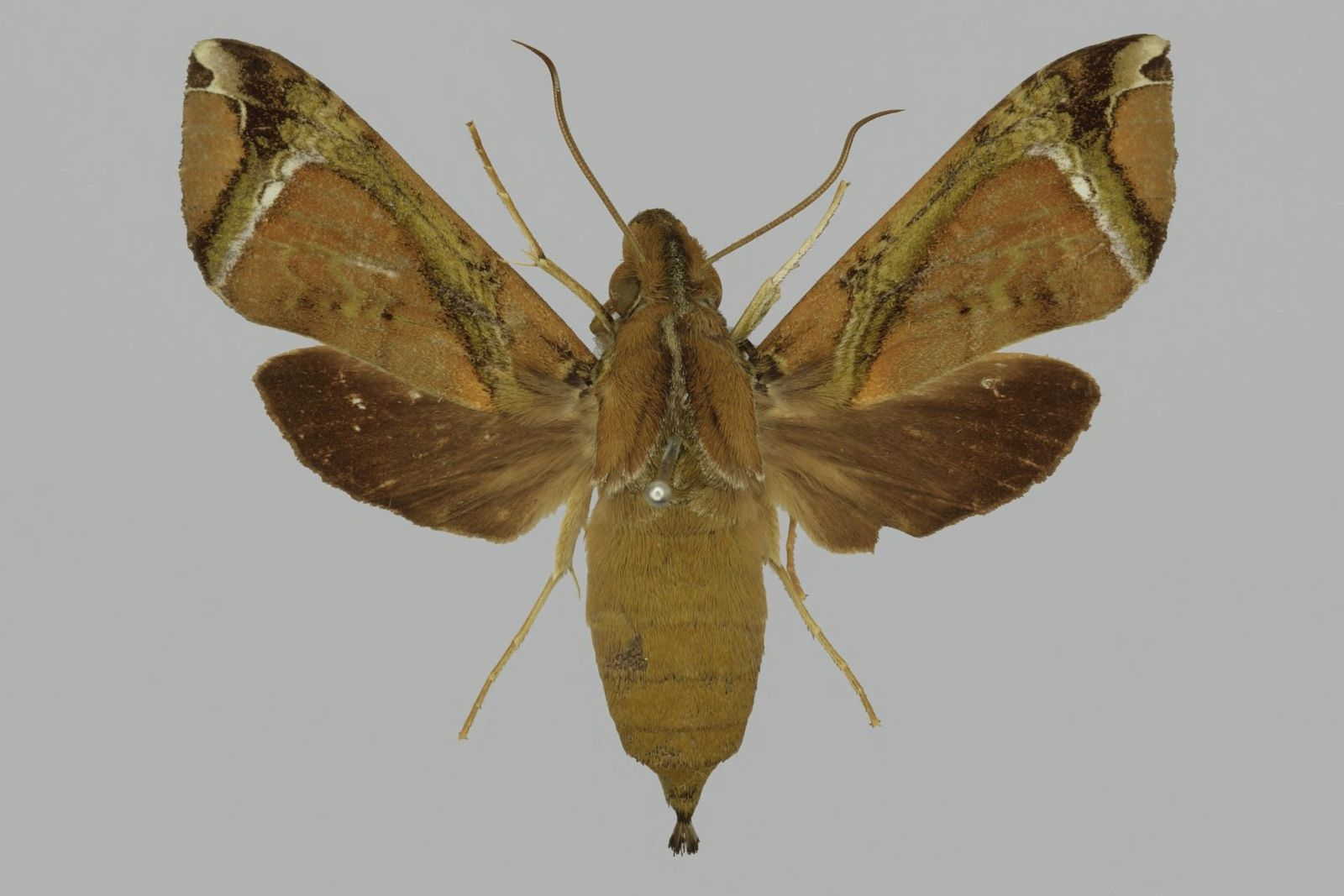
- Female, collected in Mukono

Scientific classification
- Domain: Eukaryota
- Kingdom: Animalia
- Phylum: Arthropoda
- Class: Insecta
- Order: Lepidoptera
- Family: Sphingidae
- Genus: Antinephele
- Species: A. marcida

Binomial name
- Antinephele marcida Holland, 1893

= Antinephele marcida =

Species of moth

Antinephele marcida is a moth of the family Sphingidae. It was described by William Jacob Holland in 1893, and is found from forests from Cameroon to Uganda and western Kenya.

The length of the forewings is 23–26 mm. The upperside of the forewings has a pale brownish-green ground colour (fading to orange-brown).
