= Stenoglene preussi =

Scientific classification
- Kingdom: Animalia
- Phylum: Arthropoda
- Clade: Pancrustacea
- Class: Insecta
- Order: Lepidoptera
- Family: Eupterotidae
- Genus: Stenoglene
- Species: S. preussi

Binomial name
- Stenoglene preussi (Aurivillius, 1893)

Synonyms
- Jana preussi Aurivillius, 1893

Species of moth

Stenoglene preussi is a moth in the family Eupterotidae. It was described by Per Olof Christopher Aurivillius in 1893. It is found in Cameroon, the Central African Republic, the Democratic Republic of the Congo (Orientale, North Kivu) and Kenya.
