= Stenoglene brunneofasciata =

Scientific classification
- Kingdom: Animalia
- Phylum: Arthropoda
- Clade: Pancrustacea
- Class: Insecta
- Order: Lepidoptera
- Family: Eupterotidae
- Genus: Stenoglene
- Species: S. brunneofasciata

Binomial name
- Stenoglene brunneofasciata Dall'Asta & Poncin, 1980

Species of moth

Stenoglene brunneofasciata is a moth in the family Eupterotidae. It was described by Ugo Dall'Asta and G. Poncin in 1980. It is found in the Central African Republic and the former Orientale Province of the Democratic Republic of the Congo.
