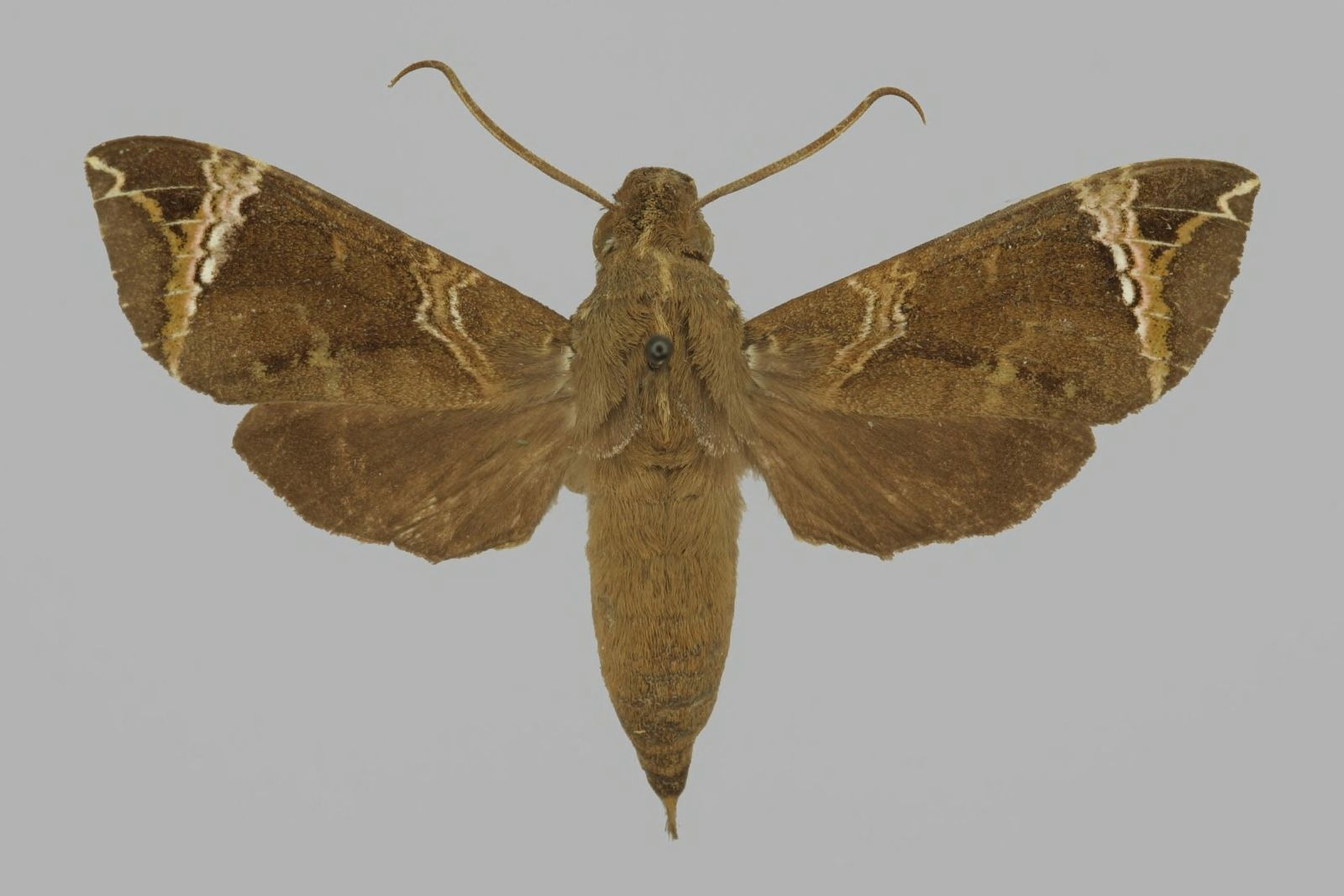
- Male, collected in Entebbe
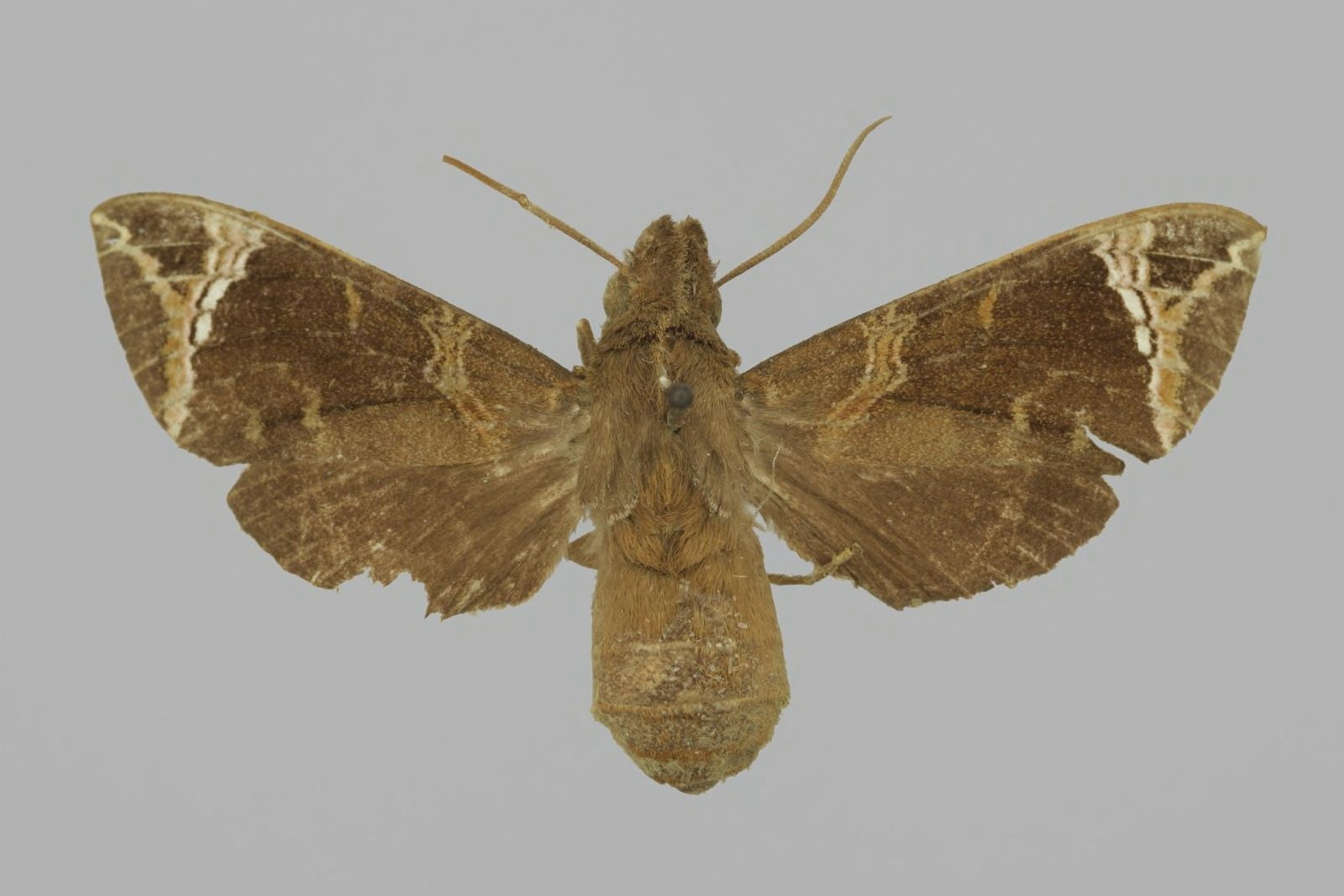
- Female, collected in Entebbe

Scientific classification
- Domain: Eukaryota
- Kingdom: Animalia
- Phylum: Arthropoda
- Class: Insecta
- Order: Lepidoptera
- Family: Sphingidae
- Genus: Antinephele
- Species: A. achlora

Binomial name
- Antinephele achlora Holland, 1892

= Antinephele achlora =

Species of moth

Antinephele achlora is a moth of the family Sphingidae. It was described by William Jacob Holland in 1892, and is found from forests from Sierra Leone to Uganda and western Kenya.
