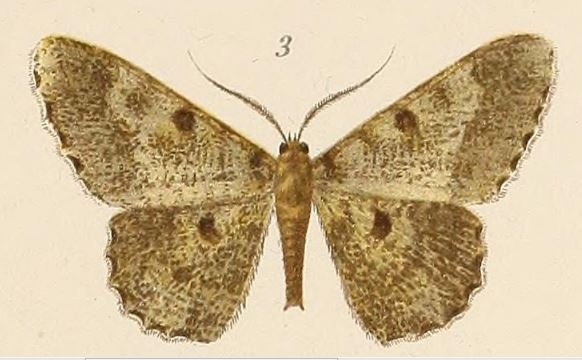

Scientific classification
- Domain: Eukaryota
- Kingdom: Animalia
- Phylum: Arthropoda
- Class: Insecta
- Order: Lepidoptera
- Family: Geometridae
- Genus: Racotis
- Species: R. squalida

Binomial name
- Racotis squalida (Butler, 1878)

Synonyms
- Ophthalmodes squalida Butler, 1878; Racotis voeltzkowii Pagenstecher, 1907; Racotis sinuosa Warren, 1894

= Racotis squalida =

Species of moth

Racotis squalida is a species of moth of the family Geometridae first described by Arthur Gardiner Butler in 1878. It is found in central, eastern and southern Africa.

== Subspecies ==
- Racotis squalida squalida (Butler, 1878)
- Racotis squalida uhligi (Strand, 1909)
