= Semioptila lufirensis =

Scientific classification
- Domain: Eukaryota
- Kingdom: Animalia
- Phylum: Arthropoda
- Class: Insecta
- Order: Lepidoptera
- Family: Himantopteridae
- Genus: Semioptila
- Species: S. lufirensis

Binomial name
- Semioptila lufirensis Joicey & Talbot, 1921

Species of moth

Semioptila lufirensis is a moth in the Himantopteridae family. It was described by James John Joicey and George Talbot in 1921. It is found in Katanga Province in the Democratic Republic of the Congo.

The length of the forewings is about 15 mm. The species is allied to Semioptila hilaris and Semioptila flavidiscata. It resembles the latter in general appearance, but the two submedian veins of the forewings are strongly marked, as in S. hilaris. The forewing cell-streak does not reach the end of the cell and does not touch the discocellular spot. Cellule lb is not entirely filled in with yellow, the angle formed by the junction of the submedian and the margin being of the ground colour. Cellule lc is yellow in the basal half. The allied forms have la-lc entirely yellow. The hindwings are larger than in the allied forms and with a longer and more spatulate tail, which is broader than in any other species.
