= Himantopterus fuscinervis =

Scientific classification
- Domain: Eukaryota
- Kingdom: Animalia
- Phylum: Arthropoda
- Class: Insecta
- Order: Lepidoptera
- Family: Himantopteridae
- Genus: Himantopterus
- Species: H. fuscinervis

Binomial name
- Himantopterus fuscinervis Wesmael, 1836

Species of moth

Himantopterus fuscinervis is a moth in the family Himantopteridae. It was described by Constantin Wesmael in 1836. It is found on Sumatra and Java and in Malaysia.

The larvae have been recorded feeding on Shorea platyclados (now Rubroshorea platyclados).
