= Pedoptila nigrocristata =

Scientific classification
- Domain: Eukaryota
- Kingdom: Animalia
- Phylum: Arthropoda
- Class: Insecta
- Order: Lepidoptera
- Family: Himantopteridae
- Genus: Pedoptila
- Species: P. nigrocristata

Binomial name
- Pedoptila nigrocristata Joicey & Talbot, 1921

Species of moth

Pedoptila nigrocristata is a moth in the Himantopteridae family. It was described by James John Joicey and George Talbot in 1921. It is found in Zambia.

The length of the forewings is about 14 mm. The forewings have the upper discocellular as long as the middle one, more oblique than in other species and scarcely angled at vein 6. The basal yellow area is broader costally than in Pedoptila catori and its outer edge is concave. The hindwings are as in P. catori, but the tail is black and not fringed with whitish as in that species. The body and appendages are as in P. catori, but with the difference that the frons is black, the tarsi are black, and the anal tuft is blackish brown.
