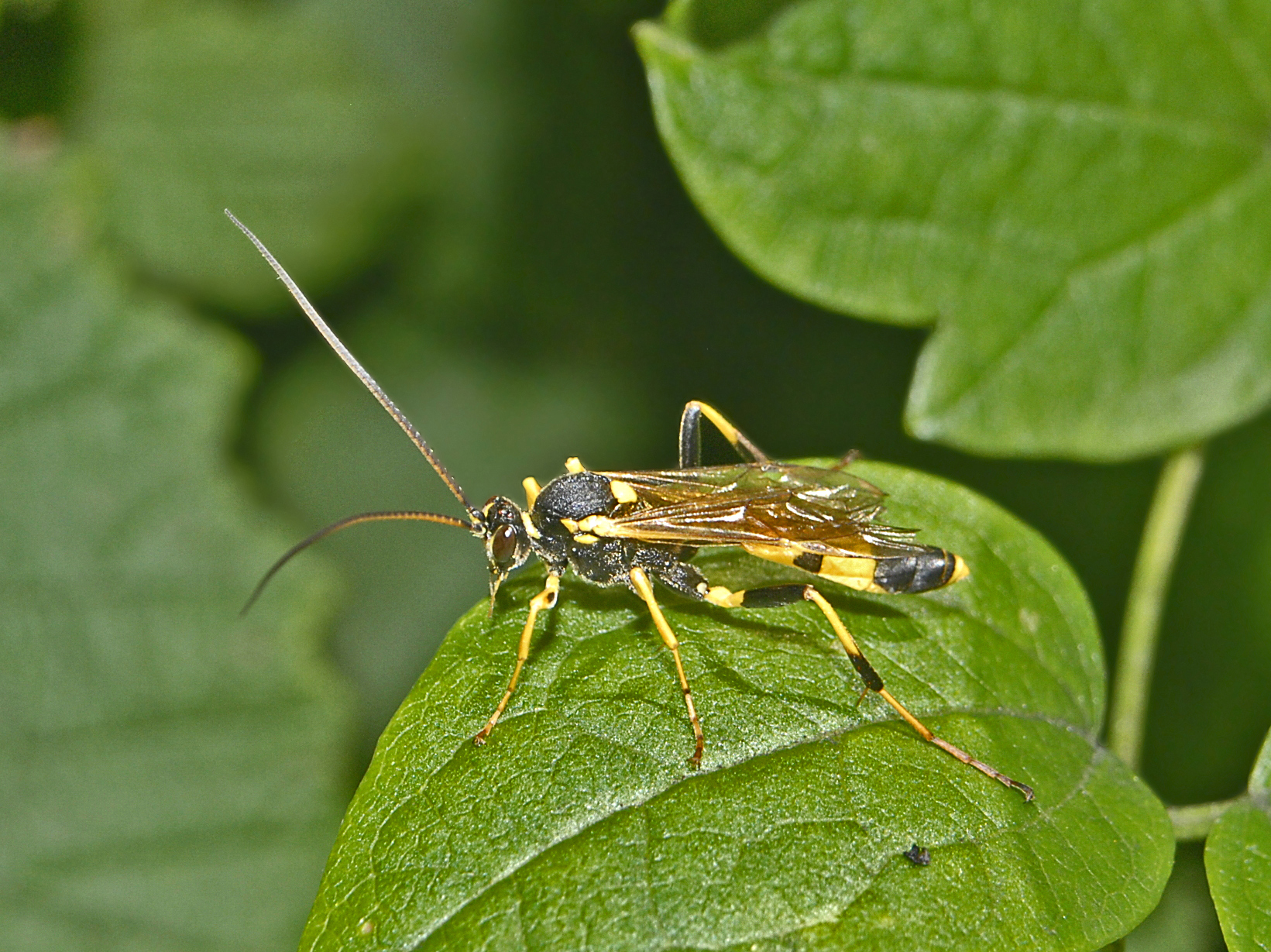
- Amblyteles armatorius

Scientific classification
- Kingdom: Animalia
- Phylum: Arthropoda
- Clade: Pancrustacea
- Class: Insecta
- Order: Hymenoptera
- Family: Ichneumonidae
- Subfamily: Ichneumoninae
- Genus: Amblyteles; Wesmael, 1844

= Amblyteles =

Genus of wasps

Amblyteles is a genus of parasitic wasps in the family Ichneumonidae.

== Distribution ==
Amblyteles is present in the Palearctic realm and Asia.

== Species ==
- Amblyteles armatorius (Förster, 1771)
- Amblyteles pealei Cockerell, 1927 † (extinct)
- Amblyteles sonani Uchida, 1932
