= Semioptila hyalina =

Scientific classification
- Kingdom: Animalia
- Phylum: Arthropoda
- Class: Insecta
- Order: Lepidoptera
- Family: Himantopteridae
- Genus: Semioptila
- Species: S. hyalina

Binomial name
- Semioptila hyalina Talbot, 1926

Species of moth

Semioptila hyalina is a moth in the Himantopteridae family. It was described by George Talbot in 1926. It is found in Kasai-Oriental in the Democratic Republic of the Congo.
