= Staphylinochrous pygmaea =

Scientific classification
- Kingdom: Animalia
- Phylum: Arthropoda
- Class: Insecta
- Order: Lepidoptera
- Family: Himantopteridae
- Subfamily: Anomoeotinae
- Genus: Staphylinochrous
- Species: S. pygmaea

Binomial name
- Staphylinochrous pygmaea Bethune-Baker, 1911

Species of moth

Staphylinochrous pygmaea is a species of long-tailed burnet moth in the family Himantopteridae, found in Nigeria.

== Subspecies ==
These two subspecies belong to the species Staphylinochrous pygmaea:

- Staphylinochrous pygmaea defasciata Hering, 1937
- Staphylinochrous pygmaea pygmaea
