= Staphylinochrous holotherma =

Scientific classification
- Kingdom: Animalia
- Phylum: Arthropoda
- Class: Insecta
- Order: Lepidoptera
- Family: Himantopteridae
- Subfamily: Anomoeotinae
- Genus: Staphylinochrous
- Species: S. holotherma

Binomial name
- Staphylinochrous holotherma Hampson, 1920

Species of moth

Staphylinochrous holotherma is a species of long-tailed burnet moth in the family Himantopteridae, found in Kenya.
