= Staphylinochrous sagittata =

Scientific classification
- Kingdom: Animalia
- Phylum: Arthropoda
- Class: Insecta
- Order: Lepidoptera
- Family: Himantopteridae
- Subfamily: Anomoeotinae
- Genus: Staphylinochrous
- Species: S. sagittata

Binomial name
- Staphylinochrous sagittata Hering, 1937

Species of moth

Staphylinochrous sagittata is a species of long-tailed burnet moth in the family Himantopteridae, found in Sub-Saharan Africa.
