= Semioptila lydia =

Scientific classification
- Kingdom: Animalia
- Phylum: Arthropoda
- Clade: Pancrustacea
- Class: Insecta
- Order: Lepidoptera
- Family: Himantopteridae
- Genus: Semioptila
- Species: S. lydia

Binomial name
- Semioptila lydia Weymer, 1908

Species of moth

Semioptila lydia is a moth in the Himantopteridae family. It was described by Gustav Weymer in 1908. It is found in Angola.
