= Semioptila marshalli =

Scientific classification
- Domain: Eukaryota
- Kingdom: Animalia
- Phylum: Arthropoda
- Class: Insecta
- Order: Lepidoptera
- Family: Himantopteridae
- Genus: Semioptila
- Species: S. marshalli

Binomial name
- Semioptila marshalli Rothschild, 1907

Species of moth

Semioptila marshalli is a moth in the Himantopteridae family. It was described by Walter Rothschild in 1907. It is found in South Africa and Zimbabwe. It is named for Guy Anstruther Knox Marshall, the collector of the type series.

The body is pale yellow and the antenna, frons, breast, legs and a stripe on the underside of the abdomen are blackish. The forewings are pale yellow from the base beyond the apex of the cell, the yellow scaling diffuse distally, reaching posteriorly to the outer edge of the wing, the veins being blackish. At the apex of the cell is a small yellow spot. The hindwings gradually narrow from the base to the tip, with a small yellow spot in the middle.
