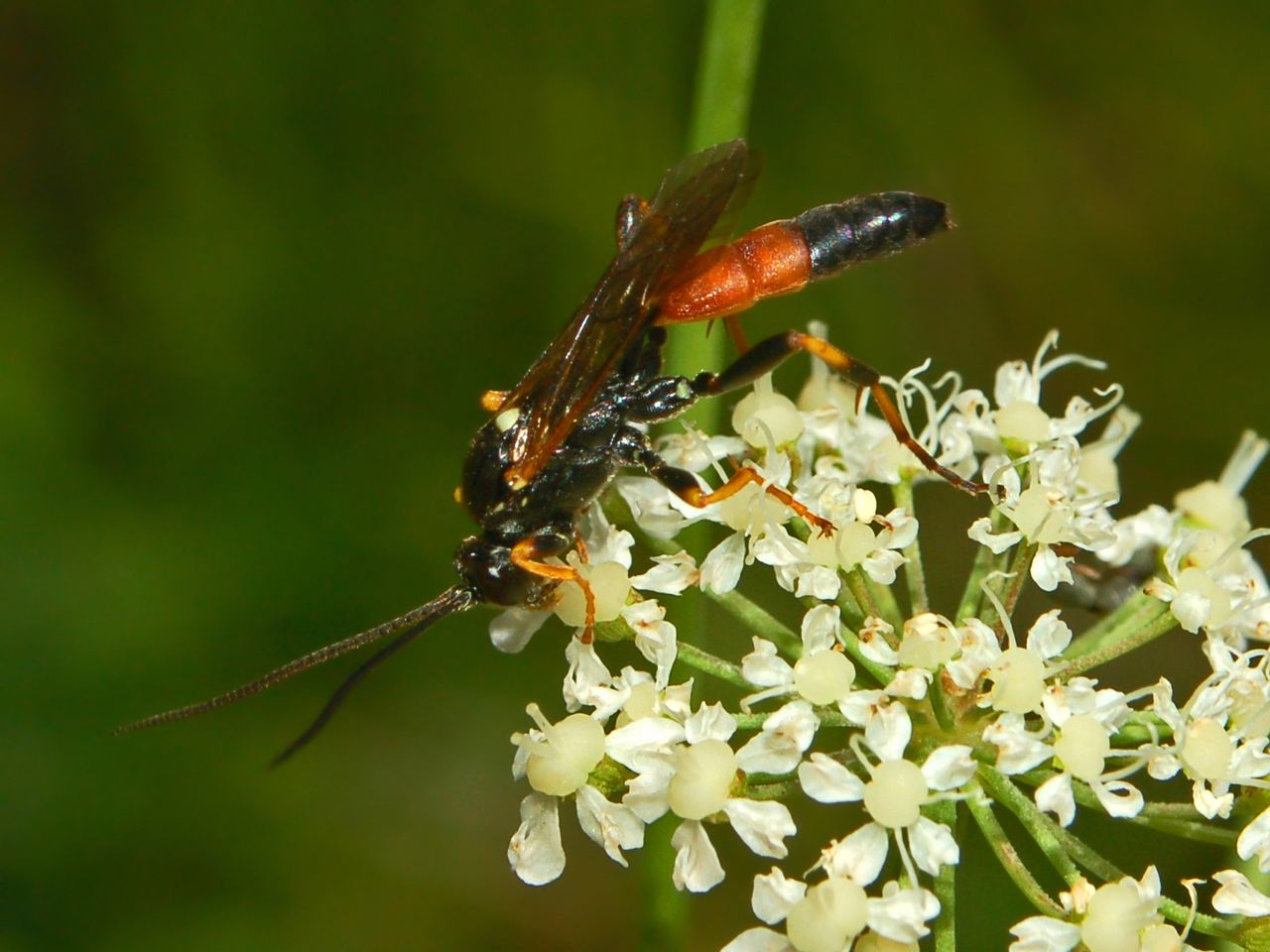
- Ichneumon insidiosus – Male

Scientific classification
- Kingdom: Animalia
- Phylum: Arthropoda
- Clade: Pancrustacea
- Class: Insecta
- Order: Hymenoptera
- Family: Ichneumonidae
- Subfamily: Ichneumoninae
- Genus: Ichneumon; Linnaeus, 1758

Synonyms
- Colobacis Cameron, 1901; Coreojoppa Uchida, 1926; Euichneumon Berthoumieu, 1904; Matsumuraius Ashmead, 1906; Pterocormus Foerster, 1850; Tyanites Cameron, 1903; Vabsaris Cameron, 1903; Brachypterus Gravenhorst, 1829

= Ichneumon (genus) =

Genus of wasps

Ichneumon is a genus of parasitoid wasps in the family Ichneumonidae.

== Selected species ==
This genus includes about 270 species:

- Ichneumon annulatorius Fabricius, 1775
- Ichneumon eumerus Wesmael, 1857
- Ichneumon extensorius Linnaeus, 1758
- Ichneumon insidiosus Wesmael, 1844
- Ichneumon nyassae Heinrich, 1967
- Ichneumon rubriornatus Cameron, 1904
- Ichneumon sarcitorius Linnaeus, 1758
- Ichneumon tottor Thunberg, 1822
- Ichneumon unicinctus Brullé, 1846
- Ichneumon centrator Say, 1825

== Cultural significance ==
In the eighteenth century Ichneumon was regarded as an instance of the God-given balance in nature; in the nineteenth the possibility of using it as a form of biocontrol was briefly entertained. It was used as the symbol of the reformed Entomological Society of London in 1833.

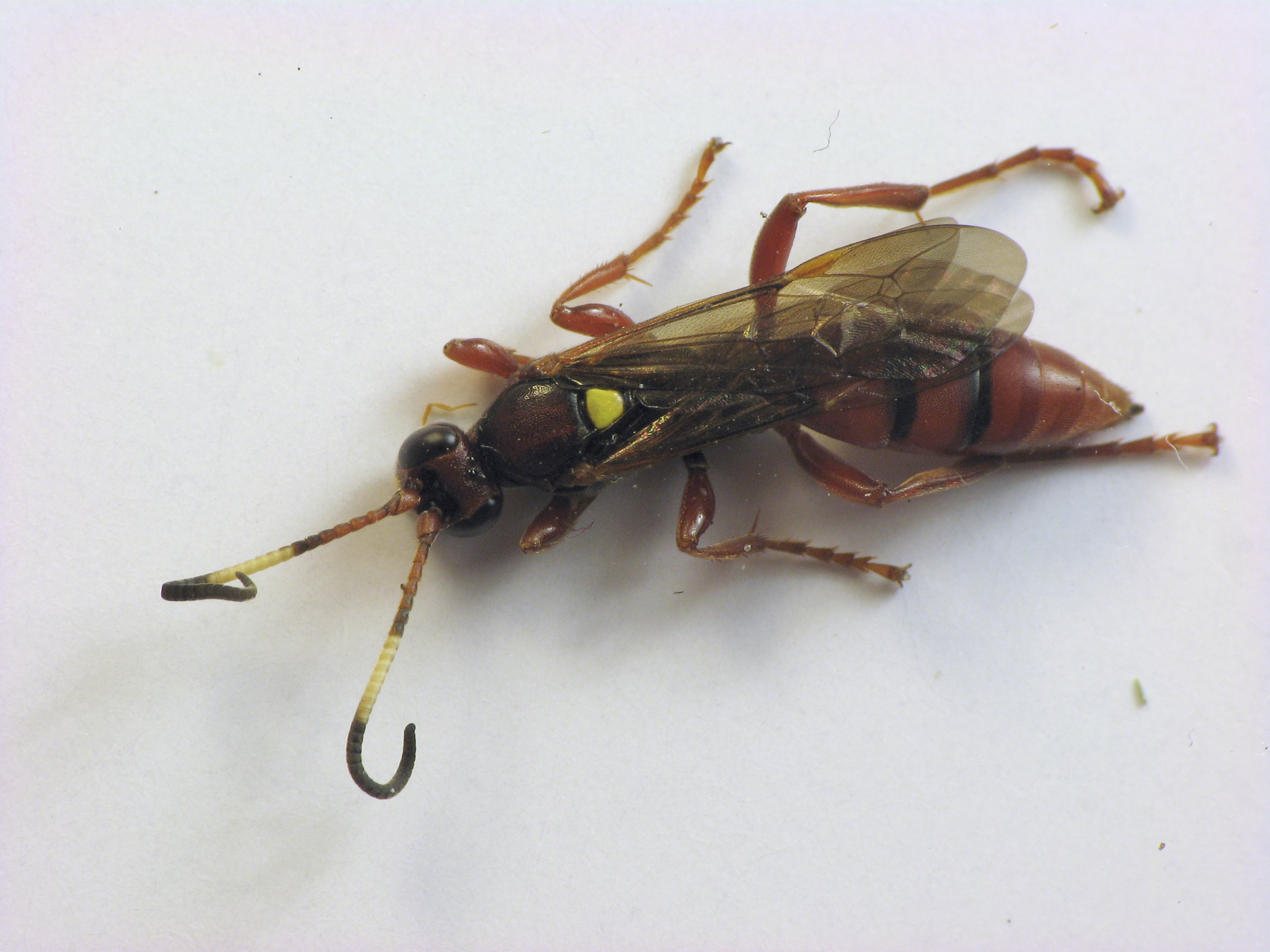
Ichneumon laetus female

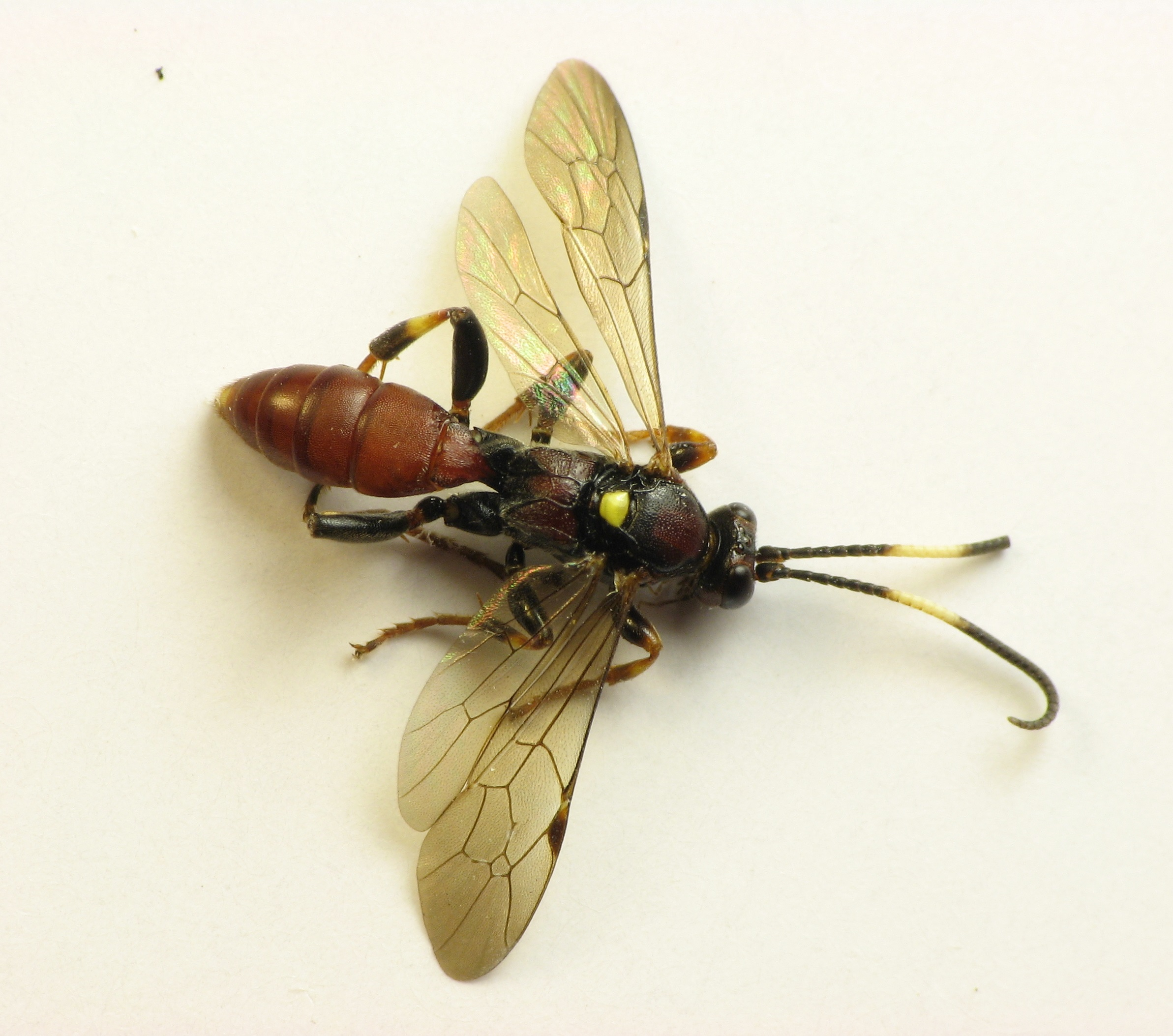
Ichneumon ultimus female

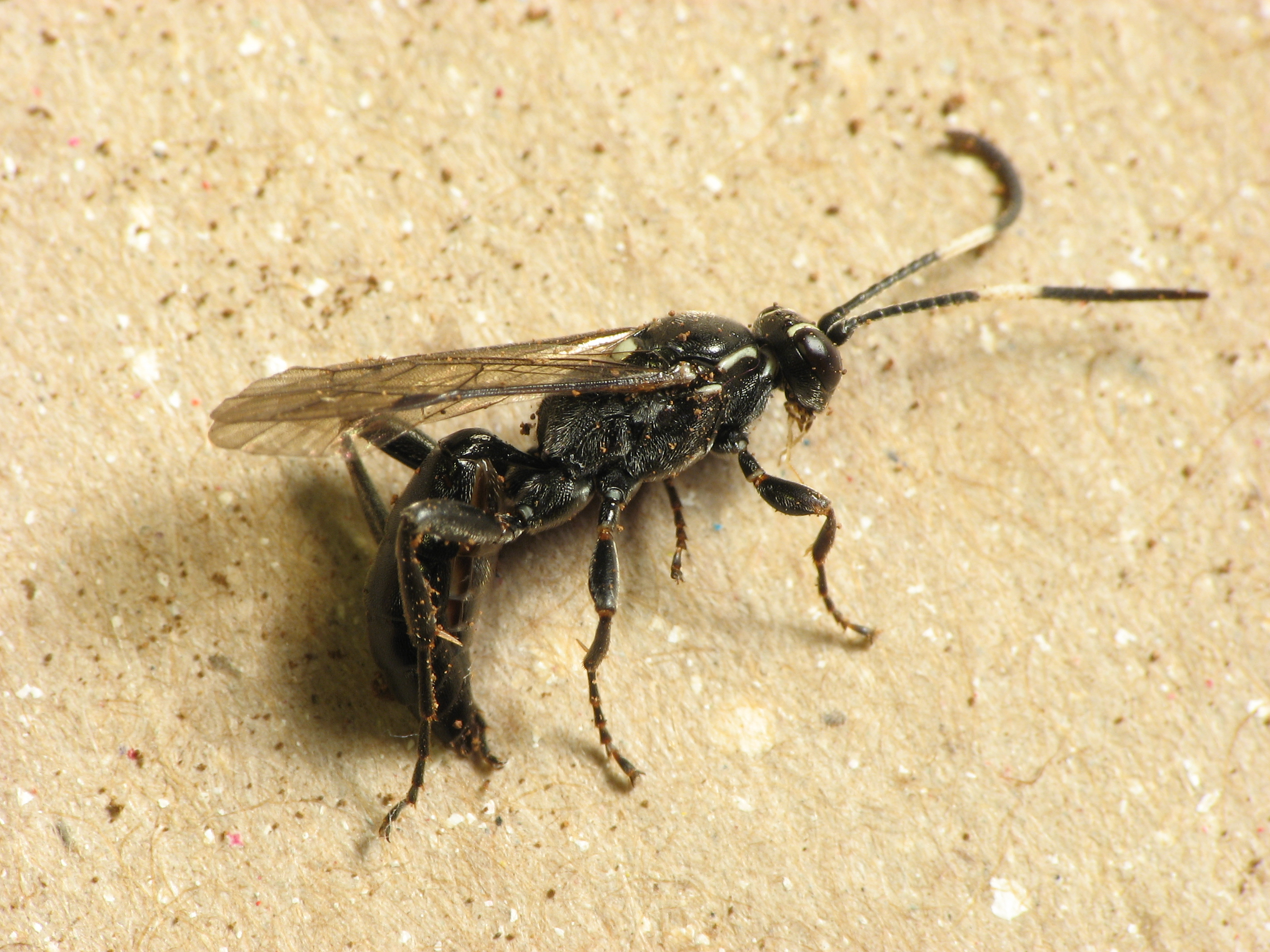
Ichneumon mendax female
