= Staphylinochrous flavida =

Scientific classification
- Kingdom: Animalia
- Phylum: Arthropoda
- Class: Insecta
- Order: Lepidoptera
- Family: Himantopteridae
- Subfamily: Anomoeotinae
- Genus: Staphylinochrous
- Species: S. flavida

Binomial name
- Staphylinochrous flavida Hampson, 1920

Species of moth

Staphylinochrous flavida is a species of long-tailed burnet moth in the family Himantopteridae, found in the Democratic Republic of the Congo and Uganda.

== Subspecies ==
These two subspecies belong to the species Staphylinochrous flavida:

- Staphylinochrous flavida erythrocha Hering, 1929
- Staphylinochrous flavida flavida
