= Doratopteryx flavomaculata =

Scientific classification
- Domain: Eukaryota
- Kingdom: Animalia
- Phylum: Arthropoda
- Class: Insecta
- Order: Lepidoptera
- Family: Himantopteridae
- Genus: Doratopteryx
- Species: D. flavomaculata

Binomial name
- Doratopteryx flavomaculata Hering, 1937

Species of moth

Doratopteryx flavomaculata is a moth in the Himantopteridae family. It was described by Hering in 1937. It is found in the Democratic Republic of the Congo (West Kasai).
