= Himantopterus dohertyi =

Scientific classification
- Domain: Eukaryota
- Kingdom: Animalia
- Phylum: Arthropoda
- Class: Insecta
- Order: Lepidoptera
- Family: Himantopteridae
- Genus: Himantopterus
- Species: H. dohertyi

Binomial name
- Himantopterus dohertyi (Elwes, 1890)

Synonyms
- Thymara dohertyi Elwes, 1890; Himantopterus dohertyi elwesi Jordan, 1907

Species of moth

Himantopterus dohertyi is a moth in the family Himantopteridae. It was described by Henry John Elwes in 1890. It is found in India.

The antennae of the males are broadly pectinate, the pectens minutely hairy and black. The antennae of the females are clothed with short spiny hairs. They are black, but yellowish at the base. The head is black and the neck and thorax are covered with coarse dark orange hairs, which also clothe the breast, base of the wings and abdomen, and in the male, are continued down the upper half of the hindwings, where they apparently take the form of scales. The remainder of the wings are apparently devoid of scales, but clothed with black hairs, thickest on the veins and center of the hindwings, where they are a good deal mixed with the yellow scales on the veins and inner margin. Towards the end of the hindwings (in both sexes), a few grey or pale yellowish hairs appear. The fringes of both wings consist of the same black hairs.
