= Staphylinochrous melanoleuca =

Scientific classification
- Kingdom: Animalia
- Phylum: Arthropoda
- Class: Insecta
- Order: Lepidoptera
- Family: Himantopteridae
- Subfamily: Anomoeotinae
- Genus: Staphylinochrous
- Species: S. melanoleuca

Binomial name
- Staphylinochrous melanoleuca Hampson, 1910

Species of moth

Staphylinochrous melanoleuca is a species of long-tailed burnet moth in the family Himantopteridae, found in Uganda.
