= Doratopteryx afra =

Scientific classification
- Domain: Eukaryota
- Kingdom: Animalia
- Phylum: Arthropoda
- Class: Insecta
- Order: Lepidoptera
- Family: Himantopteridae
- Genus: Doratopteryx
- Species: D. afra

Binomial name
- Doratopteryx afra Rogenhofer, 1884

Species of moth

Doratopteryx afra is a moth in the Himantopteridae family. It was described by Alois Friedrich Rogenhofer in 1884. It is found in South Africa and Tanzania.
