= Semioptila dolicholoba =

Scientific classification
- Kingdom: Animalia
- Phylum: Arthropoda
- Class: Insecta
- Order: Lepidoptera
- Family: Himantopteridae
- Genus: Semioptila
- Species: S. dolicholoba

Binomial name
- Semioptila dolicholoba Hampson, 1920

Species of moth

Semioptila dolicholoba is a moth in the Himantopteridae family. It was described by George Hampson in 1920. It is found in Malawi.

The wingspan is 24–26 mm. The head, thorax and abdomen are fulvous (tawny) orange, the last dorsally suffused with chocolate brown except the terminal segment. The antennae are black brown and the legs are brown. The forewings are fulvous orange below the costa to near the end of the cell, in the cell to the origin of vein 2 and below vein 2 to the termen, the costa and rest of the wing are dark brown, leaving a little orange above the base of vein 2 and at the termen extending to just below vein 2. A round fulvous-orange spot is found beyond the discocellulars. The hindwings are fulvous orange to the lobe, then black brown with a large, somewhat elliptical fulvous-orange spot on the lobe, its inner edge produced inwards to a spur above vein 4.
