= Doratopteryx plumigera =

Scientific classification
- Domain: Eukaryota
- Kingdom: Animalia
- Phylum: Arthropoda
- Class: Insecta
- Order: Lepidoptera
- Family: Himantopteridae
- Genus: Doratopteryx
- Species: D. plumigera

Binomial name
- Doratopteryx plumigera Butler, 1888

Species of moth

Doratopteryx plumigera is a moth in the Himantopteridae family. It was described by Arthur Gardiner Butler in 1888. It is found in South Africa and Tanzania.

The wingspan is 13–20 mm. The forewings are semitransparent fuliginous grey with the discoidal cell and interno-basal half golden fulvous. The veins are black. The hindwings are golden fulvous to the commencement of the tail, the latter blackish, crossed by a belt of ochreous at the commencement of its expansion, which is beyond the middle. The head and thorax are shining pitch-brown and the collar and two spots on the prothorax orange. The abdomen is dull orange and the legs are brown.
