= Staphylinochrous =

Scientific classification
- Kingdom: Animalia
- Phylum: Arthropoda
- Clade: Pancrustacea
- Class: Insecta
- Order: Lepidoptera
- Family: Himantopteridae
- Subfamily: Anomoeotinae
- Genus: Staphylinochrous; Butler, 1894

Genus of moths

Staphylinochrous is a genus of long-tailed burnet moths in the family Himantopteridae. There are about 19 described species in Staphylinochrous, found in Sub-Saharan Africa.

== Species ==
These 19 species belong to the genus Staphylinochrous:

- Staphylinochrous albabasis Bethune-Baker, 1911
- Staphylinochrous angustifascia Hering, 1937
- Staphylinochrous approximata Hering, 1937
- Staphylinochrous elongata Hering, 1937
- Staphylinochrous euriphaea Hampson, 1919
- Staphylinochrous euryperalis Hampson, 1910
- Staphylinochrous flavida Hampson, 1919
- Staphylinochrous fulva Hampson, 1910
- Staphylinochrous heringi Alberti, 1954
- Staphylinochrous holotherma Hampson, 1919
- Staphylinochrous longipennis Hering, 1937
- Staphylinochrous meinickei (Hering, 1928)
- Staphylinochrous melanoleuca Hampson, 1910
- Staphylinochrous pygmaea Bethune-Baker, 1911
- Staphylinochrous ruficilia Hampson, 1919
- Staphylinochrous sagittata Hering, 1937
- Staphylinochrous sordida Hering, 1937
- Staphylinochrous ugandensis Hering, 1937
- Staphylinochrous whytei Butler, 1894
