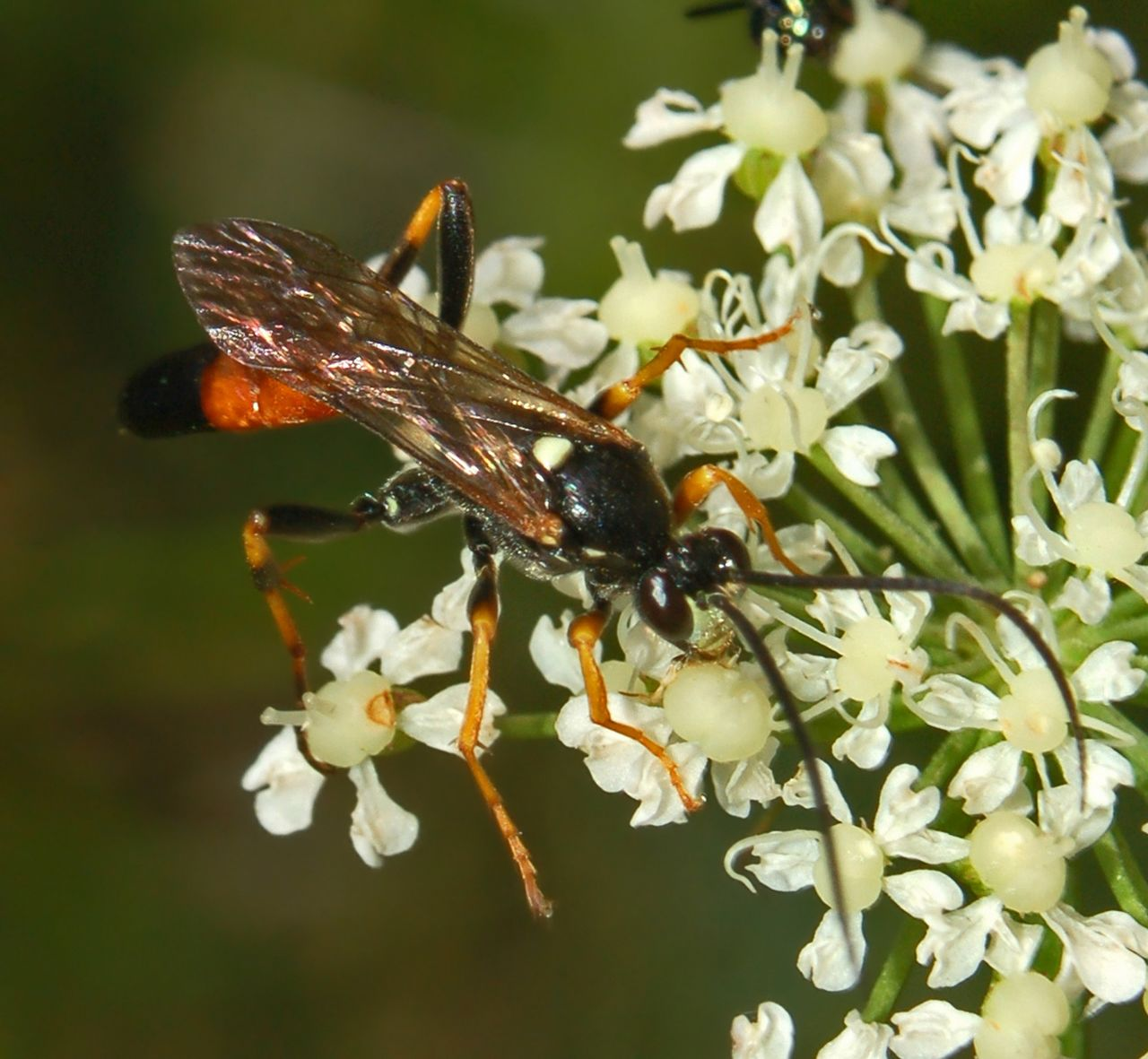
- Male

Scientific classification
- Kingdom: Animalia
- Phylum: Arthropoda
- Clade: Pancrustacea
- Class: Insecta
- Order: Hymenoptera
- Family: Ichneumonidae
- Genus: Ichneumon
- Species: I. insidiosus

Binomial name
- Ichneumon insidiosus Wesmael, 1844

Synonyms
- Ichneumon gansuanus Kokujev, 1904; Ichneumon corfitzi Thomson, 1890; Ichneumon jesperi Thomson, 189

= Ichneumon insidiosus =

Species of wasp

Ichneumon insidiosus is a species belonging to the family Ichneumonidae subfamily Ichneumoninae. It was first described by Constantin Wesmael in 1844.

== Subspecies ==
Subspecies include:

- Ichneumon insidiosus insidiosus Wesmael, 1844
- Ichneumon insidiosus malaisei Roman, 1927

== Description ==
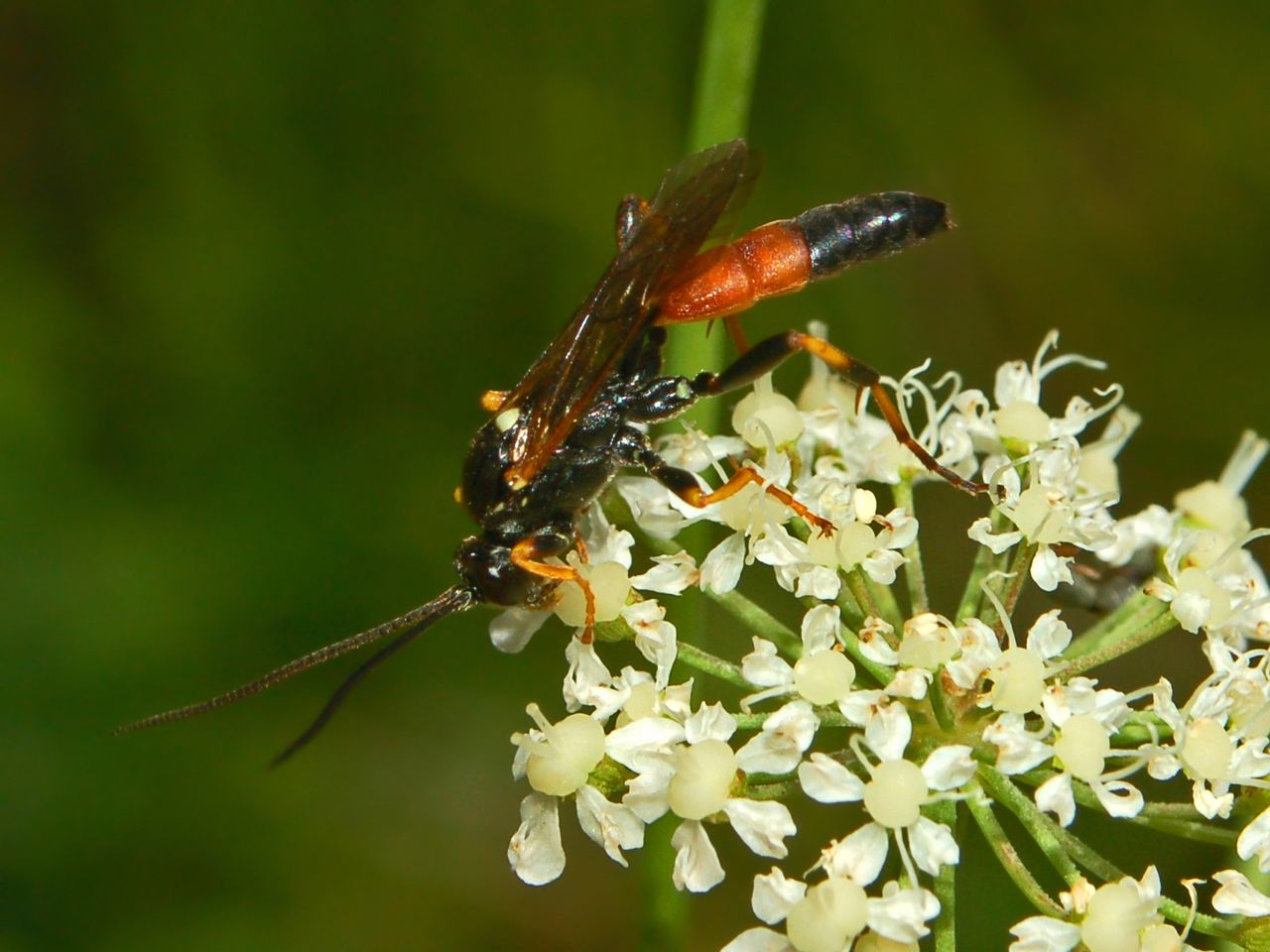
Ichneumon insidiosus feeding on Laserpitium latifolium

Ichneumon insidiosus can reach a length of about 10 millimetres (0.39 in). This parasitic wasp has a black head and thorax, most of the legs are yellowish, while the abdomen is reddish with a black tip.

== Distribution ==
This species is present in most of Europe (Andorra; Austria; Azerbaijan; Belarus; Belgium; Bulgaria; China; Croatia; Czech Republic; Slovakia; Finland; France; Germany; Hungary; Iran; Ireland; Italy; Liechtenstein; Netherlands; Poland; Portugal; Romania; Russia; Spain; Sweden; Switzerland; United Kingdom; former Yugoslavia).
