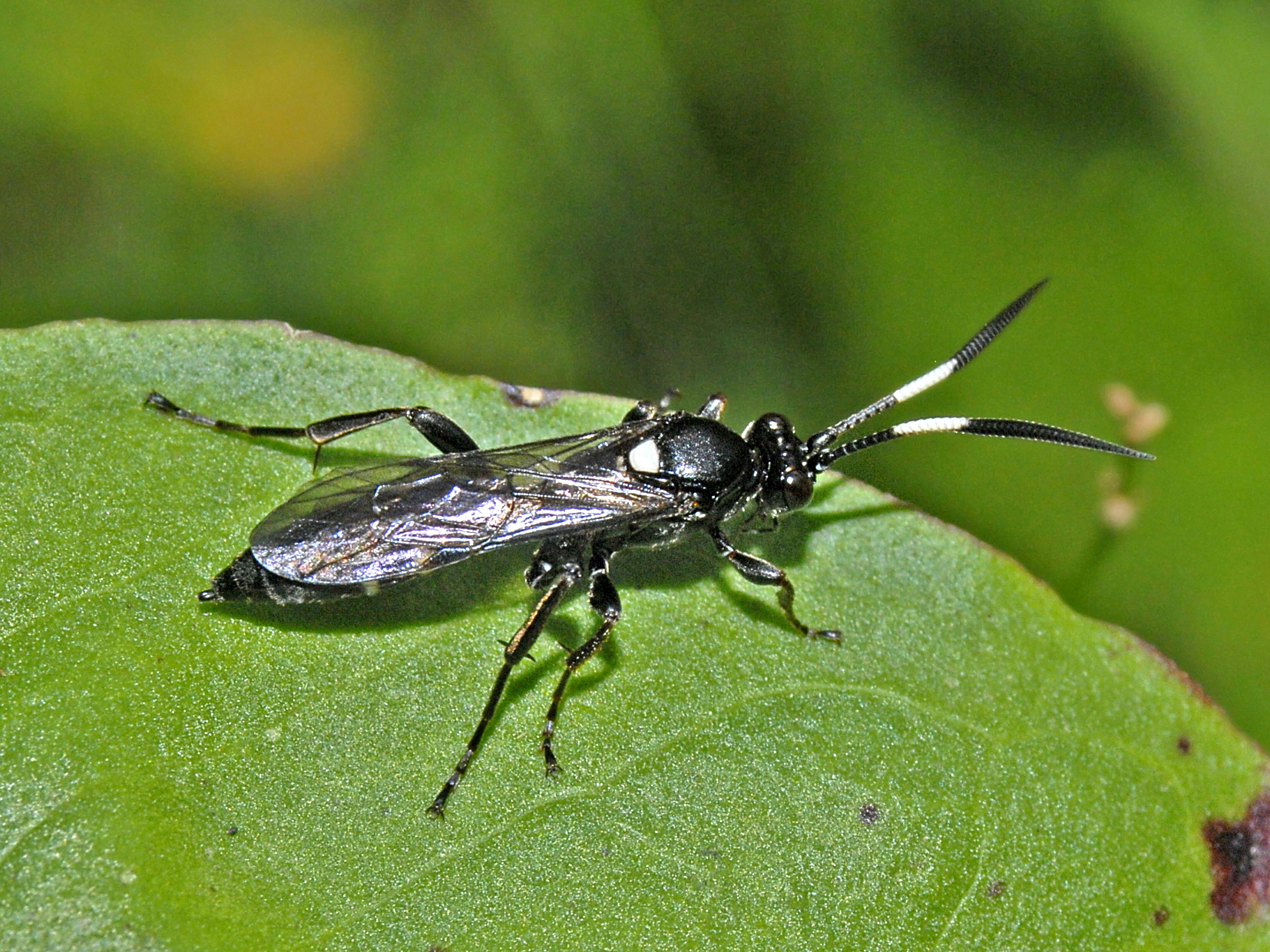

Scientific classification
- Kingdom: Animalia
- Phylum: Arthropoda
- Clade: Pancrustacea
- Class: Insecta
- Order: Hymenoptera
- Family: Ichneumonidae
- Genus: Coelichneumon
- Species: C. cyaniventris

Binomial name
- Coelichneumon cyaniventris (Wesmael, 1859)

Synonyms
- Coelichneumon biobliteratus (Pic, 1923); Coelichneumon multialbonotatus (Pic, 1923); Coelichneumon shikokuensis Uchida, 1935

= Coelichneumon cyaniventris =

Species of wasp

Coelichneumon cyaniventris is a species of wasp belonging to the family Ichneumonidae. The species was first described by Constantin Wesmael in 1859.

== Description ==
Coelichneumon cyaniventris can reach a length of 12–15 millimetres (0.47–0.59 in) in males, of 14–15 millimetres (0.55–0.59 in) in females. Adults can be found from June to September.

== Distribution ==
This species can be found in Austria, Belgium, Czechoslovakia, Finland, France, Germany, Hungary, Ireland, Italy, Japan, Korea, Latvia, Luxembourg, Netherlands, Poland, Romania, Russia, Spain, Switzerland, Ukraine and the United Kingdom.
