= Semioptila axine =

Scientific classification
- Kingdom: Animalia
- Phylum: Arthropoda
- Clade: Pancrustacea
- Class: Insecta
- Order: Lepidoptera
- Family: Himantopteridae
- Genus: Semioptila
- Species: S. axine

Binomial name
- Semioptila axine Hering, 1937

Species of moth

Semioptila axine is a moth in the Himantopteridae family. It was described by Erich Martin Hering in 1937. It is found in Katanga Province of the Democratic Republic of the Congo.
