= Staphylinochrous fulva =

Scientific classification
- Kingdom: Animalia
- Phylum: Arthropoda
- Class: Insecta
- Order: Lepidoptera
- Family: Himantopteridae
- Subfamily: Anomoeotinae
- Genus: Staphylinochrous
- Species: S. fulva

Binomial name
- Staphylinochrous fulva Hampson, 1910

Synonyms
- Staphylinochrous radiata Hering, 1937

Species of moth

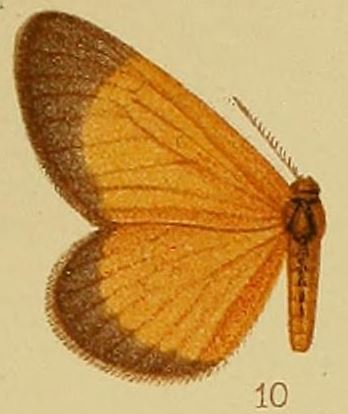
Staphylinochrous fulva

Staphylinochrous fulva is a species of long-tailed burnet moth in the family Himantopteridae, found in the Democratic Republic of the Congo.
