= Semioptila seminigra =

Scientific classification
- Domain: Eukaryota
- Kingdom: Animalia
- Phylum: Arthropoda
- Class: Insecta
- Order: Lepidoptera
- Family: Himantopteridae
- Genus: Semioptila
- Species: S. seminigra

Binomial name
- Semioptila seminigra Talbot, 1928

Species of moth

Semioptila seminigra is a moth in the Himantopteridae family. It was described by George Talbot in 1928. It is found in the Democratic Republic of the Congo.
