= Doratopteryx zopheropa =

Scientific classification
- Domain: Eukaryota
- Kingdom: Animalia
- Phylum: Arthropoda
- Class: Insecta
- Order: Lepidoptera
- Family: Himantopteridae
- Genus: Doratopteryx
- Species: D. zopheropa

Binomial name
- Doratopteryx zopheropa Bethune-Baker, 1911

Species of moth

Doratopteryx zopheropa is a moth in the Himantopteridae family. It was described by George Thomas Bethune-Baker in 1911. It is found in Uganda.

The wingspan is about 24 mm. The head and thorax are dusky grey and the abdomen is yellowish. The forewings are dusky grey, with an obscure yellowish dash in the cell and a small basal patch below the cell. The hindwings have a base yellowish and the long entirely filamentary tail is dusky.
