= Semioptila latifulva =

Scientific classification
- Kingdom: Animalia
- Phylum: Arthropoda
- Class: Insecta
- Order: Lepidoptera
- Family: Himantopteridae
- Genus: Semioptila
- Species: S. latifulva

Binomial name
- Semioptila latifulva Hampson, 1920

Species of moth

Semioptila latifulva is a moth in the Himantopteridae family. It was described by George Hampson in 1920. It is found in Tanzania.

The wingspan is about 30 mm. The head, thorax and abdomen are fulvous (tawny) orange, the antennae black brown and the pectus, legs, and ventral surface of the abdomen dark brown. The forewings are fulvous yellow to near the end of the cell and from there to the termen at vein 2, the costa, the terminal part of the median nervure, and the apical area dark brown. A round fulvous-yellow spot is found beyond the discocellulars. The hindwings are fulvous yellow to one half, then dark brown with a short yellow streak above the inner margin at two-thirds, when it expands slightly into traces of a lobe.
