= Semioptila psalidoprocne =

Scientific classification
- Kingdom: Animalia
- Phylum: Arthropoda
- Class: Insecta
- Order: Lepidoptera
- Family: Himantopteridae
- Genus: Semioptila
- Species: S. psalidoprocne

Binomial name
- Semioptila psalidoprocne Kiriakoff, 1954

Species of moth

Semioptila psalidoprocne is a moth in the Himantopteridae family. It was described by Sergius G. Kiriakoff in 1954. It is found in the Democratic Republic of the Congo.
