= Doratopteryx steniptera =

Scientific classification
- Kingdom: Animalia
- Phylum: Arthropoda
- Class: Insecta
- Order: Lepidoptera
- Family: Himantopteridae
- Genus: Doratopteryx
- Species: D. steniptera

Binomial name
- Doratopteryx steniptera Hampson, 1919

Species of moth

Doratopteryx steniptera is a moth in the Himantopteridae family. It was described by George Hampson in 1919. It is found in Tanzania.

The wingspan is about 20 mm. The forewings are semihyaline sparsely clothed with brown scales, the costa and veins dark reddish brown, the area below the cell fulvous orange to beyond the middle. The hindwings expand somewhat near base, then very narrow, with traces of a lobe at three-fourths. The basal fourth is fulvous orange, the rest of the wing dark reddish brown.
