= Semioptila ansorgei =

Scientific classification
- Domain: Eukaryota
- Kingdom: Animalia
- Phylum: Arthropoda
- Class: Insecta
- Order: Lepidoptera
- Family: Himantopteridae
- Genus: Semioptila
- Species: S. ansorgei

Binomial name
- Semioptila ansorgei Rothschild, 1907

Synonyms
- Himantopterus ansorgei Rothschild, 1907

Species of moth

Semioptila ansorgei is a moth in the Himantopteridae family. It was described by Walter Rothschild in 1907. It is endemic to Angola. It is named for William John Ansorge, the collector of the holotype.

The body, the basal area of the forewing, a spot at the apex of the cell of both wings and the basal third of the hindwing are yellow. The rest of the wings are brownish black and transparent. The hindwings are of nearly even width from the base to the apex, the abdominal margin being very slightly dilated beyond the middle in most specimens, and the tip of the tail feebly widened.
