= Himantopterus venatus =

Scientific classification
- Domain: Eukaryota
- Kingdom: Animalia
- Phylum: Arthropoda
- Class: Insecta
- Order: Lepidoptera
- Family: Himantopteridae
- Genus: Himantopterus
- Species: H. venatus

Binomial name
- Himantopterus venatus Strand, 1914

Species of moth

Himantopterus venatus is a moth in the family Himantopteridae. It was described by Strand in 1914. It is found on Java.
