= Semioptila longipennis =

Scientific classification
- Domain: Eukaryota
- Kingdom: Animalia
- Phylum: Arthropoda
- Class: Insecta
- Order: Lepidoptera
- Family: Himantopteridae
- Genus: Semioptila
- Species: S. longipennis

Binomial name
- Semioptila longipennis Hering, 1937

Species of moth

Semioptila longipennis is a moth in the Himantopteridae family. It was described by Erich Martin Hering in 1937. It is found in South Africa (Gauteng) and Tanzania.
