= Staphylinochrous euryperalis =

Scientific classification
- Kingdom: Animalia
- Phylum: Arthropoda
- Class: Insecta
- Order: Lepidoptera
- Family: Himantopteridae
- Subfamily: Anomoeotinae
- Genus: Staphylinochrous
- Species: S. euryperalis

Binomial name
- Staphylinochrous euryperalis Hampson, 1910

Synonyms
- Staphylinochrous euryperialis Hampson, 1910

Species of moth

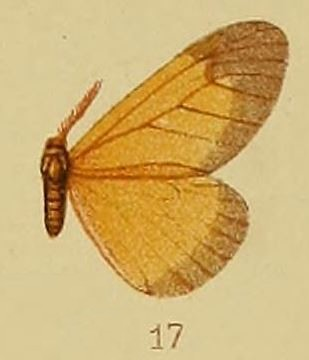
Staphylinochrous euryperalis

Staphylinochrous euryperalis is a species of moth of the family Himantopteridae. It is found in Cameroon, the Central African Republic, Uganda and Zimbabwe.
