= Semioptila ursula =

Scientific classification
- Domain: Eukaryota
- Kingdom: Animalia
- Phylum: Arthropoda
- Class: Insecta
- Order: Lepidoptera
- Family: Himantopteridae
- Genus: Semioptila
- Species: S. ursula

Binomial name
- Semioptila ursula Hering, 1937

Species of moth

Semioptila ursula is a moth in the Himantopteridae family. It was described by Erich Martin Hering in 1937. It is found in Katanga Province in the Democratic Republic of the Congo.
