= Semioptila torta =

Scientific classification
- Domain: Eukaryota
- Kingdom: Animalia
- Phylum: Arthropoda
- Class: Insecta
- Order: Lepidoptera
- Family: Himantopteridae
- Genus: Semioptila
- Species: S. torta

Binomial name
- Semioptila torta Butler, 1877

Species of moth

Semioptila torta is a moth in the Himantopteridae family. It was described by Arthur Gardiner Butler in 1877. It is found in the Democratic Republic of the Congo, Malawi, Mozambique, Zambia, Zimbabwe, and South Africa.

The wingspan is about 24 mm. The wings are transparent and sparsely scaled, the basal half with rust-reddish or reddish-orange scales, the outer or terminal half with brown scales. The hindwings have an oval orange spot beyond the cell. The body is pitchy brown, the abdomen with cupreous-brown scales. The vertex of the head and collar are orange and the undersurface is pale brown, with a few orange hairs on the pectus.

== Subspecies ==
There are two subspecies:

- Semioptila torta torta
- Semioptila torta maschuna Rothschild, 1907 (Zimbabwe)
