= Himantopterus nox =

Scientific classification
- Domain: Eukaryota
- Kingdom: Animalia
- Phylum: Arthropoda
- Class: Insecta
- Order: Lepidoptera
- Family: Himantopteridae
- Genus: Himantopterus
- Species: H. nox

Binomial name
- Himantopterus nox (Hering, 1937)

Synonyms
- Thymara nox Hering, 1937

Species of moth

Himantopterus nox is a moth in the family Himantopteridae. It was described by Hering in 1937. It is found in India (Assam).
