= Doratopteryx dissemurus =

Scientific classification
- Domain: Eukaryota
- Kingdom: Animalia
- Phylum: Arthropoda
- Class: Insecta
- Order: Lepidoptera
- Family: Himantopteridae
- Genus: Doratopteryx
- Species: D. dissemurus

Binomial name
- Doratopteryx dissemurus Kiriakoff, 1963

Species of moth

Doratopteryx dissemurus is a moth in the Himantopteridae family. It was described by Sergius G. Kiriakoff in 1963. It is found in Guinea.
