= Staphylinochrous elongata =

Scientific classification
- Kingdom: Animalia
- Phylum: Arthropoda
- Class: Insecta
- Order: Lepidoptera
- Family: Himantopteridae
- Subfamily: Anomoeotinae
- Genus: Staphylinochrous
- Species: S. elongata

Binomial name
- Staphylinochrous elongata Hering, 1937

Species of moth

Staphylinochrous elongata is a species of long-tailed burnet moth in the family Himantopteridae, found in the Democratic Republic of the Congo.
