= Staphylinochrous euriphaea =

Scientific classification
- Kingdom: Animalia
- Phylum: Arthropoda
- Class: Insecta
- Order: Lepidoptera
- Family: Himantopteridae
- Genus: Staphylinochrous
- Species: S. euriphaea

Binomial name
- Staphylinochrous euriphaea Hampson, 1920

Species of moth

Staphylinochrous euriphaea is a species of moth of the Anomoeotidae family. It is found in Cameroon and Ghana.

George Hampson's description, based on the male, has both body and wings fulvous orange, with dark brown markings around the edges of the wings.
