= Himantopterus =

Scientific classification
- Domain: Eukaryota
- Kingdom: Animalia
- Phylum: Arthropoda
- Class: Insecta
- Order: Lepidoptera
- Family: Himantopteridae
- Genus: Himantopterus; Wesmael, 1836

Genus of moths

Himantopterus is a genus of moths in the family Himantopteridae. It was described by Constantin Wesmael in 1836.

== Species ==
- Himantopterus caudata Moore, 1879
- Himantopterus dohertyi Elwes, 1890
- Himantopterus fuscinervis Wesmael, 1836
- Himantopterus nox Hering, 1937
- Himantopterus nobuyukii Y. Kishida & Inomata, 1993
- Himantopterus venatus Strand, 1914
- Himantopterus zaida Doubleday, 1843
