= Pedoptila ubangiana =

Scientific classification
- Domain: Eukaryota
- Kingdom: Animalia
- Phylum: Arthropoda
- Class: Insecta
- Order: Lepidoptera
- Family: Himantopteridae
- Genus: Pedoptila
- Species: P. ubangiana

Binomial name
- Pedoptila ubangiana Schultze, 1931

Species of moth

Pedoptila ubangiana is a moth in the Himantopteridae family. It was described by Arnold Schultze in 1931. It is found in the Central African Republic.
