= Staphylinochrous heringi =

Scientific classification
- Domain: Eukaryota
- Kingdom: Animalia
- Phylum: Arthropoda
- Class: Insecta
- Order: Lepidoptera
- Family: Himantopteridae
- Subfamily: Anomoeotinae
- Genus: Staphylinochrous
- Species: S. heringi

Binomial name
- Staphylinochrous heringi Alberti, 1954

Species of moth

Staphylinochrous heringi is a species of long-tailed burnet moth in the family Himantopteridae, found in Equatorial Guinea.
