= Pedoptila thaletes =

Scientific classification
- Kingdom: Animalia
- Phylum: Arthropoda
- Clade: Pancrustacea
- Class: Insecta
- Order: Lepidoptera
- Family: Himantopteridae
- Genus: Pedoptila
- Species: P. thaletes

Binomial name
- Pedoptila thaletes H. Druce, 1907

Species of moth

Pedoptila thaletes is a moth in the family Himantopteridae. It was described by Herbert Druce in 1907. It is found in the Republic of the Congo and Cameroon.

The head, collar, tegulae, thorax, and abdomen are reddish brown, the abdomen are banded with black and the antennae, underside of the abdomen, and the legs are black. The anus is clothed with greyish hairs. The basal half of the reddish forewings is orange, the outer half is black, and the veins are black. The hindwings are reddish orange as far as the lobe, which is black almost to the end of the wing. The tip of the tail is white.
