= Semioptila fulveolans =

Scientific classification
- Domain: Eukaryota
- Kingdom: Animalia
- Phylum: Arthropoda
- Class: Insecta
- Order: Lepidoptera
- Family: Himantopteridae
- Genus: Semioptila
- Species: S. fulveolans

Binomial name
- Semioptila fulveolans (Mabille, 1897)

Synonyms
- Himantopterus fulveolans Mabille, 1897

Species of moth

Semioptila fulveolans is a moth in the Himantopteridae family. It was described by Paul Mabille in 1897. It is found in Angola, the Democratic Republic of the Congo (West Kasai), South Africa and Tanzania.
