= Staphylinochrous albabasis =

Scientific classification
- Kingdom: Animalia
- Phylum: Arthropoda
- Class: Insecta
- Order: Lepidoptera
- Family: Himantopteridae
- Subfamily: Anomoeotinae
- Genus: Staphylinochrous
- Species: S. albabasis

Binomial name
- Staphylinochrous albabasis Bethune-Baker, 1911

Species of moth

Staphylinochrous albabasis is a species of long-tailed burnet moth in the family Himantopteridae, found in Angola.
