= Staphylinochrous angustifascia =

Scientific classification
- Kingdom: Animalia
- Phylum: Arthropoda
- Class: Insecta
- Order: Lepidoptera
- Family: Himantopteridae
- Subfamily: Anomoeotinae
- Genus: Staphylinochrous
- Species: S. angustifascia

Binomial name
- Staphylinochrous angustifascia Hering, 1937

Species of moth

Staphylinochrous angustifascia is a species of long-tailed burnet moth in the family Himantopteridae, found in the Democratic Republic of the Congo.
