= Semioptila trogoloba =

Scientific classification
- Kingdom: Animalia
- Phylum: Arthropoda
- Class: Insecta
- Order: Lepidoptera
- Family: Himantopteridae
- Genus: Semioptila
- Species: S. trogoloba

Binomial name
- Semioptila trogoloba Hampson, 1920

Species of moth

Semioptila trogoloba is a moth in the Himantopteridae family. It was described by George Hampson in 1920. It is found in Malawi and Mozambique.

The wingspan is 22–26 mm. Males have a fulvous-orange head, thorax and abdomen, black-brown antennae and brown legs. The forewings are fulvous orange to near the end of the cell, the outer edge then excurved and slightly waved to the termen above the tornus. The apical area, costa, extremity of the median nervure, vein 3 and vein 2 towards the tornus are black brown. A rounded fulvous-orange spot is found beyond the discocellulars. The hindwing expands moderately to the lobe, the outer edge of which is strongly excised below the tail. They are fulvous orange to the lobe, then black brown with a large fulvous-orange lunule before the excised part of extremity of the lobe. The metathorax of the females is dark brown and the abdomen is dorsally suffused with chocolate brown, ventrally black brown, the anal tuft dark brown and greyish. The forewings have the outer edge of the fulvous-orange area diffused and indefinite, the terminal area greyer brown in the interspaces and diffused to the origin of vein 2 in the cell and below it above vein 2.

== Subspecies ==
- Semioptila trogoloba trogoloba (Malawi)
- Semioptila trogoloba xanthophila Hering, 1937 (Mozambique)
