= Himantopterus caudata =

Scientific classification
- Domain: Eukaryota
- Kingdom: Animalia
- Phylum: Arthropoda
- Class: Insecta
- Order: Lepidoptera
- Family: Himantopteridae
- Genus: Himantopterus
- Species: H. caudata

Binomial name
- Himantopterus caudata (Moore, 1879)

Synonyms
- Thymara caudata Moore, 1879

Species of moth

Himantopterus caudata is a moth in the family Himantopteridae. It was described by Frederic Moore in 1879. It is found in Myanmar and Assam, India.

The wingspan is about 20 mm. The forewings are dark fuliginous (sooty) and the veins are black. The space within the cell and immediately below it to the base is ochreous. The hindwings are golden yellow, with a large median costal spot, a smaller subanal spot, and the entire elongated tail and its fringe are black. The body is golden yellow and the thorax and anal tuft are black. The front of the head and legs are golden yellow.
