= Himantopterus nobuyukii =

Scientific classification
- Domain: Eukaryota
- Kingdom: Animalia
- Phylum: Arthropoda
- Class: Insecta
- Order: Lepidoptera
- Family: Himantopteridae
- Genus: Himantopterus
- Species: H. nobuyukii

Binomial name
- Himantopterus nobuyukii Y. Kishida & Inomata, 1993

Species of moth

Himantopterus nobuyukii is a moth in the family Himantopteridae. It was described by Yasunori Kishida and Toshio Inomata in 1993. It is found on Borneo.
