= Himantopterus zaida =

Scientific classification
- Domain: Eukaryota
- Kingdom: Animalia
- Phylum: Arthropoda
- Class: Insecta
- Order: Lepidoptera
- Family: Himantopteridae
- Genus: Himantopterus
- Species: H. zaida

Binomial name
- Himantopterus zaida (Doubleday, 1843)

Synonyms
- Thymara zaida Doubleday, 1843; Himantopterus zaida flavescens Jordan, 1907

Species of moth

Himantopterus zaida is a moth in the family Himantopteridae. It was described by Edward Doubleday in 1843. It is found in northern India.

The forewings are diaphanous, the nervures, costae, outer margin and cilia fuscous, and the disk and inner margin orange. The hindwings are orange, with a large black spot at the anal and outer angles. The tails are black, tipped with white.
