= Semioptila papilionaria =

Scientific classification
- Kingdom: Animalia
- Phylum: Arthropoda
- Class: Insecta
- Order: Lepidoptera
- Family: Himantopteridae
- Genus: Semioptila
- Species: S. papilionaria

Binomial name
- Semioptila papilionaria (Walker, 1864)

Synonyms
- Thymara papilionaria Walker, 1864

Species of moth

Semioptila papilionaria is a moth in the Himantopteridae family. It was described by Francis Walker in 1864. It is found in Africa.
