= Pedoptila nemopteridia =

Scientific classification
- Domain: Eukaryota
- Kingdom: Animalia
- Phylum: Arthropoda
- Class: Insecta
- Order: Lepidoptera
- Family: Himantopteridae
- Genus: Pedoptila
- Species: P. nemopteridia

Binomial name
- Pedoptila nemopteridia Butler, 1885

Species of moth

Pedoptila nemopteridia is a moth in the Himantopteridae family. It was described by Arthur Gardiner Butler in 1885. It is found in the Democratic Republic of the Congo, Ghana, Sierra Leone and South Africa.

The wingspan is about 23 mm. The wings are semitransparent. The basal two-fifths of the forewings and the basal third of the hindwings is bright russet reddish, the remainder of the wings are grey. The veins are darker than the ground colour. The body is sienna reddish and the antennae are dark brown.
