= Doratopteryx camerunica =

Scientific classification
- Kingdom: Animalia
- Phylum: Arthropoda
- Class: Insecta
- Order: Lepidoptera
- Family: Himantopteridae
- Genus: Doratopteryx
- Species: D. camerunica

Binomial name
- Doratopteryx camerunica Hering, 1937

Species of moth

Doratopteryx camerunica is a moth in the Himantopteridae family. It was described by Hering in 1937. It is found in Cameroon.
