= Doratopteryx xanthomelas =

Scientific classification
- Domain: Eukaryota
- Kingdom: Animalia
- Phylum: Arthropoda
- Class: Insecta
- Order: Lepidoptera
- Family: Himantopteridae
- Genus: Doratopteryx
- Species: D. xanthomelas

Binomial name
- Doratopteryx xanthomelas Rothschild & Jordan, 1903

Species of moth

Doratopteryx xanthomelas is a moth in the Himantopteridae family. It was described by Walter Rothschild and Karl Jordan in 1903. It is found in Angola.

The body and wings are ochreous orange, the forewing from apical third of cell to the apex and hindwing from the apical fourth of the wider proximal part of wing to the tip of the tail black. The antennae are brown. The forewings have a very small orange dot at the apex of the cell and there are four subcostal spots, the first close before the apex of the cell, the other three stalked together, the last standing near the cell.
