= Semioptila monochroma =

Scientific classification
- Kingdom: Animalia
- Phylum: Arthropoda
- Class: Insecta
- Order: Lepidoptera
- Family: Himantopteridae
- Genus: Semioptila
- Species: S. monochroma

Binomial name
- Semioptila monochroma Hering, 1932

Species of moth

Semioptila monochroma is a moth in the Himantopteridae family. It was described by Erich Martin Hering in 1932. It is found in Katanga Province in the Democratic Republic of the Congo.
