= Ichneumon rubriornatus =

Scientific classification
- Domain: Eukaryota
- Kingdom: Animalia
- Phylum: Arthropoda
- Class: Insecta
- Order: Hymenoptera
- Family: Ichneumonidae
- Genus: Ichneumon
- Species: I. rubriornatus

Binomial name
- Ichneumon rubriornatus Cameron, 1904

Species of wasp

Ichneumon rubriornatus is a species of wasp in the genus Ichneumon. It was described by Peter Cameron in 1904.

The species is concentrated in the southernmost part of the African continent, being observed primarily in Southern Africa.
