= Pedoptila catori =

Scientific classification
- Domain: Eukaryota
- Kingdom: Animalia
- Phylum: Arthropoda
- Class: Insecta
- Order: Lepidoptera
- Family: Himantopteridae
- Genus: Pedoptila
- Species: P. catori

Binomial name
- Pedoptila catori Bethune-Baker, 1911

Species of moth

Pedoptila catori is a moth in the Himantopteridae family. It was described by George Thomas Bethune-Baker in 1911. It is found in the Democratic Republic of the Congo (Katanga), Nigeria and Uganda.

The wingspan is about 22 mm. The head, thorax and abdomen are blackish, covered with fine deep orange hairs. The forewings have the basal half of the wings up to the end of the cell yellow, the outer portion is entirely dark sooty grey. The hindwings are yellowish for the basal third, the rest being dark sooty grey. The tail is very narrow for two-thirds, then suddenly expands and is spatulate, but equally suddenly narrows into a short, fine, slightly hooked tip.
