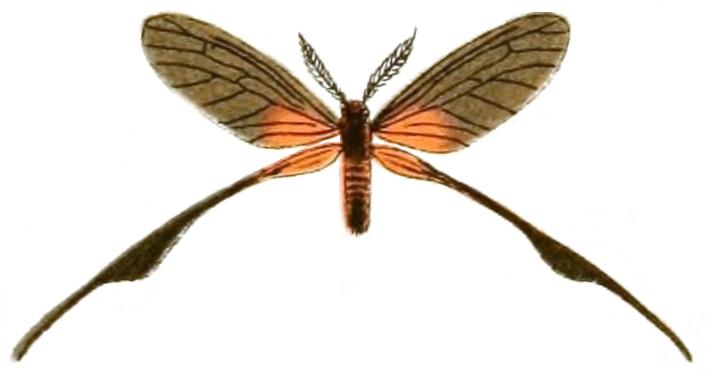

Scientific classification
- Kingdom: Animalia
- Phylum: Arthropoda
- Clade: Pancrustacea
- Class: Insecta
- Order: Lepidoptera
- Family: Himantopteridae
- Genus: Pseudothymara; Rebel, 1906
- Species: P. staudingeri

Binomial name
- Pseudothymara staudingeri (Rogenhofer, 1888)

Synonyms
- Pedoptila staudingeri Rogenhofer, 1888

= Pseudothymara =

Genus of moths

Pseudothymara staudingeri is a moth in the Himantopteridae family. It was described by Alois Friedrich Rogenhofer in 1888. It is the only species in the genus Pseudothymara. It is found in Sierra Leone.
