= Ichneumon tottor =

Scientific classification
- Kingdom: Animalia
- Phylum: Arthropoda
- Clade: Pancrustacea
- Class: Insecta
- Order: Hymenoptera
- Family: Ichneumonidae
- Genus: Ichneumon
- Species: I. tottor

Binomial name
- Ichneumon tottor Thunberg, 1822

Species of wasp

Ichneumon tottor is a species of wasp in the genus Ichneumon. It is endemic to South Africa.
