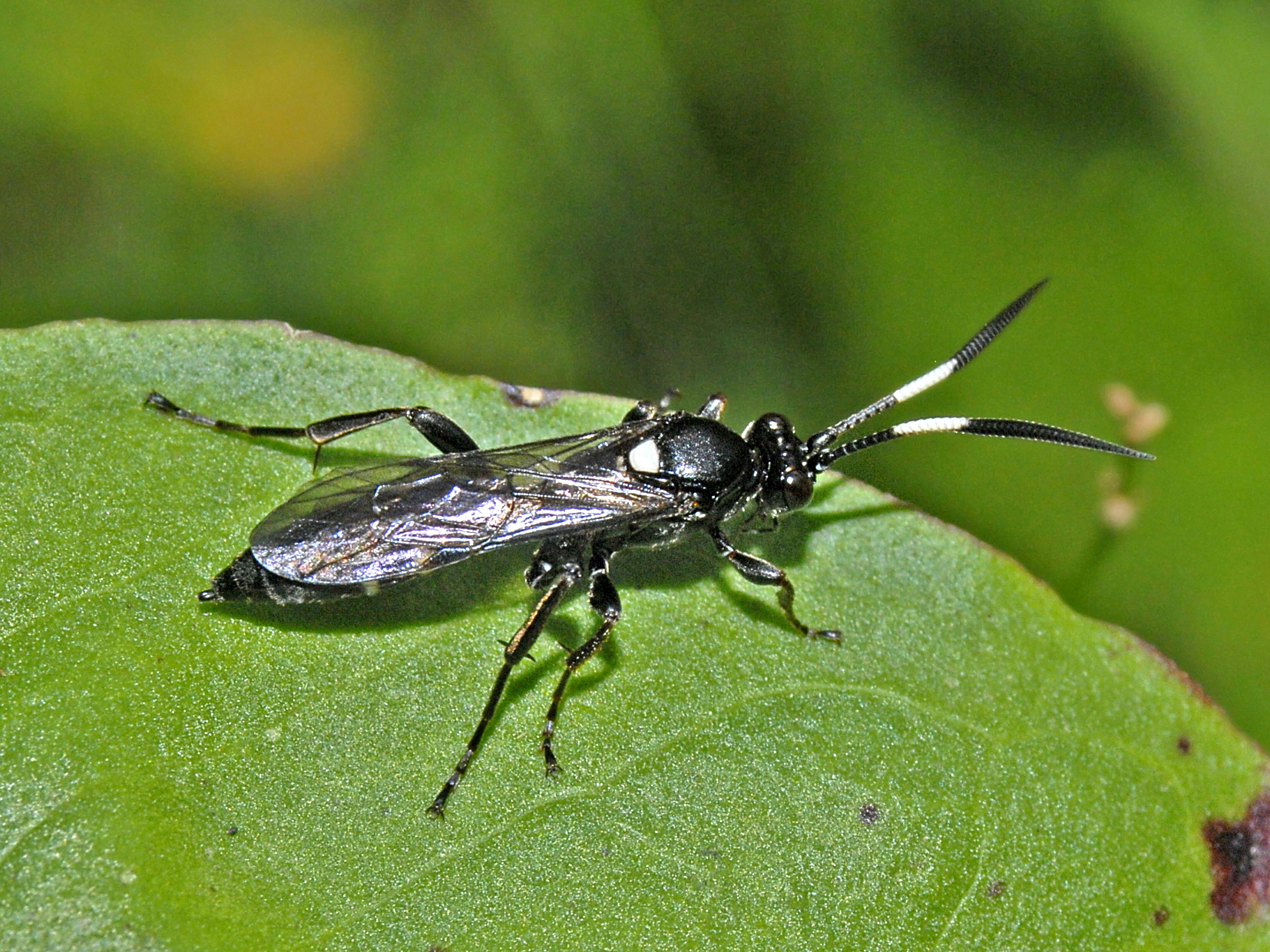
- Coelichneumon cyaniventris

Scientific classification
- Kingdom: Animalia
- Phylum: Arthropoda
- Clade: Pancrustacea
- Class: Insecta
- Order: Hymenoptera
- Family: Ichneumonidae
- Subfamily: Ichneumoninae
- Genus: Coelichneumon; Thomson, 1893

= Coelichneumon =

Genus of wasps

Coelichneumon is a genus of wasps belonging to the family Ichneumonidae.

== Genera ==
- Coelichneumon abnormis
- Coelichneumon afghanicus
- Coelichneumon aglaotypus
- Coelichneumon alaicus
- Coelichneumon albicillus
- Coelichneumon albicoxa
- Coelichneumon albitrochantellus
- Coelichneumon albonotatus
- Coelichneumon albopilosellus
- Coelichneumon alvarado
- Coelichneumon annulipes
- Coelichneumon anospilus
- Coelichneumon anthrax
- Coelichneumon assimilis
- Coelichneumon ater
- Coelichneumon atratorius
- Coelichneumon atrox
- Coelichneumon azotus
- Coelichneumon bacillus
- Coelichneumon barnstoni
- Coelichneumon beatus
- Coelichneumon bellatulus
- Coelichneumon biannulatus
- Coelichneumon biguttulatus
- Coelichneumon bilineatus
- Coelichneumon bimaculatus
- Coelichneumon birmanicus
- Coelichneumon bivittatus
- Coelichneumon bodmanorum
- Coelichneumon bohemani
- Coelichneumon bonthainensis
- Coelichneumon brunneri
- Coelichneumon cabrerai
- Coelichneumon caerulescens
- Coelichneumon caesareus
- Coelichneumon caroni
- Coelichneumon castaniventris
- Coelichneumon celebensis
- Coelichneumon chalybeus
- Coelichneumon chinicus
- Coelichneumon citimus
- Coelichneumon clypeatus
- Coelichneumon coactus
- Coelichneumon columbianus
- Coelichneumon comitator
- Coelichneumon consimilis
- Coelichneumon coreanus
- Coelichneumon coxalis
- Coelichneumon crassicornis
- Coelichneumon cretatus
- Coelichneumon cyaniventris
- Coelichneumon cyaniventrops
- Coelichneumon decemguttatus
- Coelichneumon decrescens
- Coelichneumon deliratorius
- Coelichneumon delirops
- Coelichneumon desinatorius
- Coelichneumon desultorius
- Coelichneumon dolichopsis
- Coelichneumon dorsosignatus
- Coelichneumon dubius
- Coelichneumon eburnifrons
- Coelichneumon erebeus
- Coelichneumon erythromerus
- Coelichneumon eversmanni
- Coelichneumon exephanopsis
- Coelichneumon eximiops
- Coelichneumon eximius
- Coelichneumon falsificus
- Coelichneumon femoralis
- Coelichneumon flagellator
- Coelichneumon flavitarsis
- Coelichneumon flavoguttatus
- Coelichneumon flavolineatus
- Coelichneumon flebilis
- Coelichneumon formicariator
- Coelichneumon formosulus
- Coelichneumon foxleei
- Coelichneumon fulvibasalis
- Coelichneumon fulvipes
- Coelichneumon funebrator
- Coelichneumon futasujii
- Coelichneumon gargawensis
- Coelichneumon geminus
- Coelichneumon godwinausteni
- Coelichneumon graecus
- Coelichneumon haemorrhoidalis
- Coelichneumon heptapotamicus
- Coelichneumon histricus
- Coelichneumon hopponis
- Coelichneumon hormaleoscelus
- Coelichneumon imperiosus
- Coelichneumon impressor
- Coelichneumon inutilis
- Coelichneumon iridipennis
- Coelichneumon jejunus
- Coelichneumon junceus
- Coelichneumon klapperichi
- Coelichneumon kosempensis
- Coelichneumon lacrymator
- Coelichneumon latimodjongis
- Coelichneumon leucocerus
- Coelichneumon leucographus
- Coelichneumon lineaticeps
- Coelichneumon lineiscutis
- Coelichneumon lisae
- Coelichneumon litoralis
- Coelichneumon lividusus
- Coelichneumon maculiscutis
- Coelichneumon madritinus
- Coelichneumon magniceps
- Coelichneumon magniscopa
- Coelichneumon mandibularis
- Coelichneumon maritimensis
- Coelichneumon masoni
- Coelichneumon maurus
- Coelichneumon mayri
- Coelichneumon mengkokae
- Coelichneumon merula
- Coelichneumon metidjensis
- Coelichneumon microstictus
- Coelichneumon moestus
- Coelichneumon mohrii
- Coelichneumon mongolicus
- Coelichneumon motivus
- Coelichneumon multimaculatus
- Coelichneumon navus
- Coelichneumon neocitimus
- Coelichneumon neocretatus
- Coelichneumon neomexicanus
- Coelichneumon neotypus
- Coelichneumon nigerrimus
- Coelichneumon nigratoricolor
- Coelichneumon nigratus
- Coelichneumon nigroindicum
- Coelichneumon nigrosignatus
- Coelichneumon nipponicus
- Coelichneumon nivosus
- Coelichneumon nobilis
- Coelichneumon nothus
- Coelichneumon nudicoxator
- Coelichneumon nudus
- Coelichneumon obscuratus
- Coelichneumon ocellus
- Coelichneumon octoguttatus
- Coelichneumon oltenensis
- Coelichneumon ophiusae
- Coelichneumon opulentus
- Coelichneumon orbitator
- Coelichneumon orpheus
- Coelichneumon penetrans
- Coelichneumon penicillatus
- Coelichneumon pepticus
- Coelichneumon percussor
- Coelichneumon pervagus
- Coelichneumon phaenomenon
- Coelichneumon piceipennis
- Coelichneumon pieli
- Coelichneumon pomilioaeneus
- Coelichneumon popae
- Coelichneumon probator
- Coelichneumon prolixus
- Coelichneumon pseudowalleyi
- Coelichneumon pulcher
- Coelichneumon pulcherior
- Coelichneumon pumilionobilis
- Coelichneumon punctifer
- Coelichneumon quadraticeps
- Coelichneumon quadriannulatus
- Coelichneumon quinquemaculatus
- Coelichneumon rasnitsyni
- Coelichneumon rubricoxa
- Coelichneumon rubroaeneus
- Coelichneumon rudis
- Coelichneumon rufibasalis
- Coelichneumon ruficauda
- Coelichneumon rufiventris
- Coelichneumon rufofemoratus
- Coelichneumon sassacoides
- Coelichneumon sassacus
- Coelichneumon scutellaris
- Coelichneumon semilaevis
- Coelichneumon septenus
- Coelichneumon serenus
- Coelichneumon sillemi
- Coelichneumon similior
- Coelichneumon singularis
- Coelichneumon sinister
- Coelichneumon strigosus
- Coelichneumon strombus
- Coelichneumon subviolaceiventris
- Coelichneumon sugiharai
- Coelichneumon sugillatorius
- Coelichneumon taihorinus
- Coelichneumon tenuitarsis
- Coelichneumon terebratus
- Coelichneumon terebrifer
- Coelichneumon torsor
- Coelichneumon tournieri
- Coelichneumon tricoloripes
- Coelichneumon validus
- Coelichneumon walleyi
- Coelichneumon vehementer
- Coelichneumon victorianus
- Coelichneumon viola
- Coelichneumon viridissimus
- Coelichneumon vitalis
- Coelichneumon yezoensis
