= Doratopteryx =

Scientific classification
- Kingdom: Animalia
- Phylum: Arthropoda
- Class: Insecta
- Order: Lepidoptera
- Family: Himantopteridae
- Genus: Doratopteryx; Rogenhöfer, 1884

Genus of moths

Doratopteryx is a genus of moths in the Himantopteridae family.

== Species ==
- Doratopteryx afra Rogenhofer, 1884
- Doratopteryx camerunica Hering, 1937
- Doratopteryx collarti Hering, 1937
- Doratopteryx dissemurus Kiriakoff, 1963
- Doratopteryx filipennis Hering, 1937
- Doratopteryx flavomaculata Hering, 1937
- Doratopteryx fulva Hering, 1937
- Doratopteryx laticauda Hering, 1937
- Doratopteryx latipennis Hering, 1937
- Doratopteryx plumigera Butler, 1888
- Doratopteryx steniptera Hampson, 1919
- Doratopteryx xanthomelas Rothschild & Jordan, 1903
- Doratopteryx zopheropa Bethune-Baker, 1911
