= Ichneumon unicinctus =

Scientific classification
- Domain: Eukaryota
- Kingdom: Animalia
- Phylum: Arthropoda
- Class: Insecta
- Order: Hymenoptera
- Family: Ichneumonidae
- Genus: Ichneumon
- Species: I. unicinctus

Binomial name
- Ichneumon unicinctus Brullé, 1846

Species of wasp

Ichneumon unicinctus is a species of wasp in the genus Ichneumon. It is endemic to Madagascar, Mauritius and Réunion.
