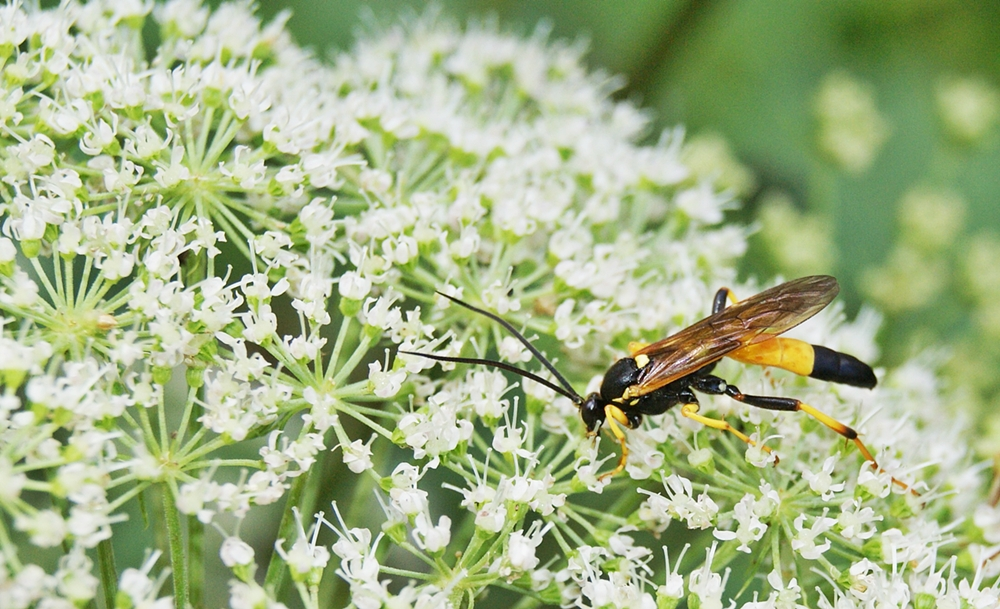
- Ichneumon extensorius

Scientific classification
- Kingdom: Animalia
- Phylum: Arthropoda
- Class: Insecta
- Order: Hymenoptera
- Family: Ichneumonidae
- Genus: Ichneumon
- Species: I. extensorius

Binomial name
- Ichneumon extensorius Linnaeus, 1758

= Ichneumon extensorius =

Species of wasp

Ichneumon extensorius is a species of parasitic wasp in the genus Ichneumon. It was described by Carl Linnaeus in 1758.
