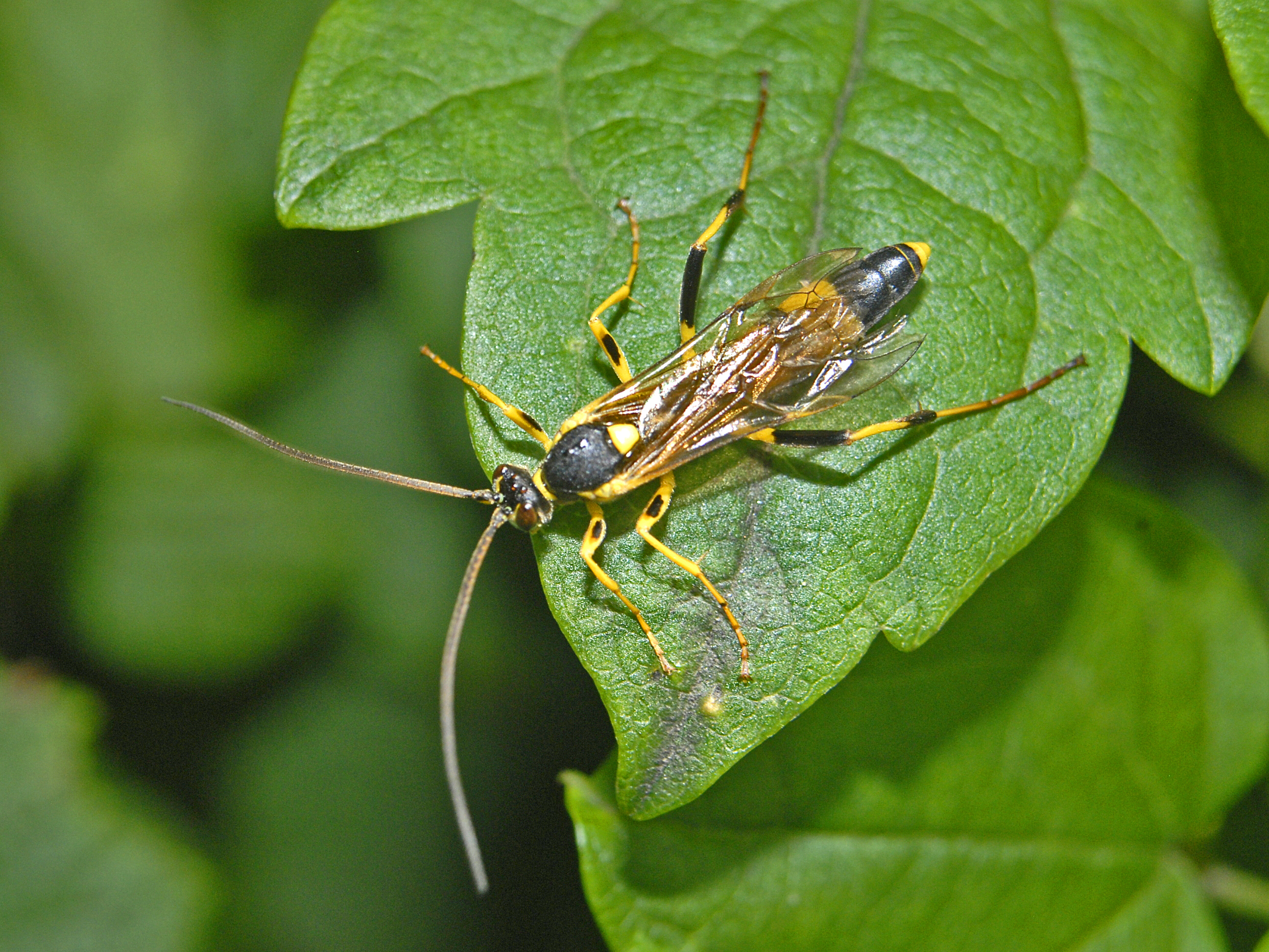
- Dorsal view
- Lateral view

Scientific classification
- Kingdom: Animalia
- Phylum: Arthropoda
- Clade: Pancrustacea
- Class: Insecta
- Order: Hymenoptera
- Family: Ichneumonidae
- Genus: Amblyteles
- Species: A. armatorius

Binomial name
- Amblyteles armatorius (Förster, 1771)

Synonyms
- Amblyteles regius Tischbein, 1868; Amblyteles diversorius (Stephens, 1835); Amblyteles signatorius (Olivier, 1792); Amblyteles dimicatorius (Gmelin, 1790); Amblyteles notatorius (Villers, 1789); Amblyteles bidentorius (Fabricius, 1775); Amblyteles fasciatorius (Fabricius, 1775)

= Amblyteles armatorius =

Species of wasp

Amblyteles armatorius is a species of parasitic wasp in the family Ichneumonidae first described by Johann Reinhold Forster in 1771.

== Description ==
Amblyteles armatorius can reach a length of 12–16 mm, excluding antennae, which reach about 9 millimetres (0.35 in). The head and thorax of this large wasp are black, except the yellow scutellum. The abdomen is yellow and more oval in the females, with broad black bands. Legs are yellow, except the hind legs, that are black and yellow. This species lacks a sting, so the characteristic markings of many aculeate wasps represent a protective mimicry. The female has a very short ovipositor that doesn't protrude from the abdomen.

Adults can be usually found in summer on flowers, especially Apiaceae species, feeding on nectar and pollen. The adults overwinter. The females of this parasitic wasp lay their eggs into the caterpillars of moths. When they hatch larvae feed on their hosts, mainly Noctuidae and Notodontidae, but also some Geometridae, Erebidae, Saturniidae and Lasiocampidae (Calliteara pudibunda, Odontopera bidentata, Macrothylacia rubi and Saturnia pavonia).

== Distribution and habitat ==
This species is a Palearctic species that is present in most of Europe, in the Near East, and in the Oriental realm. These wasps usually occur in hedgerows, meadows and spruce forest edges.
