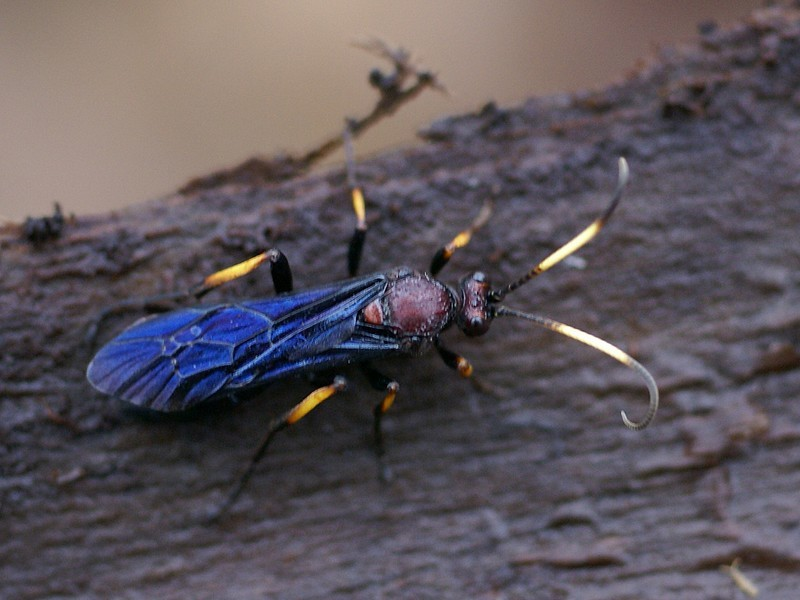
- female
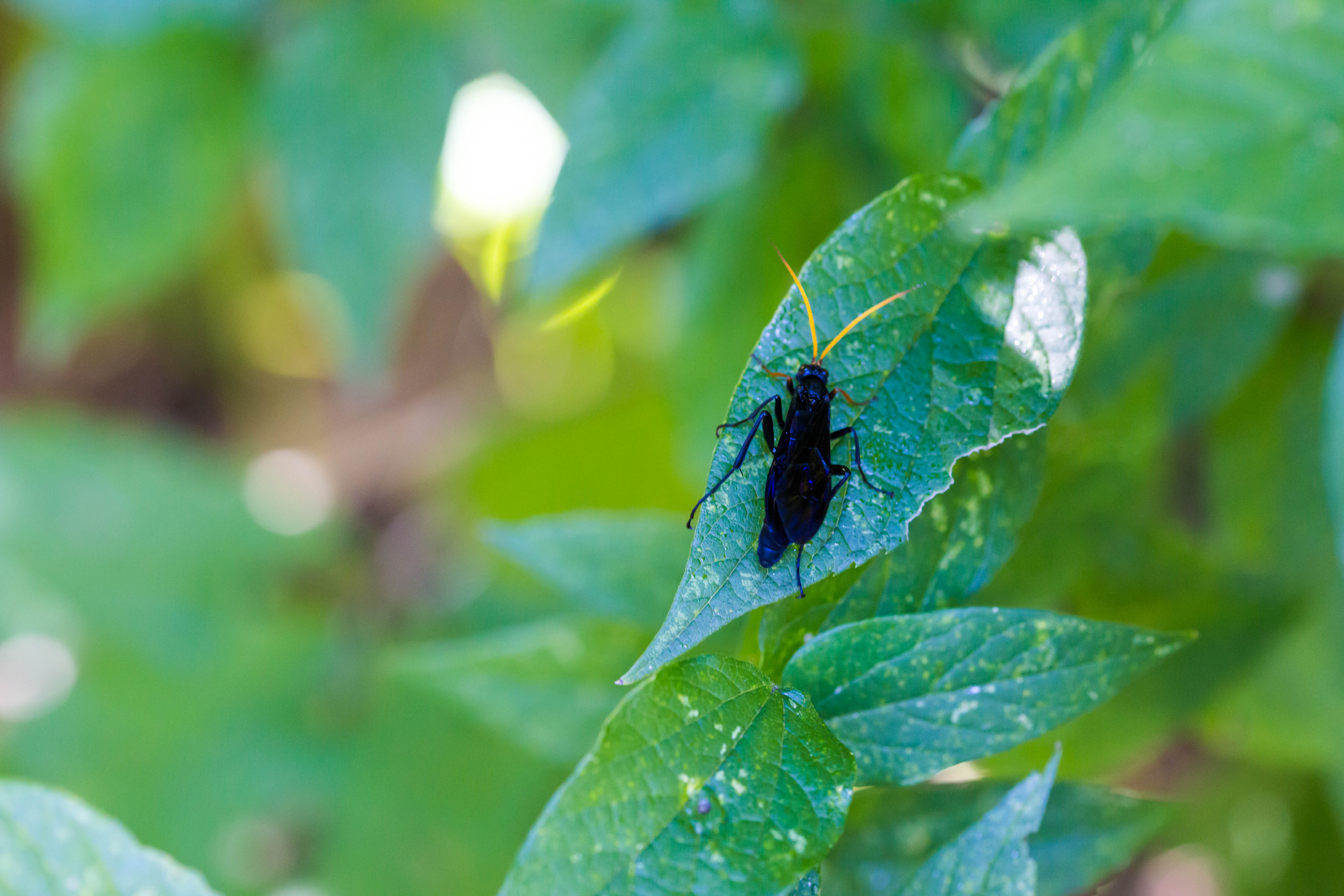
- male

Scientific classification
- Kingdom: Animalia
- Phylum: Arthropoda
- Clade: Pancrustacea
- Class: Insecta
- Order: Hymenoptera
- Suborder: Apocrita
- Superfamily: Ichneumonoidea
- Family: Ichneumonidae
- Subfamily: Ichneumoninae
- Genus: Ichneumon
- Species: I. centrator

Binomial name
- Ichneumon centrator Say, 1825

Synonyms
- Ichneumon flavicornis Cresson, 1864; Ichneumon fortis Provancher, 1875

= Ichneumon centrator =

Species of parasitoid wasp

Ichneumon centrator, the centrator wasp, is a species of endoparasitic parasitoid wasp belonging to the family Ichneumonidae in the subfamily Ichneumoninae. It was first described by Thomas Say in 1825 and is native to North America.

== Description ==
Ichneumon centrator is around 0.75 in (19 mm) long, with four wings that are described as violet or blue. The male and female wasps appear different.

The female is more colorful. It has a black body with a rust-colored head and thorax. The antennae are mostly black, being white or pale yellow between the seventh and seventeenth joints. The legs are black except the tibiae which are dark yellow. The male centrator has an all-black body with pale yellow antennae, therefore looking strikingly similar to Gnamptopelta obsidianator, a much larger wasp from the same family.

== Lifecycle ==
Being parasitoid wasps, the centrator wasp must lay its eggs inside a host for the larvae to feed and grow. The female centrator wasp deposits her eggs using her ovipositor into the larvae of Pyrrharctia isabella, which is known as the Isabella tiger moth or woolly bear caterpillar. The woolly bear caterpillar is the only host of Ichneumon centrator.

Larvae of Ichneumon centrator grow inside the living caterpillar and eventually emerge as adults from the host caterpillar pupae.

The female Ichneumon centrator overwinters as an adult, while all males die in the fall. It carefully select its hibernation site – often under snug bark on fallen trees, preferring humid areas with stable temperatures. Scientists believe pheromones from other females may guide them to good spots, leading to clusters of hibernating individuals.

When a female enters hibernation it is already fertile, having stored sperm in a spermatheca. In spring the female fertilizes its eggs and searches for the late-stage Isabella tiger moth larvae, which wake from hibernation around the same time as the wasps.

== Distribution ==
Ichneumon centrator has been found throughout North America, with the majority of sightings being concentrated in the northeastern United States and southeastern Canada. The centrator wasp has also been found in places such as British Columbia, Alberta, Washington, and Oregon, as well as in Texas.

I. centrator is most commonly found during March to August.
