= Semioptila hilaris =

Scientific classification
- Domain: Eukaryota
- Kingdom: Animalia
- Phylum: Arthropoda
- Class: Insecta
- Order: Lepidoptera
- Family: Himantopteridae
- Genus: Semioptila
- Species: S. hilaris

Binomial name
- Semioptila hilaris Rebel, 1906

Species of moth

Semioptila hilaris is a moth in the Himantopteridae family. It was described by Hans Rebel in 1906. It is found in Tanzania.
