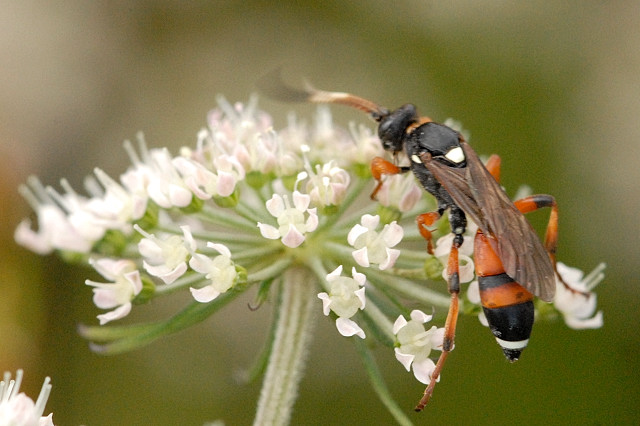

Scientific classification
- Kingdom: Animalia
- Phylum: Arthropoda
- Clade: Pancrustacea
- Class: Insecta
- Order: Hymenoptera
- Family: Ichneumonidae
- Genus: Ichneumon
- Species: I. sarcitorius

Binomial name
- Ichneumon sarcitorius Linnaeus, 1758

= Ichneumon sarcitorius =

Species of wasp

Ichneumon sarcitorius is a species of wasp belonging to the family Ichneumonidae subfamily Ichneumoninae.

== Subspecies ==
Subspecies within this species include:

- Ichneumon sarcitorius albosignatus Torka, 1930
- Ichneumon sarcitorius caucasicus Meyer, 1926
- Ichneumon sarcitorius chosensis Uchida, 1927
- Ichneumon sarcitorius corsus Kriechbaumer, 1888
- Ichneumon sarcitorius repetitor Kriechbaumer, 1882
- Ichneumon sarcitorius turkestanicus (Heinrich, 1929)

== Description ==
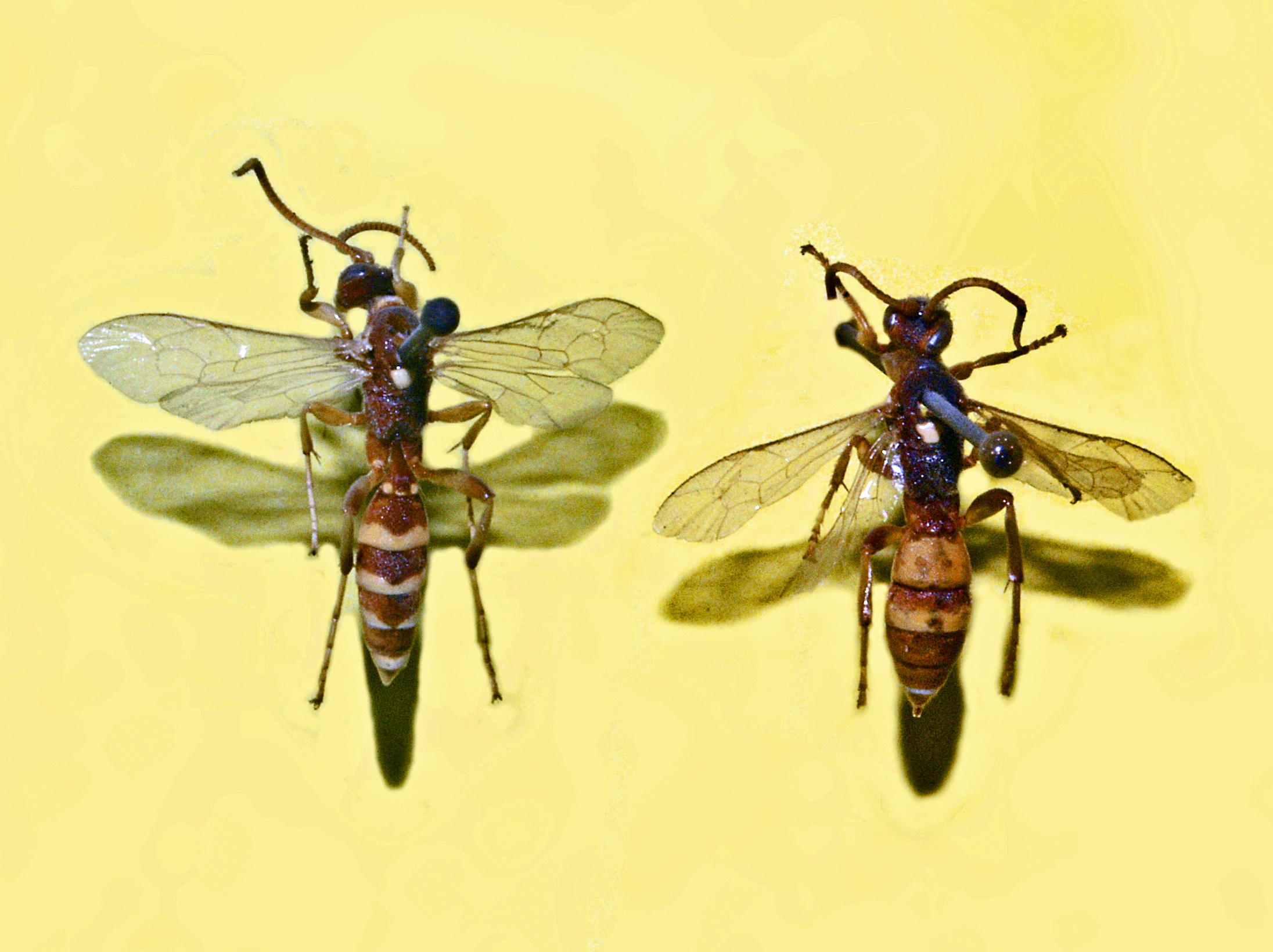
Ichneumon sarcitorius, male and female. Museum specimen

Ichneumon sarcitorius can reach a length of 10–15 millimetres (0.39–0.59 in) in the males, of 10–13 millimetres (0.39–0.51 in) in the females. These wasps show an evident sexual dimorphism. The males have a wasp like appearance with a black and yellow banded abdomen, while the females have a black abdomen with two orange bands and a white tip.

== Biology ==
Adults can be found from July to October. Larvae feed on caterpillars of Erebidae (Lymantria dispar), Noctuidae (Agrotis segetum), Arctiidae (Spilosoma lubricipeda) and Notodontidae, while adults mainly feed on nectar of umbellifers (Heracleum sphondylium).

== Distribution ==
This species is present in most of Europe, in the Near East, in the Oriental realm, and in North Africa.

== Bibliography ==
- Constantineanu, M.I.; Suciu, I.; Andriescu, I.; Ciochia, V.; Pisica, C. (1957) [Contributions a la connaissance des Ichneumonides en R.P.Roumaine. Sousfamille Ichneumoninae Forster arondissement de Husi region de Iassy.] (in Romanian with Russian & French summaries)., Analele Stiintifice ale Universitatii "Al. I. Cuza" din Iasi. Sect. II a. 3:234-263.
- Berthoumieu, V. (1895) Ichneumonides d'Europe et des pays limitrophes., Annales de la Societe Entomologique de France. 63(1894):593-664.
- Zetterstedt, J.W. (1838) Insecta Lapponica. Sectio secunda. Hymenoptera., Lipsiae. 358-408.
- Gmelin, J.F. (1790) Caroli a Linne Systema Naturae (Ed. XIII). Tom I., G.E. Beer. Lipsiae. 2225-3020. (Ichneumon: 2674-2722).
- Fourcroy, A.F. (1785) Entomologia Parisiensis, sive catalogus insectorum quae in agro Parisiensi reperiuntur., Paris. 544 pp.
- Muller, O.F. (1776) Zoologiae Danicae prodromus, seu animalium Daniae et Norvegiae indigenarum characteres, nomina et synomyma imprimis popularium., Hafniae. 282 pp. (Ichneumon on pp. 151–160)
- Linnaeus, C. von (1758) Systema naturae per regna tria naturae, secundum classes, ordines, genera, species cum characteribus, differentiis, synonymis locis. Tomus I. Editio decima, reformata., Laurnetii Salvii, Holmiae. 824 pp. (A photographic facsimile by British Museum (Natural History), London. 1956.)
