= Pedoptila =

Scientific classification
- Domain: Eukaryota
- Kingdom: Animalia
- Phylum: Arthropoda
- Class: Insecta
- Order: Lepidoptera
- Family: Himantopteridae
- Genus: Pedoptila; Butler, 1885

Synonyms
- Petoptila Bethune-Baker, 1911

Genus of moths

Pedoptila is a genus of moths in the family Himantopteridae.

== Species ==
- Pedoptila catori Bethune-Baker, 1911
- Pedoptila nemopteridia Butler, 1885
- Pedoptila nigrocristata Joicey & Talbot, 1921
- Pedoptila thaletes Druce, 1907
- Pedoptila ubangiana Schultze, 1931
