= Ichneumon nyassae =

Scientific classification
- Domain: Eukaryota
- Kingdom: Animalia
- Phylum: Arthropoda
- Class: Insecta
- Order: Hymenoptera
- Family: Ichneumonidae
- Genus: Ichneumon
- Species: I. nyassae

Binomial name
- Ichneumon nyassae Heinrich, 1967

Species of wasp

Ichneumon nyassae is a species of wasp in the genus Ichneumon. It is endemic to Tanzania.
