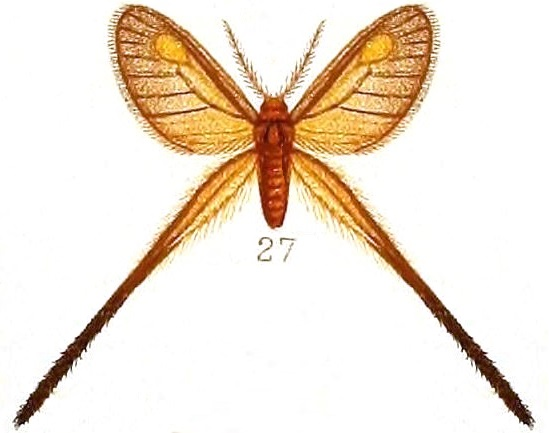

Scientific classification
- Kingdom: Animalia
- Phylum: Arthropoda
- Clade: Pancrustacea
- Class: Insecta
- Order: Lepidoptera
- Family: Himantopteridae
- Genus: Semioptila
- Species: S. flavidiscata

Binomial name
- Semioptila flavidiscata Hampson, 1910

= Semioptila flavidiscata =

Species of moth

Semioptila flavidiscata is a moth in the Himantopteridae family. It was described by George Hampson in 1910. It is found in South Africa, Zambia and Zimbabwe.

The wingspan is about 24 mm. The head and thorax of the males are black-brown, the tegulae and fringe of the hair on the upper edge of the patagia fulvous (tawny) orange. The abdomen is dorsally red brown, yellow at the sides and black brown below. The forewings are dark brown, thinly scaled, the veins darker. The cell is fulvous yellow, conjoined to a round spot beyond it and the inner area is fulvous yellow to the cell and vein 2. The hindwings are linear lanceolate, expanding somewhat towards the base but not towards the extremity. The basal third is fulvous yellow, the terminal two-thirds black brown. The forewings of the females have the cell and inner area paler fulvous yellow and the hindwing expand still less towards the base, the basal third is pale fulvous yellow.
