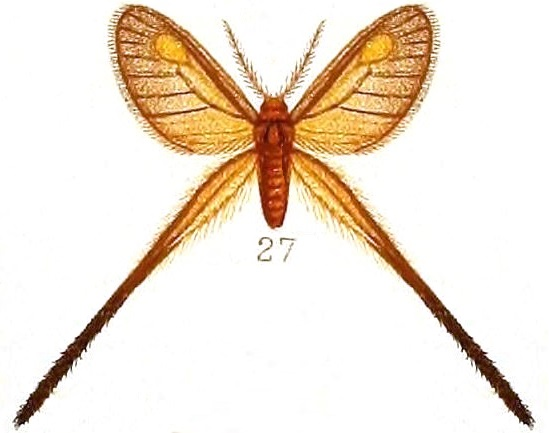
- Semioptila flavidiscata

Scientific classification
- Domain: Eukaryota
- Kingdom: Animalia
- Phylum: Arthropoda
- Class: Insecta
- Order: Lepidoptera
- Family: Himantopteridae
- Genus: Semioptila; Butler, 1887

= Semioptila =

Genus of moths

Semioptila is a genus of moths in the family Himantopteridae.

== Species ==
- Semioptila ansorgei Rothschild, 1907
- Semioptila axine Hering, 1937
- Semioptila banghaasi Hering, 1937
- Semioptila brachyura Hering, 1937
- Semioptila brevicauda Hering, 1937
- Semioptila constans Hering, 1937
- Semioptila dolicholoba Hampson, 1919
- Semioptila flavidiscata Hamson, 1910
- Semioptila fulveolans Mabille, 1897
- Semioptila hedydipna Kiriakoff, 1954
- Semioptila hilaris Rebel, 1906
- Semioptila hyalina Talbot, 1926
- Semioptila latifulva Hampson, 1919
- Semioptila longipennis Hering, 1937
- Semioptila lufirensis Joicey & Talbot, 1921
- Semioptila lydia Weymer, 1908
- Semioptila macrodipteryx Kiriakoff, 1954
- Semioptila marshalli Rothschild, 1907
- Semioptila monochroma Hering, 1932
- Semioptila opaca Hering, 1937
- Semioptila overlaeti Hering, 1937
- Semioptila papilionaria Walker, 1864
- Semioptila psalidoprocne Kiriakoff, 1954
- Semioptila satanas Hering, 1937
- Semioptila semiflava Talbot, 1928
- Semioptila seminigra Talbot, 1928
- Semioptila spatulipennis Hering, 1937
- Semioptila splendida Hering, 1937
- Semioptila stenopteryx Hering, 1932
- Semioptila torta Butler, 1877
- Semioptila trogoloba Hampson, 1919
- Semioptila ursula Hering, 1937
- Semioptila vinculum Hering, 1937
