= Ichneumon annulatorius =

- Ichneumon annulatorius

Scientific classification
- Kingdom: Animalia
- Phylum: Arthropoda
- Clade: Pancrustacea
- Class: Insecta
- Order: Hymenoptera
- Family: Ichneumonidae
- Genus: Ichneumon
- Species: I. annulatorius

Binomial name
- Ichneumon annulatorius Fabricius, 1775

Synonyms
- Ichneumon funestus Cresson, 1864; Ichneumon haesitans Provancher, 1875

Species of wasp

Ichneumon annulatorius is a species of parasitoid wasp. It is native to Canada and the United States, from Newfoundland south to Virginia and west to Iowa.
