= Constantin Wesmael =

Belgian entomologist (1798–1872)

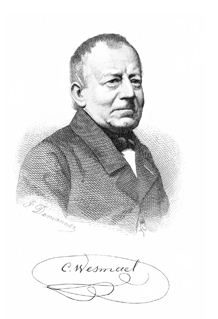
Constantin Wesmael

Constantin Wesmael (4 October 1798, in Brussels – 26 October 1872, near to Saint-Josse-ten-Noode) was a Belgian entomologist.

== Life ==
Of modest origin, he was granted a bursary to study law. He taught, initially, humanities in Charleroi before teaching sciences at the Athenaeum of Brussels. He was, next a professor of zoology at the school of veterinary surgeon and agriculture. He specialized in Ichneumonidae.

== Collection ==
According to a note made by Baron de Sélys Longchamps, Wesmael gave his Braconidae to Mr. Haliday, without knowing however that this Irish scientist would be later established in Italy, and that after his death his collection would pass via Edward Perceval Wright to Dublin Museum. However, in the copy of the biography of Wesmael by Selys, Dr. Jacobs noted next to the sentence written by Selys (p. 235) (He gave his Braconides to Mr. Haliday), this note:: Error! they were found by me... Both statements are true and Wesmael's Braconidae are divided between the National Museum of Ireland and the Royal Belgian Institute of Natural Sciences. Some are also in La Specola Museum in Florence having been given by Haliday to Camillo Rondani.

Hesitating about his decision to give his collection of Ichneumonidae to the British Museum of Natural History he finally entrusted it to Royal Belgian Institute of Natural Sciences.

== Works ==
- Monographie des Braconides de Belgique 252p.+ 70p. + 166 p. - 4 pl. (1 hand coloured) 1835–1838. A very rare work.
- Remarques critiques sur diverses espèces d'Ichneumons de la coll. Gravenhorst 99 p. 1859
- Tentamen dispositionis methodicae Ichneumonum Belgii 4to - 238 p. - with 1 lithographed plate 1844.
