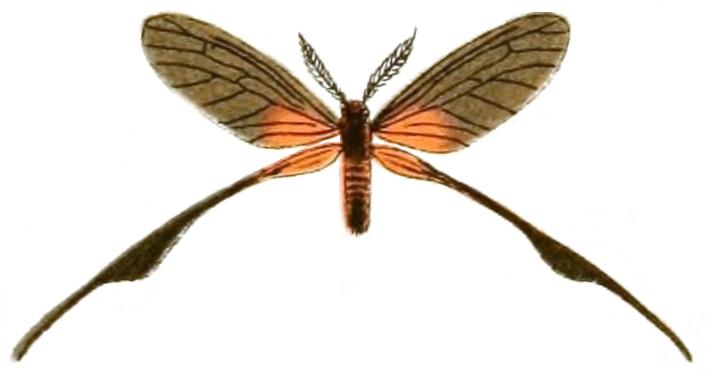
- Pseudothymara staudingeri

Scientific classification
- Kingdom: Animalia
- Phylum: Arthropoda
- Clade: Pancrustacea
- Class: Insecta
- Order: Lepidoptera
- Superfamily: Zygaenoidea
- Family: Himantopteridae; Rogenhofer, 1884

= Himantopteridae =

Family of moths

The Himantopteridae are a family of moths in the superfamily Zygaenoidea. The family is alternatively included in the family Anomoeotidae as a synonym.

== Distribution and habitat ==
This moth occurs in Africa and tropical Asia.

== Genera ==
- Doratopteryx
- Himantopterus
- Pedoptila
- Pseudothymara
- Semioptila
