= Eilema flexistriata =

Scientific classification
- Domain: Eukaryota
- Kingdom: Animalia
- Phylum: Arthropoda
- Class: Insecta
- Order: Lepidoptera
- Superfamily: Noctuoidea
- Family: Erebidae
- Subfamily: Arctiinae
- Genus: Eilema
- Species: E. flexistriata

Binomial name
- Eilema flexistriata (Butler, 1882)

Synonyms
- Prabhasa flexistriata Butler, 1882; Eilema angulosa Saalmüller, 1884; Prabhasa angustata Butler, 1882

Species of moth

Eilema flexistriata is a moth of the subfamily Arctiinae. It is found in Madagascar.
