= Eilema diliensis =

Scientific classification
- Kingdom: Animalia
- Phylum: Arthropoda
- Clade: Pancrustacea
- Class: Insecta
- Order: Lepidoptera
- Superfamily: Noctuoidea
- Family: Erebidae
- Subfamily: Arctiinae
- Genus: Eilema
- Species: E. diliensis

Binomial name
- Eilema diliensis Holloway, 1979

Species of moth

Eilema diliensis is a moth of the subfamily Arctiinae. It is found in New Caledonia.
