= Eilema bipartita =

Scientific classification
- Kingdom: Animalia
- Phylum: Arthropoda
- Class: Insecta
- Order: Lepidoptera
- Superfamily: Noctuoidea
- Family: Erebidae
- Subfamily: Arctiinae
- Genus: Eilema
- Species: E. bipartita

Binomial name
- Eilema bipartita Aurivillius, 1910

Species of moth

Eilema bipartita is a moth of the subfamily Arctiinae. It is found in Tanzania and Uganda.
