= Eilema honei =

Scientific classification
- Domain: Eukaryota
- Kingdom: Animalia
- Phylum: Arthropoda
- Class: Insecta
- Order: Lepidoptera
- Superfamily: Noctuoidea
- Family: Erebidae
- Subfamily: Arctiinae
- Genus: Eilema
- Species: E. honei

Binomial name
- Eilema honei (Daniel, 1954)

Synonyms
- Lithosia honei Daniel, 1954

Species of moth

Eilema honei is a moth of the subfamily Arctiinae. It is found in China.
