= Eilema phaeocraspis =

Scientific classification
- Kingdom: Animalia
- Phylum: Arthropoda
- Class: Insecta
- Order: Lepidoptera
- Superfamily: Noctuoidea
- Family: Erebidae
- Subfamily: Arctiinae
- Genus: Eilema
- Species: E. phaeocraspis

Binomial name
- Eilema phaeocraspis (Hampson, 1901)

Synonyms
- Ilema phaeocraspis Hampson, 1901; Lophilema phaeocraspis (Hampson, 1901)

Species of moth

Eilema phaeocraspis is a moth of the subfamily Arctiinae. It was described by George Hampson in 1901. It is found in Kenya and Tanzania.
