= Eilema polioplaga =

Scientific classification
- Kingdom: Animalia
- Phylum: Arthropoda
- Class: Insecta
- Order: Lepidoptera
- Superfamily: Noctuoidea
- Family: Erebidae
- Subfamily: Arctiinae
- Genus: Eilema
- Species: E. polioplaga

Binomial name
- Eilema polioplaga (Hampson, 1901)

Synonyms
- Macrosia polioplaga Hampson, 1901; Lophilema sordida Aurivillius, 1910; Lophilema polioplaga (Hampson, 1901)

Species of moth

Eilema polioplaga is a moth of the subfamily Arctiinae. It was described by George Hampson in 1901. It is found in Kenya and Tanzania.
