= Eilema bueana =

Scientific classification
- Kingdom: Animalia
- Phylum: Arthropoda
- Class: Insecta
- Order: Lepidoptera
- Superfamily: Noctuoidea
- Family: Erebidae
- Subfamily: Arctiinae
- Genus: Eilema
- Species: E. bueana

Binomial name
- Eilema bueana Strand, 1912

Synonyms
- Ilema costiplicata Hampson, 1918

Species of moth

Eilema bueana is a moth of the subfamily Arctiinae. It was described by Strand in 1912. It is found in Cameroon.
