= Eilema hybrida =

Scientific classification
- Kingdom: Animalia
- Phylum: Arthropoda
- Class: Insecta
- Order: Lepidoptera
- Superfamily: Noctuoidea
- Family: Erebidae
- Subfamily: Arctiinae
- Genus: Eilema
- Species: E. hybrida

Binomial name
- Eilema hybrida Toulgoët, 1957

Species of moth

Eilema hybrida is a moth of the subfamily Arctiinae. It was described by Hervé de Toulgoët in 1957.

== Distribution ==
It is found on Madagascar.

== Description ==
This species has a wingspan of 37 mm for the males and 50 mm for the females.

== Subspecies ==
- Eilema hybrida hybrida
- Eilema hybrida griveaudiana Toulgoët, 1985
- Eilema hybrida oberthueri Toulgoët, 1957
- Eilema hybrida sogai Toulgoët, 1985
- Eilema hybrida vadoniana Toulgoët, 1985
