= Eilema sordida =

Scientific classification
- Kingdom: Animalia
- Phylum: Arthropoda
- Clade: Pancrustacea
- Class: Insecta
- Order: Lepidoptera
- Superfamily: Noctuoidea
- Family: Erebidae
- Subfamily: Arctiinae
- Genus: Eilema
- Species: E. sordida

Binomial name
- Eilema sordida (Butler, 1882)

Synonyms
- Sozusa sordida Butler, 1882

Species of moth

Eilema sordida is a moth of the subfamily Arctiinae. It was described by Arthur Gardiner Butler in 1882. It is found in Madagascar and Somalia.
