= Eilema auriflua =

Scientific classification
- Kingdom: Animalia
- Phylum: Arthropoda
- Class: Insecta
- Order: Lepidoptera
- Superfamily: Noctuoidea
- Family: Erebidae
- Subfamily: Arctiinae
- Genus: Eilema
- Species: E. auriflua

Binomial name
- Eilema auriflua (Moore, 1878)

Synonyms
- Systropha dorsalis Moore, 1878; Systropha auriflua Moore, 1878; Lithosia sthenoptera Hampson, 1896

Species of moth

Eilema auriflua is a moth of the subfamily Arctiinae first described by Frederic Moore in 1878. It is found in the Bengal region of India and Bangladesh and the Indian states of Assam and Sikkim.
