= Eilema maculosa =

Scientific classification
- Kingdom: Animalia
- Phylum: Arthropoda
- Clade: Pancrustacea
- Class: Insecta
- Order: Lepidoptera
- Superfamily: Noctuoidea
- Family: Erebidae
- Subfamily: Arctiinae
- Genus: Eilema
- Species: E. maculosa

Binomial name
- Eilema maculosa (Saalmüller, 1884)

Synonyms
- Prabhasa maculosa Saalmüller, 1884

Species of moth

Eilema maculosa is a moth of the subfamily Arctiinae. It was described by Saalmüller in 1884. It is found in Madagascar.
