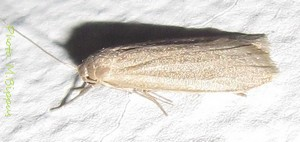
- Eilema borbonica

Scientific classification
- Kingdom: Animalia
- Phylum: Arthropoda
- Class: Insecta
- Order: Lepidoptera
- Superfamily: Noctuoidea
- Family: Erebidae
- Subfamily: Arctiinae
- Genus: Eilema
- Species: E. borbonica

Binomial name
- Eilema borbonica Guillermet, 2011

= Eilema borbonica =

Species of moth

Eilema borbonica is a moth of the subfamily Arctiinae. It is endemic to Réunion.

It has a length of approx. 10–12 millimetres (0.39–0.47 in) and a wingspan of 20–22 mm (0.79–0.87 in).
