= Eilema gashorai =

Scientific classification
- Kingdom: Animalia
- Phylum: Arthropoda
- Class: Insecta
- Order: Lepidoptera
- Superfamily: Noctuoidea
- Family: Erebidae
- Subfamily: Arctiinae
- Genus: Eilema
- Species: E. gashorai

Binomial name
- Eilema gashorai Toulgoët, 1980

Synonyms
- Orphnitilema gashorai (Toulgoët, 1980)

Species of moth

Eilema gashorai is a moth of the subfamily Arctiinae. It was described by Hervé de Toulgoët in 1980. It is found in Rwanda.
