= Eilema fraterna =

Scientific classification
- Kingdom: Animalia
- Phylum: Arthropoda
- Clade: Pancrustacea
- Class: Insecta
- Order: Lepidoptera
- Superfamily: Noctuoidea
- Family: Erebidae
- Subfamily: Arctiinae
- Genus: Eilema
- Species: E. fraterna

Binomial name
- Eilema fraterna (Butler, 1887)

Synonyms
- Katha fraterna Butler, 1887

Species of moth

Eilema fraterna is a moth of the subfamily Arctiinae first described by Arthur Gardiner Butler in 1887. It is found on the Solomon Islands.

It was illustrated in Hampson's catalogue, plate XXIII, fig.5.
