= Eilema costalboides =

Scientific classification
- Kingdom: Animalia
- Phylum: Arthropoda
- Clade: Pancrustacea
- Class: Insecta
- Order: Lepidoptera
- Superfamily: Noctuoidea
- Family: Erebidae
- Subfamily: Arctiinae
- Genus: Eilema
- Species: E. costalboides

Binomial name
- Eilema costalboides Holloway, 2001

Species of moth

Eilema costalboides is a moth of the subfamily Arctiinae. It is found on Borneo. The habitat consists of montane forests.

The length of the forewings is 9 mm for males and 12 mm for females. The forewings are dark grey, finely lined with whitish at the costa. The hindwings are dark grey.
