= Eilema laurenconi =

Scientific classification
- Kingdom: Animalia
- Phylum: Arthropoda
- Clade: Pancrustacea
- Class: Insecta
- Order: Lepidoptera
- Superfamily: Noctuoidea
- Family: Erebidae
- Subfamily: Arctiinae
- Genus: Eilema
- Species: E. laurenconi

Binomial name
- Eilema laurenconi Toulgoët, 1976

Species of moth

Eilema laurenconi is a moth of the subfamily Arctiinae. It was described by Hervé de Toulgoët in 1976. It is found on Madagascar.
