= Eilema costalba =

Scientific classification
- Domain: Eukaryota
- Kingdom: Animalia
- Phylum: Arthropoda
- Class: Insecta
- Order: Lepidoptera
- Superfamily: Noctuoidea
- Family: Erebidae
- Subfamily: Arctiinae
- Genus: Eilema
- Species: E. costalba

Binomial name
- Eilema costalba (Wileman & South, 1919)

Synonyms
- Ilema costalba Wileman & South, 1919

Species of moth

Eilema costalba is a moth of the subfamily Arctiinae, first described by Alfred Ernest Wileman and Richard South in 1919. It is found on Luzon in the Philippines.
