= Eilema suspecta =

Scientific classification
- Kingdom: Animalia
- Phylum: Arthropoda
- Class: Insecta
- Order: Lepidoptera
- Superfamily: Noctuoidea
- Family: Erebidae
- Subfamily: Arctiinae
- Genus: Eilema
- Species: E. suspecta

Binomial name
- Eilema suspecta Toulgoët, 1960

Species of moth

Eilema suspecta is a moth of the subfamily Arctiinae. It was described by Hervé de Toulgoët in 1960. It is found on Madagascar.
