= Eilema fulminans =

Scientific classification
- Kingdom: Animalia
- Phylum: Arthropoda
- Clade: Pancrustacea
- Class: Insecta
- Order: Lepidoptera
- Superfamily: Noctuoidea
- Family: Erebidae
- Subfamily: Arctiinae
- Genus: Eilema
- Species: E. fulminans

Binomial name
- Eilema fulminans Toulgoët, 1960

Species of moth

Eilema fulminans is a moth of the subfamily Arctiinae. It was described by Hervé de Toulgoët in 1960. It is found in central Madagascar.

This species has a wingspan of 29–31 mm. The head, frons, palpi and thorax are red orange. Forewings are red orange.
