= Eilema fimbriata =

Scientific classification
- Domain: Eukaryota
- Kingdom: Animalia
- Phylum: Arthropoda
- Class: Insecta
- Order: Lepidoptera
- Superfamily: Noctuoidea
- Family: Erebidae
- Subfamily: Arctiinae
- Genus: Eilema
- Species: E. fimbriata

Binomial name
- Eilema fimbriata (Leech, 1890)

Synonyms
- Tegulata fimbriata Leech, 1890; Thysanoptyx fimbriata (Leech, 1890)

Species of moth

Eilema fimbriata is a moth of the subfamily Arctiinae first described by John Henry Leech in 1890. It is found in central China.
