= Eilema costimaculata =

Scientific classification
- Kingdom: Animalia
- Phylum: Arthropoda
- Class: Insecta
- Order: Lepidoptera
- Superfamily: Noctuoidea
- Family: Erebidae
- Subfamily: Arctiinae
- Genus: Eilema
- Species: E. costimaculata

Binomial name
- Eilema costimaculata Aurivillius, 1910

Synonyms
- Eilema costimacula

Species of moth

Eilema costimaculata is a moth of the subfamily Arctiinae described by Per Olof Christopher Aurivillius in 1910. It is found in Tanzania.
