= Eilema elophus =

Scientific classification
- Domain: Eukaryota
- Kingdom: Animalia
- Phylum: Arthropoda
- Class: Insecta
- Order: Lepidoptera
- Superfamily: Noctuoidea
- Family: Erebidae
- Subfamily: Arctiinae
- Genus: Eilema
- Species: E. elophus

Binomial name
- Eilema elophus (Rothschild, 1916)

Synonyms
- Ilema elophus Rothschild, 1916

Species of moth

Eilema elophus is a moth of the subfamily Arctiinae. It was described from Volcan Island.
