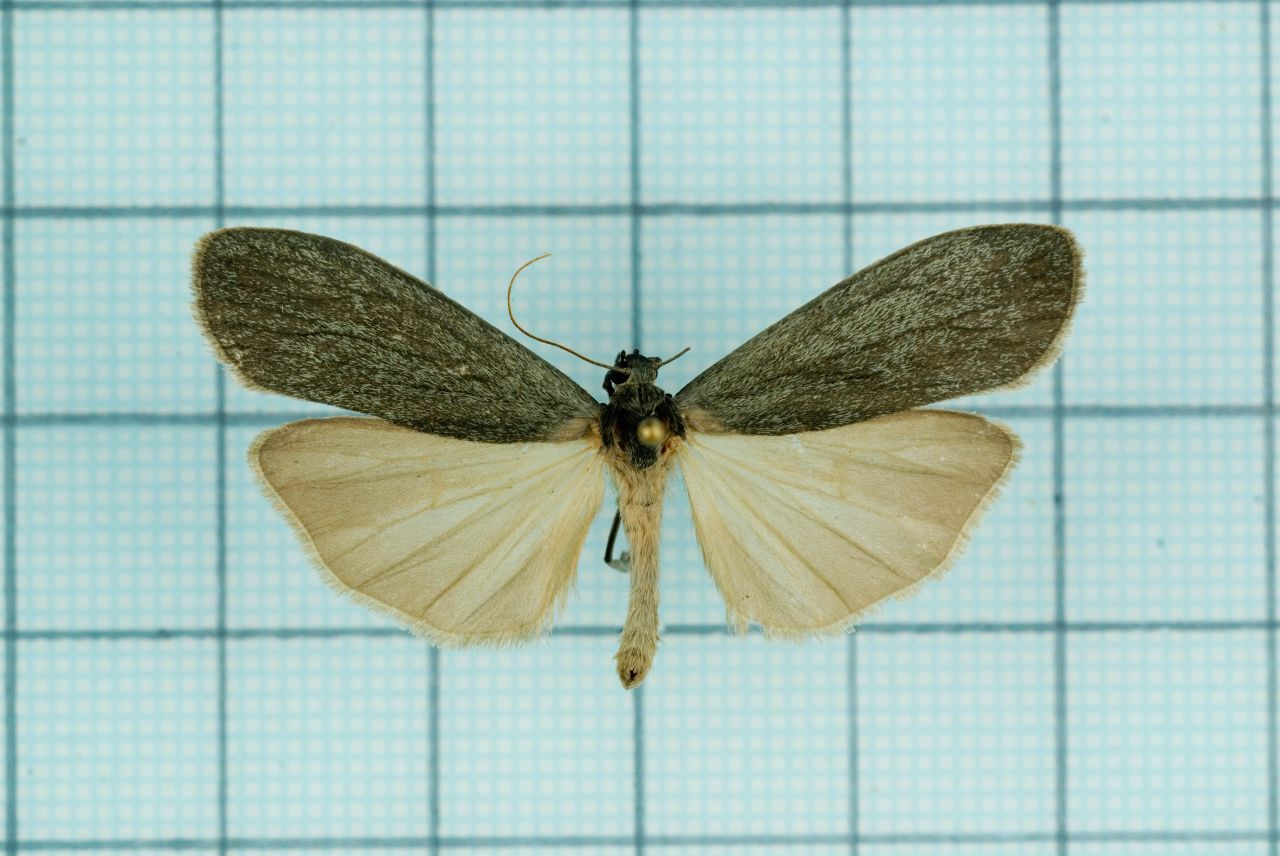
- Male
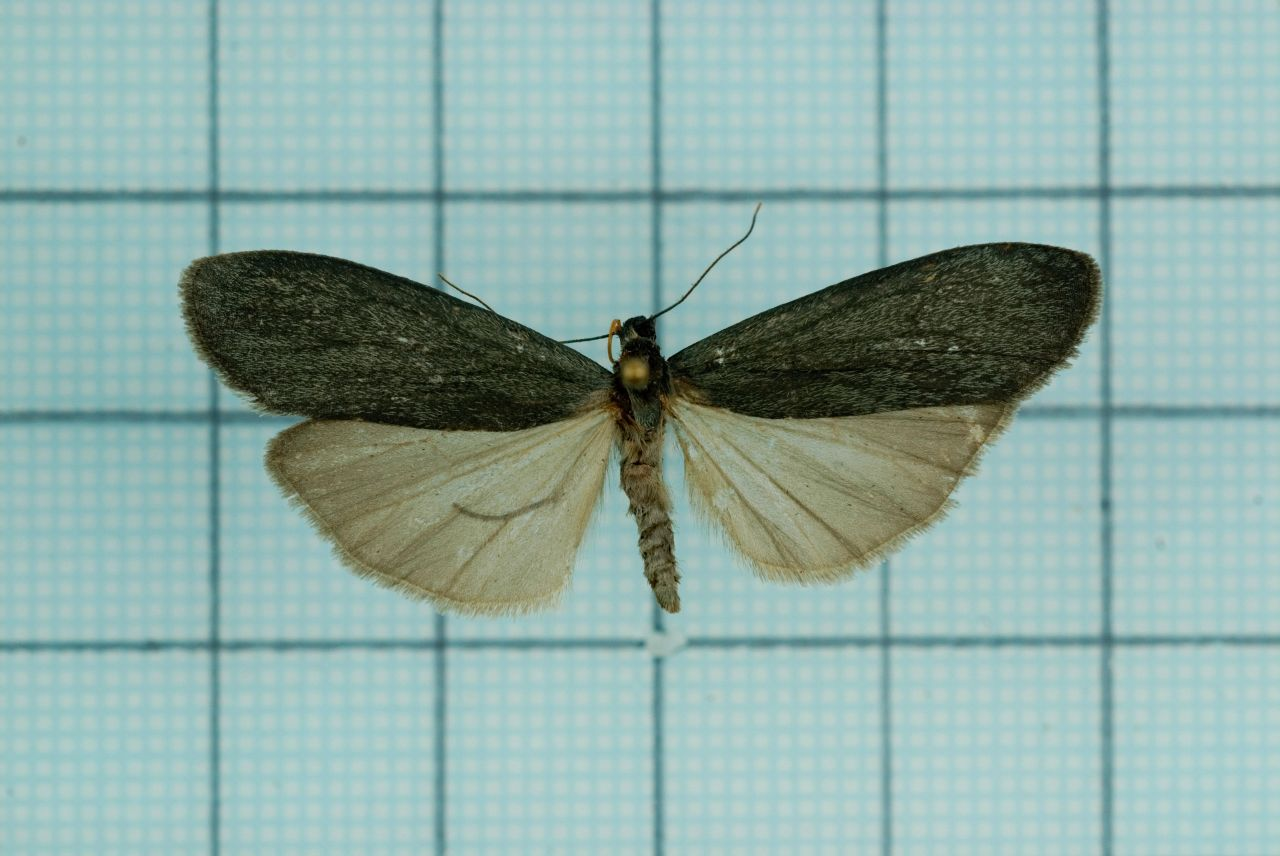
- Female

Scientific classification
- Kingdom: Animalia
- Phylum: Arthropoda
- Class: Insecta
- Order: Lepidoptera
- Superfamily: Noctuoidea
- Family: Erebidae
- Subfamily: Arctiinae
- Genus: Eilema
- Species: E. pulverea

Binomial name
- Eilema pulverea (Wileman, 1910)

Synonyms
- Ilema pulverea Wileman, 1910; Eilema schistaceola Strand, [1917]; Lithosia pulverea

= Eilema pulverea =

Species of moth

Eilema pulverea is a moth of the subfamily Arctiinae first described by Alfred Ernest Wileman in 1910. It is found in Taiwan.

The wingspan is 34–41 mm.
