= Eilema claudei =

Scientific classification
- Kingdom: Animalia
- Phylum: Arthropoda
- Class: Insecta
- Order: Lepidoptera
- Superfamily: Noctuoidea
- Family: Erebidae
- Subfamily: Arctiinae
- Genus: Eilema
- Species: E. claudei

Binomial name
- Eilema claudei Toulgoët, 1980

Species of moth

Eilema claudei is a moth of the subfamily Arctiinae. It was described by Hervé de Toulgoët in 1980. It is found in Cameroon.
