= Eilema contempta =

Scientific classification
- Domain: Eukaryota
- Kingdom: Animalia
- Phylum: Arthropoda
- Class: Insecta
- Order: Lepidoptera
- Superfamily: Noctuoidea
- Family: Erebidae
- Subfamily: Arctiinae
- Genus: Eilema
- Species: E. contempta

Binomial name
- Eilema contempta (Rothschild, 1924)

Synonyms
- Ilema contempta Rothschild, 1924

Species of moth

Eilema contempta is a moth of the subfamily Arctiinae. It was described by Rothschild in 1924. It is found in Africa.
