= Eilema protuberans =

Scientific classification
- Domain: Eukaryota
- Kingdom: Animalia
- Phylum: Arthropoda
- Class: Insecta
- Order: Lepidoptera
- Superfamily: Noctuoidea
- Family: Erebidae
- Subfamily: Arctiinae
- Genus: Eilema
- Species: E. protuberans

Binomial name
- Eilema protuberans (Moore, 1878)

Synonyms
- Tegulata protuberans Moore, 1878; Teulisna protuberans (Moore, 1878)

Species of moth

Eilema protuberans is a moth of the subfamily Arctiinae first described by Frederic Moore in 1878. It is found in the Indian state of Sikkim and Bhutan.
