= Eilema calamaria =

Scientific classification
- Domain: Eukaryota
- Kingdom: Animalia
- Phylum: Arthropoda
- Class: Insecta
- Order: Lepidoptera
- Superfamily: Noctuoidea
- Family: Erebidae
- Subfamily: Arctiinae
- Genus: Eilema
- Species: E. calamaria

Binomial name
- Eilema calamaria (Moore, 1878)

Synonyms
- Manulea calamaria Moore, 1878

Species of moth

Eilema calamaria is a moth of the subfamily Arctiinae first described by Frederic Moore in 1878. It is found in the north-western Himalayas.
