= Eilema angustipennis =

Scientific classification
- Kingdom: Animalia
- Phylum: Arthropoda
- Class: Insecta
- Order: Lepidoptera
- Superfamily: Noctuoidea
- Family: Erebidae
- Subfamily: Arctiinae
- Genus: Eilema
- Species: E. angustipennis

Binomial name
- Eilema angustipennis Strand, 1912

Synonyms
- Ilema pilosa Hampson, 1914; Eilema pilosa; Lophilema angustipennis (Strand, 1912)

Species of moth

Eilema angustipennis is a moth of the subfamily Arctiinae first described by Embrik Strand in 1912. It is found in Cameroon, Ghana and Uganda.
