= Eilema kuatunica =

Scientific classification
- Domain: Eukaryota
- Kingdom: Animalia
- Phylum: Arthropoda
- Class: Insecta
- Order: Lepidoptera
- Superfamily: Noctuoidea
- Family: Erebidae
- Subfamily: Arctiinae
- Genus: Eilema
- Species: E. kuatunica

Binomial name
- Eilema kuatunica (Daniel, 1954)

Synonyms
- Lithosia kuatunica Daniel, 1954

Species of moth

Eilema kuatunica is a moth of the subfamily Arctiinae. It is found in China.

== Bibliography ==
- Natural History Museum Lepidoptera generic names catalog
