= Eilema mabillei =

Scientific classification
- Domain: Eukaryota
- Kingdom: Animalia
- Phylum: Arthropoda
- Class: Insecta
- Order: Lepidoptera
- Superfamily: Noctuoidea
- Family: Erebidae
- Subfamily: Arctiinae
- Genus: Eilema
- Species: E. mabillei

Binomial name
- Eilema mabillei (Butler, 1882)

Synonyms
- Sozusa mabillei Butler, 1882

Species of moth

Eilema mabillei is a moth of the subfamily Arctiinae. It was described by Arthur Gardiner Butler in 1882. It is found in Madagascar.
