= Eilema fuscifrons =

Scientific classification
- Kingdom: Animalia
- Phylum: Arthropoda
- Class: Insecta
- Order: Lepidoptera
- Superfamily: Noctuoidea
- Family: Erebidae
- Subfamily: Arctiinae
- Genus: Eilema
- Species: E. fuscifrons

Binomial name
- Eilema fuscifrons (Hampson, 1905)

Synonyms
- Ilema fuscifrons Hampson, 1905

Species of moth

Eilema fuscifrons is a moth of the subfamily Arctiinae. It is found in New Guinea.
