= Eilema subcosteola =

Scientific classification
- Domain: Eukaryota
- Kingdom: Animalia
- Phylum: Arthropoda
- Class: Insecta
- Order: Lepidoptera
- Superfamily: Noctuoidea
- Family: Erebidae
- Subfamily: Arctiinae
- Genus: Eilema
- Species: E. subcosteola

Binomial name
- Eilema subcosteola (Druce, 1899)

Synonyms
- Lithosia subcosteola Druce, 1899

Species of moth

Eilema subcosteola is a moth of the subfamily Arctiinae. It is found in China.
