= Eilema marginata =

Scientific classification
- Kingdom: Animalia
- Phylum: Arthropoda
- Clade: Pancrustacea
- Class: Insecta
- Order: Lepidoptera
- Superfamily: Noctuoidea
- Family: Erebidae
- Subfamily: Arctiinae
- Genus: Eilema
- Species: E. marginata

Binomial name
- Eilema marginata (Guérin-Méneville, 1844)

Synonyms
- Lithosia marginata Guérin-Méneville, 1844

Species of moth

Eilema marginata is a moth of the subfamily Arctiinae. It was described by Félix Édouard Guérin-Méneville in 1844. It is found in Madagascar.
