= Eilema pseudoluteola =

Scientific classification
- Domain: Eukaryota
- Kingdom: Animalia
- Phylum: Arthropoda
- Class: Insecta
- Order: Lepidoptera
- Superfamily: Noctuoidea
- Family: Erebidae
- Subfamily: Arctiinae
- Genus: Eilema
- Species: E. pseudoluteola

Binomial name
- Eilema pseudoluteola Strand, 1922

Species of moth

Eilema pseudoluteola is a moth of the subfamily Arctiinae first described by Embrik Strand in 1922. It is found in Australia.
