= Eilema gainsfordi =

Scientific classification
- Domain: Eukaryota
- Kingdom: Animalia
- Phylum: Arthropoda
- Class: Insecta
- Order: Lepidoptera
- Superfamily: Noctuoidea
- Family: Erebidae
- Subfamily: Arctiinae
- Genus: Eilema
- Species: E. gainsfordi

Binomial name
- Eilema gainsfordi Kühne, 2010

Synonyms
- Olisbus gainsfordi (Kühne, 2010)

Species of moth

Eilema gainsfordi is a moth of the subfamily Arctiinae. It was described by Lars Kühne in 2010. It is found in South Africa.
