= Eilema infucata =

Scientific classification
- Domain: Eukaryota
- Kingdom: Animalia
- Phylum: Arthropoda
- Class: Insecta
- Order: Lepidoptera
- Superfamily: Noctuoidea
- Family: Erebidae
- Subfamily: Arctiinae
- Genus: Eilema
- Species: E. infucata

Binomial name
- Eilema infucata Kiriakoff, 1958

Species of moth

Eilema infucata is a moth of the subfamily Arctiinae. It was described by Sergius G. Kiriakoff in 1958. It is found in Uganda.
