= Eilema dorsti =

Scientific classification
- Kingdom: Animalia
- Phylum: Arthropoda
- Class: Insecta
- Order: Lepidoptera
- Superfamily: Noctuoidea
- Family: Erebidae
- Subfamily: Arctiinae
- Genus: Eilema
- Species: E. dorsti

Binomial name
- Eilema dorsti Toulgoët, 1977

Synonyms
- Brunia dorsti (Toulgoët, 1977)

Species of moth

Eilema dorsti is a moth of the subfamily Arctiinae. It was described by Hervé de Toulgoët in 1977. It is found in Ethiopia.
