= Eilema francki =

Scientific classification
- Domain: Eukaryota
- Kingdom: Animalia
- Phylum: Arthropoda
- Class: Insecta
- Order: Lepidoptera
- Superfamily: Noctuoidea
- Family: Erebidae
- Subfamily: Arctiinae
- Genus: Eilema
- Species: E. francki

Binomial name
- Eilema francki Guillermet, 2011

Species of moth

Eilema francki is a moth of the subfamily Arctiinae. It was described by Christian Guillermet in 2011. It is found on Réunion.
