= Eilema xantholeuca =

Scientific classification
- Kingdom: Animalia
- Phylum: Arthropoda
- Class: Insecta
- Order: Lepidoptera
- Superfamily: Noctuoidea
- Family: Erebidae
- Subfamily: Arctiinae
- Genus: Eilema
- Species: E. xantholeuca

Binomial name
- Eilema xantholeuca Toulgoët, 1954

Species of moth

Eilema xantholeuca is a moth of the subfamily Arctiinae first described by Hervé de Toulgoët in 1954. It is found on Madagascar.
