= Eilema longpala =

Scientific classification
- Domain: Eukaryota
- Kingdom: Animalia
- Phylum: Arthropoda
- Class: Insecta
- Order: Lepidoptera
- Superfamily: Noctuoidea
- Family: Erebidae
- Subfamily: Arctiinae
- Genus: Eilema
- Species: E. longpala

Binomial name
- Eilema longpala (Holloway, 2001)

Species of moth

Eilema longpala is a moth of the subfamily Arctiinae. It is found on Borneo. The habitat consists of alluvial forests and dry heath forests.

The length of the forewings is 13–14 mm. Adults are dull, pale orange in colour.
