= Eilema aurantiotestacea =

Scientific classification
- Kingdom: Animalia
- Phylum: Arthropoda
- Clade: Pancrustacea
- Class: Insecta
- Order: Lepidoptera
- Superfamily: Noctuoidea
- Family: Erebidae
- Subfamily: Arctiinae
- Genus: Eilema
- Species: E. aurantiotestacea

Binomial name
- Eilema aurantiotestacea (Rothschild, 1912)

Synonyms
- Ilema aurantiotestacea Rothschild, 1912

Species of moth

Eilema aurantiotestacea is a moth of the subfamily Arctiinae. It is found on Ambon Island.

Head and tegulae are orange; rest of thorax and apical half of abdomen black, basal half of abdomen grey. Forewing greyish orange-buff, apical and terminal fringe orange; a large, almost square, velvety black discal patch. Hindwing are orange-buff. Length of forewing: 12 mm
