= Eilema nubeculoides =

Scientific classification
- Kingdom: Animalia
- Phylum: Arthropoda
- Clade: Pancrustacea
- Class: Insecta
- Order: Lepidoptera
- Superfamily: Noctuoidea
- Family: Erebidae
- Subfamily: Arctiinae
- Genus: Eilema
- Species: E. nubeculoides

Binomial name
- Eilema nubeculoides (Holloway, 1982)

Synonyms
- Macotasa nubeculoides Holloway, 1982

Species of moth

Eilema nubeculoides is a moth of the subfamily Arctiinae. It is found in Malaysia.
