= Eilema umbripuncta =

Scientific classification
- Domain: Eukaryota
- Kingdom: Animalia
- Phylum: Arthropoda
- Class: Insecta
- Order: Lepidoptera
- Superfamily: Noctuoidea
- Family: Erebidae
- Subfamily: Arctiinae
- Genus: Eilema
- Species: E. umbripuncta

Binomial name
- Eilema umbripuncta (de Joannis, 1928)

Synonyms
- Ilema umbripuncta de Joannis, 1928

Species of moth

Eilema umbripuncta is a moth of the subfamily Arctiinae. It was first described by Joseph de Joannis in 1930 and is found in Vietnam.
