= Eilema squamata =

Scientific classification
- Domain: Eukaryota
- Kingdom: Animalia
- Phylum: Arthropoda
- Class: Insecta
- Order: Lepidoptera
- Superfamily: Noctuoidea
- Family: Erebidae
- Subfamily: Arctiinae
- Genus: Eilema
- Species: E. squamata

Binomial name
- Eilema squamata (Pagenstecher, 1886)

Synonyms
- Tegulata squamata Pagenstecher, 1886

Species of moth

Eilema squamata is a moth of the subfamily Arctiinae. It is found on Aru and Ambon Island.
