= Eilema testaceoflava =

Scientific classification
- Domain: Eukaryota
- Kingdom: Animalia
- Phylum: Arthropoda
- Class: Insecta
- Order: Lepidoptera
- Superfamily: Noctuoidea
- Family: Erebidae
- Subfamily: Arctiinae
- Genus: Eilema
- Species: E. testaceoflava

Binomial name
- Eilema testaceoflava (Rothschild, 1912)

Synonyms
- Ilema testaceoflava Rothschild, 1912

Species of moth

Eilema testaceoflava is a moth of the subfamily Arctiinae. It is found in New Guinea.
