= Eilema nigrociliata =

Scientific classification
- Domain: Eukaryota
- Kingdom: Animalia
- Phylum: Arthropoda
- Class: Insecta
- Order: Lepidoptera
- Superfamily: Noctuoidea
- Family: Erebidae
- Subfamily: Arctiinae
- Genus: Eilema
- Species: E. nigrociliata

Binomial name
- Eilema nigrociliata Aurivillius, 1909

Species of moth

Eilema nigrociliata is a moth of the subfamily Arctiinae that is known from South-West Madagascar.

The holotype of this species was collected in Andranohinaly, it is of yellow colour with some black spots/markings.
