= Eilema niveata =

Scientific classification
- Domain: Eukaryota
- Kingdom: Animalia
- Phylum: Arthropoda
- Class: Insecta
- Order: Lepidoptera
- Superfamily: Noctuoidea
- Family: Erebidae
- Subfamily: Arctiinae
- Genus: Eilema
- Species: E. niveata

Binomial name
- Eilema niveata (Rothschild, 1912)

Synonyms
- Ilema niveata Rothschild, 1912

Species of moth

Eilema niveata is a moth of the subfamily Arctiinae. It is found in New Guinea.
