= Eilema pseudocretacea =

Scientific classification
- Kingdom: Animalia
- Phylum: Arthropoda
- Clade: Pancrustacea
- Class: Insecta
- Order: Lepidoptera
- Superfamily: Noctuoidea
- Family: Erebidae
- Subfamily: Arctiinae
- Genus: Eilema
- Species: E. pseudocretacea

Binomial name
- Eilema pseudocretacea Holloway, 2001

Species of moth

Eilema pseudocretacea is a moth of the subfamily Arctiinae. It is found on Borneo. The habitat consists of lower montane forests.

The length of the forewings is 13–14 mm.
