= Eilema degenerella =

Scientific classification
- Kingdom: Animalia
- Phylum: Arthropoda
- Class: Insecta
- Order: Lepidoptera
- Superfamily: Noctuoidea
- Family: Erebidae
- Subfamily: Arctiinae
- Genus: Eilema
- Species: E. degenerella

Binomial name
- Eilema degenerella (Walker, 1863)

Synonyms
- Rupela degenerella Walker, 1863; Ilema degenerella; Lithosia alba Moore, 1877; Systropha nivosa Butler, 1879; Eilema nivosa

Species of moth

Eilema degenerella is a moth of the subfamily Arctiinae first described by Francis Walker in 1863. It is found in Japan and China.
