= Eilema arculifera =

Scientific classification
- Domain: Eukaryota
- Kingdom: Animalia
- Phylum: Arthropoda
- Class: Insecta
- Order: Lepidoptera
- Superfamily: Noctuoidea
- Family: Erebidae
- Subfamily: Arctiinae
- Genus: Eilema
- Species: E. arculifera

Binomial name
- Eilema arculifera (Felder, 1874)

Synonyms
- Eucreagra arculifera Felder, 1874; Eilema arculifera natalica Strand, 1912

Species of moth

Eilema arculifera is a moth of the subfamily Arctiinae. It is found in South Africa.
