= Eilema kingdoni =

Scientific classification
- Domain: Eukaryota
- Kingdom: Animalia
- Phylum: Arthropoda
- Class: Insecta
- Order: Lepidoptera
- Superfamily: Noctuoidea
- Family: Erebidae
- Subfamily: Arctiinae
- Genus: Eilema
- Species: E. kingdoni

Binomial name
- Eilema kingdoni (Butler, 1877)

Synonyms
- Lithosia kingdoni Butler, 1877; Sozusa albicans Butler, 1882

Species of moth

Eilema kingdoni is a moth of the subfamily Arctiinae first described by Arthur Gardiner Butler in 1877. It is found on Mayotte and Madagascar.
