= Eilema amaurus =

Scientific classification
- Kingdom: Animalia
- Phylum: Arthropoda
- Clade: Pancrustacea
- Class: Insecta
- Order: Lepidoptera
- Superfamily: Noctuoidea
- Family: Erebidae
- Subfamily: Arctiinae
- Genus: Eilema
- Species: E. amaurus

Binomial name
- Eilema amaurus Rothschild, 1916

Species of moth

Eilema amaurus is a moth of the subfamily Arctiinae. It is found on the Admiralty Islands, from Manus, (Papua New Guinea).

It has a brown antennae; head and tegulae orange-buft, rest of thorax dull brownish grey tinged with buff, abdomen buff, suffused with grey basally. Forewing : costal third orange-buff, rest mauve-grey suffused with buff. Hindwing buff. Length of forewing: 11 mm. Expanse: 25 mm
