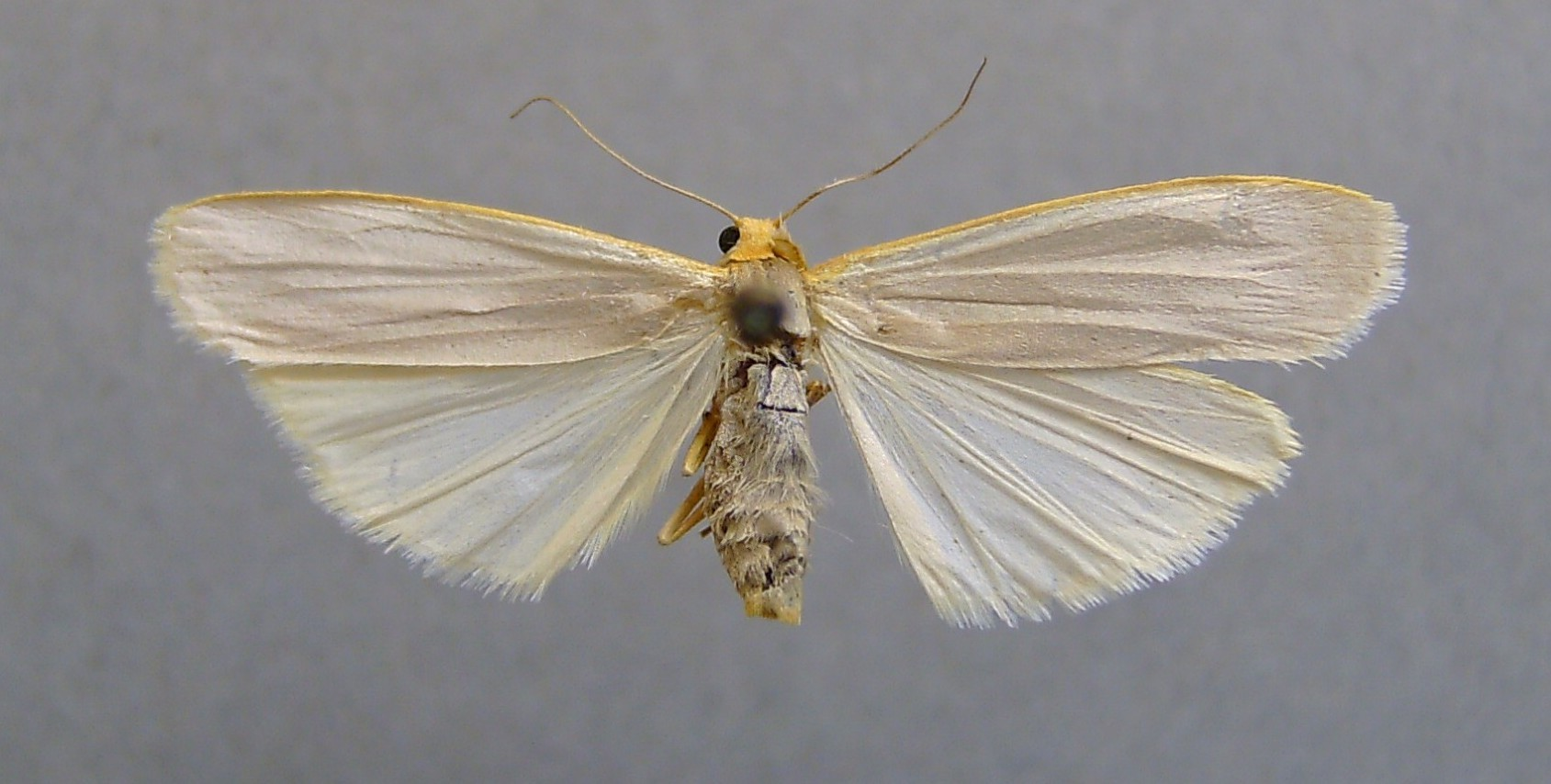
- Eilema caniola

Scientific classification
- Kingdom: Animalia
- Phylum: Arthropoda
- Clade: Pancrustacea
- Class: Insecta
- Order: Lepidoptera
- Superfamily: Noctuoidea
- Family: Erebidae
- Subfamily: Arctiinae
- Subtribe: Lithosiina
- Genus: Eilema; Hübner, 1819

Synonyms
- Hilema Agassiz, 1847; Eucreagra Felder, 1874; Ilema Hampson, 1900 (preocc.); Lophilema Aurivillius, 1910; Crocosia Hampson, 1914

= Eilema =

Genus of moths

Eilema is a genus of moths in the subfamily Arctiinae. The genus was erected by Jacob Hübner in 1819.

== Taxonomy ==
After a 2011 revision, all the species but one, E. caniola, have been moved to other genera.

The genera formerly included in Eilema are:

- Asiapistosia Dubatolov & Kishida, 2012
- Capissa Moore, 1878
- Collita Moore, 1878
- Dolgoma Moore, 1878
- Gandhara Moore, 1878
- Katha Moore, 1878
- Manulea Wallengren, 1863
- Muscula Koçak, 1991
- Prabhasa Moore, 1878
- Tarika Moore, 1878
- Wittia de Freina, 1980
- Zadadra Moore, 1878
- Zobida Birket-Smith, 1965

== Species ==
- Eilema caniola Hübner, 1808

== Former Eilema species ==
- Eilema aistleitneri
- Eilema albescens
- Eilema albicosta
- Eilema albidella
- Eilema albidula
- Eilema albostriatum
- Eilema aldabrensis
- Eilema alluaudi
- Eilema amaura
- Eilema amaurus
- Eilema angustipennis
- Eilema angustula
- Eilema arculifera
- Eilema ardens
- Eilema argentea
- Eilema arizana
- Eilema arizona
- Eilema aspersa
- Eilema aspersoides
- Eilema aurantioflava
- Eilema aurantiotestacea
- Eilema aurantisquamata
- Eilema auriflua
- Eilema aurora
- Eilema barbata
- Eilema basinota
- Eilema bicolor
- Eilema bifasciata
- Eilema bilati
- Eilema bipartita
- Eilema birkensmithi
- Eilema bitincta
- Eilema borbonica
- Eilema brevivalva
- Eilema brunnea
- Eilema brunneotincta
- Eilema bueana
- Eilema caffrana
- Eilema calamaria
- Eilema caledonica Holloway, 1979 (from New Caledonia)
- Eilema cana
- Eilema carbunculosa
- Eilema carnea
- Eilema catalai
- Eilema catenata
- Eilema celsicola
- Eilema chinchilla
- Eilema chrysophlebs
- Eilema cirrochroa
- Eilema claudei
- Eilema cocciniceps
- Eilema cohabitans
- Eilema comma
- Eilema comorensis
- Eilema conisphora
- Eilema conspicua
- Eilema contempta
- Eilema contorta
- Eilema contradicta
- Eilema costalba
- Eilema costalboides
- Eilema costimaculata
- Eilema costipuncta
- Eilema cramboides
- Eilema crassicosta
- Eilema creatoplaga
- Eilema cretacea
- Eilema cribroides
- Eilema croceibasis
- Eilema cuneata
- Eilema curviplaga
- Eilema danieli
- Eilema debilissima
- Eilema decaryi
- Eilema degenerella
- Eilema diliensis
- Eilema discifera
- Eilema distigma
- Eilema distinguenda
- Eilema dorsti
- Eilema elegans
- Eilema elophus
- Eilema fasciata
- Eilema fasciatella
- Eilema fasciculosa
- Eilema fibriata
- Eilema fimbriata
- Eilema flammea
- Eilema flavibasis
- Eilema flavicosta
- Eilema fletcheri
- Eilema flexistriata
- Eilema formosa
- Eilema formosicola
- Eilema francki
- Eilema fraterna
- Eilema fulminans
- Eilema fuscifrons
- Eilema fuscipes
- Eilema gainsfordi
- Eilema gashorai
- Eilema goniophora
- Eilema goniophoroides
- Eilema gracilipennis
- Eilema griseoflava
- Eilema griveaudi
- Eilema heimi
- Eilema heterogyna
- Eilema homochroma
- Eilema honei
- Eilema hova
- Eilema humbloti
- Eilema hybrida
- Eilema iluopsis
- Eilema incertula
- Eilema inconspicualis
- Eilema inducta
- Eilema infucata
- Eilema inornata
- Eilema insignis
- Eilema instabilis
- Eilema intermixta
- Eilema interpositella
- Eilema iuniformis
- Eilema karenkona
- Eilema khasiana
- Eilema kingdoni
- Eilema kuatunica
- Eilema lachesis
- Eilema lamprocraspis
- Eilema laurenconi
- Eilema leia
- Eilema lemur
- Eilema leopoldi
- Eilema lepta
- Eilema leucanicula
- Eilema lividula
- Eilema longpala
- Eilema lutescens
- Eilema mabillei
- Eilema maculosa
- Eilema margarita
- Eilema marginata
- Eilema marguerita
- Eilema marioni
- Eilema marwitziana
- Eilema melanothorax
- Eilema melasonea
- Eilema mesosticta
- Eilema minutissima
- Eilema monochroma
- Eilema nebra
- Eilema nebuliferella
- Eilema nebulosa
- Eilema nicticans
- Eilema nigripes
- Eilema nigrociliata
- Eilema nigrosparsa
- Eilema niveata
- Eilema nonagrioides
- Eilema notifera
- Eilema nubeculoides
- Eilema ochroleuca
- Eilema okiensis
- Eilema pallidicosta
- Eilema pauliani
- Eilema paupercula
- Eilema peperita
- Eilema persephone
- Eilema peyrierasi
- Eilema phaeocraspis
- Eilema phaeopera
- Eilema phantasma
- Eilema plana
- Eilema plantei
- Eilema polioplaga
- Eilema prabhasana
- Eilema proleuca
- Eilema proleucodes
- Eilema protuberans
- Eilema pseudocretacea
- Eilema pseudofasciata
- Eilema pseudoluteola
- Eilema pseudosimplex
- Eilema pseudosoror
- Eilema pulverea
- Eilema pulvereola
- Eilema pulverosa
- Eilema punctifera
- Eilema punctistriata
- Eilema purpureotincta
- Eilema pusilana
- Eilema pustulata
- Eilema quadrangula
- Eilema quadrisignata
- Eilema ranrunensis
- Eilema ratonella
- Eilema ratonis
- Eilema recticosta
- Eilema rubiginea
- Eilema rubrescens
- Eilema rufitincta
- Eilema rufofasciata
- Eilema sabulosula
- Eilema saitonis
- Eilema sakia
- Eilema sandakana
- Eilema sanguicosta
- Eilema sarceola
- Eilema semibrunnea
- Eilema semperi
- Eilema setiniformis
- Eilema signata
- Eilema similipuncta
- Eilema simplex
- Eilema simulatricula
- Eilema sokotrensis
- Eilema sordida
- Eilema squalida
- Eilema squamata
- Eilema stevensii
- Eilema strangulata
- Eilema subcosteola
- Eilema suspecta
- Eilema taiwana
- Eilema taiwanella
- Eilema tardenota
- Eilema tegudentata
- Eilema terminalis
- Eilema testaceoflava
- Eilema tomponis
- Eilema tonseana
- Eilema transducta
- Eilema trichopteroides
- Eilema tricolor
- Eilema tricolorana
- Eilema trimacula
- Eilema triplaiola
- Eilema trispilota
- Eilema tristis
- Eilema umbrigera
- Eilema umbripuncta
- Eilema uniola
- Eilema uniplaga
- Eilema unipuncta
- Eilema usuguronis
- Eilema vanbraekeli
- Eilema vicara
- Eilema vicinula
- Eilema viettei
- Eilema violitincta
- Eilema virgineola
- Eilema voeltzkowi
- Eilema xantholeuca
