= Eilema nebra =

Scientific classification
- Domain: Eukaryota
- Kingdom: Animalia
- Phylum: Arthropoda
- Class: Insecta
- Order: Lepidoptera
- Superfamily: Noctuoidea
- Family: Erebidae
- Subfamily: Arctiinae
- Genus: Eilema
- Species: E. nebra

Binomial name
- Eilema nebra (Wileman & West, 1928)

Synonyms
- Ilema nebra Wileman & West, 1928

Species of moth

Eilema nebra is a moth of the subfamily Arctiinae. It is found in the Philippines.
