= Eilema brevivalva =

Scientific classification
- Kingdom: Animalia
- Phylum: Arthropoda
- Clade: Pancrustacea
- Class: Insecta
- Order: Lepidoptera
- Superfamily: Noctuoidea
- Family: Erebidae
- Subfamily: Arctiinae
- Genus: Eilema
- Species: E. brevivalva

Binomial name
- Eilema brevivalva Holloway, 2001

Species of moth

Eilema brevivalva is a moth of the subfamily Arctiinae. It is found on Borneo. The habitat consists of lower montane forests.

The length of the forewings is 11–13 mm for males and 12–13 mm for females.
