= Eilema aurora =

Scientific classification
- Domain: Eukaryota
- Kingdom: Animalia
- Phylum: Arthropoda
- Class: Insecta
- Order: Lepidoptera
- Superfamily: Noctuoidea
- Family: Erebidae
- Subfamily: Arctiinae
- Genus: Eilema
- Species: E. aurora

Binomial name
- Eilema aurora Rothschild, 1916

Species of moth

Eilema aurora is a moth of the subfamily Arctiinae first described by Walter Rothschild in 1916. It is found in New Guinea.
