= Eilema cana =

Scientific classification
- Kingdom: Animalia
- Phylum: Arthropoda
- Class: Insecta
- Order: Lepidoptera
- Superfamily: Noctuoidea
- Family: Erebidae
- Subfamily: Arctiinae
- Genus: Eilema
- Species: E. cana

Binomial name
- Eilema cana (Hampson, 1896)

Synonyms
- Prabhasa cana Hampson, 1896

Species of moth

Eilema cana is a moth of the subfamily Arctiinae first described by George Hampson in 1896. It is found in Assam, India.
