= Eilema trimacula =

Scientific classification
- Kingdom: Animalia
- Phylum: Arthropoda
- Clade: Pancrustacea
- Class: Insecta
- Order: Lepidoptera
- Superfamily: Noctuoidea
- Family: Erebidae
- Subfamily: Arctiinae
- Genus: Eilema
- Species: E. trimacula

Binomial name
- Eilema trimacula Holloway, 2001

Species of moth

Eilema trimacula is a moth of the subfamily Arctiinae. It is found on Borneo. The habitat consists of lowland dipterocarp forests, alluvial forests and lower montane forests.

The length of the forewings is 11–12 mm for males and 11–13 mm for females.
