= Eilema melasonea =

Scientific classification
- Kingdom: Animalia
- Phylum: Arthropoda
- Class: Insecta
- Order: Lepidoptera
- Superfamily: Noctuoidea
- Family: Erebidae
- Subfamily: Arctiinae
- Genus: Eilema
- Species: E. melasonea

Binomial name
- Eilema melasonea (Hampson, 1903)

Synonyms
- Ilema melasonea Hampson, 1903

Species of moth

Eilema melasonea is a moth of the subfamily Arctiinae. It was described by George Hampson in 1903. It is found in Ethiopia and Kenya.
