= Eilema creatoplaga =

Scientific classification
- Kingdom: Animalia
- Phylum: Arthropoda
- Class: Insecta
- Order: Lepidoptera
- Superfamily: Noctuoidea
- Family: Erebidae
- Subfamily: Arctiinae
- Genus: Eilema
- Species: E. creatoplaga

Binomial name
- Eilema creatoplaga (Hampson, 1901)

Synonyms
- Ilema creatoplaga Hampson, 1901; Eilema androconia Heyn, 1904

Species of moth

Eilema creatoplaga is a moth of the subfamily Arctiinae. It is found in the Democratic Republic of Congo, Kenya, South Africa and Uganda.
