= Eilema amaura =

Scientific classification
- Kingdom: Animalia
- Phylum: Arthropoda
- Class: Insecta
- Order: Lepidoptera
- Superfamily: Noctuoidea
- Family: Erebidae
- Subfamily: Arctiinae
- Genus: Eilema
- Species: E. amaura

Binomial name
- Eilema amaura (E. M. Hering, 1932)

Synonyms
- Ilema amaura Hering, 1932

Species of moth

Eilema amaura is a moth of the subfamily Arctiinae first described by Erich Martin Hering in 1932. It is found in the Democratic Republic of the Congo.
