= Eilema plana =

Scientific classification
- Domain: Eukaryota
- Kingdom: Animalia
- Phylum: Arthropoda
- Class: Insecta
- Order: Lepidoptera
- Superfamily: Noctuoidea
- Family: Erebidae
- Subfamily: Arctiinae
- Genus: Eilema
- Species: E. plana

Binomial name
- Eilema plana (Boisduval, 1832)

Synonyms
- Lithosia plana Boisduval, 1832; Brunia repleta Lucas, 1890; Tigrioides xanthopleura Turner, 1899; Ilema costistrigata Bethune-Baker, 1904

Species of moth

Eilema plana, the little white lichen moth, is a moth of the subfamily Arctiinae. The species was first described by Jean Baptiste Boisduval in 1832. It is found in the Australian states of Queensland, New South Wales and Victoria.
