= Eilema chrysophlebs =

Scientific classification
- Kingdom: Animalia
- Phylum: Arthropoda
- Class: Insecta
- Order: Lepidoptera
- Superfamily: Noctuoidea
- Family: Erebidae
- Subfamily: Arctiinae
- Genus: Eilema
- Species: E. chrysophlebs

Binomial name
- Eilema chrysophlebs (Hampson, 1895)

Synonyms
- Lithosia chrysophlebs Hampson, 1895; Eilema chrysophleps

Species of moth

Eilema chrysophlebs is a moth of the subfamily Arctiinae first described by George Hampson in 1895. It is found in Bhutan.
