= Eilema debilissima =

Scientific classification
- Domain: Eukaryota
- Kingdom: Animalia
- Phylum: Arthropoda
- Class: Insecta
- Order: Lepidoptera
- Superfamily: Noctuoidea
- Family: Erebidae
- Subfamily: Arctiinae
- Genus: Eilema
- Species: E. debilissima

Binomial name
- Eilema debilissima Kiriakoff, 1958

Synonyms
- Leptilema debilissima (Kiriakoff, 1958)

Species of moth

Eilema debilissima is a moth of the subfamily Arctiinae. It was described by Sergius G. Kiriakoff in 1958. It is found in Kenya and Uganda.
