= Eilema fuscipes =

Scientific classification
- Kingdom: Animalia
- Phylum: Arthropoda
- Class: Insecta
- Order: Lepidoptera
- Superfamily: Noctuoidea
- Family: Erebidae
- Subfamily: Arctiinae
- Genus: Eilema
- Species: E. fuscipes

Binomial name
- Eilema fuscipes (Hampson, 1893)

Synonyms
- Systropha fuscipes Hampson, 1893

Species of moth

Eilema fuscipes is a moth of the subfamily Arctiinae first described by George Hampson in 1893. It is found in Sri Lanka.
