= Eilema aspersa =

Scientific classification
- Kingdom: Animalia
- Phylum: Arthropoda
- Class: Insecta
- Order: Lepidoptera
- Superfamily: Noctuoidea
- Family: Erebidae
- Subfamily: Arctiinae
- Genus: Eilema
- Species: E. aspersa

Binomial name
- Eilema aspersa (Butler, 1882)

Synonyms
- Sozusa aspersa Butler, 1882

Species of moth

Eilema aspersa is a moth belonging to the subfamily Arctiinae first described by Arthur Gardiner Butler in 1882. It can be found in Madagascar.
