= Eilema stevensii =

Scientific classification
- Kingdom: Animalia
- Phylum: Arthropoda
- Class: Insecta
- Order: Lepidoptera
- Superfamily: Noctuoidea
- Family: Erebidae
- Subfamily: Arctiinae
- Genus: Eilema
- Species: E. stevensii

Binomial name
- Eilema stevensii (Hampson, 1900)

Synonyms
- Sozusa stevensii Hampson, 1900; Phasmatilema stevensii (Holland, 1892)

Species of moth

Eilema stevensii is a moth of the subfamily Arctiinae. It was described by George Hampson in 1900. It is found in Tanzania.
