= Eilema transducta =

Scientific classification
- Domain: Eukaryota
- Kingdom: Animalia
- Phylum: Arthropoda
- Class: Insecta
- Order: Lepidoptera
- Superfamily: Noctuoidea
- Family: Erebidae
- Subfamily: Arctiinae
- Genus: Eilema
- Species: E. transducta

Binomial name
- Eilema transducta (de Joannis, 1930)

Synonyms
- Ilema transducta de Joannis, 1930

Species of moth

Eilema transducta is a moth of the subfamily Arctiinae. It was first described by Joseph de Joannis in 1930 and is found in Vietnam.
