= Eilema basinota =

Scientific classification
- Domain: Eukaryota
- Kingdom: Animalia
- Phylum: Arthropoda
- Class: Insecta
- Order: Lepidoptera
- Superfamily: Noctuoidea
- Family: Erebidae
- Subfamily: Arctiinae
- Genus: Eilema
- Species: E. basinota

Binomial name
- Eilema basinota (Moore, [1866])

Synonyms
- Lithosia basinota Moore, [1866]; Simareea lurida Butler, 1889

Species of moth

Eilema basinota is a moth of the subfamily Arctiinae first described by Frederic Moore in 1866. It is found in the Indian state of Sikkim and the north-western Himalayas.

== Subspecies ==
- Eilema basinota basinota
- Eilema basinota lurida (Butler, 1889) (Himalayas)
