= Eilema ardens =

Scientific classification
- Kingdom: Animalia
- Phylum: Arthropoda
- Class: Insecta
- Order: Lepidoptera
- Superfamily: Noctuoidea
- Family: Erebidae
- Subfamily: Arctiinae
- Genus: Eilema
- Species: E. ardens

Binomial name
- Eilema ardens (Butler, 1882)

Synonyms
- Prabhasa ardens Butler, 1882; Lithosia subrosea Mabille, 1898; Eilema subrosea

Species of moth

Eilema ardens is a moth of the subfamily Arctiinae first described by Arthur Gardiner Butler in 1882. It is found in Madagascar.
