= Eilema bitincta =

Scientific classification
- Kingdom: Animalia
- Phylum: Arthropoda
- Clade: Pancrustacea
- Class: Insecta
- Order: Lepidoptera
- Superfamily: Noctuoidea
- Family: Erebidae
- Subfamily: Arctiinae
- Genus: Eilema
- Species: E. bitincta

Binomial name
- Eilema bitincta Rothschild, 1924

Species of moth

Eilema bitincta is a moth of the subfamily Arctiinae. It is found in Madagascar.
