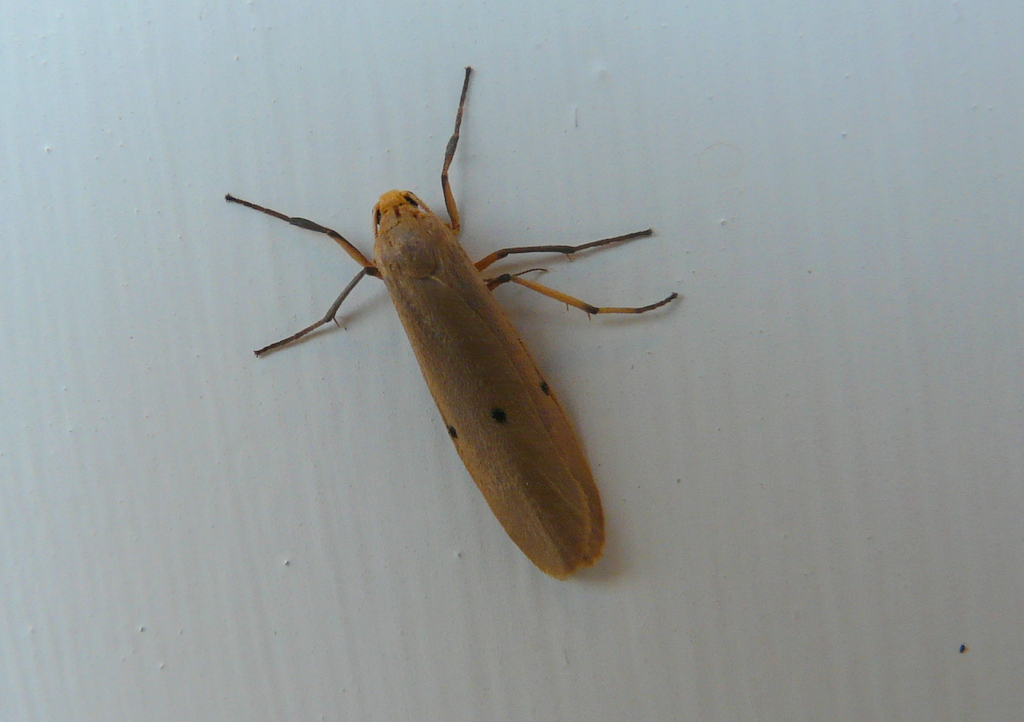

Scientific classification
- Kingdom: Animalia
- Phylum: Arthropoda
- Class: Insecta
- Order: Lepidoptera
- Superfamily: Noctuoidea
- Family: Erebidae
- Subfamily: Arctiinae
- Genus: Eilema
- Species: E. similipuncta

Binomial name
- Eilema similipuncta Hampson, 1914

= Eilema similipuncta =

Species of moth

Eilema similipuncta is a moth of the subfamily Arctiinae. It is found in South Africa and Zimbabwe.

The larvae feed on lichens.
