= Eilema proleucodes =

Scientific classification
- Domain: Eukaryota
- Kingdom: Animalia
- Phylum: Arthropoda
- Class: Insecta
- Order: Lepidoptera
- Superfamily: Noctuoidea
- Family: Erebidae
- Subfamily: Arctiinae
- Genus: Eilema
- Species: E. proleucodes

Binomial name
- Eilema proleucodes Kiriakoff, 1958

Synonyms
- Gracililema proleucodes (Kiriakoff, 1958)

Species of moth

Eilema proleucodes is a moth of the subfamily Arctiinae. It was described by Sergius G. Kiriakoff in 1958. It is found in Uganda.
