= Eilema albostriatum =

Scientific classification
- Kingdom: Animalia
- Phylum: Arthropoda
- Class: Insecta
- Order: Lepidoptera
- Superfamily: Noctuoidea
- Family: Erebidae
- Subfamily: Arctiinae
- Genus: Eilema
- Species: E. albostriatum

Binomial name
- Eilema albostriatum Kühne, 2010

Synonyms
- Leptilema albostriatum (Kühne, 2010)

Species of moth

Eilema albostriatum is a moth of the subfamily Arctiinae first described by Lars Kühne in 2010. It is found in Namibia and South Africa.
