= Eilema simplex =

Scientific classification
- Kingdom: Animalia
- Phylum: Arthropoda
- Class: Insecta
- Order: Lepidoptera
- Superfamily: Noctuoidea
- Family: Erebidae
- Subfamily: Arctiinae
- Genus: Eilema
- Species: E. simplex

Binomial name
- Eilema simplex (Walker, 1862)

Synonyms
- Lithosia simplex Walker, 1862; Lithosia microxantha Hampson, 1894

Species of moth

Eilema simplex is a moth of the subfamily Arctiinae first described by Francis Walker in 1862. It is found in Myanmar and on Borneo.
