= Eilema virgineola =

Scientific classification
- Kingdom: Animalia
- Phylum: Arthropoda
- Class: Insecta
- Order: Lepidoptera
- Superfamily: Noctuoidea
- Family: Erebidae
- Subfamily: Arctiinae
- Genus: Eilema
- Species: E. virgineola

Binomial name
- Eilema virgineola (Hampson, 1900)

Synonyms
- Ilema virgineola Hampson, 1900

Species of moth

Eilema virgineola is a moth of the subfamily Arctiinae. It is found in South Africa.
