= Eilema iuniformis =

Scientific classification
- Kingdom: Animalia
- Phylum: Arthropoda
- Class: Insecta
- Order: Lepidoptera
- Superfamily: Noctuoidea
- Family: Erebidae
- Subfamily: Arctiinae
- Genus: Eilema
- Species: E. iuniformis

Binomial name
- Eilema iuniformis (Hampson, 1894)

Synonyms
- Lophoneura iuniformis Hampson, 1894

Species of moth

Eilema iuniformis is a moth of the subfamily Arctiinae. It is found in Burma.
