= Eilema albescens =

Scientific classification
- Kingdom: Animalia
- Phylum: Arthropoda
- Class: Insecta
- Order: Lepidoptera
- Superfamily: Noctuoidea
- Family: Erebidae
- Subfamily: Arctiinae
- Genus: Eilema
- Species: E. albescens

Binomial name
- Eilema albescens (Aurivillius, 1910)

Synonyms
- Phryganopsis albescens Aurivillius, 1910

Species of moth

Eilema albescens is a moth of the subfamily Arctiinae first described by Per Olof Christopher Aurivillius in 1910. It is found in Tanzania and Uganda.
