= Eilema paupercula =

Scientific classification
- Kingdom: Animalia
- Phylum: Arthropoda
- Class: Insecta
- Order: Lepidoptera
- Superfamily: Noctuoidea
- Family: Erebidae
- Subfamily: Arctiinae
- Genus: Eilema
- Species: E. paupercula

Binomial name
- Eilema paupercula Toulgoët, 1965

Species of moth

Eilema paupercula is a moth of the subfamily Arctiinae found on Madagascar. It was described by Hervé de Toulgoët in 1965.
