= Eilema contorta =

Scientific classification
- Kingdom: Animalia
- Phylum: Arthropoda
- Class: Insecta
- Order: Lepidoptera
- Superfamily: Noctuoidea
- Family: Erebidae
- Subfamily: Arctiinae
- Genus: Eilema
- Species: E. contorta

Binomial name
- Eilema contorta Fryer, 1912

Species of moth

Eilema contorta is a moth of the subfamily Arctiinae. It was described by John Fryer in 1912. It is found on the Seychelles.
