= Eilema semibrunnea =

Scientific classification
- Domain: Eukaryota
- Kingdom: Animalia
- Phylum: Arthropoda
- Class: Insecta
- Order: Lepidoptera
- Superfamily: Noctuoidea
- Family: Erebidae
- Subfamily: Arctiinae
- Genus: Eilema
- Species: E. semibrunnea

Binomial name
- Eilema semibrunnea (Heylaerts, 1891)

Synonyms
- Lithosia semibrunnea Heylaerts, 1891

Species of moth

Eilema semibrunnea is a moth of the subfamily Arctiinae. It is found on Java.
