= Eilema goniophoroides =

Scientific classification
- Kingdom: Animalia
- Phylum: Arthropoda
- Class: Insecta
- Order: Lepidoptera
- Superfamily: Noctuoidea
- Family: Erebidae
- Subfamily: Arctiinae
- Genus: Eilema
- Species: E. goniophoroides

Binomial name
- Eilema goniophoroides Strand, 1912

Species of moth

Eilema goniophoroides is a moth of the subfamily Arctiinae. It was described by Strand in 1912. It is found in Cameroon.
