= Eilema ochroleuca =

Scientific classification
- Domain: Eukaryota
- Kingdom: Animalia
- Phylum: Arthropoda
- Class: Insecta
- Order: Lepidoptera
- Superfamily: Noctuoidea
- Family: Erebidae
- Subfamily: Arctiinae
- Genus: Eilema
- Species: E. ochroleuca

Binomial name
- Eilema ochroleuca (Wileman & West, 1928)

Synonyms
- Ilema ochroleuca Wileman & West, 1928

Species of moth

Eilema ochroleuca is a moth of the subfamily Arctiinae. It is found in the Philippines.
