= Eilema aistleitneri =

Scientific classification
- Domain: Eukaryota
- Kingdom: Animalia
- Phylum: Arthropoda
- Class: Insecta
- Order: Lepidoptera
- Superfamily: Noctuoidea
- Family: Erebidae
- Subfamily: Arctiinae
- Genus: Eilema
- Species: E. aistleitneri

Binomial name
- Eilema aistleitneri Černý, 2013

Species of arctiid moth

Eilema aistleitneri is a species of arctiid moth found in Cape Verde. They have a wingspan of 20–25 mm (0.79–0.98 in) and are greyish and pale brown. The species was first discovered on Monte Grande at an elevation of 370 m (1,210 ft) on the island of Sal, Cape Verde. It is named after its discoverer, Eyjolf Aistleitner.
