= Eilema signata =

Scientific classification
- Kingdom: Animalia
- Phylum: Arthropoda
- Class: Insecta
- Order: Lepidoptera
- Superfamily: Noctuoidea
- Family: Erebidae
- Subfamily: Arctiinae
- Genus: Eilema
- Species: E. signata

Binomial name
- Eilema signata (Walker, 1854)

Synonyms
- Lithosia signata Walker, 1854; Lithosia brevimacula Alphéraky, 1897; Thysanoptyx directa Leech, 1899; Thysanoptyx signata (Walker, 1854)

Species of moth

Eilema signata is a moth of the subfamily Arctiinae first described by Francis Walker in 1854. It is found in northern China.
