= Eilema voeltzkowi =

Scientific classification
- Domain: Eukaryota
- Kingdom: Animalia
- Phylum: Arthropoda
- Class: Insecta
- Order: Lepidoptera
- Superfamily: Noctuoidea
- Family: Erebidae
- Subfamily: Arctiinae
- Genus: Eilema
- Species: E. voeltzkowi

Binomial name
- Eilema voeltzkowi Aurivillius, 1909

Species of moth

Eilema voeltzkowi is a moth of the subfamily Arctiinae first described by Per Olof Christopher Aurivillius in 1909. It is found on Madagascar.
