= Eilema fasciculosa =

Scientific classification
- Kingdom: Animalia
- Phylum: Arthropoda
- Class: Insecta
- Order: Lepidoptera
- Superfamily: Noctuoidea
- Family: Erebidae
- Subfamily: Arctiinae
- Genus: Eilema
- Species: E. fasciculosa

Binomial name
- Eilema fasciculosa (Walker, 1862)

Synonyms
- Lithosia fasciculosa Walker, 1862; Nishada testacea Rothschild, 1912; Nishada testacea angulata D. S. Fletcher, 1957; Nishada testacea minorata D. S. Fletcher, 1957; Nishada testacea truncata D. S. Fletcher, 1957

Species of moth

Eilema fasciculosa is a moth of the subfamily Arctiinae. It is found on Borneo, Peninsular Malaysia and Bali. The habitat consists of lowland forests, particularly alluvial forests.
