= Eilema pseudosimplex =

Scientific classification
- Kingdom: Animalia
- Phylum: Arthropoda
- Class: Insecta
- Order: Lepidoptera
- Superfamily: Noctuoidea
- Family: Erebidae
- Subfamily: Arctiinae
- Genus: Eilema
- Species: E. pseudosimplex

Binomial name
- Eilema pseudosimplex Toulgoët, 1977

Synonyms
- Brunia pseudosimplex (Toulgoët, 1977)

Species of moth

Eilema pseudosimplex is a moth of the subfamily Arctiinae. It was described by Hervé de Toulgoët in 1977. It is found in Kenya and Rwanda.
