= Eilema sarceola =

Scientific classification
- Kingdom: Animalia
- Phylum: Arthropoda
- Clade: Pancrustacea
- Class: Insecta
- Order: Lepidoptera
- Superfamily: Noctuoidea
- Family: Erebidae
- Subfamily: Arctiinae
- Genus: Eilema
- Species: E. sarceola

Binomial name
- Eilema sarceola (Hampson, 1900)

Synonyms
- Ilema sarceola Hampson, 1900; Eubaphilema sarceola (Hampson, 1900)

Species of moth

Eilema sarceola is a moth of the subfamily Arctiinae. It was described by George Hampson in 1900. It is found in South Africa.
