= Eilema cribroides =

Scientific classification
- Domain: Eukaryota
- Kingdom: Animalia
- Phylum: Arthropoda
- Class: Insecta
- Order: Lepidoptera
- Superfamily: Noctuoidea
- Family: Erebidae
- Subfamily: Arctiinae
- Genus: Eilema
- Species: E. cribroides

Binomial name
- Eilema cribroides (Kenrick, 1914)

Synonyms
- Ilema cribroides Kenrick, 1914

Species of moth

Eilema cribroides is a moth of the subfamily Arctiinae. It was described by George Hamilton Kenrick in 1914. It is found on Madagascar.
