= Eilema punctistriata =

Scientific classification
- Domain: Eukaryota
- Kingdom: Animalia
- Phylum: Arthropoda
- Class: Insecta
- Order: Lepidoptera
- Superfamily: Noctuoidea
- Family: Erebidae
- Subfamily: Arctiinae
- Genus: Eilema
- Species: E. punctistriata

Binomial name
- Eilema punctistriata (Butler, 1882)

Synonyms
- Sozusa punctistriata Butler, 1882; Eilema punctistriata f. randimbyi Toulgoët, 1957

Species of moth

Eilema punctistriata is a moth of the subfamily Arctiinae. It was described by Arthur Gardiner Butler in 1882. It is found on Madagascar.
