= Eilema caledonica =

Scientific classification
- Kingdom: Animalia
- Phylum: Arthropoda
- Clade: Pancrustacea
- Class: Insecta
- Order: Lepidoptera
- Superfamily: Noctuoidea
- Family: Erebidae
- Subfamily: Arctiinae
- Genus: Eilema
- Species: E. caledonica

Binomial name
- Eilema caledonica Holloway, 1979

Species of moth

Eilema caledonica is a moth of the subfamily Arctiinae first described by Jeremy Daniel Holloway in 1979. It is found in New Caledonia, , Mt. Koghis, 600m, east of Australia.
