= Eilema lutescens =

Scientific classification
- Domain: Eukaryota
- Kingdom: Animalia
- Phylum: Arthropoda
- Class: Insecta
- Order: Lepidoptera
- Superfamily: Noctuoidea
- Family: Erebidae
- Subfamily: Arctiinae
- Genus: Eilema
- Species: E. lutescens

Binomial name
- Eilema lutescens (Rothschild, 1912)

Synonyms
- Ilema lutescens Rothschild, 1912

Species of moth

Eilema lutescens is a moth of the subfamily Arctiinae. It is found on Sula.
