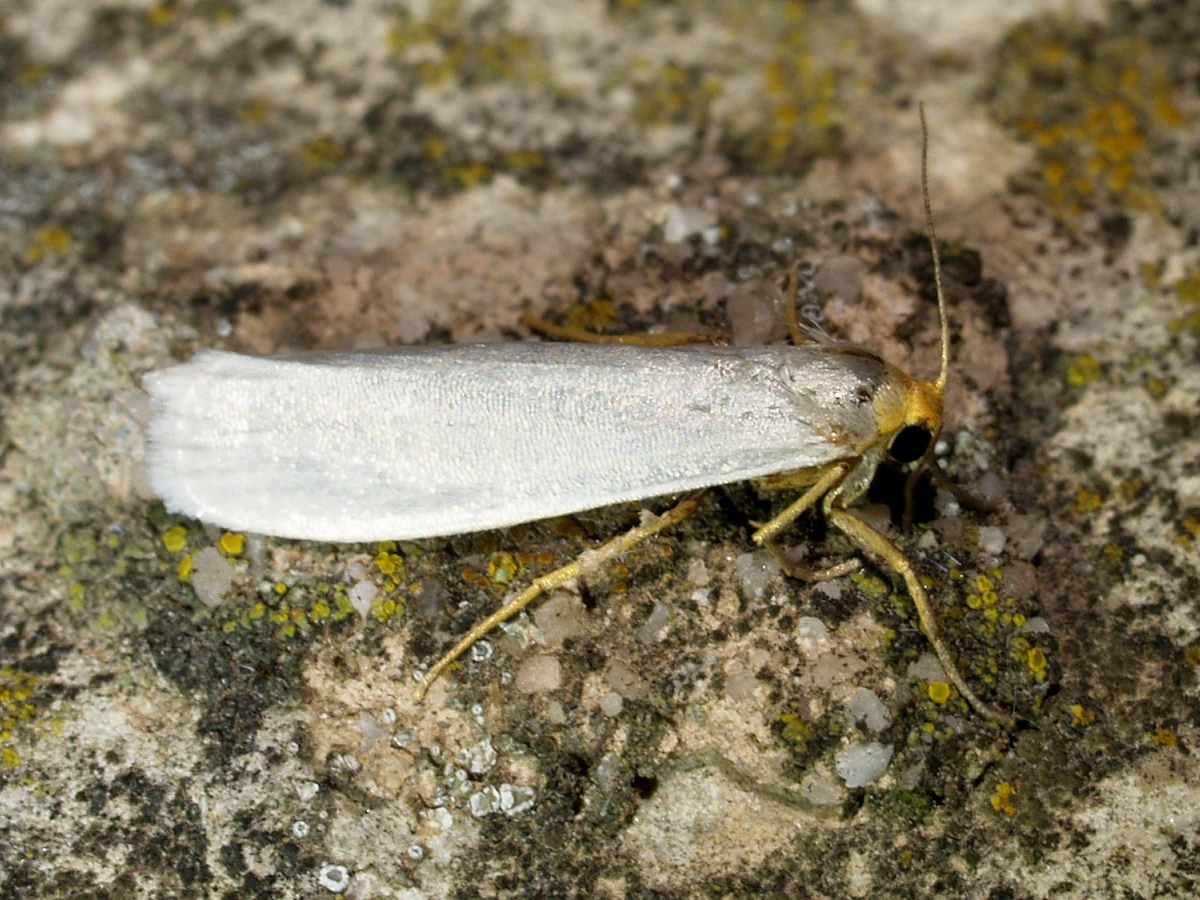
- Eilema interpositella

Scientific classification
- Domain: Eukaryota
- Kingdom: Animalia
- Phylum: Arthropoda
- Class: Insecta
- Order: Lepidoptera
- Superfamily: Noctuoidea
- Family: Erebidae
- Subfamily: Arctiinae
- Genus: Eilema
- Species: E. interpositella

Binomial name
- Eilema interpositella Strand, 1920

Synonyms
- Eilema interposita Rothschild, 1914

= Eilema interpositella =

Species of moth

Eilema interpositella is a moth of the subfamily Arctiinae. It was described by Embrik Strand in 1920. It is found in North Africa and on the Iberian Peninsula.
