= Eilema fibriata =

Scientific classification
- Domain: Eukaryota
- Kingdom: Animalia
- Phylum: Arthropoda
- Class: Insecta
- Order: Lepidoptera
- Superfamily: Noctuoidea
- Family: Erebidae
- Subfamily: Arctiinae
- Genus: Eilema
- Species: E. fibriata

Binomial name
- Eilema fibriata (Leech, 1890)

Synonyms
- Tegulata fibriata Leech, 1890

Species of moth

Eilema fibriata is a moth of the subfamily Arctiinae. It is found in China.
