= Eilema terminalis =

Scientific classification
- Domain: Eukaryota
- Kingdom: Animalia
- Phylum: Arthropoda
- Class: Insecta
- Order: Lepidoptera
- Superfamily: Noctuoidea
- Family: Erebidae
- Subfamily: Arctiinae
- Genus: Eilema
- Species: E. terminalis

Binomial name
- Eilema terminalis (Moore, 1878)

Synonyms
- Katha terminalis Moore, 1878; Katha terminalis ab. semifusca Elwes, 1890

Species of moth

Eilema terminalis is a moth of the subfamily Arctiinae. It is found in India (Sikkim).
