= Eilema argentea =

Scientific classification
- Kingdom: Animalia
- Phylum: Arthropoda
- Class: Insecta
- Order: Lepidoptera
- Superfamily: Noctuoidea
- Family: Erebidae
- Subfamily: Arctiinae
- Genus: Eilema
- Species: E. argentea

Binomial name
- Eilema argentea (Butler, 1878)

Synonyms
- Sozusa argentea Butler, 1878; Eilema infuscata

Species of moth

Eilema argentea is a moth of the subfamily Arctiinae first described by Arthur Gardiner Butler in 1878. It is found on Madagascar.

== Subspecies ==
- Eilema argentea argentea
- Eilema argentea infuscata Toulgoët, 1960
