= Eilema vanbraekeli =

Scientific classification
- Domain: Eukaryota
- Kingdom: Animalia
- Phylum: Arthropoda
- Class: Insecta
- Order: Lepidoptera
- Superfamily: Noctuoidea
- Family: Erebidae
- Subfamily: Arctiinae
- Genus: Eilema
- Species: E. vanbraekeli

Binomial name
- Eilema vanbraekeli Tams, 1935

Species of moth

Eilema vanbraekeli is a moth of the subfamily Arctiinae. It is found on Sulawesi.
