= Eilema uniplaga =

Scientific classification
- Kingdom: Animalia
- Phylum: Arthropoda
- Class: Insecta
- Order: Lepidoptera
- Superfamily: Noctuoidea
- Family: Erebidae
- Subfamily: Arctiinae
- Genus: Eilema
- Species: E. uniplaga

Binomial name
- Eilema uniplaga (Hampson, 1894)

Synonyms
- Teulisna uniplaga Hampson, 1894

Species of moth

Eilema uniplaga is a moth of the subfamily Arctiinae. It is found in Burma and on Borneo. The habitat consists of lowland forests.
