= Eilema peyrierasi =

Scientific classification
- Kingdom: Animalia
- Phylum: Arthropoda
- Class: Insecta
- Order: Lepidoptera
- Superfamily: Noctuoidea
- Family: Erebidae
- Subfamily: Arctiinae
- Genus: Eilema
- Species: E. peyrierasi

Binomial name
- Eilema peyrierasi Toulgoët, 1976

Species of moth

Eilema peyrierasi is a moth of the subfamily Arctiinae. It was described by Hervé de Toulgoët in 1976. It is found on Madagascar.
