= Eilema nigrosparsa =

Scientific classification
- Domain: Eukaryota
- Kingdom: Animalia
- Phylum: Arthropoda
- Class: Insecta
- Order: Lepidoptera
- Superfamily: Noctuoidea
- Family: Erebidae
- Subfamily: Arctiinae
- Genus: Eilema
- Species: E. nigrosparsa

Binomial name
- Eilema nigrosparsa (Butler, 1882)

Synonyms
- Prabhasa nigrosparsa Butler, 1882

Species of moth

Eilema nigrosparsa is a moth of the subfamily Arctiinae. It was described by Arthur Gardiner Butler in 1882. It is found in Madagascar.
