= Eilema khasiana =

Scientific classification
- Domain: Eukaryota
- Kingdom: Animalia
- Phylum: Arthropoda
- Class: Insecta
- Order: Lepidoptera
- Superfamily: Noctuoidea
- Family: Erebidae
- Subfamily: Arctiinae
- Genus: Eilema
- Species: E. khasiana

Binomial name
- Eilema khasiana (Rothschild, 1912)

Synonyms
- Scoliacma khasiana Rothschild, 1912; Ilema chasiana Rothschild, 1914; Eilema chasiana

Species of moth

Eilema khasiana is a moth of the subfamily Arctiinae first described by Walter Rothschild in 1912. It is found in the Khasi Hills of India.
