= Eilema viettei =

Scientific classification
- Kingdom: Animalia
- Phylum: Arthropoda
- Class: Insecta
- Order: Lepidoptera
- Superfamily: Noctuoidea
- Family: Erebidae
- Subfamily: Arctiinae
- Genus: Eilema
- Species: E. viettei

Binomial name
- Eilema viettei Toulgoët, 1954

Species of moth

Eilema viettei is a moth of the subfamily Arctiinae first described by Hervé de Toulgoët in 1954. It is found in Mauritius.
