= Eilema rufofasciata =

Scientific classification
- Domain: Eukaryota
- Kingdom: Animalia
- Phylum: Arthropoda
- Class: Insecta
- Order: Lepidoptera
- Superfamily: Noctuoidea
- Family: Erebidae
- Subfamily: Arctiinae
- Genus: Eilema
- Species: E. rufofasciata

Binomial name
- Eilema rufofasciata (Rothschild, 1912)

Synonyms
- Ilema rufofasciata Rothschild, 1912

Species of moth

Eilema rufofasciata is a moth of the subfamily Arctiinae. It was described by Rothschild in 1912. It is found in the Democratic Republic of Congo and Kenya.
