= Eilema nicticans =

Scientific classification
- Domain: Eukaryota
- Kingdom: Animalia
- Phylum: Arthropoda
- Class: Insecta
- Order: Lepidoptera
- Superfamily: Noctuoidea
- Family: Erebidae
- Subfamily: Arctiinae
- Genus: Eilema
- Species: E. nicticans

Binomial name
- Eilema nicticans (Bremer & Grey, 1853)

Synonyms
- Lithosia nicticans Bremer & Grey, 1853

Species of moth

Eilema nicticans is a moth of the subfamily Arctiinae. It is found in China.
