= Eilema conspicua =

Scientific classification
- Kingdom: Animalia
- Phylum: Arthropoda
- Class: Insecta
- Order: Lepidoptera
- Superfamily: Noctuoidea
- Family: Erebidae
- Subfamily: Arctiinae
- Genus: Eilema
- Species: E. conspicua

Binomial name
- Eilema conspicua Rothschild, 1924

Species of moth

Eilema conspicua is a moth of the subfamily Arctiinae. It was described by Walter Rothschild in 1924. It is found on Madagascar.

== Subspecies ==
- Eilema conspicua conspicua
- Eilema conspicua monticola Toulgoët, 1954
