= Eilema tricolor =

Scientific classification
- Domain: Eukaryota
- Kingdom: Animalia
- Phylum: Arthropoda
- Class: Insecta
- Order: Lepidoptera
- Superfamily: Noctuoidea
- Family: Erebidae
- Subfamily: Arctiinae
- Genus: Eilema
- Species: E. tricolor

Binomial name
- Eilema tricolor (Wileman, 1911)

Synonyms
- Ilema tricolor Wileman, 1911

Species of moth

Eilema tricolor is a moth of the subfamily Arctiinae. It is found in Taiwan.
