= Eilema bilati =

Scientific classification
- Kingdom: Animalia
- Phylum: Arthropoda
- Class: Insecta
- Order: Lepidoptera
- Superfamily: Noctuoidea
- Family: Erebidae
- Subfamily: Arctiinae
- Genus: Eilema
- Species: E. bilati

Binomial name
- Eilema bilati (Dufrane, 1945)

Synonyms
- Ilema bilati Dufrane, 1945

Species of moth

Eilema bilati is a moth of the subfamily Arctiinae. It is found in the Democratic Republic of Congo.
