= Eilema punctifera =

Scientific classification
- Kingdom: Animalia
- Phylum: Arthropoda
- Class: Insecta
- Order: Lepidoptera
- Superfamily: Noctuoidea
- Family: Erebidae
- Subfamily: Arctiinae
- Genus: Eilema
- Species: E. punctifera

Binomial name
- Eilema punctifera (Hampson, 1893)

Synonyms
- Katha punctifera Hampson, 1893

Species of moth

Eilema punctifera is a moth of the subfamily Arctiinae first described by George Hampson in 1893. It is found in Sri Lanka.

== Description ==
Its wingspan is 20 mm. Forewing with vein 9 stalked with veins 7 and 8. Forewing with the outer margin of moderate length. Male lack secondary sexual characters on the forewing. Head yellowish where thorax and forewing uniform yellowish brown. There is a dark spot at end of cell in forewings. Abdomen and hindwings are pale yellow in color. In female, the body is bright yellow in color, where the abdomen and hindwings are much paler.
