= Eilema lepta =

Scientific classification
- Domain: Eukaryota
- Kingdom: Animalia
- Phylum: Arthropoda
- Class: Insecta
- Order: Lepidoptera
- Superfamily: Noctuoidea
- Family: Erebidae
- Subfamily: Arctiinae
- Genus: Eilema
- Species: E. lepta

Binomial name
- Eilema lepta (Wileman & West, 1928)

Synonyms
- Nantala lepta Wileman & West, 1928

Species of moth

Eilema lepta is a moth of the subfamily Arctiinae. It is found in the Philippines.
