= Eilema pulvereola =

Scientific classification
- Kingdom: Animalia
- Phylum: Arthropoda
- Class: Insecta
- Order: Lepidoptera
- Superfamily: Noctuoidea
- Family: Erebidae
- Subfamily: Arctiinae
- Genus: Eilema
- Species: E. pulvereola

Binomial name
- Eilema pulvereola (Hampson, 1900)

Synonyms
- Ilema pulvereola Hampson, 1900

Species of moth

Eilema pulvereola is a moth of the subfamily Arctiinae first described by George Hampson in 1900. It is found on Borneo. The habitat consists of lowland forests of all types, including heath forests.
