= Eilema discifera =

Scientific classification
- Kingdom: Animalia
- Phylum: Arthropoda
- Class: Insecta
- Order: Lepidoptera
- Superfamily: Noctuoidea
- Family: Erebidae
- Subfamily: Arctiinae
- Genus: Eilema
- Species: E. discifera

Binomial name
- Eilema discifera (Hampson, 1900)

Synonyms
- Ilema discifera Hampson, 1900

Species of moth

Eilema discifera is a moth of the subfamily Arctiinae. It was described by George Hampson in 1900. It is found in South Africa.
