= Eilema cretacea =

Scientific classification
- Kingdom: Animalia
- Phylum: Arthropoda
- Class: Insecta
- Order: Lepidoptera
- Superfamily: Noctuoidea
- Family: Erebidae
- Subfamily: Arctiinae
- Genus: Eilema
- Species: E. cretacea

Binomial name
- Eilema cretacea (Hampson, 1911)

Synonyms
- Ilema cretacea Hampson, 1911

Species of moth

Eilema cretacea is a moth of the subfamily Arctiinae first described by George Hampson in 1911. It is found in Sikkim, India.
