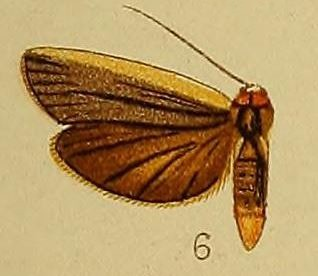

Scientific classification
- Kingdom: Animalia
- Phylum: Arthropoda
- Class: Insecta
- Order: Lepidoptera
- Superfamily: Noctuoidea
- Family: Erebidae
- Subfamily: Arctiinae
- Genus: Eilema
- Species: E. heterogyna

Binomial name
- Eilema heterogyna (Hampson, 1910)

Synonyms
- Ilema heterogyna Hampson, 1910; Parainesis heterogyna (Hampson, 1910)

= Eilema heterogyna =

Species of moth

Eilema heterogyna is a moth of the subfamily Arctiinae. It was described by George Hampson in 1910. It is found in Zambia.
