= Eilema okiensis =

Scientific classification
- Domain: Eukaryota
- Kingdom: Animalia
- Phylum: Arthropoda
- Class: Insecta
- Order: Lepidoptera
- Superfamily: Noctuoidea
- Family: Erebidae
- Subfamily: Arctiinae
- Genus: Eilema
- Species: E. okiensis

Binomial name
- Eilema okiensis (Miyake, 1907)

Synonyms
- Ilema okiensis Miyake, 1907

Species of moth

Eilema okiensis is a moth of the subfamily Arctiinae. It is found in Japan.
