= Eilema unipuncta =

Scientific classification
- Domain: Eukaryota
- Kingdom: Animalia
- Phylum: Arthropoda
- Class: Insecta
- Order: Lepidoptera
- Superfamily: Noctuoidea
- Family: Erebidae
- Subfamily: Arctiinae
- Genus: Eilema
- Species: E. unipuncta

Binomial name
- Eilema unipuncta (Staudinger, 1899)

Synonyms
- Lithosia unipuncta Staudinger, 1899

Species of moth

Eilema unipuncta is a moth of the subfamily Arctiinae. It is found in Palestine.
