= Eilema sandakana =

Scientific classification
- Domain: Eukaryota
- Kingdom: Animalia
- Phylum: Arthropoda
- Class: Insecta
- Order: Lepidoptera
- Superfamily: Noctuoidea
- Family: Erebidae
- Subfamily: Arctiinae
- Genus: Eilema
- Species: E. sandakana

Binomial name
- Eilema sandakana (Draudt, 1914)

Synonyms
- Lithosia brevipennis sandakana Draudt, 1914

Species of moth

Eilema sandakana is a moth of the subfamily Arctiinae. It is found on Borneo.
