= Eilema distigma =

Scientific classification
- Domain: Eukaryota
- Kingdom: Animalia
- Phylum: Arthropoda
- Class: Insecta
- Order: Lepidoptera
- Superfamily: Noctuoidea
- Family: Erebidae
- Subfamily: Arctiinae
- Genus: Eilema
- Species: E. distigma

Binomial name
- Eilema distigma Turner, 1940

Synonyms
- Aldoea distigma Turner, 1940

Species of moth

Eilema distigma is a moth of the subfamily Arctiinae. It is found in Queensland.
