= Eilema griseoflava =

Scientific classification
- Domain: Eukaryota
- Kingdom: Animalia
- Phylum: Arthropoda
- Class: Insecta
- Order: Lepidoptera
- Superfamily: Noctuoidea
- Family: Erebidae
- Subfamily: Arctiinae
- Genus: Eilema
- Species: E. griseoflava

Binomial name
- Eilema griseoflava (Rothschild, 1912)

Synonyms
- Nishada griseoflava Rothschild, 1912

Species of moth

Eilema griseoflava is a moth of the subfamily Arctiinae first described by Walter Rothschild in 1912. It is found in the Philippines.
