= Eilema alluaudi =

Scientific classification
- Kingdom: Animalia
- Phylum: Arthropoda
- Clade: Pancrustacea
- Class: Insecta
- Order: Lepidoptera
- Superfamily: Noctuoidea
- Family: Erebidae
- Subfamily: Arctiinae
- Genus: Eilema
- Species: E. alluaudi

Binomial name
- Eilema alluaudi Toulgoët, 1968

Species of moth

Eilema alluaudi is a moth of the subfamily Arctiinae first described by Hervé de Toulgoët in 1968. It is found in Madagascar.
