= Eilema birketsmithi =

Scientific classification
- Kingdom: Animalia
- Phylum: Arthropoda
- Class: Insecta
- Order: Lepidoptera
- Superfamily: Noctuoidea
- Family: Erebidae
- Subfamily: Arctiinae
- Genus: Eilema
- Species: E. birketsmithi

Binomial name
- Eilema birketsmithi Toulgoët, 1977

Synonyms
- Brunia birketsmithi (Toulgoët, 1977)

Species of moth

Eilema birketsmithi is a moth of the subfamily Arctiinae first described by Hervé de Toulgoët in 1977. It is found in Ethiopia.
