= Eilema barbata =

Scientific classification
- Kingdom: Animalia
- Phylum: Arthropoda
- Class: Insecta
- Order: Lepidoptera
- Superfamily: Noctuoidea
- Family: Erebidae
- Subfamily: Arctiinae
- Genus: Eilema
- Species: E. barbata

Binomial name
- Eilema barbata (Hampson, 1907)

Synonyms
- Ilema barbata Hampson, 1907

Species of moth

Eilema barbata is a moth of the subfamily Arctiinae. It is found in the Philippines.
