= Eilema marguerita =

Scientific classification
- Domain: Eukaryota
- Kingdom: Animalia
- Phylum: Arthropoda
- Class: Insecta
- Order: Lepidoptera
- Superfamily: Noctuoidea
- Family: Erebidae
- Subfamily: Arctiinae
- Genus: Eilema
- Species: E. marguerita

Binomial name
- Eilema marguerita (van Eecke, 1927)

Synonyms
- Ilema marguerita van Eecke, 1927

Species of moth

Eilema marguerita is a moth of the subfamily Arctiinae. It is found on Sumatra.
