= Eilema lamprocraspis =

Scientific classification
- Kingdom: Animalia
- Phylum: Arthropoda
- Class: Insecta
- Order: Lepidoptera
- Superfamily: Noctuoidea
- Family: Erebidae
- Subfamily: Arctiinae
- Genus: Eilema
- Species: E. lamprocraspis

Binomial name
- Eilema lamprocraspis (Hampson, 1914)

Synonyms
- Ilema lamprocraspes Hampson, 1914

Species of moth

Eilema lamprocraspis is a moth of the subfamily Arctiinae. It was described by George Hampson in 1914. It is found in the Seychelles.
