= Eilema inducta =

Scientific classification
- Kingdom: Animalia
- Phylum: Arthropoda
- Class: Insecta
- Order: Lepidoptera
- Superfamily: Noctuoidea
- Family: Erebidae
- Subfamily: Arctiinae
- Genus: Eilema
- Species: E. inducta

Binomial name
- Eilema inducta (Walker, [1865])

Synonyms
- Lithosia inducta Walker, [1865]

Species of moth

Eilema inducta is a moth of the subfamily Arctiinae first described by Francis Walker in 1865. It is found in the Nilgiri Mountains of India.
