= Eilema homochroma =

Scientific classification
- Kingdom: Animalia
- Phylum: Arthropoda
- Class: Insecta
- Order: Lepidoptera
- Superfamily: Noctuoidea
- Family: Erebidae
- Subfamily: Arctiinae
- Genus: Eilema
- Species: E. homochroma

Binomial name
- Eilema homochroma Toulgoët, 1957

Species of moth

Eilema homochroma is a moth of the subfamily Arctiinae first described by Hervé de Toulgoët in 1957. It is found on Madagascar.

== Subspecies ==
- Eilema homochroma homochroma
- Eilema homochroma ambrensis Toulgoët, 1971
