= Eilema lemur =

Scientific classification
- Kingdom: Animalia
- Phylum: Arthropoda
- Class: Insecta
- Order: Lepidoptera
- Superfamily: Noctuoidea
- Family: Erebidae
- Subfamily: Arctiinae
- Genus: Eilema
- Species: E. lemur

Binomial name
- Eilema lemur Toulgoët, 1954

Synonyms
- Eilema tortrix Toulgoët, 1954

Species of moth

Eilema lemur is a moth of the subfamily Arctiinae found on Madagascar. It was described by Hervé de Toulgoët in 1954.
