= Eilema sabulosula =

Scientific classification
- Kingdom: Animalia
- Phylum: Arthropoda
- Class: Insecta
- Order: Lepidoptera
- Superfamily: Noctuoidea
- Family: Erebidae
- Subfamily: Arctiinae
- Genus: Eilema
- Species: E. sabulosula

Binomial name
- Eilema sabulosula Toulgoët, 1954

Species of moth

Eilema sabulosula is a moth of the subfamily Arctiinae. It was described by Hervé de Toulgoët in 1954. It is found on the island of Madagascar.
