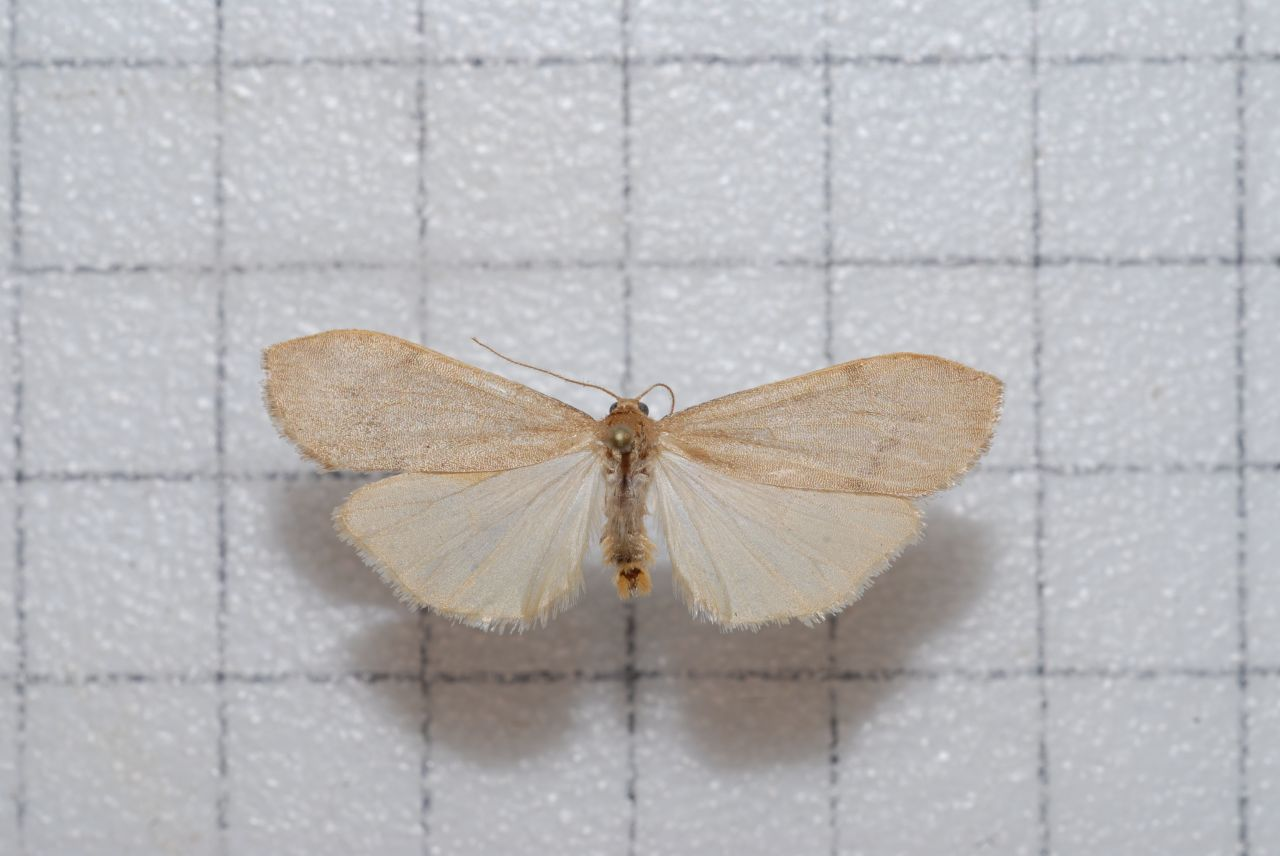

Scientific classification
- Kingdom: Animalia
- Phylum: Arthropoda
- Class: Insecta
- Order: Lepidoptera
- Superfamily: Noctuoidea
- Family: Erebidae
- Subfamily: Arctiinae
- Genus: Eilema
- Species: E. rubrescens

Binomial name
- Eilema rubrescens (Hampson, 1909)

Synonyms
- Ilema rubrescens Hampson, 1909

= Eilema rubrescens =

Species of moth

Eilema rubrescens is a moth in the subfamily Arctiinae first described by George Hampson in 1909. It is found in Taiwan.
