= Eilema fasciata =

Scientific classification
- Domain: Eukaryota
- Kingdom: Animalia
- Phylum: Arthropoda
- Class: Insecta
- Order: Lepidoptera
- Superfamily: Noctuoidea
- Family: Erebidae
- Subfamily: Arctiinae
- Genus: Eilema
- Species: E. fasciata

Binomial name
- Eilema fasciata (Moore, 1878)

Species of moth

Eilema fasciata is a moth of the subfamily Arctiinae. It was described by Frederic Moore in 1878. It is found in Sri Lanka.
