= Eilema pallidicosta =

Scientific classification
- Domain: Eukaryota
- Kingdom: Animalia
- Phylum: Arthropoda
- Class: Insecta
- Order: Lepidoptera
- Superfamily: Noctuoidea
- Family: Erebidae
- Subfamily: Arctiinae
- Genus: Eilema
- Species: E. pallidicosta

Binomial name
- Eilema pallidicosta (Mabille, 1900)

Synonyms
- Lithosia pallidicosta Mabille, 1900; Eilema humilis Kenrick, 1914

Species of moth

Eilema pallidicosta is a moth of the subfamily Arctiinae. It was described by Paul Mabille in 1900. It is found on Madagascar.
