= Eilema pustulata =

Scientific classification
- Kingdom: Animalia
- Phylum: Arthropoda
- Class: Insecta
- Order: Lepidoptera
- Superfamily: Noctuoidea
- Family: Erebidae
- Subfamily: Arctiinae
- Genus: Eilema
- Species: E. pustulata

Binomial name
- Eilema pustulata Wallengren, 1860

Species of moth

Eilema pustulata is a moth of the subfamily Arctiinae. It was described by Wallengren in 1860. It is found in South Africa.
