= List of moths of South Africa (Arctiinae) =

This is a list of moths of the subfamily Arctiinae that are found in South Africa. It also acts as an index to the species articles and forms part of the full List of moths of South Africa.

- Acantharctia latifasciata Hampson, 1909
- Acantharctia vittata Aurivillius, 1900
- Afrasura ichorina (Butler, 1877)
- Afrasura obliterata (Walker, 1864)
- Afrasura rivulosa (Walker, 1854)
- Afrospilarctia dissimilis (Distant, 1897)
- Afrospilarctia flavida (Bartel, 1903)
- Aglossosia flavimarginata Hampson, 1900
- Alpenus auriculatus Watson, 1988
- Alpenus maculosa (Stoll, 1781)
- Alpenus nigropunctata (Bethune-Baker, 1908)
- Alpenus whalleyi Watson, 1988
- Amata alicia (Butler, 1876)
- Amata atricornis (Wallengren, 1863)
- Amata cerbera (Linnaeus, 1764)
- Amata cuprizonata (Hampson, 1901)
- Amata endocrocis (Hampson, 1903)
- Amata johanna (Butler, 1876)
- Amata kuhlweini (Lefèbvre, 1832)
- Amata polidamon (Cramer, 1779)
- Amata rendalli (Distant, 1897)
- Amata simplex (Walker, 1854)
- Amerila affinis (Rothschild, 1910)
- Amerila bauri Möschler, 1884
- Amerila bipartita (Rothschild, 1910)
- Amerila lupia (Druce, 1887)
- Amerila madagascariensis (Boisduval, 1847)
- Amerila magnifica (Rothschild, 1910)
- Amerila phaedra Weymer, 1892
- Amerila vitrea Plötz, 1880
- Amphicallia bellatrix (Dalman, 1823)
- Amsacta melanogastra (Holland, 1897)
- Amsacta nivea Hampson, 1916
- Anaphosia aurantiaca Hampson, 1909
- Apisa canescens Walker, 1855
- Archilema uelleburgensis (Strand, 1912)
- Argina amanda (Boisduval, 1847)
- Argina astrea (Drury, 1773)
- Argina leonina (Walker, 1865)
- Asparus bicolor (Walker, 1855)
- Asura doa Kühne, 2007
- Asura sagenaria (Wallengren, 1860)
- Asura thumataeformis Strand, 1912
- Automolis bicolora (Walker, 1856)
- Automolis crassa (Felder, 1874)
- Automolis incensa (Walker, 1864)
- Automolis meteus (Stoll, 1781)
- Automolis pallida (Hampson, 1901)
- Binna penicillata Walker, 1865
- Binna scita (Walker, 1865)
- Cacosoma gnatula (Boisduval, 1847)
- Carcinopodia argentata (Distant, 1897)
- Caryatis hersilia Druce, 1887
- Ceryx anthraciformis (Wallengren, 1860)
- Ceryx longipes (Herrich-Schäffer, 1855)
- Ceryx resecta (Herrich-Schäffer, 1855)
- Ceryx toxotes Hampson, 1898
- Coscinia aethiopica Kühne, 2010
- Cragia distigmata (Hampson, 1901)
- Cragia quadrinotata (Walker, 1864)
- Creatonotos punctivitta (Walker, 1854)
- Ctenosia psectriphora (Distant, 1899)
- Cyana capensis (Hampson, 1903)
- Cyana marshalli (Hampson, 1900)
- Cyana pretoriae (Distant, 1897)
- Cyana rejecta (Walker, 1854)
- Cyana rhodostriata (Hampson, 1914)
- Cymaroa grisea (Thunberg, 1784)
- Dasyarctia grisea Gaede, 1923
- Didymonyx infumata (Hampson, 1900)
- Dionychoscelis venata Aurivillius, 1922
- Diota rostrata (Wallengren, 1860)
- Eilema achrosis Hampson, 1918
- Eilema albostriatum Kühne, 2010
- Eilema bifasciata Hampson, 1900
- Eilema brunneotincta Rothschild, 1912
- Eilema caffrana Strand, 1912
- Eilema colon Möschler, 1872
- Eilema creatoplaga (Hampson, 1901)
- Eilema discifera (Hampson, 1900)
- Eilema elegans (Butler, 1877)
- Eilema flavibasis Hampson, 1900
- Eilema gainsfordi Kühne, 2010
- Eilema goniophora Hampson, 1900
- Eilema gracilipennis (Wallengren, 1860)
- Eilema leia (Hampson, 1901)
- Eilema minutissima Bethune-Baker, 1911
- Eilema monochroma (Holland, 1893)
- Eilema phaeopera Hampson, 1900
- Eilema pustulata Wallengren, 1860
- Eilema sarceola Hampson, 1900
- Eilema trichopteroides Kühne, 2010
- Eilema vicara Strand, 1922
- Eilema virgineola Hampson, 1900
- Epitoxis amazoula (Boisduval, 1847)
- Epitoxis nigra Hampson, 1903
- Estigmene angustipennis (Walker, 1855)
- Estigmene internigralis Hampson, 1905
- Estigmene multivittata Rothschild, 1910
- Estigmene trivitta (Walker, 1855)
- Euchromia amoena (Möschler, 1872)
- Euchromia folletii (Guérin-Méneville, 1832)
- Euchromia lethe (Fabricius, 1775)
- Euchromia madagascariensis (Boisduval, 1833)
- Eucreagra arculifera Felder, 1874
- Eugoa africana Hampson, 1900
- Eurosia fuliginea Hampson, 1903
- Eurosia lineata Hampson, 1900
- Eurozonosia inconstans (Butler, 1896)
- Eutomis minceus (Stoll, 1781)
- Exilisia bipuncta (Hampson, 1900)
- Eyralpenus diplosticta (Hampson, 1900)
- Eyralpenus meinhofi (Bartel, 1903)
- Eyralpenus sublutea (Bartel, 1903)
- Eyralpenus testacea (Walker, 1855)
- Galtara doriae (Oberthür, 1880)
- Galtara doriae (Oberthür, 1880)
- Galtara nepheloptera (Hampson, 1910)
- Galtara pulverata (Hampson, 1900)
- Galtara purata Walker, 1863
- Hypagoptera rufeola Hampson, 1900
- Ilemodes astriga Hampson, 1916
- Ilemodes heterogyna Hampson, 1900
- Karschiola holoclera (Karsch, 1894)
- Lamprosiella eborella (Boisduval, 1847)
- Lepista aposema Kühne, 2010
- Lepista pandula (Boisduval, 1847)
- Lepista semiochracea (Felder, 1874)
- Leucaloa eugraphica (Walker, 1865)
- Logunovium scortillum Wallengren, 1875
- Lysceia bigutta Walker, 1854
- Macrosia chalybeata Hampson, 1901
- Macrosia fumeola (Walker, 1854)
- Metarctia benitensis Holland, 1893
- Metarctia brunneipennis Hering, 1932
- Metarctia burra (Schaus & Clements, 1893)
- Metarctia cinnamomea (Wallengren, 1860)
- Metarctia confederationis Kiriakoff, 1961
- Metarctia dracoena (Kiriakoff, 1953)
- Metarctia jansei (Kiriakoff, 1957)
- Metarctia lateritia Herrich-Schäffer, 1855
- Metarctia lindemannae Kiriakoff, 1961
- Metarctia paremphares Holland, 1893
- Metarctia rubra (Walker, 1856)
- Metarctia rufescens Walker, 1855
- Metarctia saalfeldi Kiriakoff, 1960
- Metarctia transvaalica (Kiriakoff, 1973)
- Micralarctia punctulatum (Wallengren, 1860)
- Micrilema craushayi Hampson, 1903
- Neuroxena obscurascens (Strand, 1909)
- Nyctemera apicalis (Walker, 1854)
- Nyctemera leuconoe Hopffer, 1857
- Ochrota bipuncta (Hampson, 1900)
- Ochrota unicolor (Hopffer, 1857)
- Opsaroa fulvinota Hampson, 1905
- Ovenna simulans (Mabille, 1878)
- Ovenna subgriseola (Strand, 1912)
- Ovenna vicaria (Walker, 1854)
- Paralacydes arborifera (Butler, 1875)
- Paralacydes bomfordi (Pinhey, 1968)
- Paralacydes jeskei (Grünberg, 1911)
- Paralacydes ramosa (Hampson, 1907)
- Paralacydes vocula (Stoll, 1790)
- Paralpenus strigulosa (Hampson, 1901)
- Paramaenas affinis (Rothschild, 1933)
- Paramaenas nephelistis (Hampson, 1907)
- Paramaenas strigosus Grünberg, 1911
- Paraona interjecta Strand, 1912
- Pareuchaetes aurata (Butler, 1875)
- Pareuchaetes pseudoinsulata Rego Barros, 1956
- Pasteosia irrorata Hampson, 1900
- Pasteosia plumbea Hampson, 1900
- Paurophleps minuta Hampson, 1900
- Phlyctaenogastra rangei Gaede, 1915
- Phragmatobia parvula (Felder, 1874)
- Phryganopsis asperatella (Walker, 1864)
- Phryganopsis atrescens Hampson, 1903
- Phryganopsis cinerella (Wallengren, 1860)
- Phryganopsis continentalis Kühne, 2010
- Phryganopsis gilvapatagia Kühne, 2010
- Phryganopsis interstiteola Hampson, 1914
- Phryganopsis plumosa Mabille, 1900
- Phryganopsis punctilineata (Hampson, 1901)
- Phryganopsis sordida Felder, 1874
- Phryganopsis subasperatella Strand, 1912
- Phryganopsis tenuisparsa Kühne, 2010
- Popoudina dorsalis (Walker, 1855)
- Popoudina griseipennis (Bartel, 1903)
- Popoudina lemniscata (Distant, 1898)
- Popoudina linea (Walker, 1855)
- Pseudonaclia puella (Boisduval, 1847)
- Pusiola flavicosta (Wallengren, 1860)
- Pusiola verulama (Strand, 1912)
- Radiarctia lutescens (Walker, 1854)
- Radiarctia rhodesiana (Hampson, 1900)
- Rhodogastria amasis (Cramer, 1779)
- Rhodogastria similis (Möschler, 1884)
- Saenura flava Wallengren, 1860
- Secusio deilemera Talbot, 1929
- Secusio discoidalis Talbot, 1929
- Secusio strigata Walker, 1854
- Setina atroradiata Walker, 1865
- Seydelia ellioti (Butler, 1895)
- Siccia atriguttata Hampson, 1909
- Siccia caffra Walker, 1854
- Siccia melanospila Hampson, 1911
- Siccia punctipennis (Wallengren, 1860)
- Siccia pustulata (Wallengren, 1860)
- Sozusa despecta (Walker, 1862)
- Sozusa heterocera Walker, 1865
- Sozusa montana Kühne, 2010
- Sozusa scutellata (Wallengren, 1860)
- Sozusa triangulata Kühne, 2010
- Spilosoma bipartita Rothschild, 1933
- Spilosoma butti (Rothschild, 1910)
- Spilosoma chionea (Hampson, 1900)
- Spilosoma euryphlebia (Hampson, 1903)
- Spilosoma gynephaea (Hampson, 1901)
- Spilosoma immaculata Bartel, 1903
- Spilosoma latiradiata (Hampson, 1901)
- Spilosoma leighi (Rothschild, 1910)
- Spilosoma lentifasciata (Hampson, 1916)
- Spilosoma lineata Walker, 1855
- Teracotona euprepia Hampson, 1900
- Teracotona metaxantha Hampson, 1909
- Teracotona pardalina Bartel, 1903
- Teracotona rhodophaea (Walker, 1865)
- Teracotona submacula (Walker, 1855)
- Thumatha inconstans (Butler, 1897)
- Thyretes caffra Wallengren, 1863
- Thyretes hippotes (Cramer, 1780)
- Thyretes montana Boisduval, 1847
- Trichaeta fulvescens (Walker, 1854)
- Trichaeta pterophorina (Mabille, 1892)
- Utetheisa elata (Fabricius, 1798)
- Utetheisa lotrix (Cramer, 1779)
- Utetheisa pulchella (Linnaeus, 1758)
- Zadadrina metallica Kiriakoff, 1954
- Zobida avifex Kühne, 2010
