= Archilema =

Scientific classification
- Domain: Eukaryota
- Kingdom: Animalia
- Phylum: Arthropoda
- Class: Insecta
- Order: Lepidoptera
- Superfamily: Noctuoidea
- Family: Erebidae
- Subfamily: Arctiinae
- Tribe: Lithosiini
- Genus: Archilema; Birket-Smith, 1965

Synonyms
- Palilema Birket-Smith, 1965

Genus of moths

Archilema is a genus of moths in the subfamily Arctiinae. The genus was erected by Sven Jorgen R. Birket-Smith in 1965.

== Species ==
- Archilema cinderella (Kiriakoff, 1958)
- Archilema dentata Kühne, 2007
- Archilema modiolus (Kiriakoff, 1958)
- Archilema nivea Kühne, 2007
- Archilema subumbrata (Holland, 1893)
- Archilema uelleburgensis (Strand, 1912)
- Archilema vilis Birket-Smith, 1965

== Former species ==
- Archilema achrosis
- Archilema lucens Durante & Panzera, 2002 is now a synonym of Pusiola poliosia (Kiriakoff, 1958)
