= Metarctia nigritarsis =

Scientific classification
- Kingdom: Animalia
- Phylum: Arthropoda
- Clade: Pancrustacea
- Class: Insecta
- Order: Lepidoptera
- Superfamily: Noctuoidea
- Family: Erebidae
- Subfamily: Arctiinae
- Genus: Metarctia
- Species: M. nigritarsis

Binomial name
- Metarctia nigritarsis Berio, 1941

Synonyms
- Metarctia pallida f. nigritarsis Berio, 1941

Species of moth

Metarctia nigritarsis is a moth of the subfamily Arctiinae. It was described by Emilio Berio in 1941 and is found in Eritrea.
