= Eurosia fuscipunctata =

Scientific classification
- Domain: Eukaryota
- Kingdom: Animalia
- Phylum: Arthropoda
- Class: Insecta
- Order: Lepidoptera
- Superfamily: Noctuoidea
- Family: Erebidae
- Subfamily: Arctiinae
- Genus: Eurosia
- Species: E. fuscipunctata

Binomial name
- Eurosia fuscipunctata Wileman, 1928

Species of moth

Eurosia fuscipunctata is a moth of the family Erebidae, found in the Philippines.
