= Eurozonosia atricincta =

Scientific classification
- Kingdom: Animalia
- Phylum: Arthropoda
- Class: Insecta
- Order: Lepidoptera
- Superfamily: Noctuoidea
- Family: Erebidae
- Subfamily: Arctiinae
- Genus: Eurozonosia
- Species: E. atricincta

Binomial name
- Eurozonosia atricincta Hampson, 1918

Species of moth

Eurozonosia atricincta is a moth of the subfamily Arctiinae. It was described by George Hampson in 1918. It is found in Kenya and Malawi.
