= Metarctia nigricornis =

Scientific classification
- Kingdom: Animalia
- Phylum: Arthropoda
- Clade: Pancrustacea
- Class: Insecta
- Order: Lepidoptera
- Superfamily: Noctuoidea
- Family: Erebidae
- Subfamily: Arctiinae
- Genus: Metarctia
- Species: M. nigricornis

Binomial name
- Metarctia nigricornis Debauche, 1942

Synonyms
- Metarctia haematosphages nigricornis Debauche, 1942

Species of moth

Metarctia nigricornis is a moth of the subfamily Arctiinae. It was described by Hubert Robert Debauche in 1942. It is found in the Democratic Republic of the Congo.
