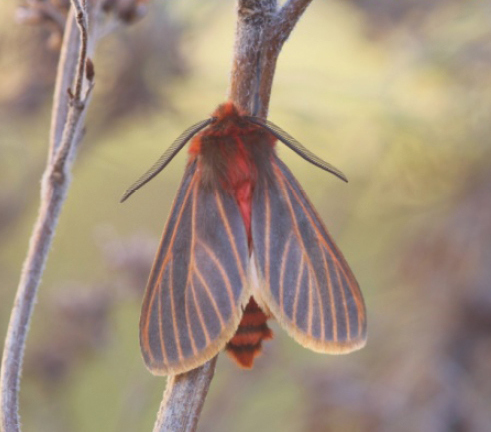

Scientific classification
- Kingdom: Animalia
- Phylum: Arthropoda
- Clade: Pancrustacea
- Class: Insecta
- Order: Lepidoptera
- Superfamily: Noctuoidea
- Family: Erebidae
- Subfamily: Arctiinae
- Genus: Metarctia
- Species: M. flavivena

Binomial name
- Metarctia flavivena Hampson, 1901

Synonyms
- Metarctia flavivena Hampson, 1902; Metarctia panyamana Strand, 1920; Metarctia rothschildi Le Cerf, 1922; Metarctia zegina Strand, 1920

= Metarctia flavivena =

Species of moth

Metarctia flavivena is a moth of the subfamily Arctiinae. It was described by George Hampson in 1901. It is found in Angola, the Democratic Republic of the Congo, Ethiopia, Kenya, Mozambique, Nigeria, Rwanda, Uganda and Zimbabwe.
