= Metarctia alticola =

Scientific classification
- Kingdom: Animalia
- Phylum: Arthropoda
- Clade: Pancrustacea
- Class: Insecta
- Order: Lepidoptera
- Superfamily: Noctuoidea
- Family: Erebidae
- Subfamily: Arctiinae
- Genus: Metarctia
- Species: M. alticola

Binomial name
- Metarctia alticola Aurivillius, 1925

Synonyms
- Metarctia rhodites Kiriakoff, 1957

Species of moth

Metarctia alticola is a moth of the subfamily Arctiinae. It was described by Per Olof Christopher Aurivillius in 1925 and is found in the Democratic Republic of the Congo and Rwanda.
