= Metarctia fulvia =

Scientific classification
- Kingdom: Animalia
- Phylum: Arthropoda
- Clade: Pancrustacea
- Class: Insecta
- Order: Lepidoptera
- Superfamily: Noctuoidea
- Family: Erebidae
- Subfamily: Arctiinae
- Genus: Metarctia
- Species: M. fulvia

Binomial name
- Metarctia fulvia Hampson, 1901

Synonyms
- Metarctia neaera Fawcett, 1915

Species of moth

Metarctia fulvia is a moth of the subfamily Arctiinae. It was described by George Hampson in 1901. It is found in Ethiopia, Kenya, Tanzania and Uganda.
