= Eurosia substrigillata =

Scientific classification
- Domain: Eukaryota
- Kingdom: Animalia
- Phylum: Arthropoda
- Class: Insecta
- Order: Lepidoptera
- Superfamily: Noctuoidea
- Family: Erebidae
- Subfamily: Arctiinae
- Genus: Eurosia
- Species: E. substrigillata

Binomial name
- Eurosia substrigillata (Rothschild, 1912)

Synonyms
- Lambula substrigillata Rothschild, 1912

Species of moth

Eurosia substrigillata is a moth of the family Erebidae first described by Walter Rothschild in 1912. It is found in Papua New Guinea.
