= Metarctia noctis =

Scientific classification
- Kingdom: Animalia
- Phylum: Arthropoda
- Clade: Pancrustacea
- Class: Insecta
- Order: Lepidoptera
- Superfamily: Noctuoidea
- Family: Erebidae
- Subfamily: Arctiinae
- Genus: Metarctia
- Species: M. noctis

Binomial name
- Metarctia noctis H. Druce, 1910

Synonyms
- Automolis noctis

Species of moth

Metarctia noctis is a moth of the subfamily Arctiinae. It was described by Herbert Druce in 1910. It is found in Ethiopia.
