= Metarctia haematricha =

Scientific classification
- Kingdom: Animalia
- Phylum: Arthropoda
- Clade: Pancrustacea
- Class: Insecta
- Order: Lepidoptera
- Superfamily: Noctuoidea
- Family: Erebidae
- Subfamily: Arctiinae
- Genus: Metarctia
- Species: M. haematricha

Binomial name
- Metarctia haematricha Hampson, 1905

Synonyms
- Metarctia latipennis Kiriakoff, 1957

Species of moth

Metarctia haematricha is a moth of the subfamily Arctiinae. It was described by George Hampson in 1905. It is found in Eritrea, Ethiopia and Kenya.
