= Metarctia uniformis =

Scientific classification
- Kingdom: Animalia
- Phylum: Arthropoda
- Clade: Pancrustacea
- Class: Insecta
- Order: Lepidoptera
- Superfamily: Noctuoidea
- Family: Erebidae
- Subfamily: Arctiinae
- Genus: Metarctia
- Species: M. uniformis

Binomial name
- Metarctia uniformis Bethune-Baker, 1911

Species of moth

Metarctia uniformis is a moth of the subfamily Arctiinae. It was described by George Thomas Bethune-Baker in 1911. It is found in Angola, Kenya and Tanzania.
