= Metarctia phaeoptera =

Scientific classification
- Kingdom: Animalia
- Phylum: Arthropoda
- Clade: Pancrustacea
- Class: Insecta
- Order: Lepidoptera
- Superfamily: Noctuoidea
- Family: Erebidae
- Subfamily: Arctiinae
- Genus: Metarctia
- Species: M. phaeoptera

Binomial name
- Metarctia phaeoptera Hampson, 1909

Synonyms
- Metarctia helga Kiriakoff, 1957; Metarctia tricolor Rougeot, 1977; Metarctia xanthippa Kiriakoff, 1956

Species of moth

Metarctia phaeoptera is a moth of the subfamily Arctiinae. It was described by George Hampson in 1909. It is found in the Democratic Republic of the Congo, Kenya, Tanzania and Uganda.
