= Archilema nivea =

Scientific classification
- Domain: Eukaryota
- Kingdom: Animalia
- Phylum: Arthropoda
- Class: Insecta
- Order: Lepidoptera
- Superfamily: Noctuoidea
- Family: Erebidae
- Subfamily: Arctiinae
- Genus: Archilema
- Species: A. nivea

Binomial name
- Archilema nivea Kühne, 2007

Synonyms
- Poecililema nivea (Kühne, 2007)

Species of moth

Archilema nivea is a moth of the subfamily Arctiinae. It was described by Lars Kühne in 2007. It is found in Kenya.
