= Cragia =

Scientific classification
- Domain: Eukaryota
- Kingdom: Animalia
- Phylum: Arthropoda
- Class: Insecta
- Order: Lepidoptera
- Superfamily: Noctuoidea
- Family: Erebidae
- Subfamily: Arctiinae
- Tribe: Lithosiini
- Genus: Cragia; Birket-Smith, 1965

Genus of moths

Cragia is a genus of moths in the subfamily Arctiinae.

== Species ==
- Cragia adiastola Kiriakoff, 1958
- Cragia distigmata (Hampson, 1901)
- Cragia quadrinotata (Walker, 1864)
