= Archilema cinderella =

Scientific classification
- Kingdom: Animalia
- Phylum: Arthropoda
- Class: Insecta
- Order: Lepidoptera
- Superfamily: Noctuoidea
- Family: Erebidae
- Subfamily: Arctiinae
- Genus: Archilema
- Species: A. cinderella

Binomial name
- Archilema cinderella (Kiriakoff, 1958)

Synonyms
- Eilema cinderella Kiriakoff, 1958

Species of moth

Archilema cinderella is a moth of the subfamily Arctiinae. It was described by Sergius G. Kiriakoff in 1958, originally under the genus Eilema. It is found in Uganda and Nigeria.
