= Metarctia hebenoides =

Scientific classification
- Kingdom: Animalia
- Phylum: Arthropoda
- Clade: Pancrustacea
- Class: Insecta
- Order: Lepidoptera
- Superfamily: Noctuoidea
- Family: Erebidae
- Subfamily: Arctiinae
- Genus: Metarctia
- Species: M. hebenoides

Binomial name
- Metarctia hebenoides (Kiriakoff, 1973)

Synonyms
- Automolis hebenoides Kiriakoff, 1973

Species of moth

Metarctia hebenoides is a moth of the subfamily Arctiinae. It was described by Sergius G. Kiriakoff in 1973. It is found in Malawi.
