= Eurosia costinota =

Scientific classification
- Domain: Eukaryota
- Kingdom: Animalia
- Phylum: Arthropoda
- Class: Insecta
- Order: Lepidoptera
- Superfamily: Noctuoidea
- Family: Erebidae
- Subfamily: Arctiinae
- Genus: Eurosia
- Species: E. costinota

Binomial name
- Eurosia costinota Wileman

Species of moth

Eurosia costinota is a moth of the family Erebidae first described by Alfred Ernest Wileman. It is found on Mindanao in the Philippines.
