= Metarctia burungae =

Scientific classification
- Kingdom: Animalia
- Phylum: Arthropoda
- Clade: Pancrustacea
- Class: Insecta
- Order: Lepidoptera
- Superfamily: Noctuoidea
- Family: Erebidae
- Subfamily: Arctiinae
- Genus: Metarctia
- Species: M. burungae

Binomial name
- Metarctia burungae Debauche, 1942

Synonyms
- Metarctia umbretta Kiriakoff, 1963

Species of moth

Metarctia burungae is a moth of the subfamily Arctiinae. It was described by Hubert Robert Debauche in 1942. It is found in the Democratic Republic of the Congo and Uganda.
