= Ctenosia nephelistis =

Scientific classification
- Kingdom: Animalia
- Phylum: Arthropoda
- Class: Insecta
- Order: Lepidoptera
- Superfamily: Noctuoidea
- Family: Erebidae
- Subfamily: Arctiinae
- Genus: Ctenosia
- Species: C. nephelistis

Binomial name
- Ctenosia nephelistis Hampson, 1918

Species of moth

Ctenosia nephelistis is a moth of the subfamily Arctiinae. It was described by George Hampson in 1918. It is found in Kenya and Malawi.
