= Archilema subumbrata =

Scientific classification
- Kingdom: Animalia
- Phylum: Arthropoda
- Class: Insecta
- Order: Lepidoptera
- Superfamily: Noctuoidea
- Family: Erebidae
- Subfamily: Arctiinae
- Genus: Archilema
- Species: A. subumbrata

Binomial name
- Archilema subumbrata (Holland, 1893)

Synonyms
- Lepista subumbrata Holland, 1893

Species of moth

Archilema subumbrata is a moth of the subfamily Arctiinae. It was described by William Jacob Holland in 1893, originally under the genus Lepista. It is found in Gabon and Nigeria.
