= Eurosia grisea =

Scientific classification
- Kingdom: Animalia
- Phylum: Arthropoda
- Class: Insecta
- Order: Lepidoptera
- Superfamily: Noctuoidea
- Family: Erebidae
- Subfamily: Arctiinae
- Genus: Eurosia
- Species: E. grisea

Binomial name
- Eurosia grisea (Hampson, 1893)

Synonyms
- Narasodes grisea Hampson, 1893

Species of moth

Eurosia grisea is a moth of the family Erebidae first described by George Hampson in 1893. It is found in Sri Lanka.

== Description ==
Forewings broad and apex rounded. Male has silvery body. Forewings with an indistinct nearly straight erect medial line. A prominent black speck can be found at end of cell. An indistinct postmedial line excurved round end of cell. Three black specks found on the margin below the apex and one speck at outer angle.
