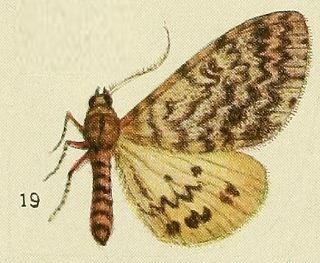
- Paramaenas nephelistis hecate

Scientific classification
- Domain: Eukaryota
- Kingdom: Animalia
- Phylum: Arthropoda
- Class: Insecta
- Order: Lepidoptera
- Superfamily: Noctuoidea
- Family: Erebidae
- Subfamily: Arctiinae
- Subtribe: Spilosomina
- Genus: Paramaenas; Grünberg, 1911

Type species
- Paramaenas strigosus Grünberg, 1911

= Paramaenas =

Genus of moths

Paramaenas is a genus of moths in the family Erebidae from the Afrotropics. The genus was erected by Karl Grünberg in 1911.

== Species ==
- Paramaenas affinis (Rothschild, 1933)
- Paramaenas nephelistis (Hampson, 1907)
  - Paramaenas nephelistis diaphana (Rothschild, 1933)
  - Paramaenas nephelistis hecate (Fawcett, 1916)
- Paramaenas strigosus Grünberg, 1911
