= Macrosia =

Scientific classification
- Kingdom: Animalia
- Phylum: Arthropoda
- Class: Insecta
- Order: Lepidoptera
- Superfamily: Noctuoidea
- Family: Erebidae
- Subfamily: Arctiinae
- Tribe: Lithosiini
- Genus: Macrosia; Hampson, 1900

Genus of moths

Macrosia is a genus of moths in the subfamily Arctiinae. The genus was erected by George Hampson in 1900.

== Species ==
- Macrosia chalybeata Hampson, 1901
- Macrosia fumeola Walker, 1854

== Former species ==
- Macrosia wiltshirei Tams, 1939
