= Eurosia melanopera =

Scientific classification
- Kingdom: Animalia
- Phylum: Arthropoda
- Class: Insecta
- Order: Lepidoptera
- Superfamily: Noctuoidea
- Family: Erebidae
- Subfamily: Arctiinae
- Genus: Eurosia
- Species: E. melanopera

Binomial name
- Eurosia melanopera Hampson, 1900

Species of moth

Eurosia melanopera is a moth of the family Erebidae first described by George Hampson in 1900. It is found on Borneo.
