= Metarctia tenebrosa =

Scientific classification
- Kingdom: Animalia
- Phylum: Arthropoda
- Clade: Pancrustacea
- Class: Insecta
- Order: Lepidoptera
- Superfamily: Noctuoidea
- Family: Erebidae
- Subfamily: Arctiinae
- Genus: Metarctia
- Species: M. tenebrosa

Binomial name
- Metarctia tenebrosa (Le Cerf, 1922)

Synonyms
- Collocaliodes margaretha Le Cerf, 1922

Species of moth

Metarctia tenebrosa is a moth of the subfamily Arctiinae. It was described by Ferdinand Le Cerf in 1922. It is found in Ethiopia, Kenya and Tanzania.
