= Ctenosia =

Scientific classification
- Kingdom: Animalia
- Phylum: Arthropoda
- Class: Insecta
- Order: Lepidoptera
- Superfamily: Noctuoidea
- Family: Erebidae
- Subfamily: Arctiinae
- Tribe: Lithosiini
- Genus: Ctenosia; Hampson, 1900

Genus of moths

Ctenosia is a genus of moths in the subfamily Arctiinae. The genus was erected by George Hampson in 1900.

== Species ==
- Ctenosia albiceps Hampson, 1901
- Ctenosia infuscata Lower, 1902
- Ctenosia inornata Wileman
- Ctenosia nephelistis Hampson, 1918
- Ctenosia psectriphora Distant, 1899
