= Metarctia forsteri =

Scientific classification
- Kingdom: Animalia
- Phylum: Arthropoda
- Clade: Pancrustacea
- Class: Insecta
- Order: Lepidoptera
- Superfamily: Noctuoidea
- Family: Erebidae
- Subfamily: Arctiinae
- Genus: Metarctia
- Species: M. forsteri

Binomial name
- Metarctia forsteri Kiriakoff, 1955

Species of moth

Metarctia forsteri is a moth of the subfamily Arctiinae. It was described by Sergius G. Kiriakoff in 1955. It is found in Cameroon, the Democratic Republic of the Congo and Rwanda.
