= Eurosia punctitermia =

Scientific classification
- Kingdom: Animalia
- Phylum: Arthropoda
- Class: Insecta
- Order: Lepidoptera
- Superfamily: Noctuoidea
- Family: Erebidae
- Subfamily: Arctiinae
- Genus: Eurosia
- Species: E. punctitermia

Binomial name
- Eurosia punctitermia Hampson, 1900

Species of moth

Eurosia punctitermia is a moth of the family Erebidae. It was described by George Hampson in 1900. It is found on Bali.
