= Metarctia sarcosoma =

Scientific classification
- Kingdom: Animalia
- Phylum: Arthropoda
- Clade: Pancrustacea
- Class: Insecta
- Order: Lepidoptera
- Superfamily: Noctuoidea
- Family: Erebidae
- Subfamily: Arctiinae
- Genus: Metarctia
- Species: M. sarcosoma

Binomial name
- Metarctia sarcosoma Hampson, 1901

Species of moth

Metarctia sarcosoma is a moth of the subfamily Arctiinae. It was described by George Hampson in 1901. It is found in Kenya and Uganda.
