= Ctenosia infuscata =

Scientific classification
- Domain: Eukaryota
- Kingdom: Animalia
- Phylum: Arthropoda
- Class: Insecta
- Order: Lepidoptera
- Superfamily: Noctuoidea
- Family: Erebidae
- Subfamily: Arctiinae
- Genus: Ctenosia
- Species: C. infuscata

Binomial name
- Ctenosia infuscata Lower, 1902

Species of moth

Ctenosia infuscata is a moth of the subfamily Arctiinae. It was described by Oswald Bertram Lower in 1902. It is found in Australia.
