= Metarctia lugubris =

Scientific classification
- Kingdom: Animalia
- Phylum: Arthropoda
- Clade: Pancrustacea
- Class: Insecta
- Order: Lepidoptera
- Superfamily: Noctuoidea
- Family: Erebidae
- Subfamily: Arctiinae
- Genus: Metarctia
- Species: M. lugubris

Binomial name
- Metarctia lugubris Gaede, 1926

Synonyms
- Metarctia fletcheri Kiriakoff, 1958; Metarctia usta Debauche, 1942

Species of moth

Metarctia lugubris is a moth of the subfamily Arctiinae. It was described by Max Gaede in 1926. It is found in the Democratic Republic of the Congo and Uganda.
