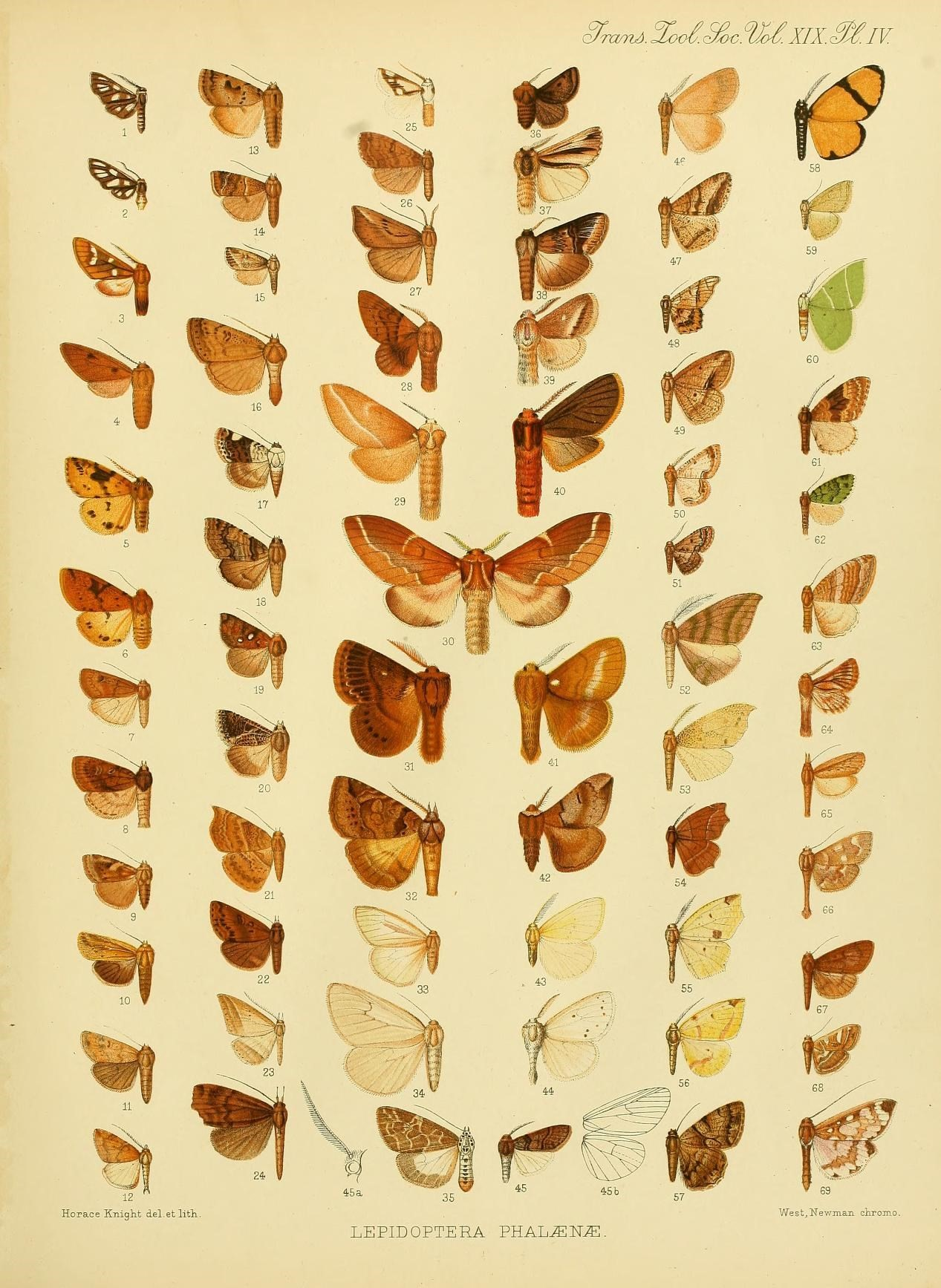
- Fig 4, Female

Scientific classification
- Kingdom: Animalia
- Phylum: Arthropoda
- Clade: Pancrustacea
- Class: Insecta
- Order: Lepidoptera
- Superfamily: Noctuoidea
- Family: Erebidae
- Subfamily: Arctiinae
- Genus: Metarctia
- Species: M. pulverea

Binomial name
- Metarctia pulverea Hampson, 1907

Synonyms
- Metarctia bipuncta Joicey & Talbot, 1924

= Metarctia pulverea =

Species of moth

Metarctia pulverea is a moth of the subfamily Arctiinae. It was described by George Hampson in 1907. It is found in the Democratic Republic of the Congo, Rwanda and Uganda.
