= Metarctia rubribasa =

Scientific classification
- Kingdom: Animalia
- Phylum: Arthropoda
- Clade: Pancrustacea
- Class: Insecta
- Order: Lepidoptera
- Superfamily: Noctuoidea
- Family: Erebidae
- Subfamily: Arctiinae
- Genus: Metarctia
- Species: M. rubribasa

Binomial name
- Metarctia rubribasa Bethune-Baker, 1911

Synonyms
- Metarctia deriemaeckeri Kiriakoff, 1953; Metarctia rubripuncta f. rubricosta Talbot, 1929

Species of moth

Metarctia rubribasa is a moth of the subfamily Arctiinae. It was described by George Thomas Bethune-Baker in 1911. It is found in Angola and the Democratic Republic of the Congo.
