= Metarctia flavicincta =

Scientific classification
- Kingdom: Animalia
- Phylum: Arthropoda
- Clade: Pancrustacea
- Class: Insecta
- Order: Lepidoptera
- Superfamily: Noctuoidea
- Family: Erebidae
- Subfamily: Arctiinae
- Genus: Metarctia
- Species: M. flavicincta

Binomial name
- Metarctia flavicincta Aurivillius, 1900

Synonyms
- Metarctia contrasta Bethune-Baker, 1911; Metarctia (Notharctia) dracuncula Kiriakoff, 1957; Metarctia jacksoni Kiriakoff, 1956; Metarctia moira Kiriakoff, 1957; Metarctia subpumila Kiriakoff, 1957

Species of moth

Metarctia flavicincta is a moth of the subfamily Arctiinae. It was described by Per Olof Christopher Aurivillius in 1900 and is found in Angola, Burundi, the Democratic Republic of the Congo, Ethiopia, Ghana, Kenya, Rwanda, Sudan, Tanzania and Uganda.
