= Eurozonosia fulvinigra =

Scientific classification
- Kingdom: Animalia
- Phylum: Arthropoda
- Class: Insecta
- Order: Lepidoptera
- Superfamily: Noctuoidea
- Family: Erebidae
- Subfamily: Arctiinae
- Genus: Eurozonosia
- Species: E. fulvinigra

Binomial name
- Eurozonosia fulvinigra Hampson, 1914

Species of moth

Eurozonosia fulvinigra is a moth of the subfamily Arctiinae. It was described by George Hampson in 1914. It is found in the Democratic Republic of the Congo, Kenya, Rwanda and Uganda.
