= Metarctia collocalia =

Scientific classification
- Kingdom: Animalia
- Phylum: Arthropoda
- Clade: Pancrustacea
- Class: Insecta
- Order: Lepidoptera
- Superfamily: Noctuoidea
- Family: Erebidae
- Subfamily: Arctiinae
- Genus: Metarctia
- Species: M. collocalia

Binomial name
- Metarctia collocalia Kiriakoff, 1957

Synonyms
- Collocaliodes collocalia

Species of moth

Metarctia collocalia is a moth belonging to the subfamily Arctiinae. It was described by Sergius G. Kiriakoff in 1957. It is found in the Democratic Republic of the Congo, Malawi, Tanzania and Zimbabwe.

== Subspecies ==
- Metarctia collocalia collocalia (Malawi, Zimbabwe)
- Metarctia collocalia montium Kiriakoff, 1957 (Democratic Republic of the Congo)
- Metarctia collocalia kilimaensis (Kiriakoff, 1957) (Tanzania)
