= Metarctia diversa =

Scientific classification
- Kingdom: Animalia
- Phylum: Arthropoda
- Clade: Pancrustacea
- Class: Insecta
- Order: Lepidoptera
- Superfamily: Noctuoidea
- Family: Erebidae
- Subfamily: Arctiinae
- Genus: Metarctia
- Species: M. diversa

Binomial name
- Metarctia diversa Bethune-Baker, 1911

Synonyms
- Metarctia pallidicosta Hulstaert, 1923

Species of moth

Metarctia diversa is a moth of the subfamily Arctiinae. It was described by George Thomas Bethune-Baker in 1911. It is found in the Democratic Republic of the Congo and Angola.
