= Metarctia upembae =

Scientific classification
- Kingdom: Animalia
- Phylum: Arthropoda
- Clade: Pancrustacea
- Class: Insecta
- Order: Lepidoptera
- Superfamily: Noctuoidea
- Family: Erebidae
- Subfamily: Arctiinae
- Genus: Metarctia
- Species: M. upembae

Binomial name
- Metarctia upembae Kiriakoff, 1949

Species of moth

Metarctia upembae is a moth of the subfamily Arctiinae. It was described by Sergius G. Kiriakoff in 1949. It is found in the Democratic Republic of the Congo and Tanzania.
