= Leucaloa nyasica =

Scientific classification
- Kingdom: Animalia
- Phylum: Arthropoda
- Class: Insecta
- Order: Lepidoptera
- Superfamily: Noctuoidea
- Family: Erebidae
- Subfamily: Arctiinae
- Genus: Leucaloa
- Species: L. nyasica

Binomial name
- Leucaloa nyasica (Hampson, 1911)

Synonyms
- Diacrisia nyasica Hampson, 1911; Diacrisia nyasica ab. zomba Strand, 1919

Species of moth

Leucaloa nyasica is a moth of the family Erebidae. It was described by George Hampson in 1911. It is found in Malawi and Zimbabwe.
