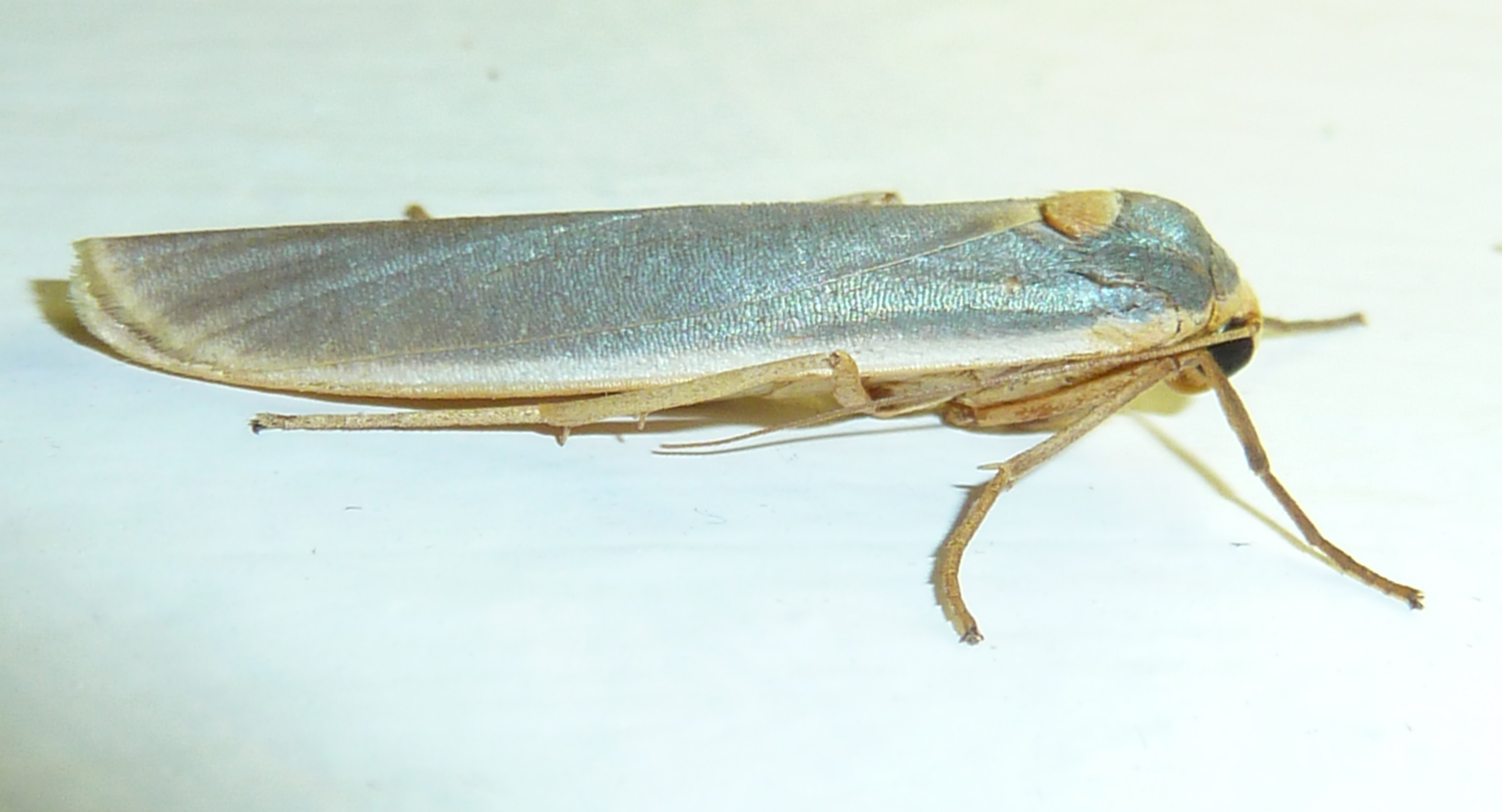
- Female Sozusa scutellata

Scientific classification
- Kingdom: Animalia
- Phylum: Arthropoda
- Class: Insecta
- Order: Lepidoptera
- Superfamily: Noctuoidea
- Family: Erebidae
- Subfamily: Arctiinae
- Tribe: Lithosiini
- Subtribe: Lithosiina
- Genus: Sozusa; Wallengren, 1863

Synonyms
- Sozuza Butler, 1878

= Sozusa (moth) =

Genus of moths

Sozusa is a genus of moths in the family Erebidae.

== Species ==
- Sozusa despecta Walker, 1862
- Sozusa heterocera Walker, 1864
- Sozusa montana Kühne, 2010
- Sozusa scutellata Wallengren, 1860
- Sozusa triangulata Kühne, 2010
