= Eurosia ludekingi =

Scientific classification
- Domain: Eukaryota
- Kingdom: Animalia
- Phylum: Arthropoda
- Class: Insecta
- Order: Lepidoptera
- Superfamily: Noctuoidea
- Family: Erebidae
- Subfamily: Arctiinae
- Genus: Eurosia
- Species: E. ludekingi

Binomial name
- Eurosia ludekingi van Eecke, 1920

Species of moths

Eurosia ludekingi is a moth of the family Erebidae. It is found on Java.
