= Metarctia insignis =

Scientific classification
- Kingdom: Animalia
- Phylum: Arthropoda
- Clade: Pancrustacea
- Class: Insecta
- Order: Lepidoptera
- Superfamily: Noctuoidea
- Family: Erebidae
- Subfamily: Arctiinae
- Genus: Metarctia
- Species: M. insignis

Binomial name
- Metarctia insignis Kiriakoff, 1959

Species of moth

Metarctia insignis is a moth of the subfamily Arctiinae. It was described by Sergius G. Kiriakoff in 1959. It is found in Rwanda and Tanzania.
