= Metarctia inconspicua =

Scientific classification
- Kingdom: Animalia
- Phylum: Arthropoda
- Clade: Pancrustacea
- Class: Insecta
- Order: Lepidoptera
- Superfamily: Noctuoidea
- Family: Erebidae
- Subfamily: Arctiinae
- Genus: Metarctia
- Species: M. inconspicua

Binomial name
- Metarctia inconspicua Holland, 1892

Species of moth

Metarctia inconspicua is a moth of the subfamily Arctiinae. It was described by William Jacob Holland in 1892. It is found in Angola, Cameroon, the Republic of the Congo, the Democratic Republic of the Congo, Ghana, Ivory Coast, Kenya, South Sudan and Tanzania.
