= Metarctia pavlitzkae =

Scientific classification
- Kingdom: Animalia
- Phylum: Arthropoda
- Clade: Pancrustacea
- Class: Insecta
- Order: Lepidoptera
- Superfamily: Noctuoidea
- Family: Erebidae
- Subfamily: Arctiinae
- Genus: Metarctia
- Species: M. pavlitzkae

Binomial name
- Metarctia pavlitzkae (Kiriakoff, 1961)

Synonyms
- Metarctia (Collocaliodes) pavlitzkae Kiriakoff, 1961

Species of moth

Metarctia pavlitzkae is a moth of the subfamily Arctiinae. It was described by Sergius G. Kiriakoff in 1961. It is found in Tanzania.
