= Leucaloa butti =

Scientific classification
- Domain: Eukaryota
- Kingdom: Animalia
- Phylum: Arthropoda
- Class: Insecta
- Order: Lepidoptera
- Superfamily: Noctuoidea
- Family: Erebidae
- Subfamily: Arctiinae
- Genus: Leucaloa
- Species: L. butti

Binomial name
- Leucaloa butti (Rothschild, 1910)

Synonyms
- Diacrisia butti Rothschild, 1910

Species of moth

Leucaloa butti is a moth of the family Erebidae. It was described by Rothschild in 1910. It is found in South Africa.
