= Ilemodes isogyna =

Scientific classification
- Domain: Eukaryota
- Kingdom: Animalia
- Phylum: Arthropoda
- Class: Insecta
- Order: Lepidoptera
- Superfamily: Noctuoidea
- Family: Erebidae
- Subfamily: Arctiinae
- Genus: Ilemodes
- Species: I. isogyna

Binomial name
- Ilemodes isogyna Romieux, 1935

Species of moth

Ilemodes isogyna is a moth of the family Erebidae. It is found in the Democratic Republic of Congo, Malawi, Tanzania and Zimbabwe.
