= Eurosia annulata =

Scientific classification
- Kingdom: Animalia
- Phylum: Arthropoda
- Class: Insecta
- Order: Lepidoptera
- Superfamily: Noctuoidea
- Family: Erebidae
- Subfamily: Arctiinae
- Genus: Eurosia
- Species: E. annulata

Binomial name
- Eurosia annulata Hampson, 1900

Species of moth

Eurosia annulata is a moth of the family Erebidae first described by George Hampson in 1900. It is found in India.
