= Eurosia (moth) =

Scientific classification
- Domain: Eukaryota
- Kingdom: Animalia
- Phylum: Arthropoda
- Class: Insecta
- Order: Lepidoptera
- Superfamily: Noctuoidea
- Family: Erebidae
- Subfamily: Arctiinae
- Tribe: Lithosiini
- Genus: Eurosia; Hampson, 1900

Genus of moths

Eurosia is a genus of moths in the family Erebidae. The genus was erected by George Hampson in 1900.

== Species ==
- Eurosia annulata
- Eurosia bicolor
- Eurosia costinota
- Eurosia fuliginea
- Eurosia fuscipunctata
- Eurosia grisea
- Eurosia lineata
- Eurosia ludekingi
- Eurosia melanopera
- Eurosia puncticosta
- Eurosia punctitermia
- Eurosia substrigillata
- Eurosia trimaculata
