= Metarctia epimela =

Scientific classification
- Kingdom: Animalia
- Phylum: Arthropoda
- Clade: Pancrustacea
- Class: Insecta
- Order: Lepidoptera
- Superfamily: Noctuoidea
- Family: Erebidae
- Subfamily: Arctiinae
- Genus: Metarctia
- Species: M. epimela

Binomial name
- Metarctia epimela (Kiriakoff, 1979)

Synonyms
- Metarhodia epimela Kiriakoff, 1979

Species of moth

Metarctia epimela is a moth of the subfamily Arctiinae. It was described by Sergius G. Kiriakoff in 1979. It is found in Tanzania.
