= Eurosia puncticosta =

Scientific classification
- Kingdom: Animalia
- Phylum: Arthropoda
- Class: Insecta
- Order: Lepidoptera
- Superfamily: Noctuoidea
- Family: Erebidae
- Subfamily: Arctiinae
- Genus: Eurosia
- Species: E. puncticosta

Binomial name
- Eurosia puncticosta Hampson, 1911

Species of moth

Eurosia puncticosta is a moth of the family Erebidae. It is found on the Bacan Islands.
