= Metarctia flaviciliata =

Scientific classification
- Kingdom: Animalia
- Phylum: Arthropoda
- Clade: Pancrustacea
- Class: Insecta
- Order: Lepidoptera
- Superfamily: Noctuoidea
- Family: Erebidae
- Subfamily: Arctiinae
- Genus: Metarctia
- Species: M. flaviciliata

Binomial name
- Metarctia flaviciliata Hampson, 1907

Species of moth

Metarctia flaviciliata is a moth of the subfamily Arctiinae. It was described by George Hampson in 1907. It is found in Cameroon, the Democratic Republic of the Congo, Kenya and Uganda.
