= Archilema dentata =

Scientific classification
- Domain: Eukaryota
- Kingdom: Animalia
- Phylum: Arthropoda
- Class: Insecta
- Order: Lepidoptera
- Superfamily: Noctuoidea
- Family: Erebidae
- Subfamily: Arctiinae
- Genus: Archilema
- Species: A. dentata

Binomial name
- Archilema dentata Kühne, 2007

Species of moth

Archilema dentata is a moth of the subfamily Arctiinae. It was described by Lars Kühne in 2007. It is found in Kenya.
