= Metarctia pumila =

Scientific classification
- Kingdom: Animalia
- Phylum: Arthropoda
- Clade: Pancrustacea
- Class: Insecta
- Order: Lepidoptera
- Superfamily: Noctuoidea
- Family: Erebidae
- Subfamily: Arctiinae
- Genus: Metarctia
- Species: M. pumila

Binomial name
- Metarctia pumila Hampson, 1909

Species of moth

Metarctia pumila is a moth of the subfamily Arctiinae. It was described by George Hampson in 1909. It is found in Eritrea, Ethiopia, Sudan, Uganda and possibly the Democratic Republic of the Congo.
