= Pasteosia =

Scientific classification
- Kingdom: Animalia
- Phylum: Arthropoda
- Class: Insecta
- Order: Lepidoptera
- Superfamily: Noctuoidea
- Family: Erebidae
- Subfamily: Arctiinae
- Tribe: Lithosiini
- Genus: Pasteosia; Hampson, 1900

Genus of moths

Pasteosia is a genus of moths in the subfamily Arctiinae.

== Species ==
- Pasteosia irrorata Hampson, 1900
- Pasteosia orientalis Hampson, 1909
- Pasteosia plumbea Hampson, 1900
