= Metarctia galla =

Scientific classification
- Kingdom: Animalia
- Phylum: Arthropoda
- Clade: Pancrustacea
- Class: Insecta
- Order: Lepidoptera
- Superfamily: Noctuoidea
- Family: Erebidae
- Subfamily: Arctiinae
- Genus: Metarctia
- Species: M. galla

Binomial name
- Metarctia galla Rougeot, 1977

Species of moth

Metarctia galla is a moth of the subfamily Arctiinae. It was described by Rougeot in 1977. It is found in Ethiopia.
