= Metarctia virgata =

Scientific classification
- Kingdom: Animalia
- Phylum: Arthropoda
- Clade: Pancrustacea
- Class: Insecta
- Order: Lepidoptera
- Superfamily: Noctuoidea
- Family: Erebidae
- Subfamily: Arctiinae
- Genus: Metarctia
- Species: M. virgata

Binomial name
- Metarctia virgata Joicey & Talbot, 1921

Synonyms
- Metarctia wittei Debauche, 1942

Species of moth

Metarctia virgata is a moth of the subfamily Arctiinae. It was described by James John Joicey and George Talbot in 1921. It is found in the Democratic Republic of the Congo and Uganda.
