= Metarctia subincarnata =

Scientific classification
- Kingdom: Animalia
- Phylum: Arthropoda
- Clade: Pancrustacea
- Class: Insecta
- Order: Lepidoptera
- Superfamily: Noctuoidea
- Family: Erebidae
- Subfamily: Arctiinae
- Genus: Metarctia
- Species: M. subincarnata

Binomial name
- Metarctia subincarnata (Kiriakoff, 1954)

Synonyms
- Hebena subincarnata Kiriakoff, 1954

Species of moth

Metarctia subincarnata is a moth of the subfamily Arctiinae. It was described by Sergius G. Kiriakoff in 1954. It is found in the Democratic Republic of the Congo.
