= Archilema modiolus =

Scientific classification
- Domain: Eukaryota
- Kingdom: Animalia
- Phylum: Arthropoda
- Class: Insecta
- Order: Lepidoptera
- Superfamily: Noctuoidea
- Family: Erebidae
- Subfamily: Arctiinae
- Genus: Archilema
- Species: A. modiolus

Binomial name
- Archilema modiolus (Kiriakoff, 1958)

Synonyms
- Eilema modiolus Kiriakoff, 1958; Paratesma modiolus (Kiriakoff, 1958)

Species of moth

Archilema modiolus is a moth of the subfamily Arctiinae. It is found in Kenya and Uganda.
