= Leucaloa =

Scientific classification
- Kingdom: Animalia
- Phylum: Arthropoda
- Class: Insecta
- Order: Lepidoptera
- Superfamily: Noctuoidea
- Family: Erebidae
- Subfamily: Arctiinae
- Subtribe: Spilosomina
- Genus: Leucaloa; Butler, 1875

Type species
- Spilosoma eugraphica Walker, [1865] 1864

Genus of moths

Leucaloa is a genus of tiger moths in the family Erebidae. The moths in the genus are found in the Afrotropics.

== Species ==
- Leucaloa butti (Rothschild, 1910)
- Leucaloa eugraphica (Walker, [1865] 1864)
- Leucaloa infragyrea (Saalmüller, 1891)
- Leucaloa nyasica (Hampson, 1911)
