= Metarctia tricolorana =

Scientific classification
- Kingdom: Animalia
- Phylum: Arthropoda
- Clade: Pancrustacea
- Class: Insecta
- Order: Lepidoptera
- Superfamily: Noctuoidea
- Family: Erebidae
- Subfamily: Arctiinae
- Genus: Metarctia
- Species: M. tricolorana

Binomial name
- Metarctia tricolorana Wichgraf, 1922

Species of moth

Metarctia tricolorana is a moth of the subfamily Arctiinae. It was described by Wichgraf in 1922. It is found in Uganda.
