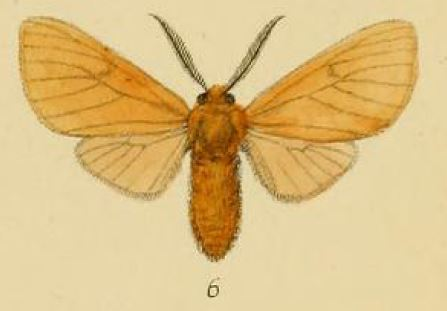
- Metarctia burra

Scientific classification
- Kingdom: Animalia
- Phylum: Arthropoda
- Class: Insecta
- Order: Lepidoptera
- Superfamily: Noctuoidea
- Family: Erebidae
- Subfamily: Arctiinae
- Tribe: Syntomini
- Genus: Metarctia; Walker, 1855

Synonyms
- Metaretia Pagenstecher, 1909; Anace Walker, 1856; Hebena Walker, 1856; Hexaneura Wallengren, 1860; Notharctia Strand, 1912; Thyretarctia Strand, 1912; Mecistorhabdia Kiriakoff, 1953; Metarhodia Kiriakoff, 1953; Oenarctia Kiriakoff, 1953; Pterophaea Kiriakoff, 1953; Collocaliodes Kiriakoff, 1957; Pinheya Kiriakoff, 1973; Pinheyata Nye, 1980

= Metarctia =

Genus of moths

Metarctia is a genus of moths in the family Erebidae and subfamily Arctiinae. The genus was erected by Francis Walker in 1855.

== Species ==
- Metarctia aethiops (Kiriakoff, 1953)
- Metarctia alticola Aurivillius, 1925
- Metarctia atrivenata Kiriakoff, 1956
- Metarctia benitensis Holland, 1893
- Metarctia brunneipennis Hering, 1932
- Metarctia brunneoaurantiaca (Kiriakoff, 1973)
- Metarctia burra (Schaus, 1893)
- Metarctia burungae Debauche, 1942
- Metarctia carmel Kiriakoff, 1957
- Metarctia cinnamomea (Wallengren, 1860)
- Metarctia collocalia Kiriakoff, 1957
- Metarctia confederationis Kiriakoff, 1961
- Metarctia crocina (Kiriakoff, 1973)
- Metarctia debauchei Kiriakoff, 1953
- Metarctia didyma Kiriakoff, 1957
- Metarctia diversa Bethune-Baker, 1911
- Metarctia dracoena (Kiriakoff, 1953)
- Metarctia epimela (Kiriakoff, 1979)
- Metarctia fario Kiriakoff, 1957
- Metarctia flaviciliata Hampson, 1907
- Metarctia flavicincta Aurivillius, 1900
- Metarctia flavivena Hampson, 1901
- Metarctia flora Kiriakoff, 1957
- Metarctia fontainei Kiriakoff, 1953
- Metarctia forsteri Kiriakoff, 1955
- Metarctia fuliginosa Kiriakoff, 1953
- Metarctia fulvia Hampson, 1901
- Metarctia fusca Hampson, 1901
- Metarctia galla Rougeot, 1977
- Metarctia haematica Holland, 1893
- Metarctia haematricha Hampson, 1905
- Metarctia hebenoides (Kiriakoff, 1973)
- Metarctia heinrichi Kiriakoff, 1961
- Metarctia henrardi Kiriakoff, 1953
- Metarctia heringi Kiriakoff, 1957
- Metarctia hulstaertiana Kiriakoff, 1953
- Metarctia hypomela Kiriakoff, 1956
- Metarctia inconspicua Holland, 1892
- Metarctia infausta Kiriakoff, 1957
- Metarctia insignis Kiriakoff, 1959
- Metarctia jansei (Kiriakoff, 1957)
- Metarctia johanna (Kiriakoff, 1979)
- Metarctia jordani Kiriakoff, 1957
- Metarctia kumasina Strand, 1920
- Metarctia lateritia (Herrich-Schäffer, 1855)
- Metarctia lindemannae Kiriakoff, 1961
- Metarctia longipalpis Hulstaert, 1923
- Metarctia lugubris Gaede, 1926
- Metarctia maria Kiriakoff, 1957
- Metarctia metaleuca Hampson, 1914
- Metarctia morag Kiriakoff, 1957
- Metarctia morosa Kiriakoff, 1957
- Metarctia negusi Kiriakoff, 1957
- Metarctia nigricornis Debauche, 1942
- Metarctia nigritarsis Berio, 1941
- Metarctia noctis Druce, 1910
- Metarctia olbrechtsi (Kiriakoff, 1953)
- Metarctia pallens Bethune-Baker, 1911
- Metarctia pamela Kiriakoff, 1957
- Metarctia paremphares Holland, 1893
- Metarctia paulis Kiriakoff, 1961
- Metarctia pavlitzkae (Kiriakoff, 1961)
- Metarctia phaeoptera Hampson, 1909
- Metarctia priscilla Kiriakoff, 1957
- Metarctia pulverea Hampson, 1907
- Metarctia pumila Hampson, 1909
- Metarctia quinta (Kiriakoff, 1973)
- Metarctia robusta (Kiriakoff, 1973)
- Metarctia rubra (Walker, 1856)
- Metarctia rubribasa Bethune-Baker, 1911
- Metarctia rubripuncta Hampson, 1898
- Metarctia rufescens Walker, 1855
- Metarctia saalfeldi Kiriakoff, 1960
- Metarctia salmonea Kiriakoff, 1957
- Metarctia sarcosoma Hampson, 1901
- Metarctia schoutedeni Kiriakoff, 1953
- Metarctia seydeliana (Kiriakoff, 1953)
- Metarctia sheljuzhkoi Kiriakoff, 1961
- Metarctia subincarnata (Kiriakoff, 1954)
- Metarctia subpallens Kiriakoff, 1956
- Metarctia tenebrosa (Le Cerf, 1922)
- Metarctia tenera (Kiriakoff, 1973)
- Metarctia transvaalica (Kiriakoff, 1973)
- Metarctia tricolorana Wichgraf, 1922
- Metarctia unicolor (Oberthür, 1880)
- Metarctia uniformis Bethune-Baker, 1911
- Metarctia upembae Kiriakoff, 1949
- Metarctia venustissima Kiriakoff, 1961
- Metarctia virgata Joicey & Talbot, 1921

== Taxonomy ==
Collocaliodes was established as a subgenus of Metarctia.
