= Metarctia didyma =

Scientific classification
- Kingdom: Animalia
- Phylum: Arthropoda
- Clade: Pancrustacea
- Class: Insecta
- Order: Lepidoptera
- Superfamily: Noctuoidea
- Family: Erebidae
- Subfamily: Arctiinae
- Genus: Metarctia
- Species: M. didyma

Binomial name
- Metarctia didyma Kiriakoff, 1957

Species of moth

Metarctia didyma is a moth of the subfamily Arctiinae. It was described by Sergius G. Kiriakoff in 1957. It is found in the Central African Republic, Chad, Ghana, Ivory Coast, Niger and Nigeria.
