= Metarctia kumasina =

Scientific classification
- Kingdom: Animalia
- Phylum: Arthropoda
- Clade: Pancrustacea
- Class: Insecta
- Order: Lepidoptera
- Superfamily: Noctuoidea
- Family: Erebidae
- Subfamily: Arctiinae
- Genus: Metarctia
- Species: M. kumasina

Binomial name
- Metarctia kumasina Strand, 1920

Synonyms
- Metarctia pallida var. kumasina Strand, 1920; Metarctia jubdoensis Kiriakoff, 1955

Species of moth

Metarctia kumasina is a moth of the subfamily Arctiinae. It was described by Strand in 1920. It is found in Cameroon, Ethiopia and Ghana.
