= Metarctia carmel =

Scientific classification
- Kingdom: Animalia
- Phylum: Arthropoda
- Clade: Pancrustacea
- Class: Insecta
- Order: Lepidoptera
- Superfamily: Noctuoidea
- Family: Erebidae
- Subfamily: Arctiinae
- Genus: Metarctia
- Species: M. carmel

Binomial name
- Metarctia carmel Kiriakoff, 1957

Species of moth

Metarctia carmel is a moth of the subfamily Arctiinae. It was described by Sergius G. Kiriakoff in 1957. It is found in Ethiopia.
