= Ctenosia inornata =

Scientific classification
- Domain: Eukaryota
- Kingdom: Animalia
- Phylum: Arthropoda
- Class: Insecta
- Order: Lepidoptera
- Superfamily: Noctuoidea
- Family: Erebidae
- Subfamily: Arctiinae
- Genus: Ctenosia
- Species: C. inornata

Binomial name
- Ctenosia inornata (Wileman, 1919)

Synonyms
- Steneugoa inornata Wileman & South, 1919

Species of moth

Ctenosia inornata is a moth of the subfamily Arctiinae. It was described by Alfred Ernest Wileman. It is found on Luzon in the Philippines.

The wingspan is about 26 mm. The forewings are white tinged with ochreous and flecked with light brown. The postmedial line is dusky and only distinct on the costa as a blackish-brown spot. The hindwings are whitish.
