= Archilema vilis =

Scientific classification
- Kingdom: Animalia
- Phylum: Arthropoda
- Class: Insecta
- Order: Lepidoptera
- Superfamily: Noctuoidea
- Family: Erebidae
- Subfamily: Arctiinae
- Genus: Archilema
- Species: A. vilis

Binomial name
- Archilema vilis Birket-Smith, 1965

Species of moth

Archilema vilis is a moth of the subfamily Arctiinae first described by Sven Jorgen R. Birket-Smith in 1965. It is found in Nigeria.
