= Eurosia trimaculata =

Scientific classification
- Kingdom: Animalia
- Phylum: Arthropoda
- Class: Insecta
- Order: Lepidoptera
- Superfamily: Noctuoidea
- Family: Erebidae
- Subfamily: Arctiinae
- Genus: Eurosia
- Species: E. trimaculata

Binomial name
- Eurosia trimaculata (Hampson, 1893)

Synonyms
- Setinochroa trimaculatus Hampson, 1893; Eurosia trimacula Hampson, 1900

Species of moth

Eurosia trimaculata is a moth of the subfamily Arctiinae first described by George Hampson in 1893. It is found in Sri Lanka.

== Description ==
The wingspan of the male is 18 mm and the female's is 20 mm. In the male, the body is fuscous brown, whereas the head, collar and patagial base are orange. Forewings with black spots at base, middle, and end of cell. There are traces of a curved postmedial line. In the female, the thorax and forewings are yellowish. The postmedial line is more distinct and anal tufts are greyish.
