= Metarctia fontainei =

Scientific classification
- Kingdom: Animalia
- Phylum: Arthropoda
- Clade: Pancrustacea
- Class: Insecta
- Order: Lepidoptera
- Superfamily: Noctuoidea
- Family: Erebidae
- Subfamily: Arctiinae
- Genus: Metarctia
- Species: M. fontainei

Binomial name
- Metarctia fontainei Kiriakoff, 1953

Synonyms
- Metarctia flavicincta fontainei Kiriakoff, 1953

Species of moth

Metarctia fontainei is a moth of the subfamily Arctiinae. It was described by Sergius G. Kiriakoff in 1953. It is found in the Democratic Republic of the Congo.
