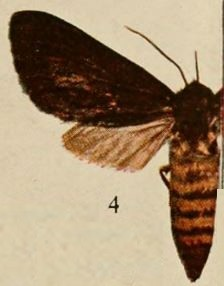

Scientific classification
- Kingdom: Animalia
- Phylum: Arthropoda
- Clade: Pancrustacea
- Class: Insecta
- Order: Lepidoptera
- Superfamily: Noctuoidea
- Family: Erebidae
- Subfamily: Arctiinae
- Genus: Metarctia
- Species: M. rubripuncta

Binomial name
- Metarctia rubripuncta Hampson, 1898

Synonyms
- Metarctia chapini Holland, 1920; Automolis chapini; Metarctia denisae Dufrane, 1945; Metarctia impura Kiriakoff, 1959; Metarctia rosea Aurivillius, 1906

= Metarctia rubripuncta =

Species of moth

Metarctia rubripuncta is a moth of the subfamily Arctiinae. It was described by George Hampson in 1898. It is found in Burundi, Cameroon, Republic of the Congo, Democratic Republic of the Congo, Ethiopia, Gabon, Kenya, Rwanda, Tanzania, Uganda and Zimbabwe.
