= Metarctia unicolor =

Scientific classification
- Kingdom: Animalia
- Phylum: Arthropoda
- Clade: Pancrustacea
- Class: Insecta
- Order: Lepidoptera
- Superfamily: Noctuoidea
- Family: Erebidae
- Subfamily: Arctiinae
- Genus: Metarctia
- Species: M. unicolor

Binomial name
- Metarctia unicolor (Oberthür, 1880)

Synonyms
- Automolis unicolor Oberthür, 1880; Metarctia abyssinibia Kiriakoff, 1957; Metarctia aegrota Berio, 1939; Metarctia erlangeri Rothschild, 1910; Metarctia major Le Cerf, 1922

Species of moth

Metarctia unicolor is a moth of the subfamily Arctiinae. It was described by Oberthür in 1880. It is found in Angola, the Democratic Republic of Congo, Eritrea, Ethiopia and Kenya.
