= Ilemodes =

Scientific classification
- Kingdom: Animalia
- Phylum: Arthropoda
- Class: Insecta
- Order: Lepidoptera
- Superfamily: Noctuoidea
- Family: Erebidae
- Subfamily: Arctiinae
- Tribe: Arctiini
- Subtribe: Incertae sedis
- Genus: Ilemodes; Hampson, 1900

Genus of moths

Ilemodes is a genus of moths in the family Erebidae first described by George Hampson in 1900.

== Species ==
- Ilemodes astriga Hampson, 1916
- Ilemodes heterogyna Hampson, 1900
- Ilemodes interjecta (Strand, 1912)
- Ilemodes isogyna Romieux, 1935
