= Eurozonosia =

Scientific classification
- Kingdom: Animalia
- Phylum: Arthropoda
- Class: Insecta
- Order: Lepidoptera
- Superfamily: Noctuoidea
- Family: Erebidae
- Subfamily: Arctiinae
- Tribe: Lithosiini
- Genus: Eurozonosia; Hampson, 1914

Genus of moths

Eurozonosia is a genus of moths in the subfamily Arctiinae.

== Species ==
- Eurozonosia atricincta Hampson, 1918
- Eurozonosia fulvinigra Hampson, 1914
- Eurozonosia inconstans Butler, 1896
