= Metarctia metaleuca =

Scientific classification
- Kingdom: Animalia
- Phylum: Arthropoda
- Clade: Pancrustacea
- Class: Insecta
- Order: Lepidoptera
- Superfamily: Noctuoidea
- Family: Erebidae
- Subfamily: Arctiinae
- Genus: Metarctia
- Species: M. metaleuca

Binomial name
- Metarctia metaleuca Hampson, 1914

Species of moth

Metarctia metaleuca is a moth of the subfamily Arctiinae. It was described by George Hampson in 1914. It is found in Kenya, Liberia and Uganda.
