= Ilemodes interjecta =

Scientific classification
- Kingdom: Animalia
- Phylum: Arthropoda
- Class: Insecta
- Order: Lepidoptera
- Superfamily: Noctuoidea
- Family: Erebidae
- Subfamily: Arctiinae
- Genus: Ilemodes
- Species: I. interjecta

Binomial name
- Ilemodes interjecta (Strand, 1912)

Synonyms
- Paraona interjecta Strand, 1912

Species of moth

Ilemodes interjecta is a moth of the family Erebidae. It was described by Strand in 1912. It is found in Lesotho, South Africa, Zimbabwe, and Kenya. It was moved from the genus Paraona to the genus Ilemodes in 2024 and is still often recognized as Paraona interjecta.
