= Metarctia cinnamomea =

Scientific classification
- Kingdom: Animalia
- Phylum: Arthropoda
- Clade: Pancrustacea
- Class: Insecta
- Order: Lepidoptera
- Superfamily: Noctuoidea
- Family: Erebidae
- Subfamily: Arctiinae
- Genus: Metarctia
- Species: M. cinnamomea

Binomial name
- Metarctia cinnamomea (Wallengren, 1860)

Synonyms
- Hexaneura cinnamomea Wallengren, 1860

Species of moth

Metarctia cinnamomea is a moth of the subfamily Arctiinae. It was described by Wallengren in 1860. It is found in South Africa.
