= Dasyarctia =

Scientific classification
- Domain: Eukaryota
- Kingdom: Animalia
- Phylum: Arthropoda
- Class: Insecta
- Order: Lepidoptera
- Superfamily: Noctuoidea
- Family: Erebidae
- Subfamily: Arctiinae
- Genus: Dasyarctia; Gaede, 1923
- Species: D. grisea

Binomial name
- Dasyarctia grisea Gaede, 1923

Genus of moths

Dasyarctia is a monotypic genus of tiger moths in the family Erebidae. The genus includes only one species, Dasyarctia grisea, which is found in South Africa and Tanzania.
