= Metarctia lateritia =

Scientific classification
- Kingdom: Animalia
- Phylum: Arthropoda
- Clade: Pancrustacea
- Class: Insecta
- Order: Lepidoptera
- Superfamily: Noctuoidea
- Family: Erebidae
- Subfamily: Arctiinae
- Genus: Metarctia
- Species: M. lateritia

Binomial name
- Metarctia lateritia (Herrich-Schäffer, 1855)

Synonyms
- Automolis lateritia Herrich-Schäffer, 1855; Hebena venosa Walker, 1856

Species of moth

Metarctia lateritia is a moth of the subfamily Arctiinae. It was described by Gottlieb August Wilhelm Herrich-Schäffer in 1855. It is found in Angola, Botswana, Burundi, Cameroon, the Democratic Republic of the Congo, Eritrea, Eswatini, Ethiopia, Kenya, Lesotho, Malawi, Rwanda, South Africa, Tanzania, Uganda, Zambia and Zimbabwe.
