= Cacosoma =

Scientific classification
- Kingdom: Animalia
- Phylum: Arthropoda
- Class: Insecta
- Order: Lepidoptera
- Superfamily: Noctuoidea
- Family: Erebidae
- Subfamily: Arctiinae
- Genus: Cacosoma; Felder, 1874
- Species: C. gnatula

Binomial name
- Cacosoma gnatula (Boisduval, 1847)

Synonyms
- Naclia gnatula Boisduval, 1847; Cacosoma naclioides Felder, 1874

Genus of moths

Cacosoma is a genus of moth in the subfamily Arctiinae. It contains only one species, Cacosoma gnatula, which is found in South Africa.
