= Eurosia fuliginea =

Scientific classification
- Kingdom: Animalia
- Phylum: Arthropoda
- Class: Insecta
- Order: Lepidoptera
- Superfamily: Noctuoidea
- Family: Erebidae
- Subfamily: Arctiinae
- Genus: Eurosia
- Species: E. fuliginea

Binomial name
- Eurosia fuliginea Hampson, 1903

Species of moth

Eurosia fuliginea is a moth of the family Erebidae. It is found in South Africa.
