= Eilema vicara =

Scientific classification
- Domain: Eukaryota
- Kingdom: Animalia
- Phylum: Arthropoda
- Class: Insecta
- Order: Lepidoptera
- Superfamily: Noctuoidea
- Family: Erebidae
- Subfamily: Arctiinae
- Genus: Eilema
- Species: E. vicara

Binomial name
- Eilema vicara Strand, 1922

Species of moth

Eilema vicara is a moth of the subfamily Arctiinae. It was described by Strand in 1922. It is found in the Democratic Republic of Congo, Rwanda and South Africa.
