= Eurozonosia inconstans =

Scientific classification
- Domain: Eukaryota
- Kingdom: Animalia
- Phylum: Arthropoda
- Class: Insecta
- Order: Lepidoptera
- Superfamily: Noctuoidea
- Family: Erebidae
- Subfamily: Arctiinae
- Genus: Eurozonosia
- Species: E. inconstans

Binomial name
- Eurozonosia inconstans (Butler, 1896)

Synonyms
- Dictenus inconstans Butler, 1896; Thumata limbulata Strand, 1912; Asura thumathaeformis Strand, 1912

Species of moth

Eurozonosia inconstans is a moth of the subfamily Arctiinae. It was described by Arthur Gardiner Butler in 1896. It is found in Malawi and South Africa.
