= Sozusa heterocera =

Scientific classification
- Kingdom: Animalia
- Phylum: Arthropoda
- Class: Insecta
- Order: Lepidoptera
- Superfamily: Noctuoidea
- Family: Erebidae
- Subfamily: Arctiinae
- Genus: Sozusa
- Species: S. heterocera

Binomial name
- Sozusa heterocera (Walker, 1864)

Synonyms
- Lithosia heterocera Walker, 1864

Species of moth

Sozusa heterocera is a moth in the subfamily Arctiinae. It was described by Francis Walker in 1864. It is found in South Africa.
