= Exilisia bipuncta =

Scientific classification
- Kingdom: Animalia
- Phylum: Arthropoda
- Class: Insecta
- Order: Lepidoptera
- Superfamily: Noctuoidea
- Family: Erebidae
- Subfamily: Arctiinae
- Genus: Exilisia
- Species: E. bipuncta

Binomial name
- Exilisia bipuncta (Hampson, 1900)

Synonyms
- Philenora bipuncta Hampson, 1900; Philenora bipuncta ab. prominens Strand, 1922

Species of moth

Exilisia bipuncta is a moth of the subfamily Arctiinae. It was described by George Hampson in 1900. It is found on Madagascar.
