= Macrosia chalybeata =

Scientific classification
- Kingdom: Animalia
- Phylum: Arthropoda
- Class: Insecta
- Order: Lepidoptera
- Superfamily: Noctuoidea
- Family: Erebidae
- Subfamily: Arctiinae
- Genus: Macrosia
- Species: M. chalybeata

Binomial name
- Macrosia chalybeata Hampson, 1901

Synonyms
- Eilema chalybeata Hampson, 1901

Species of moth

Macrosia chalybeata is a moth of the subfamily Arctiinae. It was described by George Hampson in 1901. It is found in Kenya, Lesotho, Malawi, South Africa and Zimbabwe.
