= Metarctia paremphares =

Scientific classification
- Kingdom: Animalia
- Phylum: Arthropoda
- Clade: Pancrustacea
- Class: Insecta
- Order: Lepidoptera
- Superfamily: Noctuoidea
- Family: Erebidae
- Subfamily: Arctiinae
- Genus: Metarctia
- Species: M. paremphares

Binomial name
- Metarctia paremphares Holland, 1893

Synonyms
- Metarctia capricornis Kiriakoff, 1957; Metarctia orientalis Kiriakoff, 1956

Species of moth

Metarctia paremphares is a moth of the subfamily Arctiinae. It was described by William Jacob Holland in 1893. It is found in Angola, the Democratic Republic of the Congo, Gabon, Ghana, Kenya, Rwanda, Tanzania, Zimbabwe and possibly South Africa.
