= Ctenosia psectriphora =

Scientific classification
- Domain: Eukaryota
- Kingdom: Animalia
- Phylum: Arthropoda
- Class: Insecta
- Order: Lepidoptera
- Superfamily: Noctuoidea
- Family: Erebidae
- Subfamily: Arctiinae
- Genus: Ctenosia
- Species: C. psectriphora

Binomial name
- Ctenosia psectriphora (Distant, 1899)

Synonyms
- Pusiola psectriphora Distant, 1899

Species of moth

Ctenosia psectriphora is a moth of the subfamily Arctiinae. It was described by William Lucas Distant in 1899. It is found in South Africa.
