= Paramaenas affinis =

Scientific classification
- Domain: Eukaryota
- Kingdom: Animalia
- Phylum: Arthropoda
- Class: Insecta
- Order: Lepidoptera
- Superfamily: Noctuoidea
- Family: Erebidae
- Subfamily: Arctiinae
- Genus: Paramaenas
- Species: P. affinis

Binomial name
- Paramaenas affinis (Rothschild, 1933)

Synonyms
- Pericallia affinis Rothschild, 1933

Species of moth

Paramaenas affinis is a moth of the family Erebidae. It was described by Rothschild in 1933. It is found in Namibia and South Africa.
