= Cragia distigmata =

Scientific classification
- Kingdom: Animalia
- Phylum: Arthropoda
- Class: Insecta
- Order: Lepidoptera
- Superfamily: Noctuoidea
- Family: Erebidae
- Subfamily: Arctiinae
- Genus: Cragia
- Species: C. distigmata

Binomial name
- Cragia distigmata (Hampson, 1901)

Synonyms
- Ilema distigmata Hampson, 1901; Eilema distigmata

Species of moth

Cragia distigmata is a moth of the subfamily Arctiinae. It was described by George Hampson in 1901. It is found in the Democratic Republic of the Congo, Equatorial Guinea, Ghana, Kenya, Nigeria, South Africa, Tanzania, Togo and Uganda.
