= Galtara doriae =

Scientific classification
- Domain: Eukaryota
- Kingdom: Animalia
- Phylum: Arthropoda
- Class: Insecta
- Order: Lepidoptera
- Superfamily: Noctuoidea
- Family: Erebidae
- Subfamily: Arctiinae
- Genus: Galtara
- Species: G. doriae

Binomial name
- Galtara doriae (Oberthür, 1880)

Synonyms
- Pseudocallimorpha doriae Oberthür, 1880

Species of moth

Galtara doriae is a moth of the subfamily Arctiinae. It was described by Charles Oberthür in 1880. It is found in the Democratic Republic of the Congo, Ethiopia, Kenya, Malawi, Rwanda, South Africa, Tanzania and Uganda.

== Subspecies ==
- Galtara doriae doriae
- Galtara doriae megadoriae Toulgoët, 1977 (Ethiopia)
