= Metarctia rubra =

Scientific classification
- Kingdom: Animalia
- Phylum: Arthropoda
- Clade: Pancrustacea
- Class: Insecta
- Order: Lepidoptera
- Superfamily: Noctuoidea
- Family: Erebidae
- Subfamily: Arctiinae
- Genus: Metarctia
- Species: M. rubra

Binomial name
- Metarctia rubra (Walker, 1856)

Synonyms
- Anace rubra Walker, 1856; Automolis kelleni Snellen, 1886; Metarctia titan Talbot, 1929

Species of moth

Metarctia rubra is a moth of the subfamily Arctiinae. It was described by Francis Walker in 1856. It is found in Angola, Malawi and South Africa.
