= Amata endocrocis =

Scientific classification
- Kingdom: Animalia
- Phylum: Arthropoda
- Class: Insecta
- Order: Lepidoptera
- Superfamily: Noctuoidea
- Family: Erebidae
- Subfamily: Arctiinae
- Genus: Amata
- Species: A. endocrocis

Binomial name
- Amata endocrocis (Hampson, 1903)

Synonyms
- Syntomis endocrocis Hampson, 1903; Syntomis endocrossis Hampson, 1905

Species of moth

Amata endocrocis is a moth of the family Erebidae. It was described by George Hampson in 1903. It is found in the Democratic Republic of the Congo, South Africa and Zimbabwe.
