= Sozusa triangulata =

Scientific classification
- Domain: Eukaryota
- Kingdom: Animalia
- Phylum: Arthropoda
- Class: Insecta
- Order: Lepidoptera
- Superfamily: Noctuoidea
- Family: Erebidae
- Subfamily: Arctiinae
- Genus: Sozusa
- Species: S. triangulata

Binomial name
- Sozusa triangulata Kühne, 2010

Species of moth

Sozusa triangulata is a moth in the subfamily Arctiinae. It was described by Lars Kühne in 2010. It is found in South Africa.
