= Amata atricornis =

Scientific classification
- Kingdom: Animalia
- Phylum: Arthropoda
- Class: Insecta
- Order: Lepidoptera
- Superfamily: Noctuoidea
- Family: Erebidae
- Subfamily: Arctiinae
- Genus: Amata
- Species: A. atricornis

Binomial name
- Amata atricornis (Wallengren, 1863)

Synonyms
- Asinusea atricornis Wallengren, 1863; Syntomis sirius Distant, 1897

Species of moth

Amata atricornis is a moth of the family Erebidae. It was described by Wallengren in 1863. It is found in South Africa and Zimbabwe.
