= Metarctia brunneipennis =

Scientific classification
- Kingdom: Animalia
- Phylum: Arthropoda
- Clade: Pancrustacea
- Class: Insecta
- Order: Lepidoptera
- Superfamily: Noctuoidea
- Family: Erebidae
- Subfamily: Arctiinae
- Genus: Metarctia
- Species: M. brunneipennis

Binomial name
- Metarctia brunneipennis Hering, 1932

Species of moth

Metarctia brunneipennis is a moth of the subfamily Arctiinae. It was described by Hering in 1932. It is found in the Democratic Republic of Congo and South Africa.
