= Pusiola poliosia =

Scientific classification
- Domain: Eukaryota
- Kingdom: Animalia
- Phylum: Arthropoda
- Class: Insecta
- Order: Lepidoptera
- Superfamily: Noctuoidea
- Family: Erebidae
- Subfamily: Arctiinae
- Genus: Pusiola
- Species: P. poliosia

Binomial name
- Pusiola poliosia (Kiriakoff, 1958)

Synonyms
- Phryganopsis poliosia Kiriakoff, 1958; Archilema lucens Durante & Panzera, 2002

Species of moth

Pusiola poliosia is a moth of the subfamily Arctiinae. It was described by Sergius G. Kiriakoff in 1958. It is found in Kenya, Nigeria and Uganda.
