= Ilemodes astriga =

Scientific classification
- Kingdom: Animalia
- Phylum: Arthropoda
- Class: Insecta
- Order: Lepidoptera
- Superfamily: Noctuoidea
- Family: Erebidae
- Subfamily: Arctiinae
- Tribe: Arctiini
- Subtribe: Incertae sedis
- Genus: Ilemodes
- Species: I. astriga

Binomial name
- Ilemodes astriga Hampson, 1916

Species of moth

Ilemodes astriga is a moth of the family Erebidae first described by George Hampson in 1916. It is found in Ethiopia, Kenya, Malawi, Mozambique, South Africa, Uganda, Zambia and Zimbabwe.
