= Opsaroa =

Scientific classification
- Kingdom: Animalia
- Phylum: Arthropoda
- Class: Insecta
- Order: Lepidoptera
- Superfamily: Noctuoidea
- Family: Erebidae
- Subfamily: Arctiinae
- Tribe: Lithosiini
- Genus: Opsaroa; Hampson, 1905
- Species: O. fulvinota

Binomial name
- Opsaroa fulvinota Hampson, 1905

Genus of moths

Opsaroa is a genus of moths in the subfamily Arctiinae. It contains the single species Opsaroa fulvinota, which is found in South Africa.
