= Metarctia benitensis =

Scientific classification
- Kingdom: Animalia
- Phylum: Arthropoda
- Clade: Pancrustacea
- Class: Insecta
- Order: Lepidoptera
- Superfamily: Noctuoidea
- Family: Erebidae
- Subfamily: Arctiinae
- Genus: Metarctia
- Species: M. benitensis

Binomial name
- Metarctia benitensis Holland, 1893

Synonyms
- Metarctia paniscus Kiriakoff, 1957; Metarctia subnigra Kiriakoff, 1958

Species of moth

Metarctia benitensis is a moth of the subfamily Arctiinae. It was described by William Jacob Holland in 1893. It is found in Cameroon, the Democratic Republic of the Congo, Equatorial Guinea, Kenya, Lesotho, South Africa, Sudan and Uganda.
