= Paramaenas strigosus =

Scientific classification
- Domain: Eukaryota
- Kingdom: Animalia
- Phylum: Arthropoda
- Class: Insecta
- Order: Lepidoptera
- Superfamily: Noctuoidea
- Family: Erebidae
- Subfamily: Arctiinae
- Genus: Paramaenas
- Species: P. strigosus

Binomial name
- Paramaenas strigosus Grünberg, 1911

Species of moth

Paramaenas strigosus is a moth of the family Erebidae. It was described by Karl Grünberg in 1911. It is found in Kenya, Lesotho, Namibia, South Africa and Zimbabwe.
