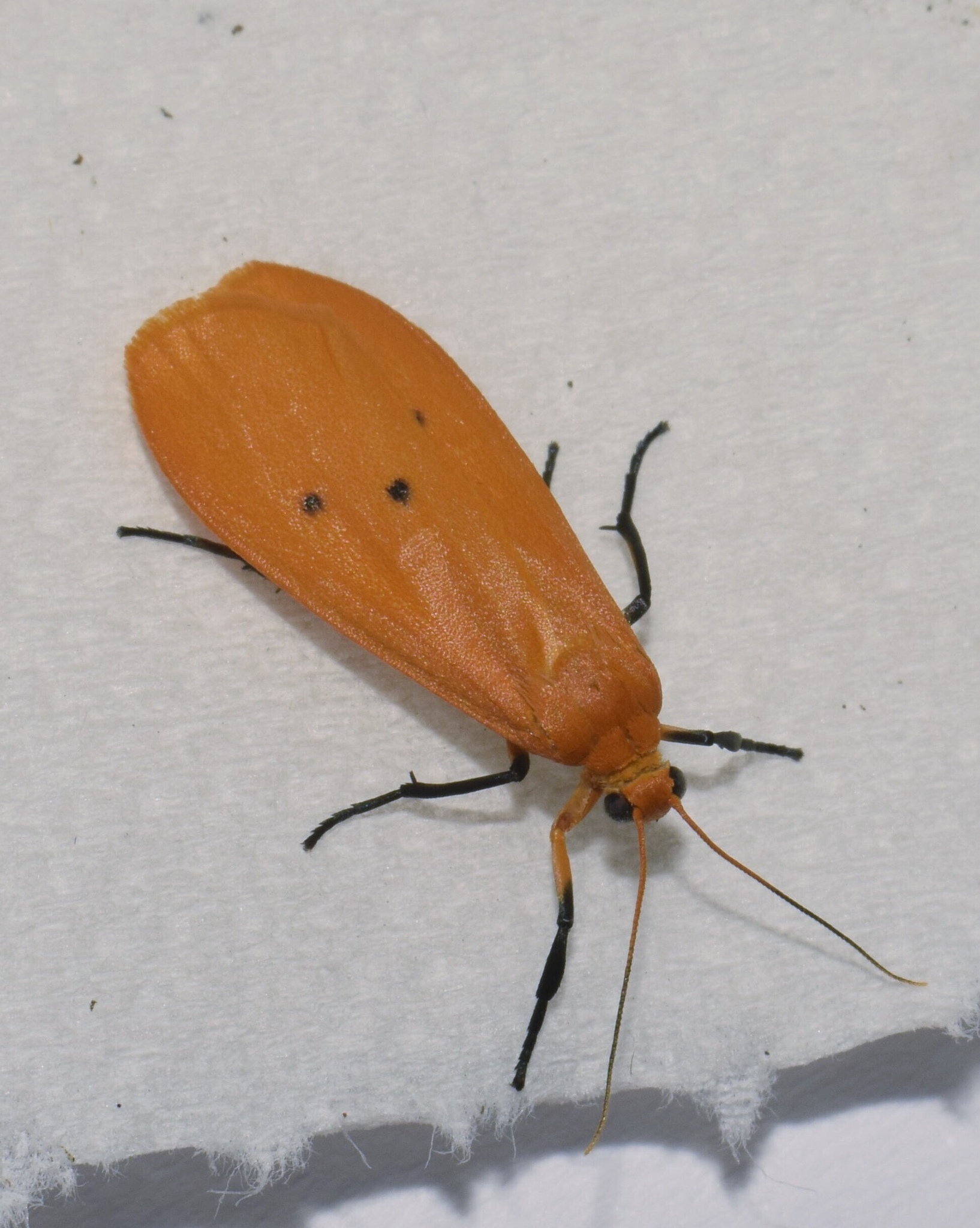

Scientific classification
- Kingdom: Animalia
- Phylum: Arthropoda
- Clade: Pancrustacea
- Class: Insecta
- Order: Lepidoptera
- Superfamily: Noctuoidea
- Family: Erebidae
- Subfamily: Arctiinae
- Genus: Cragia
- Species: C. quadrinotata

Binomial name
- Cragia quadrinotata (Walker, 1864)

Synonyms
- Setina quadrinotata Walker, 1864; Eilema quadrinotata; Tigrioides bipunctigera Hampson, 1900

= Cragia quadrinotata =

Species of moth

Cragia quadrinotata is a moth of the subfamily Arctiinae. It was described by Francis Walker in 1864. It is found in Kenya, Rwanda, South Africa and Uganda.
