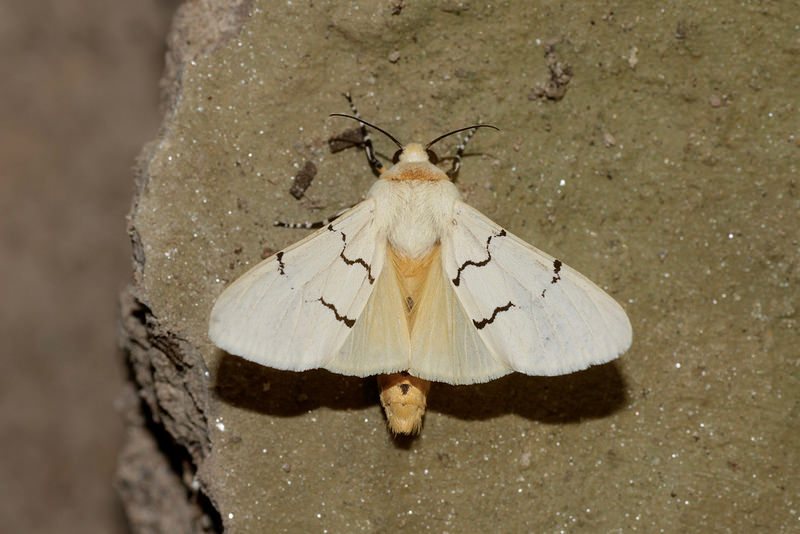
- In South Africa
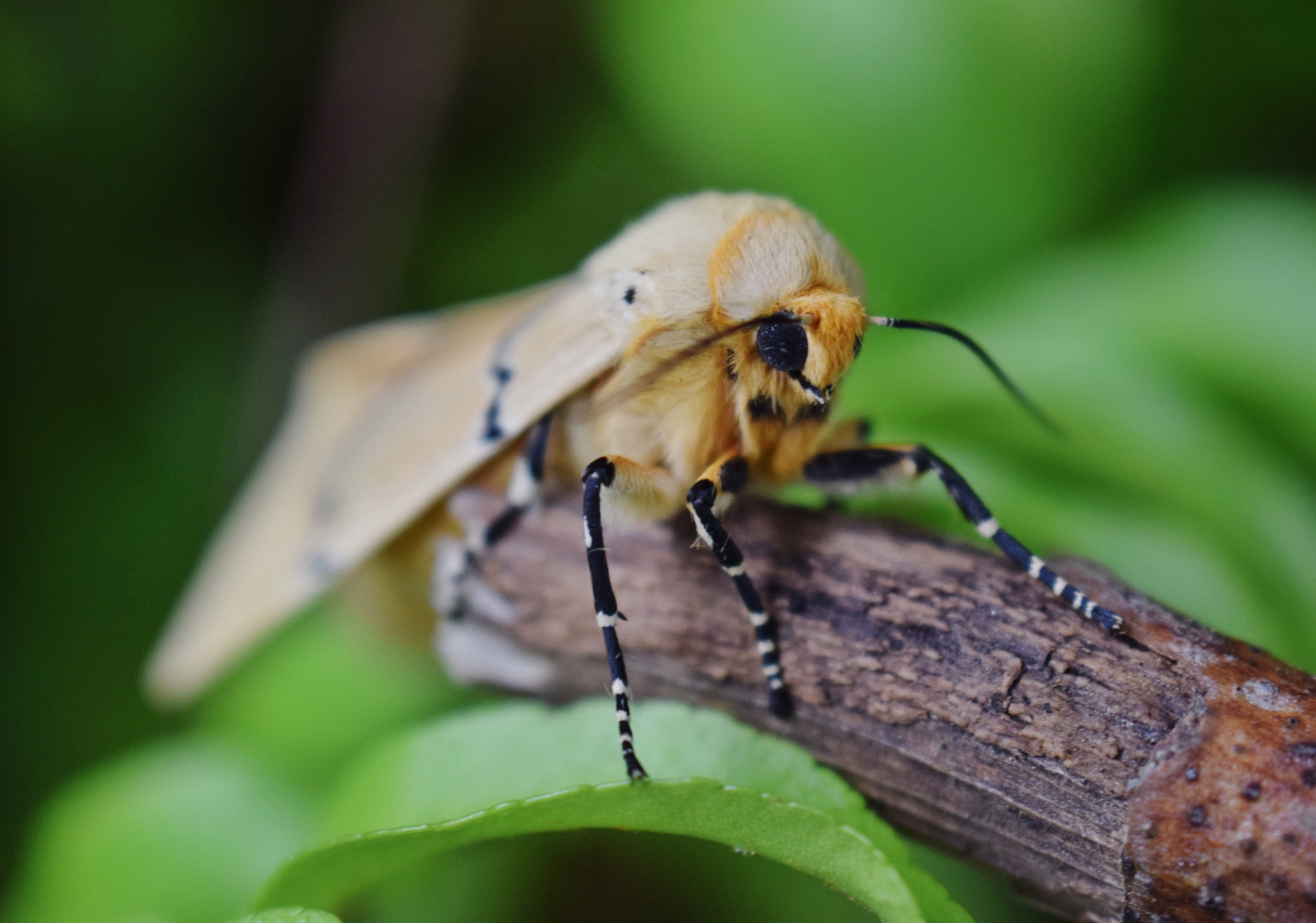

Scientific classification
- Kingdom: Animalia
- Phylum: Arthropoda
- Class: Insecta
- Order: Lepidoptera
- Superfamily: Noctuoidea
- Family: Erebidae
- Subfamily: Arctiinae
- Genus: Leucaloa
- Species: L. eugraphica

Binomial name
- Leucaloa eugraphica (Walker, 1865)

Synonyms
- Aloa undistriga Felder, 1874; Spilosoma eugraphica Walker, 1864

= Leucaloa eugraphica =

Species of moth endemic to Southern Africa

Leucaloa eugraphica is a moth of the family Erebidae, subfamily Arctiinae. The species was first described by Francis Walker in 1865. It is known from South Africa and Lesotho.

The larvae feed on Thunbergia alata, Heliotropium sp., Lonicera sempervirens, Tagetes erecta and Acacia mearnsii

== Gallery ==
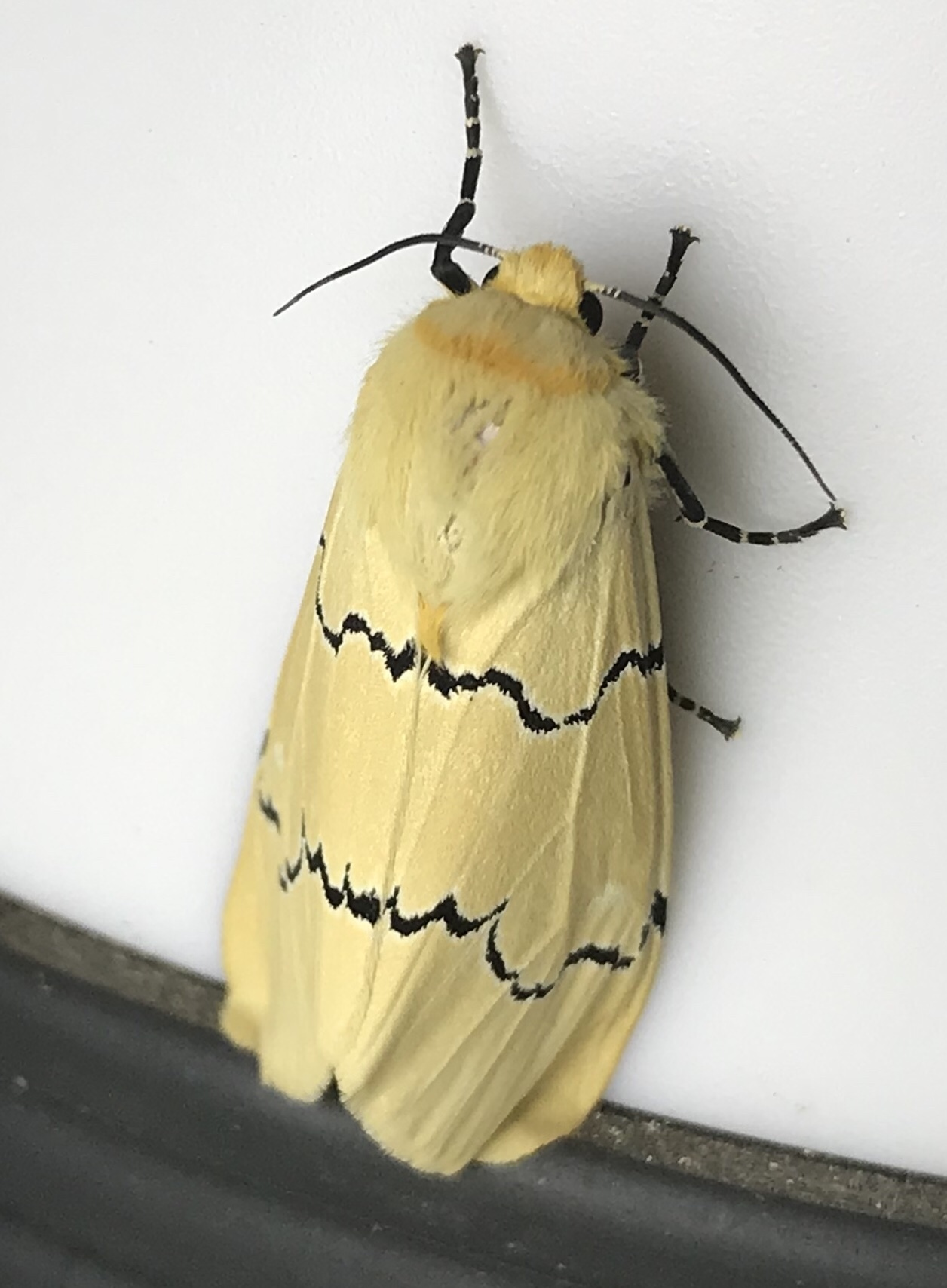
Markings when wings are closed.

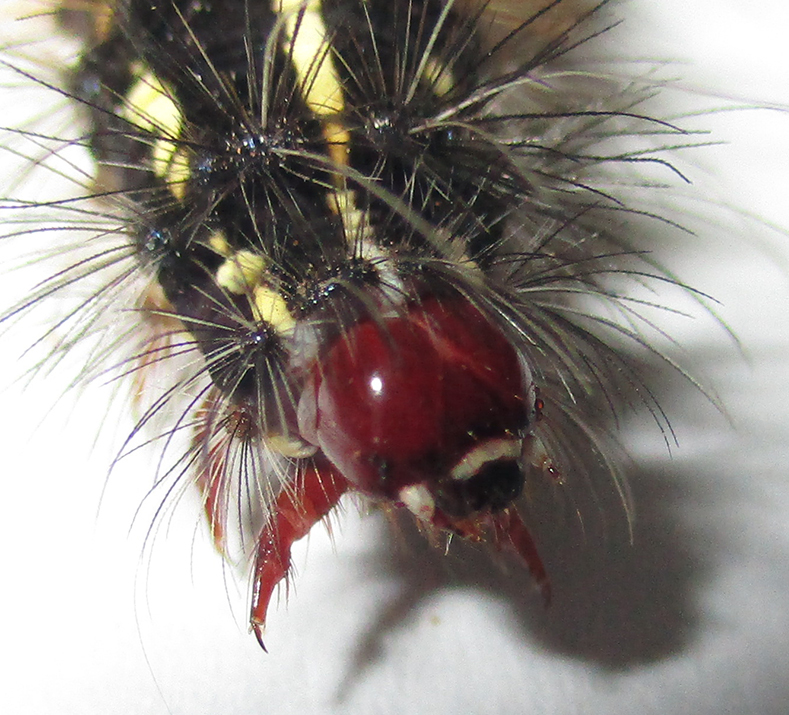
Close-up of the red caterpillar head.

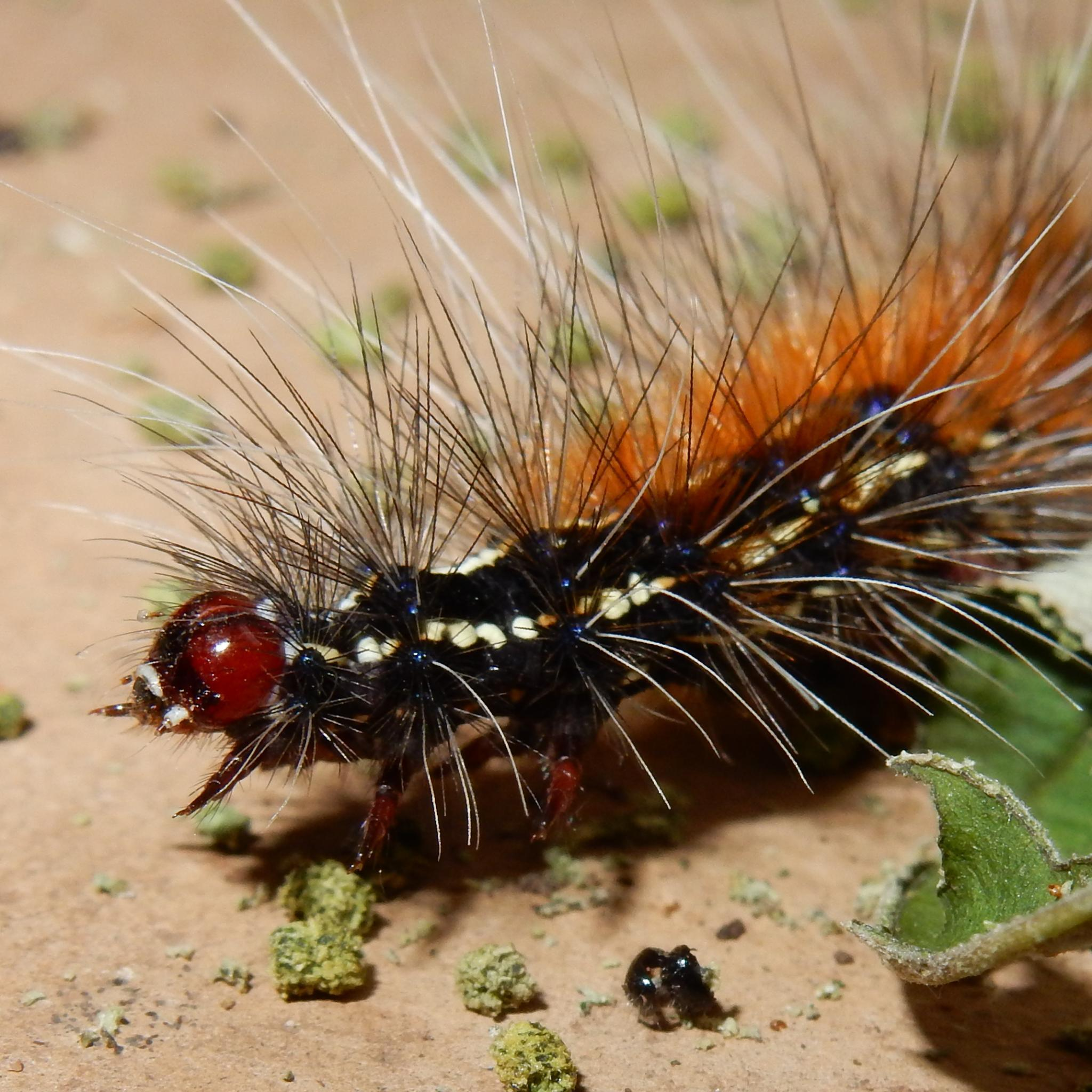
Distinctive iridescent blue dots at the base of the spines.
