= Macrosia fumeola =

Scientific classification
- Kingdom: Animalia
- Phylum: Arthropoda
- Class: Insecta
- Order: Lepidoptera
- Superfamily: Noctuoidea
- Family: Erebidae
- Subfamily: Arctiinae
- Genus: Macrosia
- Species: M. fumeola

Binomial name
- Macrosia fumeola (Walker, 1854)

Synonyms
- Lithosia fumeola Walker, 1854; Lithosia natalica Möschler, 1872

Species of moth

Macrosia fumeola is a moth of the subfamily Arctiinae. It was described by Francis Walker in 1854. It is found in Eritrea, Lesotho, South Africa and Tanzania.
