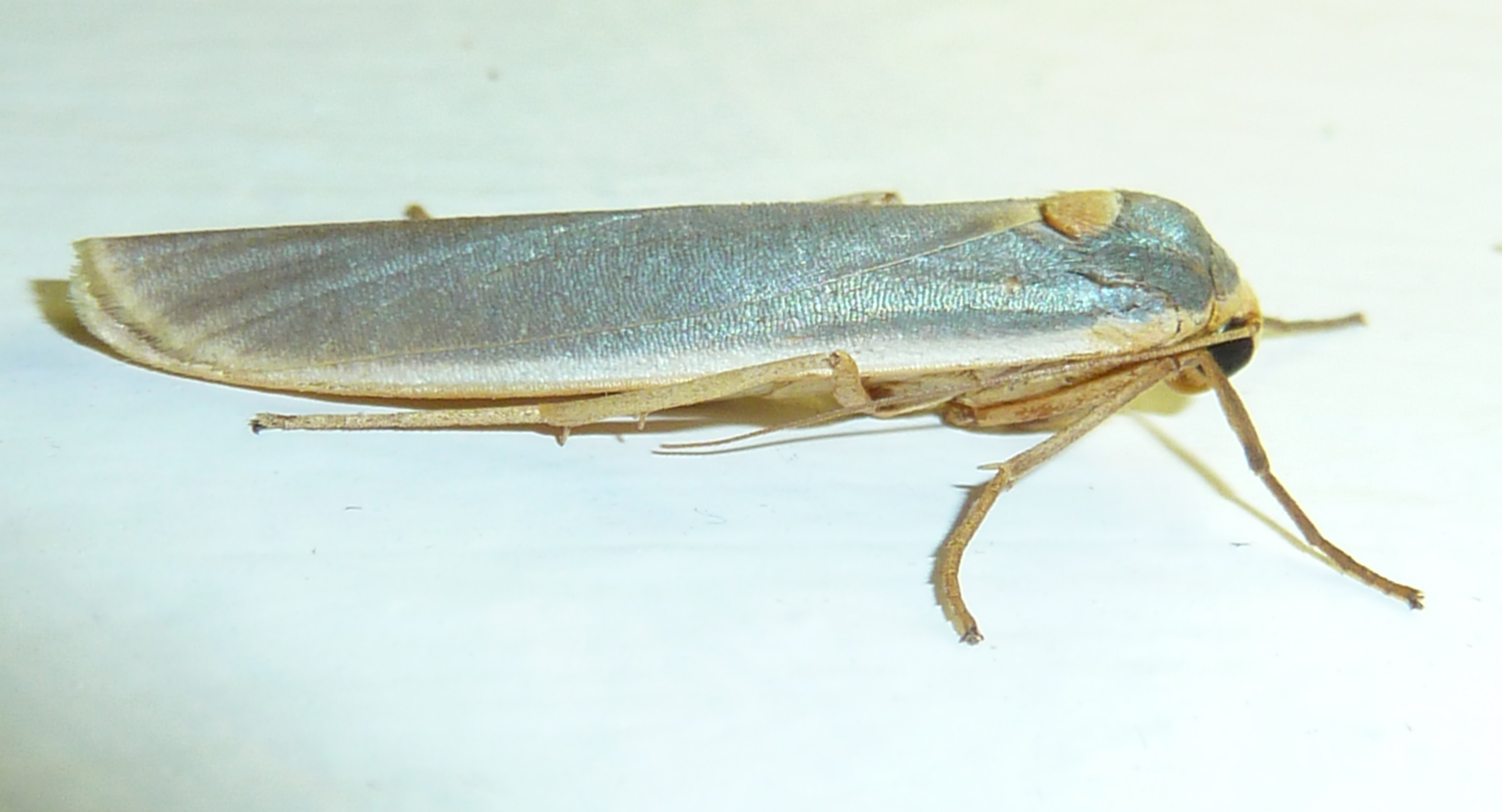

Scientific classification
- Kingdom: Animalia
- Phylum: Arthropoda
- Class: Insecta
- Order: Lepidoptera
- Superfamily: Noctuoidea
- Family: Erebidae
- Subfamily: Arctiinae
- Genus: Sozusa
- Species: S. scutellata

Binomial name
- Sozusa scutellata (Wallengren, 1860)

Synonyms
- Lithosia scutellata Wallengren, 1860; Lithosia dorsoglauca Walker, 1865

= Sozusa scutellata =

Species of moth

Sozusa scutellata is a moth in the subfamily Arctiinae. It was described by Wallengren in 1860. It is found in South Africa.
