= Pasteosia irrorata =

Scientific classification
- Kingdom: Animalia
- Phylum: Arthropoda
- Class: Insecta
- Order: Lepidoptera
- Superfamily: Noctuoidea
- Family: Erebidae
- Subfamily: Arctiinae
- Genus: Pasteosia
- Species: P. irrorata

Binomial name
- Pasteosia irrorata Hampson, 1900

Species of moth

Pasteosia irrorata is a moth of the subfamily Arctiinae. It was described by George Hampson in 1900. It is found in South Africa.
