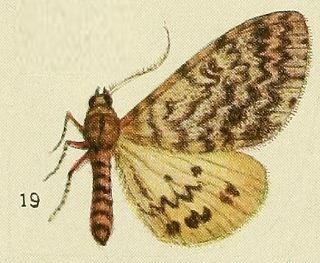

Scientific classification
- Kingdom: Animalia
- Phylum: Arthropoda
- Class: Insecta
- Order: Lepidoptera
- Superfamily: Noctuoidea
- Family: Erebidae
- Subfamily: Arctiinae
- Genus: Paramaenas
- Species: P. nephelistis

Binomial name
- Paramaenas nephelistis (Hampson, 1907)

Synonyms
- Pericallia nephelistis Hampson, 1907; Pericallia hecate Fawcett, 1916; Pericallia diaphana Rothschild, 1933

= Paramaenas nephelistis =

Species of moth

Paramaenas nephelistis is a moth of the family Erebidae. It was described by George Hampson in 1907. It is found in Angola, Kenya and South Africa.

== Subspecies ==
- Paramaenas nephelistis nephelistis
- Paramaenas nephelistis diaphana (Rothschild, 1933)
- Paramaenas nephelistis hecate (Fawcett, 1916)
