= Eilema gracilipennis =

Scientific classification
- Kingdom: Animalia
- Phylum: Arthropoda
- Class: Insecta
- Order: Lepidoptera
- Superfamily: Noctuoidea
- Family: Erebidae
- Subfamily: Arctiinae
- Genus: Eilema
- Species: E. gracilipennis

Binomial name
- Eilema gracilipennis (Wallengren, 1860)

Synonyms
- Lithosia gracilipennis Wallengren, 1860; Onychopoda elongata Rothschild, 1912; Manuela planissima Wallengren, 1875

Species of moth

Eilema gracilipennis is a moth of the subfamily Arctiinae. It was described by Wallengren in 1860. It is found in the Democratic Republic of Congo, Kenya, South Africa and Uganda.
