= Sozusa despecta =

Scientific classification
- Kingdom: Animalia
- Phylum: Arthropoda
- Class: Insecta
- Order: Lepidoptera
- Superfamily: Noctuoidea
- Family: Erebidae
- Subfamily: Arctiinae
- Genus: Sozusa
- Species: S. despecta

Binomial name
- Sozusa despecta (Walker, 1862)

Synonyms
- Lithosia despecta Walker, 1862

Species of moth

Sozusa despecta is a moth in the subfamily Arctiinae. It was described by Francis Walker in 1862. It is found in South Africa.
