= Archilema uelleburgensis =

Scientific classification
- Domain: Eukaryota
- Kingdom: Animalia
- Phylum: Arthropoda
- Class: Insecta
- Order: Lepidoptera
- Superfamily: Noctuoidea
- Family: Erebidae
- Subfamily: Arctiinae
- Genus: Archilema
- Species: A. uelleburgensis

Binomial name
- Archilema uelleburgensis (Strand, 1912)

Synonyms
- Eilema uelleburgensis Strand, 1912; Ilema achrosis Hampson, 1918

Species of moth

Archilema uelleburgensis is a moth of the subfamily Arctiinae. It was described by Embrik Strand in 1912, originally under the genus Eilema. It is found in Equatorial Guinea, Kenya, Malawi, Nigeria, South Africa and Uganda.
