= Amata cuprizonata =

Scientific classification
- Kingdom: Animalia
- Phylum: Arthropoda
- Class: Insecta
- Order: Lepidoptera
- Superfamily: Noctuoidea
- Family: Erebidae
- Subfamily: Arctiinae
- Genus: Amata
- Species: A. cuprizonata

Binomial name
- Amata cuprizonata (Hampson, 1901)

Synonyms
- Syntomis cuprizonata Hampson, 1901

Species of moth

Amata cuprizonata is a moth of the subfamily Arctiinae. It was described by George Hampson in 1901. It is found in Kenya, South Africa, Tanzania and Uganda.
