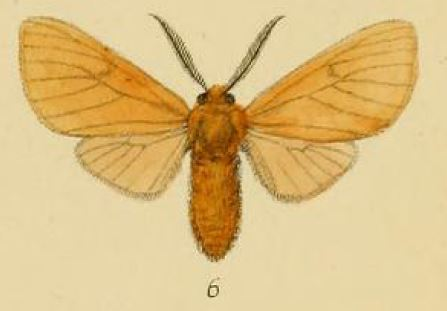
- Metarctia burra

Scientific classification
- Kingdom: Animalia
- Phylum: Arthropoda
- Clade: Pancrustacea
- Class: Insecta
- Order: Lepidoptera
- Superfamily: Noctuoidea
- Family: Erebidae
- Subfamily: Arctiinae
- Genus: Metarctia
- Species: M. burra

Binomial name
- Metarctia burra (Schaus & Clements, 1893)

Synonyms
- Anace burra Schaus & Clements, 1893; Metarctia chryseis (Kiriakoff, 1973); Metarctia hector Kiriakoff, 1959; Metarctia sudanica (Kiriakoff, 1973)

= Metarctia burra =

Species of moth

Metarctia burra is a moth of the subfamily Arctiinae. It is found in many African countries from Sierra Leone to Somalia down to South Africa.
