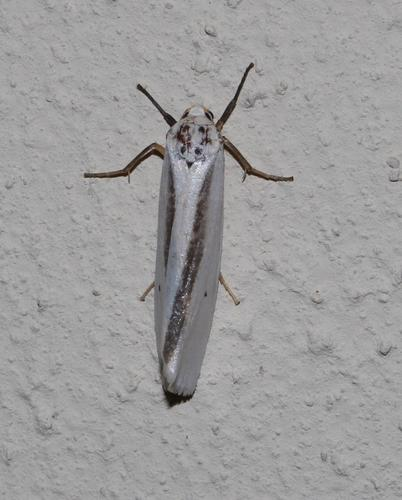

Scientific classification
- Kingdom: Animalia
- Phylum: Arthropoda
- Class: Insecta
- Order: Lepidoptera
- Superfamily: Noctuoidea
- Family: Erebidae
- Subfamily: Arctiinae
- Tribe: Arctiini
- Subtribe: Incertae sedis
- Genus: Ilemodes
- Species: I. heterogyna

Binomial name
- Ilemodes heterogyna Hampson, 1900

Synonyms
- Ilemodes heterogenea Gaede, 1926

= Ilemodes heterogyna =

Species of moth

Ilemodes heterogyna, the broad buttered footman, is a moth belonging to the Erebidae family. The species was first described by George Hampson in 1900. It is found in Malawi, South Africa, Uganda, Ethiopia and Kenya.

The larvae feed on lichens.

== Subspecies ==
- Ilemodes heterogyna heterogyna
- Ilemodes heterogyna astrigoides Rothschild, 1933 (Ethiopia, Kenya)
