= Metarctia rufescens =

Scientific classification
- Kingdom: Animalia
- Phylum: Arthropoda
- Clade: Pancrustacea
- Class: Insecta
- Order: Lepidoptera
- Superfamily: Noctuoidea
- Family: Erebidae
- Subfamily: Arctiinae
- Genus: Metarctia
- Species: M. rufescens

Binomial name
- Metarctia rufescens Walker, 1855

Synonyms
- Hexaneura maculifera Wallengren, 1860

Species of moth

Metarctia rufescens is a moth of the subfamily Arctiinae. It was described by Francis Walker in 1855. It is found in Burundi, the Republic of the Congo, the Democratic Republic of the Congo, Gabon, Kenya, Mozambique, Rwanda, South Africa, Tanzania and Zambia.
