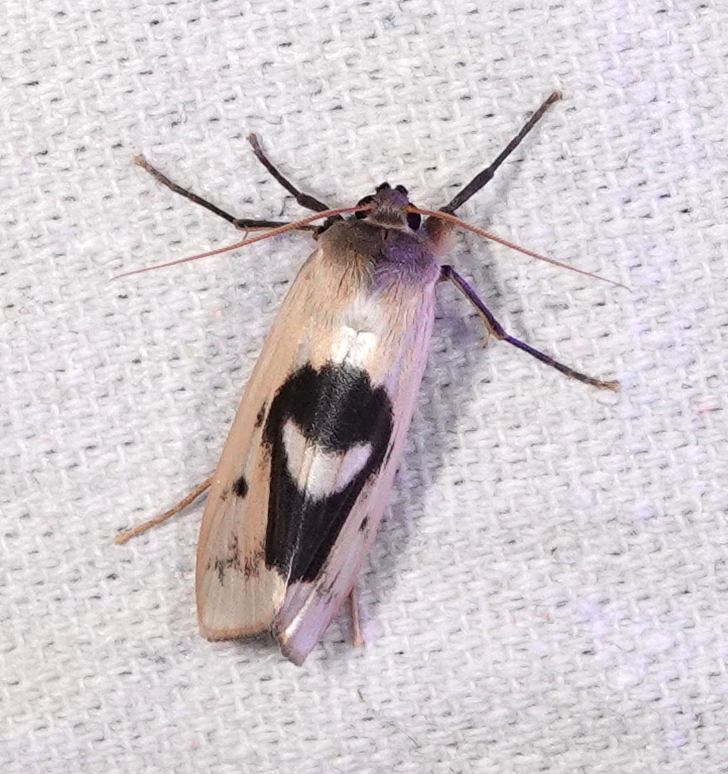
- Agylla nitidalis

Scientific classification
- Kingdom: Animalia
- Phylum: Arthropoda
- Class: Insecta
- Order: Lepidoptera
- Superfamily: Noctuoidea
- Family: Erebidae
- Subfamily: Arctiinae
- Tribe: Lithosiini
- Subtribe: Lithosiina; Billberg, 1820

= Lithosiina =

Subtribe of moths

The Lithosiina are a subtribe of lichen moths in the family Erebidae. The taxon was erected by Gustaf Johan Billberg in 1820.

== Taxonomy ==
The subtribe used to be classified as the tribe Lithosiini of the subfamily Lithosiinae of the family Arctiidae.

== Genera ==
The following genera are included in the subtribe.

- Aedoea
- Agylla
- Apaidia
- Apistosia
- Asiapistosia
- Atolmis
- Blaviodes
- Brunia
- Bucsekia
- Calamidia
- Capissa
- Chrysorabdia
- Chrysoscota
- Collita
- Crambidia
- Cybosia
- Danielithosia
- Denteilema
- Dolgoma
- Eilema
- Euconosia
- Gampola
- Gandhara
- Gardinia
- Ghoria
- Gnamptonychia
- Graphosia
- Hesudra
- Hyposhada
- Inopsis
- Katha
- Lambula
- Lambulodes
- Lithosia
- Macohasa
- Macotasa
- Macrobrochis
- Mantala
- Manulea
- Microlithosia
- Mithuna
- Monosyntaxis
- Muscula
- Neosyntaxis
- Nishada
- Oeonistis
- Oeonosia
- Palaeosia
- Papuasyntaxis
- Paraona
- Pelosia
- Planovalvata
- Poliosia
- Prabhasa
- Pseudoscaptia
- Scoliacma
- Scoliosia
- Semicalamidia
- Setema
- Sozusa
- Striosia
- Tarika
- Teratopora
- Teulisna
- Thysanoptyx
- Tigrioides
- Tylanthes
- Vamuna
- Wittia
- Zadadra
- Zobida
