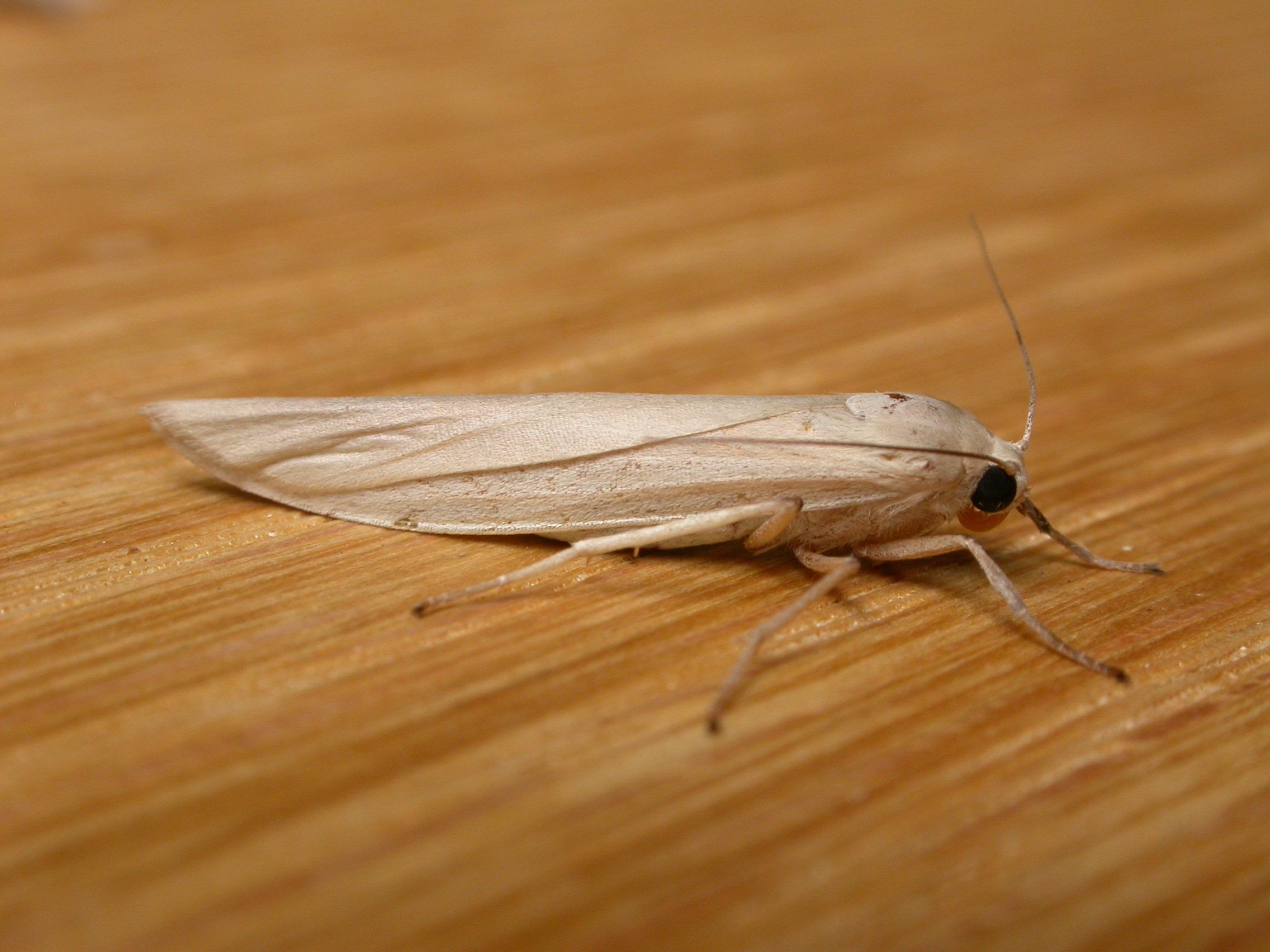
- Calamidia hirta

Scientific classification
- Domain: Eukaryota
- Kingdom: Animalia
- Phylum: Arthropoda
- Class: Insecta
- Order: Lepidoptera
- Superfamily: Noctuoidea
- Family: Erebidae
- Subfamily: Arctiinae
- Subtribe: Lithosiina
- Genus: Calamidia; Butler, 1877

= Calamidia =

Genus of moths

Calamidia is a genus of tiger moths in the family Erebidae.

== Species ==
- Calamidia hirta Walker, 1854
  - Syn. Calamidia salpinctis

== Former species ==
- Calamidia castanea Rothschild, 1912
- Calamidia goliathina
- Calamidia owgarra Bethune-Baker, 1908
- Calamidia reticulata
- Calamidia warringtonella Bethune-Baker, 1908
