= Asiapistosia =

Scientific classification
- Kingdom: Animalia
- Phylum: Arthropoda
- Clade: Pancrustacea
- Class: Insecta
- Order: Lepidoptera
- Superfamily: Noctuoidea
- Family: Erebidae
- Subfamily: Arctiinae
- Subtribe: Lithosiina
- Genus: Asiapistosia; Dubatolov & Kishida, 2012

Genus of moths

Asiapistosia is a genus of moths in the subfamily Arctiinae.

== Species ==
- Asiapistosia subnigra (Leech, 1899)
- Asiapistosia stigma (C.L. Fang, 2000)

Asiapistosia stigma was formerly place in genus Eilema and Asiapistosia subnigra in genus Oeonistis.
