= Tarika =

Tarika may refer to:

- Tarika (moth), a genus of moth
- Tarika (musical group), musical group from Madagascar
- Tariqah, school of Sufism
