= Monosyntaxis =

Scientific classification
- Domain: Eukaryota
- Kingdom: Animalia
- Phylum: Arthropoda
- Class: Insecta
- Order: Lepidoptera
- Superfamily: Noctuoidea
- Family: Erebidae
- Subfamily: Arctiinae
- Subtribe: Lithosiina
- Genus: Monosyntaxis; Swinhoe, 1901

Synonyms
- Monotaxis Hampson, 1900

Genus of moths

Monosyntaxis is a genus of moths in the family Erebidae. The genus was erected by Swinhoe in 1901.

== Species ==
- Monosyntaxis affinis Rothschild, 1912
- Monosyntaxis bimaculata de Vos, 2009
- Monosyntaxis bipunctata Bethune-Baker, 1904
- Monosyntaxis holmanhunti Hampson, 1914
- Monosyntaxis montanus Schulze, 1910
- Monosyntaxis ochrosphena Wileman & West, 1928
- Monosyntaxis persimilis Rothschild, 1912
- Monosyntaxis radiifera Cerný, 1995
- Monosyntaxis samoensis (Rebel, 1915)
- Monosyntaxis trimaculata (Hampson, 1900)

== Former species ==
- Monosyntaxis metallescens Rothschild, 1912 (now in Papuasyntaxis)
