= Bucsekia =

Scientific classification
- Kingdom: Animalia
- Phylum: Arthropoda
- Clade: Pancrustacea
- Class: Insecta
- Order: Lepidoptera
- Superfamily: Noctuoidea
- Family: Erebidae
- Subfamily: Arctiinae
- Subtribe: Lithosiina
- Genus: Bucsekia; Dubatolov & Y. Kishida, 2012

Genus of moths

Bucsekia is a genus of tiger moths in the family Erebidae. It is known from China and Malaysia. It is closely related to Microlithosia.

== Species ==
There are two recognized species:

- Bucsekia mediumpilosa (Bucsek, 2012)
- Bucsekia yazakii (Dubatolov, Y. Kishida, and Wang, 2012)
