= Gnamptonychia flavicollis =

Scientific classification
- Domain: Eukaryota
- Kingdom: Animalia
- Phylum: Arthropoda
- Class: Insecta
- Order: Lepidoptera
- Superfamily: Noctuoidea
- Family: Erebidae
- Subfamily: Arctiinae
- Genus: Gnamptonychia
- Species: G. flavicollis

Binomial name
- Gnamptonychia flavicollis (H. Druce, 1885)

Synonyms
- Atolmis flavicollis H. Druce, 1885

Species of moth

Gnamptonychia flavicollis is a moth of the family Erebidae. It was described by Herbert Druce in 1885. It is found in Mexico.
