= Apistosia phaeoleuca =

Scientific classification
- Kingdom: Animalia
- Phylum: Arthropoda
- Class: Insecta
- Order: Lepidoptera
- Superfamily: Noctuoidea
- Family: Erebidae
- Subfamily: Arctiinae
- Genus: Apistosia
- Species: A. phaeoleuca

Binomial name
- Apistosia phaeoleuca Dognin, 1899

Species of moth

Apistosia phaeoleuca is a moth of the subfamily Arctiinae. It was described by Paul Dognin in 1899. It is found in Ecuador.
