= Graphosia ochracea =

Scientific classification
- Domain: Eukaryota
- Kingdom: Animalia
- Phylum: Arthropoda
- Class: Insecta
- Order: Lepidoptera
- Superfamily: Noctuoidea
- Family: Erebidae
- Subfamily: Arctiinae
- Genus: Graphosia
- Species: G. ochracea

Binomial name
- Graphosia ochracea Bethune-Baker, 1904

Synonyms
- Pseudilema dinawa Bethune-Baker, 1904; Pseudilema ochracea Bethune-Baker, 1904

Species of moth

Graphosia ochracea is a moth of the family Erebidae. It was described by George Thomas Bethune-Baker in 1904. It is found in New Guinea. The habitat consists of mountainous areas.
