= Inopsis catoxantha =

Scientific classification
- Kingdom: Animalia
- Phylum: Arthropoda
- Clade: Pancrustacea
- Class: Insecta
- Order: Lepidoptera
- Superfamily: Noctuoidea
- Family: Erebidae
- Subfamily: Arctiinae
- Genus: Inopsis
- Species: I. catoxantha

Binomial name
- Inopsis catoxantha Felder, 1874

Synonyms
- Inopsis catoxantha Felder, 1874; Ctenucha imitata H. Edwards, 1887; Apistosia tiria Druce, 1897

Species of moth

Inopsis catoxantha is a moth of the family Erebidae. It was described by Felder in 1874. It is found in Mexico.
