= Lambulodes albiterminalis =

Scientific classification
- Domain: Eukaryota
- Kingdom: Animalia
- Phylum: Arthropoda
- Class: Insecta
- Order: Lepidoptera
- Superfamily: Noctuoidea
- Family: Erebidae
- Subfamily: Arctiinae
- Genus: Lambulodes
- Species: L. albiterminalis

Binomial name
- Lambulodes albiterminalis (Gaede, 1926)

Synonyms
- Garudinodes albiterminalis Gaede, 1926

Species of moth

Lambulodes albiterminalis is a moth of the family Erebidae. It was described by Max Gaede in 1926. It is found in New Guinea and Papua New Guinea. The species is probably restricted to mountainous areas.
