= Hesudra =

Scientific classification
- Domain: Eukaryota
- Kingdom: Animalia
- Phylum: Arthropoda
- Class: Insecta
- Order: Lepidoptera
- Superfamily: Noctuoidea
- Family: Erebidae
- Subfamily: Arctiinae
- Subtribe: Lithosiina
- Genus: Hesudra; Moore, 1878

Type species
- Hesudra divisa Moore, 1878

Genus of moths

Hesudra is a genus of moths in the family Erebidae erected by Frederic Moore in 1878.

== Species ==
- Hesudra bisecta Rothschild, 1912
- Hesudra divisa Moore, 1878
- Hesudra haighti Wileman & South
- Hesudra mjobergi Talbot, 1926
