= Chrysoscota cotriangulata =

Scientific classification
- Kingdom: Animalia
- Phylum: Arthropoda
- Clade: Pancrustacea
- Class: Insecta
- Order: Lepidoptera
- Superfamily: Noctuoidea
- Family: Erebidae
- Subfamily: Arctiinae
- Genus: Chrysoscota
- Species: C. cotriangulata

Binomial name
- Chrysoscota cotriangulata Holloway, 2001

Species of moth

Chrysoscota cotriangulata is a moth of the family Erebidae first described by Jeremy Daniel Holloway in 2001. It is found on Borneo, Java and Sumatra. The habitat consists of lowlands and lower montane forests.

The length of the forewings is 10–11 mm.
