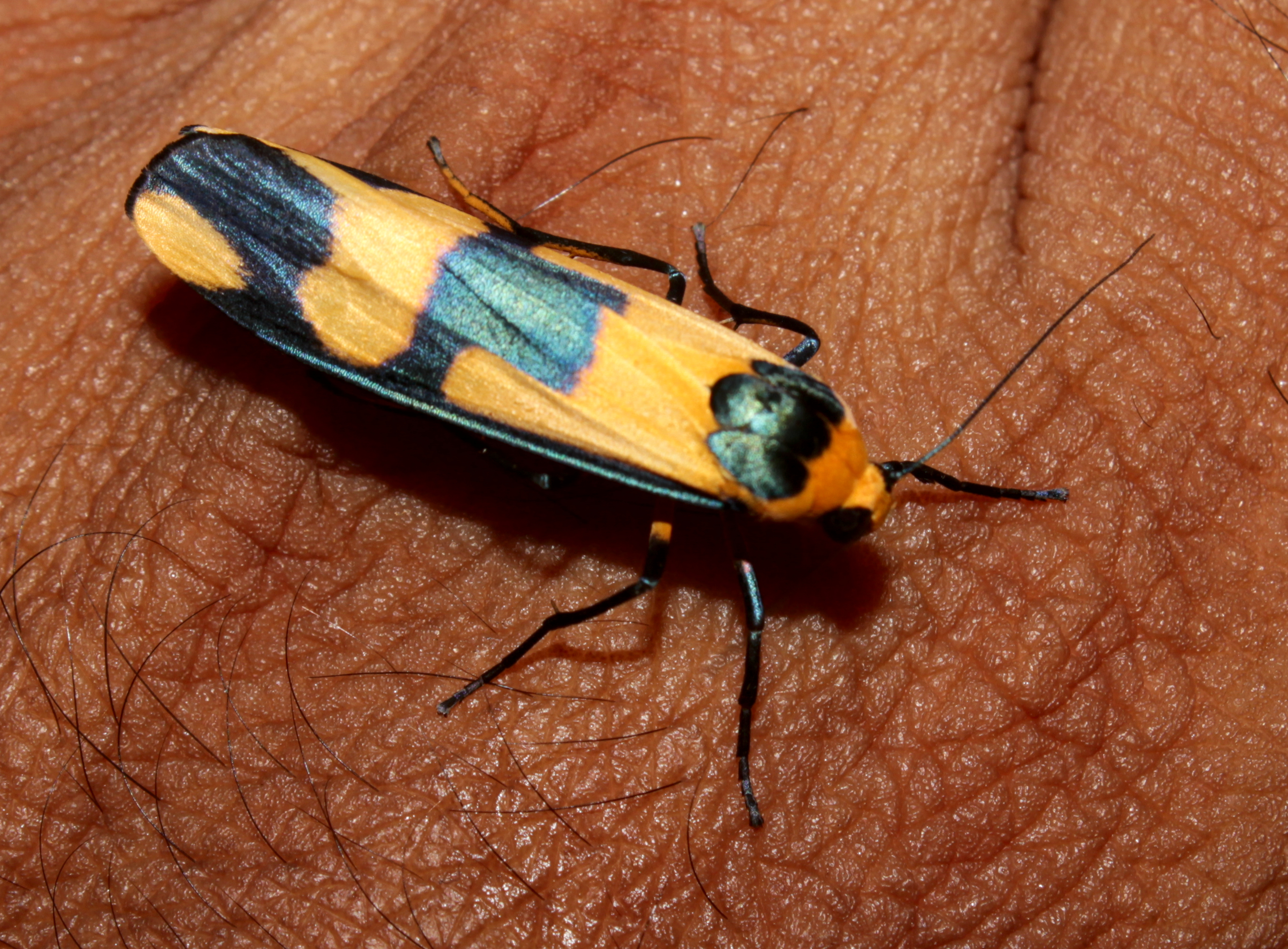
- At Kanjirappally, Kerala

Scientific classification
- Domain: Eukaryota
- Kingdom: Animalia
- Phylum: Arthropoda
- Class: Insecta
- Order: Lepidoptera
- Superfamily: Noctuoidea
- Family: Erebidae
- Subfamily: Arctiinae
- Genus: Oeonistis
- Species: O. entella

Binomial name
- Oeonistis entella (Cramer, 1779)

Synonyms
- Phalaena entella Cramer, [1779]; Noctua convoluta Fabricius, 1781; Oeonistis entelliola Hübner, [1819]; Oeonistis entella splendens Hampson, 1900; Oeonistis entella ceramensis Hampson, 1900

= Oeonistis entella =

Species of moth

Oeonistis entella, the lichen moth, is a moth of the family Erebidae. It was described by Pieter Cramer in 1779. It is found in southern India, Myanmar and Sri Lanka.

== Gallery ==
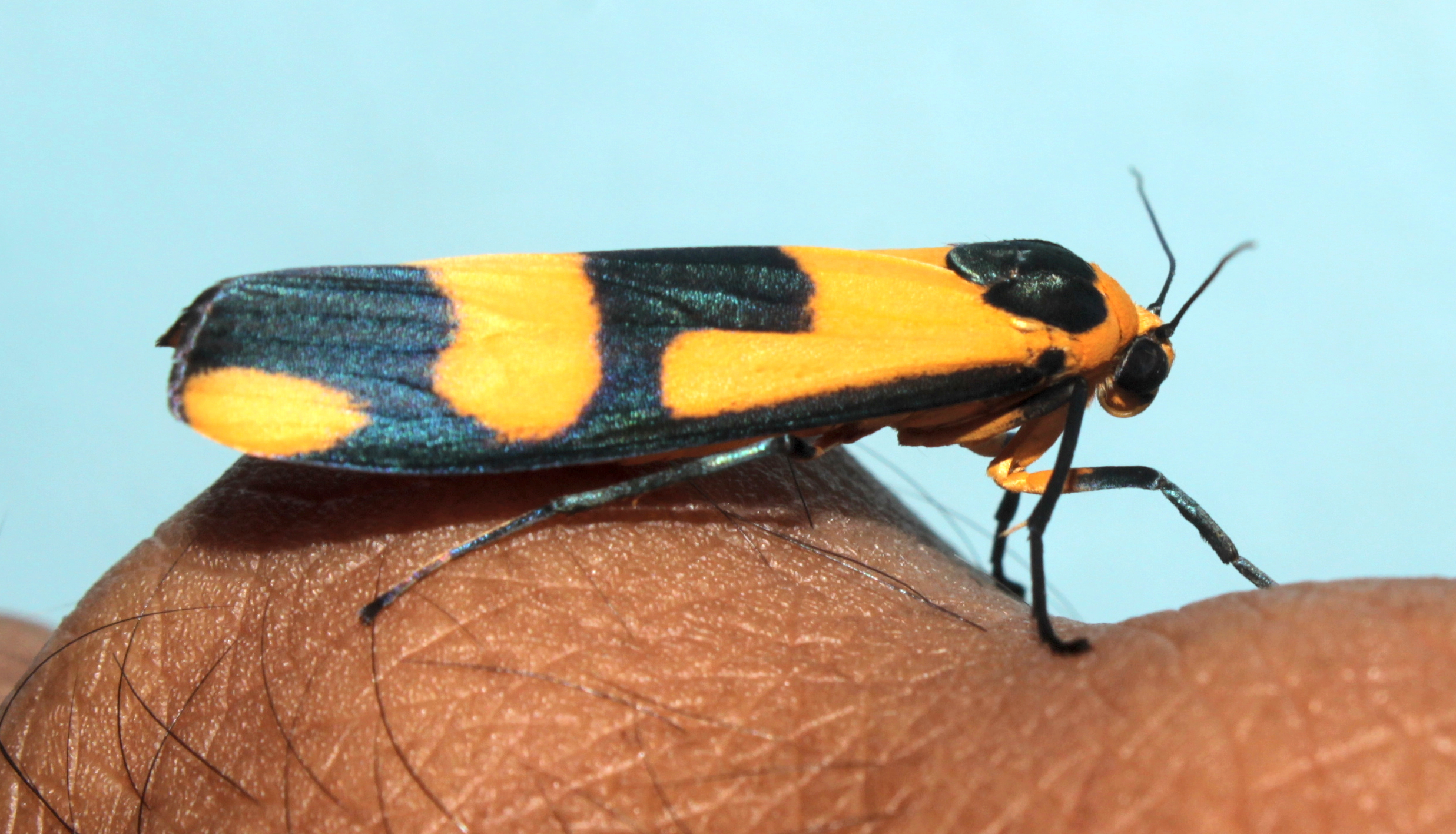
At Kanjirappally, Kerala

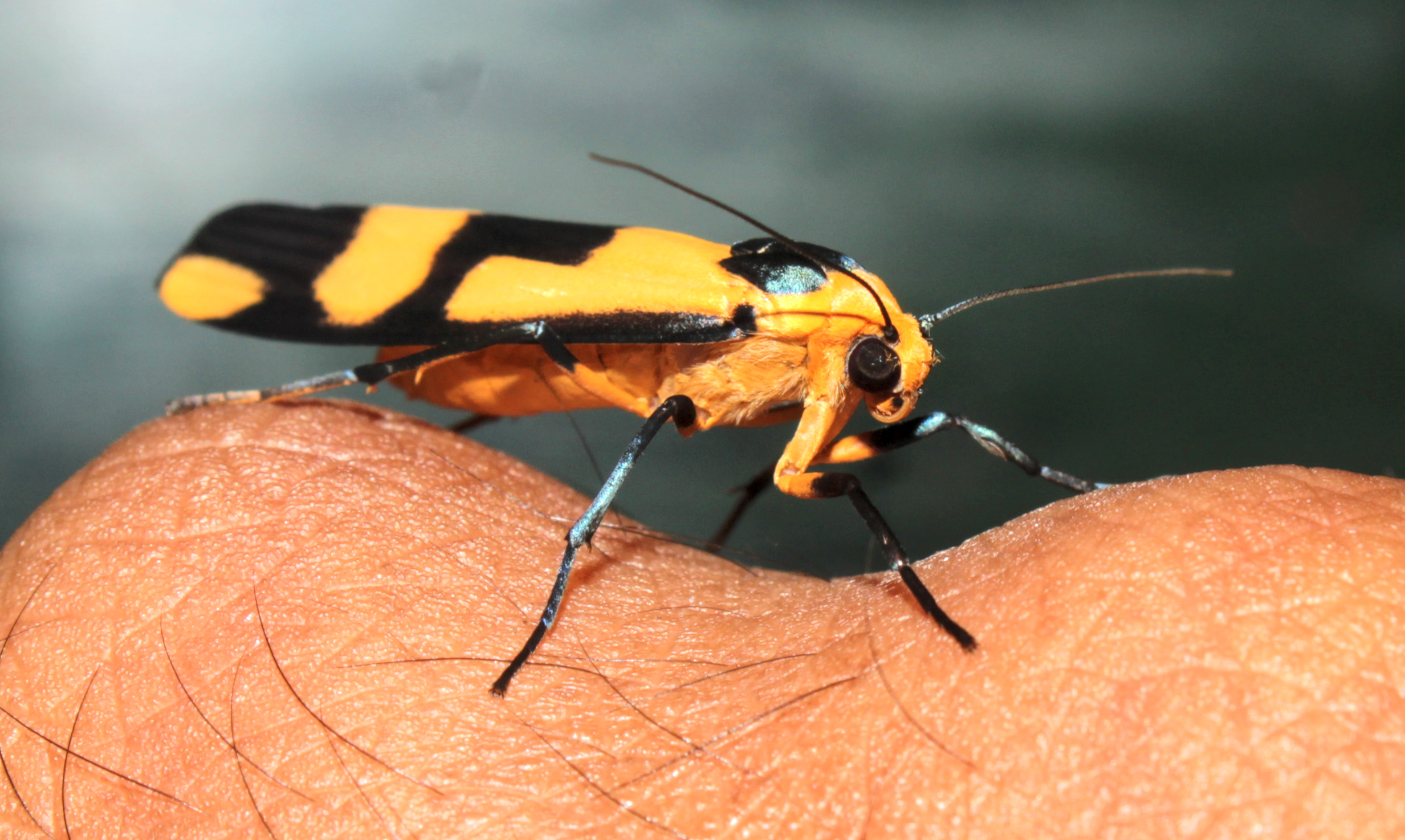
At Kanjirappally, Kerala
