= Inopsis =

Scientific classification
- Domain: Eukaryota
- Kingdom: Animalia
- Phylum: Arthropoda
- Class: Insecta
- Order: Lepidoptera
- Superfamily: Noctuoidea
- Family: Erebidae
- Subfamily: Arctiinae
- Subtribe: Lithosiina
- Genus: Inopsis; Felder, 1874

Genus of moths

Inopsis is a genus of moths in the family Erebidae. The genus was described by Felder in 1874.

== Species ==
- Inopsis catoxantha Felder, 1874
- Inopsis modulata (H. Edwards, 1884)
- Inopsis scylla (Druce, 1885)
- Inopsis metella (Druce, 1885)
- Inopsis funerea (Grote, 1883)
