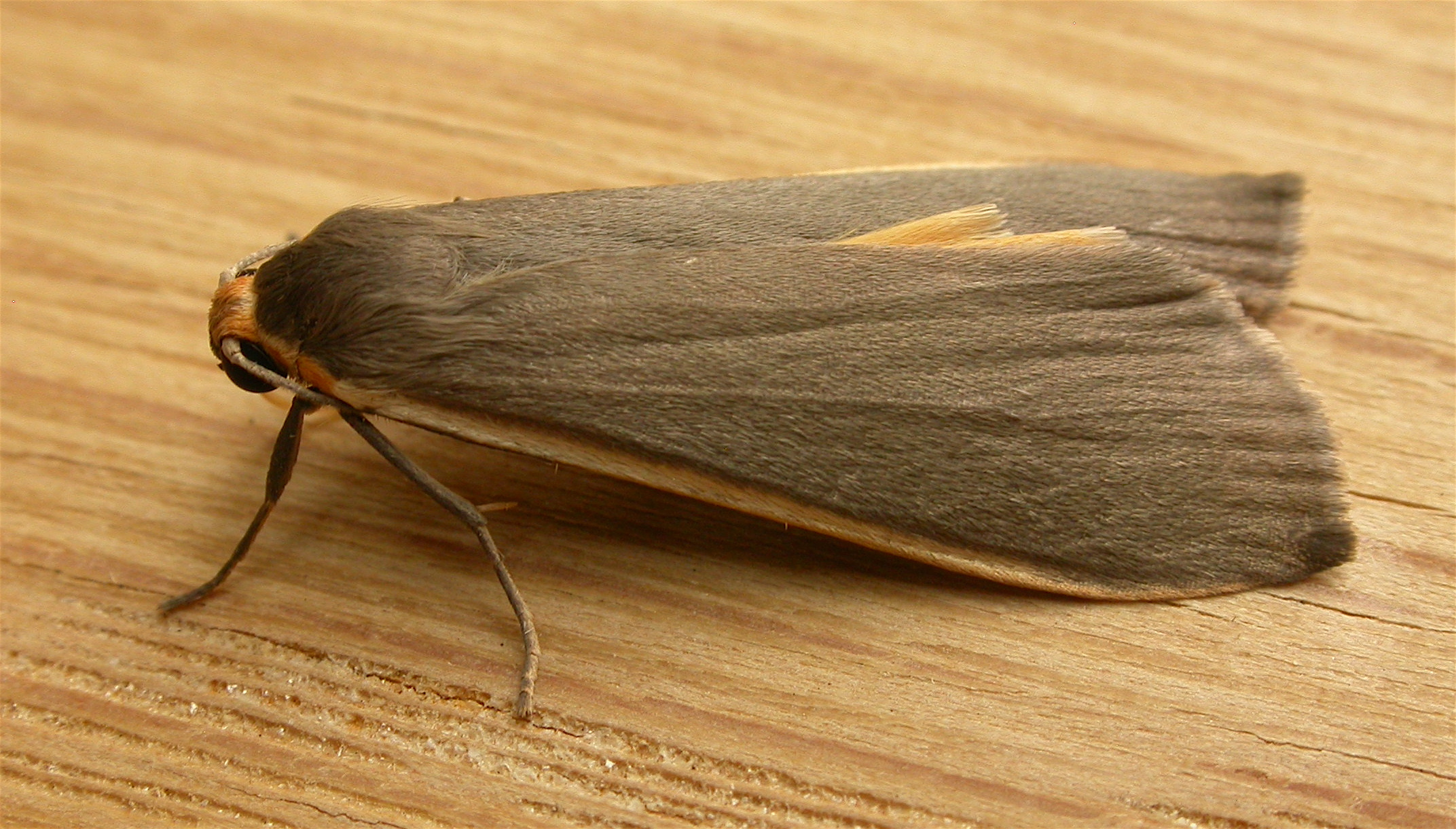
- In Australia

Scientific classification
- Kingdom: Animalia
- Phylum: Arthropoda
- Clade: Pancrustacea
- Class: Insecta
- Order: Lepidoptera
- Superfamily: Noctuoidea
- Family: Erebidae
- Subfamily: Arctiinae
- Genus: Palaeosia; Hampson, 1900
- Species: P. bicosta

Binomial name
- Palaeosia bicosta Walker, 1854

Synonyms
- Lithosia fraterna

= Palaeosia =

Genus of moths

Palaeosia is a monotypic genus of moths in the family Erebidae erected by George Hampson in 1900. Its only species, Palaeosia bicosta, the two-ribbed arctiid or two-ribbed footman, was first described by Francis Walker in 1854. It is found in south-eastern Australia.

The wingspan is about 30 mm.

The larvae feed on lichen.

== Former species ==
- Palaeosia longistriga, now Oeonosia longistriga (Bethune-Baker, 1908)
