= Apistosia humeralis =

Scientific classification
- Kingdom: Animalia
- Phylum: Arthropoda
- Class: Insecta
- Order: Lepidoptera
- Superfamily: Noctuoidea
- Family: Erebidae
- Subfamily: Arctiinae
- Genus: Apistosia
- Species: A. humeralis

Binomial name
- Apistosia humeralis Grote, 1867

Species of moth

Apistosia humeralis is a moth of the subfamily Arctiinae. It was described by Augustus Radcliffe Grote in 1867. It is found on Cuba.
