= Muscula muscula =

Scientific classification
- Domain: Eukaryota
- Kingdom: Animalia
- Phylum: Arthropoda
- Class: Insecta
- Order: Lepidoptera
- Superfamily: Noctuoidea
- Family: Erebidae
- Subfamily: Arctiinae
- Genus: Muscula
- Species: M. muscula

Binomial name
- Muscula muscula (Staudinger, 1899)

Synonyms
- Lithosia muscula Staudinger, 1899; Eilema muscula

Species of moth

Muscula muscula is a moth of the family Erebidae. It is found on the Dodecanese Islands and Cyprus, as well as in Turkey, Iraq and Lebanon.
