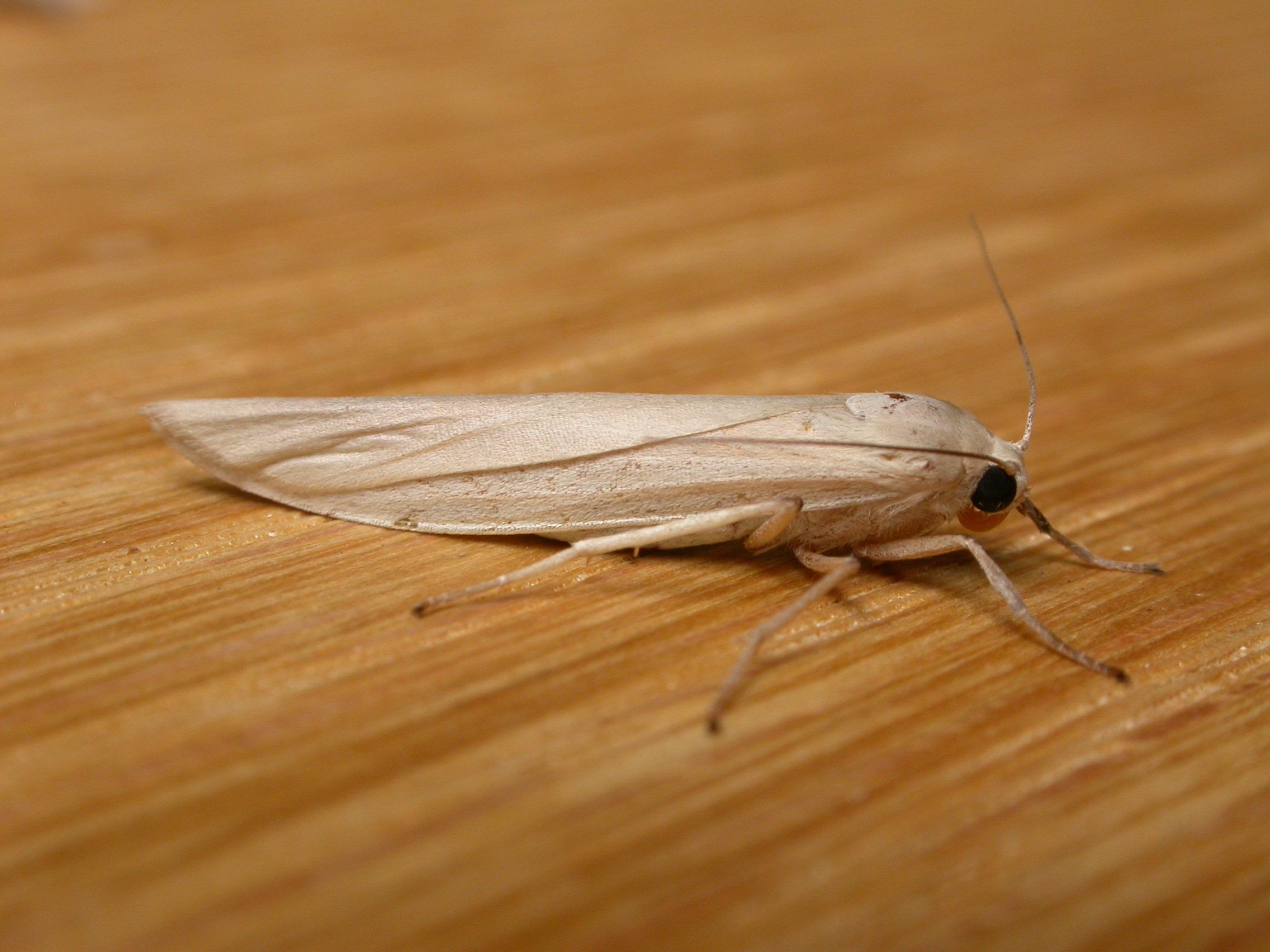

Scientific classification
- Kingdom: Animalia
- Phylum: Arthropoda
- Class: Insecta
- Order: Lepidoptera
- Superfamily: Noctuoidea
- Family: Erebidae
- Subfamily: Arctiinae
- Genus: Calamidia
- Species: C. hirta

Binomial name
- Calamidia hirta Walker, 1854

Synonyms
- Lithosia hirta Walker, 1854; Calamidia salpinctis Meyrick, 1886

= Calamidia hirta =

Species of moth

Calamidia hirta is a moth of the family Erebidae. It is found in Australia, from Queensland to Tasmania.
