= Prabhasa venosa =

Scientific classification
- Domain: Eukaryota
- Kingdom: Animalia
- Phylum: Arthropoda
- Class: Insecta
- Order: Lepidoptera
- Superfamily: Noctuoidea
- Family: Erebidae
- Subfamily: Arctiinae
- Genus: Prabhasa
- Species: P. venosa

Binomial name
- Prabhasa venosa Moore, 1878

Synonyms
- Eilema venosa; Eilema bicoloriceps Strand, 1917

Species of moth

Prabhasa venosa is a moth of the family Erebidae. It is found in eastern India (West Bengal, Sikkim, Assam), Myanmar, Thailand, China (Zhejiang, Fujian, Jiangxi, Hunan, Hubei, Sichuan, Guangdong) and Taiwan.
