= Zadadra =

Scientific classification
- Domain: Eukaryota
- Kingdom: Animalia
- Phylum: Arthropoda
- Class: Insecta
- Order: Lepidoptera
- Superfamily: Noctuoidea
- Family: Erebidae
- Subfamily: Arctiinae
- Subtribe: Lithosiina
- Genus: Zadadra; Moore, 1878

Genus of moths

Zadadra is a genus of moths in the subfamily Arctiinae.

Most species were previously placed in the genus Eilema.

== Species ==
- Zadadra costalis (Moore, 1878)
- Zadadra distorta (Moore, 1872)
- Zadadra fuscistriga (Hampson, 1894)
