= Monosyntaxis bimaculata =

Scientific classification
- Domain: Eukaryota
- Kingdom: Animalia
- Phylum: Arthropoda
- Class: Insecta
- Order: Lepidoptera
- Superfamily: Noctuoidea
- Family: Erebidae
- Subfamily: Arctiinae
- Genus: Monosyntaxis
- Species: M. bimaculata

Binomial name
- Monosyntaxis bimaculata De Vos, 2009

Species of moth

Monosyntaxis bimaculata is a moth of the family Erebidae. It was described by Rob de Vos in 2009. It is found in New Guinea, where it has only been recorded from the Foja Mountains.
