= Zadadra fuscistriga =

Scientific classification
- Kingdom: Animalia
- Phylum: Arthropoda
- Class: Insecta
- Order: Lepidoptera
- Superfamily: Noctuoidea
- Family: Erebidae
- Subfamily: Arctiinae
- Genus: Zadadra
- Species: Z. fuscistriga

Binomial name
- Zadadra fuscistriga (Hampson, 1894)

Synonyms
- Prabhasa fuscistriga Hampson, 1894; Eilema fuscistriga

Species of moth

Zadadra fuscistriga is a moth of the subfamily Arctiinae. It is found in Myanmar and Assam, India.
