= Oeonosia =

Scientific classification
- Kingdom: Animalia
- Phylum: Arthropoda
- Clade: Pancrustacea
- Class: Insecta
- Order: Lepidoptera
- Superfamily: Noctuoidea
- Family: Erebidae
- Subfamily: Arctiinae
- Subtribe: Lithosiina
- Genus: Oeonosia; Hampson, 1914

Genus of moths

Oeonosia is a genus of moths in the family Erebidae described by George Hampson in 1914.

== Species ==
- Oeonosia abenaho De Vos, 2012 (from New Guinea)
- Oeonosia aurifera Rothschild, 1912
- Oeonosia cruda De Vos, 2012 (from New Guinea)
- Oeonosia longistriga (Bethune-Baker, 1908)
- Oeonosia lorentz De Vos, 2020 (from New Guinea)
- Oeonosia pectinata de Vos, 2007 (from New Guinea)
