= Graphosia phaeocraspis =

Scientific classification
- Domain: Eukaryota
- Kingdom: Animalia
- Phylum: Arthropoda
- Class: Insecta
- Order: Lepidoptera
- Superfamily: Noctuoidea
- Family: Erebidae
- Subfamily: Arctiinae
- Genus: Graphosia
- Species: G. phaeocraspis

Binomial name
- Graphosia phaeocraspis Bethune-Baker, 1908

Synonyms
- Tigrioides lactea Rothschild, 1912; Tigrioides margaritacea Rothschild, 1912

Species of moth

Graphosia phaeocraspis is a moth of the family Erebidae. It was described by George Thomas Bethune-Baker in 1908. It is found in New Guinea.
