= Chrysoscota vagivitta =

Scientific classification
- Kingdom: Animalia
- Phylum: Arthropoda
- Class: Insecta
- Order: Lepidoptera
- Superfamily: Noctuoidea
- Family: Erebidae
- Subfamily: Arctiinae
- Genus: Chrysoscota
- Species: C. vagivitta

Binomial name
- Chrysoscota vagivitta (Walker, 1866)

Synonyms
- Lithosia vagivitta Walker, 1866; Chrysoscota lacteiplaga Rothschild, 1912

Species of moth

Chrysoscota vagivitta is a moth of the family Erebidae. It was described by Francis Walker in 1866. It is found on Misool, Seram and New Guinea.
