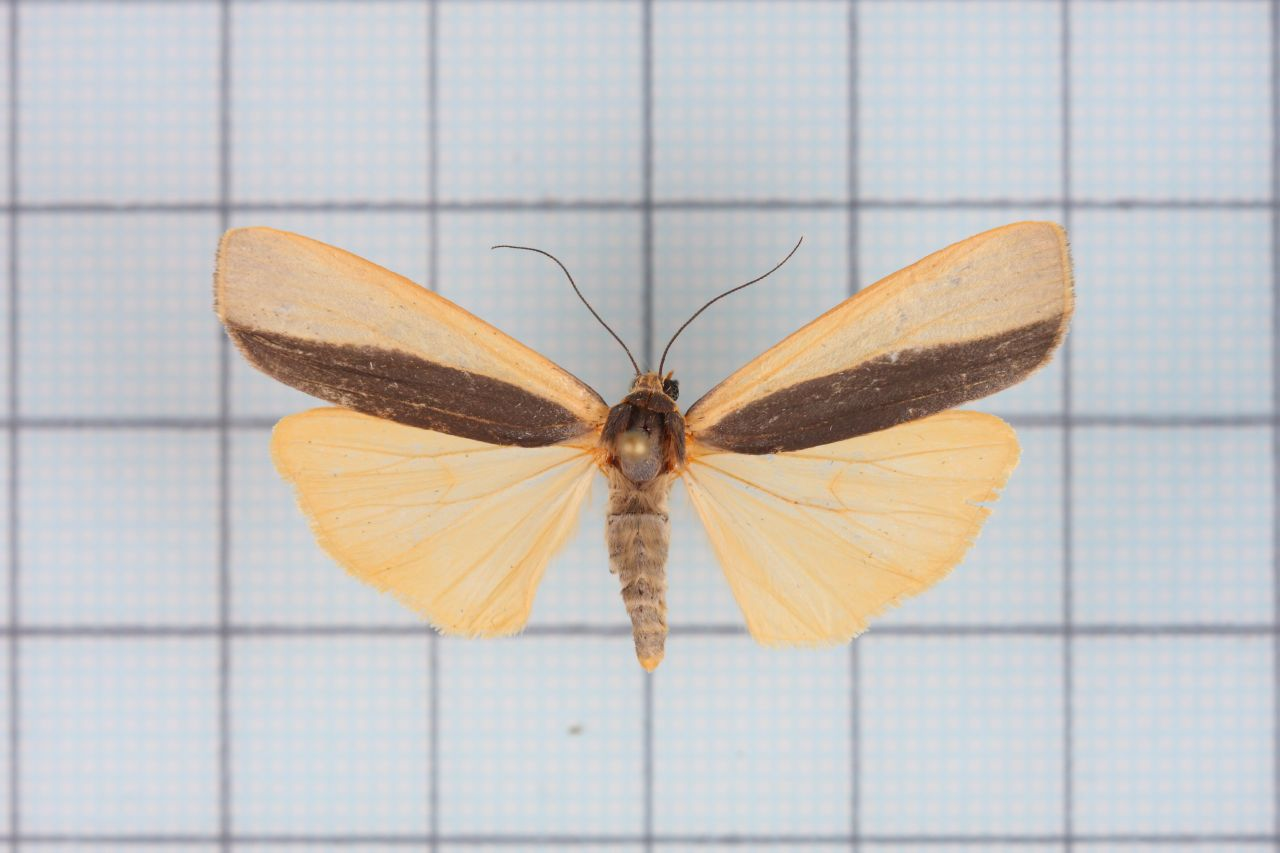

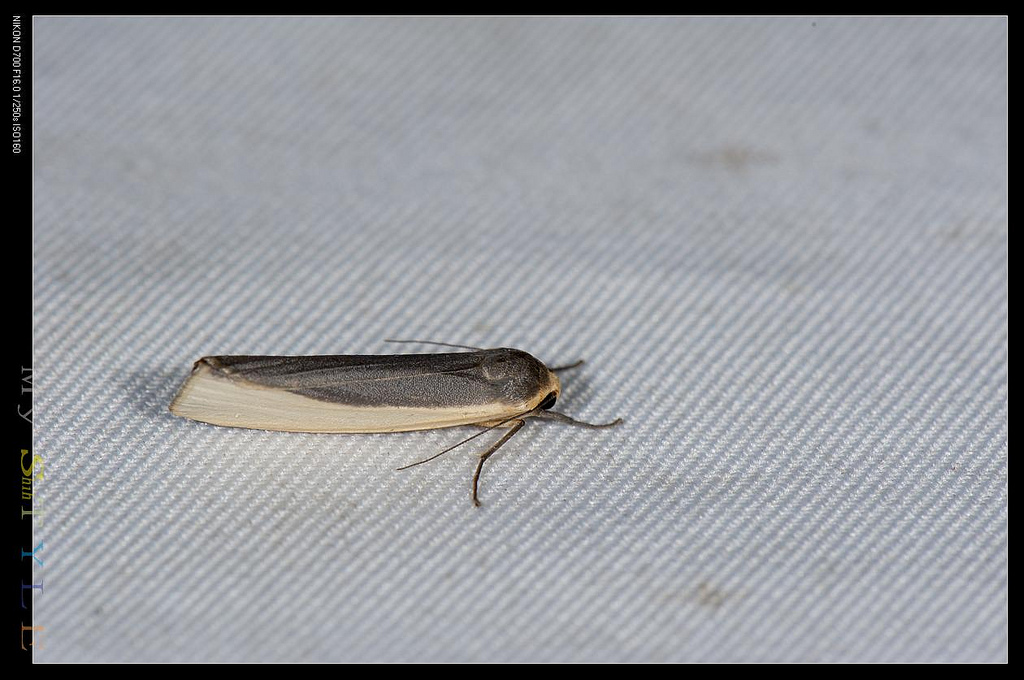

Scientific classification
- Domain: Eukaryota
- Kingdom: Animalia
- Phylum: Arthropoda
- Class: Insecta
- Order: Lepidoptera
- Superfamily: Noctuoidea
- Family: Erebidae
- Subfamily: Arctiinae
- Genus: Hesudra
- Species: H. divisa

Binomial name
- Hesudra divisa Moore, 1878

Synonyms
- Agylla divisa

= Hesudra divisa =

Species of moth

Hesudra divisa is a moth in the family Erebidae. It is found in the Himalaya, Taiwan and Borneo.

The wingspan is 33–53 mm. Adults are on wing in March and May.
