= Apistosia =

Scientific classification
- Kingdom: Animalia
- Phylum: Arthropoda
- Clade: Pancrustacea
- Class: Insecta
- Order: Lepidoptera
- Superfamily: Noctuoidea
- Family: Erebidae
- Subfamily: Arctiinae
- Tribe: Lithosiini
- Genus: Apistosia; Hübner, [1823]

Genus of moths

Apistosia is a genus of moths in the subfamily Arctiinae. The genus was erected by Jacob Hübner in 1823.

== Species ==
- Apistosia humeralis Grote, 1867
- Apistosia judas Hübner, 1827
- Apistosia phaeoleuca Dognin, 1899
- Apistosia pogonoprocta Dognin, 1899
- Apistosia tenebrosa H. Druce, 1885

== Former species ==
- Apistosia chionora Meyrick, 1886
- Apistosia subnigra Leech, 1899
