= Apaidia barbarica =

Scientific classification
- Domain: Eukaryota
- Kingdom: Animalia
- Phylum: Arthropoda
- Class: Insecta
- Order: Lepidoptera
- Superfamily: Noctuoidea
- Family: Erebidae
- Subfamily: Arctiinae
- Genus: Apaidia
- Species: A. barbarica

Binomial name
- Apaidia barbarica Legrand, 1939

Species of moth

Apaidia barbarica is a moth of the family Erebidae first described by Henry Legrand in 1939. It is found in Italy.
