= Prabhasa monastyrskii =

Scientific classification
- Domain: Eukaryota
- Kingdom: Animalia
- Phylum: Arthropoda
- Class: Insecta
- Order: Lepidoptera
- Superfamily: Noctuoidea
- Family: Erebidae
- Subfamily: Arctiinae
- Genus: Prabhasa
- Species: P. monastyrskii

Binomial name
- Prabhasa monastyrskii Dubatolov, 2012

Species of moth

Prabhasa monastyrskii is a moth of the family Erebidae first described by Vladimir Viktorovitch Dubatolov in 2012. It is found in Vietnam.

The length of the forewings is about 9.5 mm.
