= Monosyntaxis montanus =

Scientific classification
- Domain: Eukaryota
- Kingdom: Animalia
- Phylum: Arthropoda
- Class: Insecta
- Order: Lepidoptera
- Superfamily: Noctuoidea
- Family: Erebidae
- Subfamily: Arctiinae
- Genus: Monosyntaxis
- Species: M. montanus

Binomial name
- Monosyntaxis montanus Schulze, 1910

Species of moth

Monosyntaxis montanus is a moth of the family Erebidae. It was described by Schulze in 1910. It is found on Luzon in the Philippines.
