= Mithuna quadriplaga =

Scientific classification
- Domain: Eukaryota
- Kingdom: Animalia
- Phylum: Arthropoda
- Class: Insecta
- Order: Lepidoptera
- Superfamily: Noctuoidea
- Family: Erebidae
- Subfamily: Arctiinae
- Genus: Mithuna
- Species: M. quadriplaga

Binomial name
- Mithuna quadriplaga Moore, 1878

Species of moth

Mithuna quadriplaga is a moth in the subfamily Arctiinae first described by Frederic Moore in 1878. It is found in Bhutan and the Indian state of Sikkim.
