= Graphosia lophopyga =

Scientific classification
- Domain: Eukaryota
- Kingdom: Animalia
- Phylum: Arthropoda
- Class: Insecta
- Order: Lepidoptera
- Superfamily: Noctuoidea
- Family: Erebidae
- Subfamily: Arctiinae
- Genus: Graphosia
- Species: G. lophopyga

Binomial name
- Graphosia lophopyga (Turner, 1940)

Synonyms
- Scoliacma lophopyga Turner, 1940

Species of moth

Graphosia lophopyga is a moth of the family Erebidae. It was described by Alfred Jefferis Turner in 1940. It is found in Australia.
