= Lambulodes brunneomarginata =

Scientific classification
- Domain: Eukaryota
- Kingdom: Animalia
- Phylum: Arthropoda
- Class: Insecta
- Order: Lepidoptera
- Superfamily: Noctuoidea
- Family: Erebidae
- Subfamily: Arctiinae
- Genus: Lambulodes
- Species: L. brunneomarginata

Binomial name
- Lambulodes brunneomarginata (Rothschild, 1912)

Synonyms
- Lambula brunneomarginata Rothschild, 1912

Species of moth

Lambulodes brunneomarginata is a moth of the family Erebidae. It was described by Walter Rothschild in 1912. It is found in New Guinea, where it has been recorded from Waigeo and on mainland New Guinea. The habitat consists of mountainous areas.
