= Lambulodes sericea =

Scientific classification
- Domain: Eukaryota
- Kingdom: Animalia
- Phylum: Arthropoda
- Class: Insecta
- Order: Lepidoptera
- Superfamily: Noctuoidea
- Family: Erebidae
- Subfamily: Arctiinae
- Genus: Lambulodes
- Species: L. sericea

Binomial name
- Lambulodes sericea (Rothschild, 1912)

Synonyms
- Lambula sericea Rothschild, 1912; Lambula bimaculata Rothschild, 1912; Lambula sericeoides Rothschild, 1912

Species of moth

Lambulodes sericea is a moth of the family Erebidae. It was described by Walter Rothschild in 1912. It is found in Papua New Guinea and it is also found on Mount Goliath in Papua.
