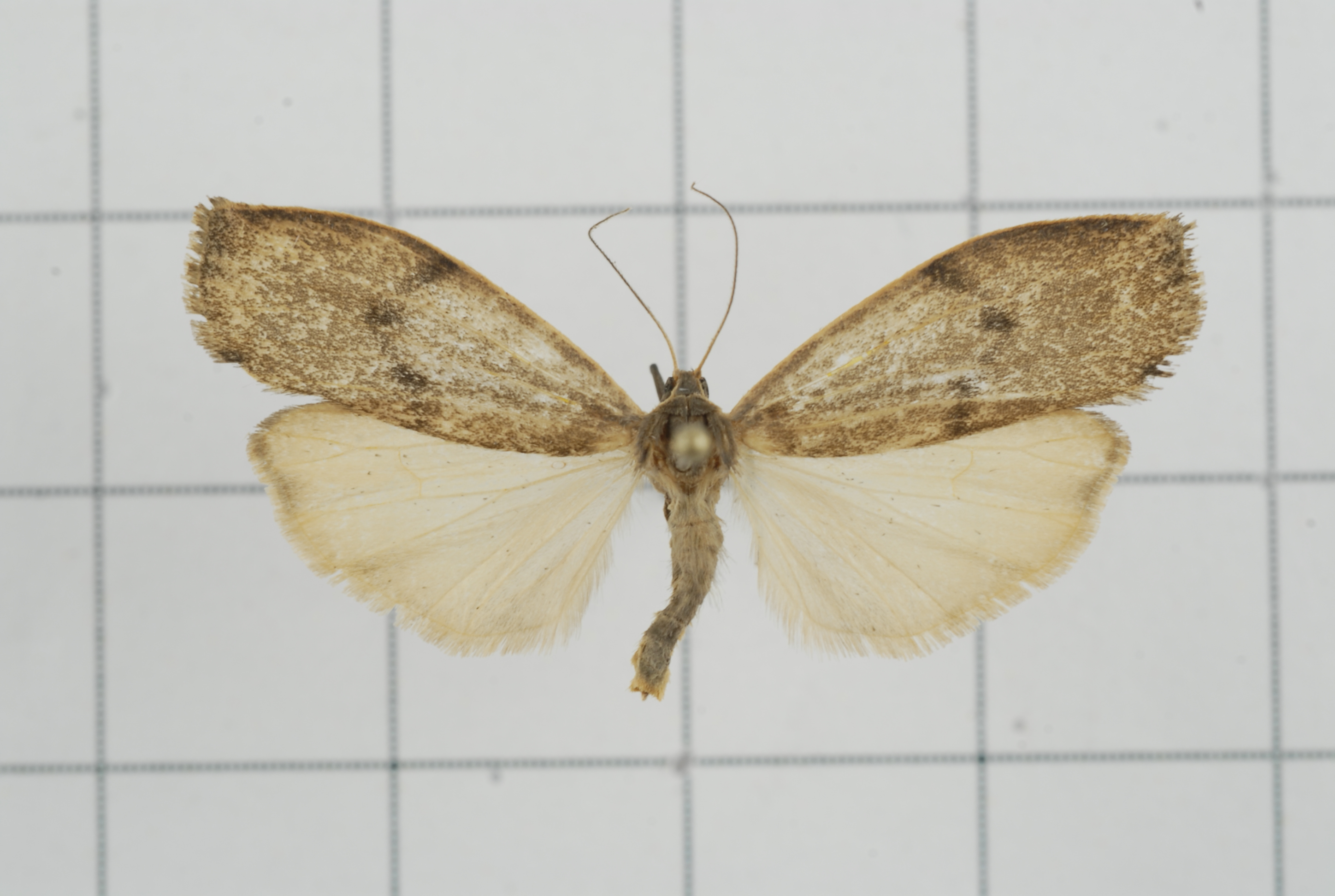
- Gampola fasciata

Scientific classification
- Domain: Eukaryota
- Kingdom: Animalia
- Phylum: Arthropoda
- Class: Insecta
- Order: Lepidoptera
- Superfamily: Noctuoidea
- Family: Erebidae
- Subfamily: Arctiinae
- Genus: Gampola
- Species: G. fasciata

Binomial name
- Gampola fasciata Moore, 1878

= Gampola fasciata =

Species of moth

Gampola fasciata is a moth of the family Erebidae, described by Frederic Moore in 1878 from Sri Lanka.

== Description ==
The male's wingspan is about 28 mm and the female's 34 mm. Male has brownish fuscous and anal tuft ochreous. Costa and forewing apex is ochreous. Hindwings pale. Female has indistinct angled fuscous band just beyond the middle of forewing. Some dark marks appear on the outer margin.
