= Euconosia xylinoides =

Scientific classification
- Kingdom: Animalia
- Phylum: Arthropoda
- Class: Insecta
- Order: Lepidoptera
- Superfamily: Noctuoidea
- Family: Erebidae
- Subfamily: Arctiinae
- Genus: Euconosia
- Species: E. xylinoides

Binomial name
- Euconosia xylinoides (Walker, 1862)

Synonyms
- Lithosia xylinoides Walker, 1862

Species of moth

Euconosia xylinoides is a moth of the subfamily Arctiinae first described by Francis Walker in 1862. It is found on Borneo. The habitat consists of wet and dry heath forests.
