= Gandhara (moth) =

Scientific classification
- Domain: Eukaryota
- Kingdom: Animalia
- Phylum: Arthropoda
- Class: Insecta
- Order: Lepidoptera
- Superfamily: Noctuoidea
- Family: Erebidae
- Subfamily: Arctiinae
- Subtribe: Lithosiina
- Genus: Gandhara; Moore, 1878

Genus of moths

Gandhara is a genus of moths in the subfamily Arctiinae. The genus was erected by Frederic Moore in 1878.

Most species were previously placed in the genus Eilema.

== Species ==
- Gandhara serva (Walker, 1854)
- Gandhara vietnamica Dubatolov, 2012
