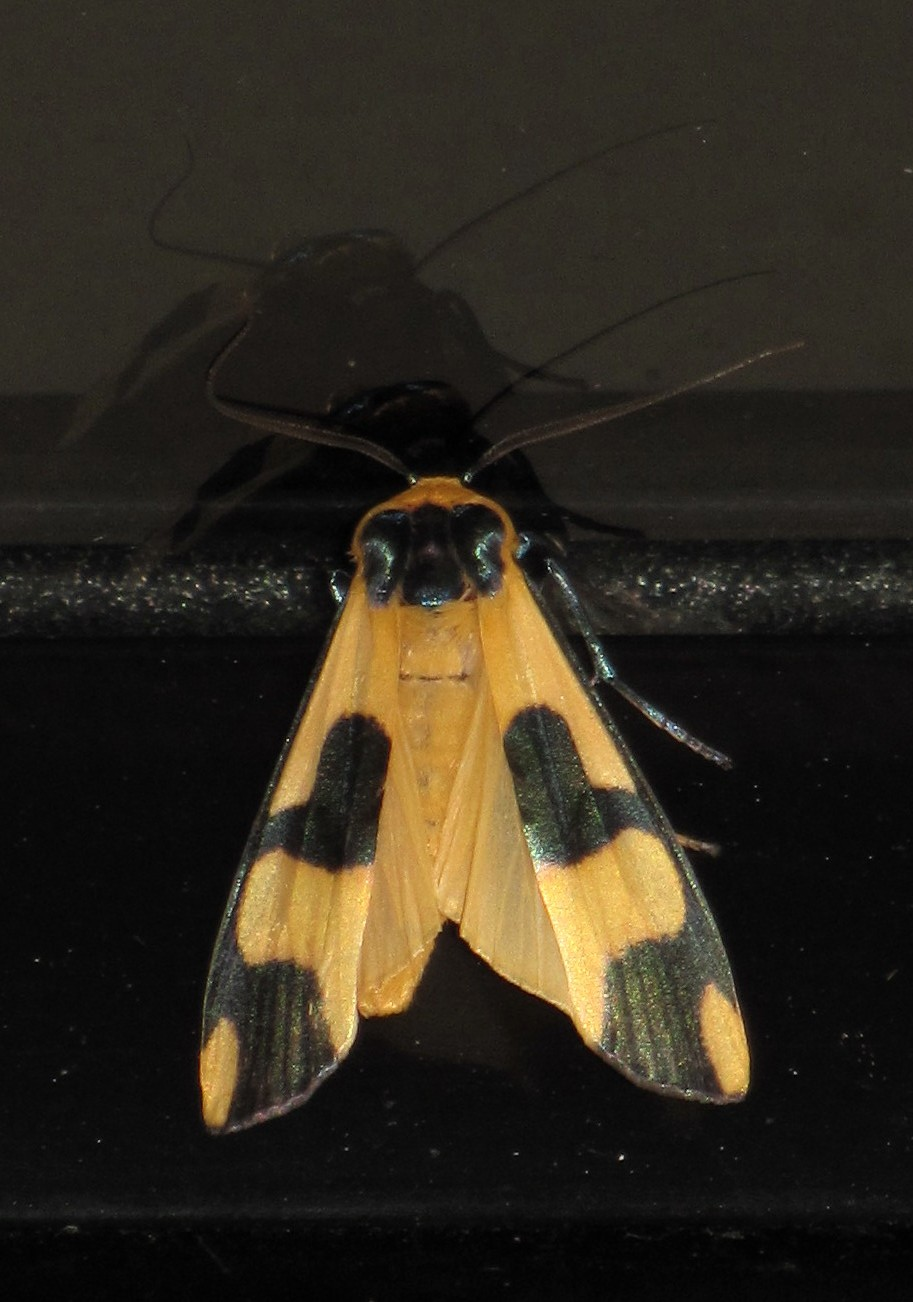

Scientific classification
- Kingdom: Animalia
- Phylum: Arthropoda
- Class: Insecta
- Order: Lepidoptera
- Superfamily: Noctuoidea
- Family: Erebidae
- Subfamily: Arctiinae
- Genus: Oeonistis
- Species: O. altica

Binomial name
- Oeonistis altica (Linnaeus, 1768)

Synonyms
- Phalaena altica Linnaeus, 1768; Phalaena altica Linnaeus, 1769; Oeonistis imitaria Orhant, 2000

= Oeonistis altica =

Species of moth

Oeonistis altica is a moth of the family Erebidae first described by Carl Linnaeus in 1768. It is found in south-east Asia, including China, Hong Kong, Laos, Vietnam, Indonesia, northern India, the Philippines, Taiwan as well as the Australian state of Queensland.
