= Hesudra mjobergi =

Scientific classification
- Domain: Eukaryota
- Kingdom: Animalia
- Phylum: Arthropoda
- Class: Insecta
- Order: Lepidoptera
- Superfamily: Noctuoidea
- Family: Erebidae
- Subfamily: Arctiinae
- Genus: Hesudra
- Species: H. mjobergi

Binomial name
- Hesudra mjobergi (Talbot, 1926)

Synonyms
- Agylla mjobergi Talbot, 1926

Species of moth

Hesudra mjobergi is a moth of the family Erebidae. It was described by George Talbot in 1926. It is found on Borneo, Sulawesi and Seram.
