= Apistosia tenebrosa =

Scientific classification
- Kingdom: Animalia
- Phylum: Arthropoda
- Class: Insecta
- Order: Lepidoptera
- Superfamily: Noctuoidea
- Family: Erebidae
- Subfamily: Arctiinae
- Genus: Apistosia
- Species: A. tenebrosa

Binomial name
- Apistosia tenebrosa H. Druce, 1885

Species of moth

Apistosia tenebrosa is a moth of the subfamily Arctiinae. It was described by Herbert Druce in 1885. It is found in Mexico.
