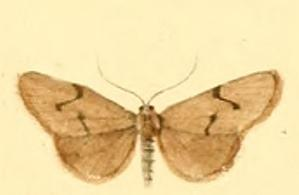
- Apaidia mesogona

Scientific classification
- Kingdom: Animalia
- Phylum: Arthropoda
- Class: Insecta
- Order: Lepidoptera
- Superfamily: Noctuoidea
- Family: Erebidae
- Subfamily: Arctiinae
- Subtribe: Lithosiina
- Genus: Apaidia; Hampson, 1900

= Apaidia =

Genus of moths

Apaidia is a genus of moths in the subfamily Arctiinae. The genus was erected by George Hampson in 1900.

== Species ==
- Apaidia barbarica Legrand, 1939
- Apaidia mesogona (Godart, 1822)
- Apaidia rufeola (Rambur, 1832)
