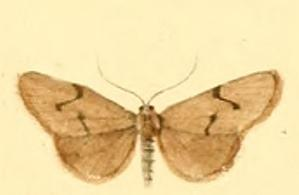

Scientific classification
- Domain: Eukaryota
- Kingdom: Animalia
- Phylum: Arthropoda
- Class: Insecta
- Order: Lepidoptera
- Superfamily: Noctuoidea
- Family: Erebidae
- Subfamily: Arctiinae
- Genus: Apaidia
- Species: A. mesogona

Binomial name
- Apaidia mesogona (Godart, [1824])

Synonyms
- Callimorpha mesogona Godart, [1824]; Apaidia mesogona ab. griseata Legrand, 1938; Apaidia mesogona ab. lucasi Legrand, 1938

= Apaidia mesogona =

Species of moth

Apaidia mesogona is a moth of the family Erebidae first described by Jean Baptiste Godart in 1824. It is found in Western Europe, Sardinia, Corsica and North Africa.

The larvae feed on Quercus suber, Thymus, Buxus sempervirens and Lavandula species.
