= Tylanthes =

Scientific classification
- Kingdom: Animalia
- Phylum: Arthropoda
- Class: Insecta
- Order: Lepidoptera
- Superfamily: Noctuoidea
- Family: Erebidae
- Subfamily: Arctiinae
- Subtribe: Lithosiina
- Genus: Tylanthes; Meyrick, 1889
- Species: T. ptochias

Binomial name
- Tylanthes ptochias Meyrick, 1889

Synonyms
- Nishada louisiadensis Rothschild, 1913

Genus of moths

Tylanthes is a monotypic moth genus in the subfamily Arctiinae. Its only species, Tylanthes ptochias, is found in Australia and New Guinea. It is found in both lowland and highland habitats. Both the genus and species were first described by Edward Meyrick in 1889.
