= Inopsis modulata =

Scientific classification
- Domain: Eukaryota
- Kingdom: Animalia
- Phylum: Arthropoda
- Class: Insecta
- Order: Lepidoptera
- Superfamily: Noctuoidea
- Family: Erebidae
- Subfamily: Arctiinae
- Genus: Inopsis
- Species: I. modulata

Binomial name
- Inopsis modulata (H. Edwards, 1884)

Synonyms
- Ctenucha modulata H. Edwards, 1884

Species of moth

Inopsis modulata is a moth of the family Erebidae. It was described by Henry Edwards in 1884. It is found in Mexico, Arizona and New Mexico.

The wingspan is about 38 mm. The head, collar and lower side of the abdomen are orange.
