= Hesudra haighti =

Scientific classification
- Domain: Eukaryota
- Kingdom: Animalia
- Phylum: Arthropoda
- Class: Insecta
- Order: Lepidoptera
- Superfamily: Noctuoidea
- Family: Erebidae
- Subfamily: Arctiinae
- Genus: Hesudra
- Species: H. haighti

Binomial name
- Hesudra haighti (Wileman & South, 1919)

Synonyms
- Agylla haighti Wileman & South, 1919

Species of moth

Hesudra haighti is a moth of the family Erebidae. It was described by Wileman and South in 1919. It is found on Luzon in the Philippines.
