= Chrysoscota =

Scientific classification
- Kingdom: Animalia
- Phylum: Arthropoda
- Class: Insecta
- Order: Lepidoptera
- Superfamily: Noctuoidea
- Family: Erebidae
- Subfamily: Arctiinae
- Subtribe: Lithosiina
- Genus: Chrysoscota; Hampson, 1900

Genus of moths

Chrysoscota is a genus of moths in the family Erebidae. The genus was erected by George Hampson in 1900.

== Species ==
- Chrysoscota albomaculata Rothschild, 1912
- Chrysoscota auranticeps Hampson, 1900
- Chrysoscota brunnea (Swinhoe, 1905)
- Chrysoscota conjuncta Rothschild, 1912
- Chrysoscota cotriangulata Holloway, 2001
- Chrysoscota flavostrigata Bethune-Baker, 1904
- Chrysoscota tanyphara Turner, 1940
- Chrysoscota vagivitta Walker, 1866
