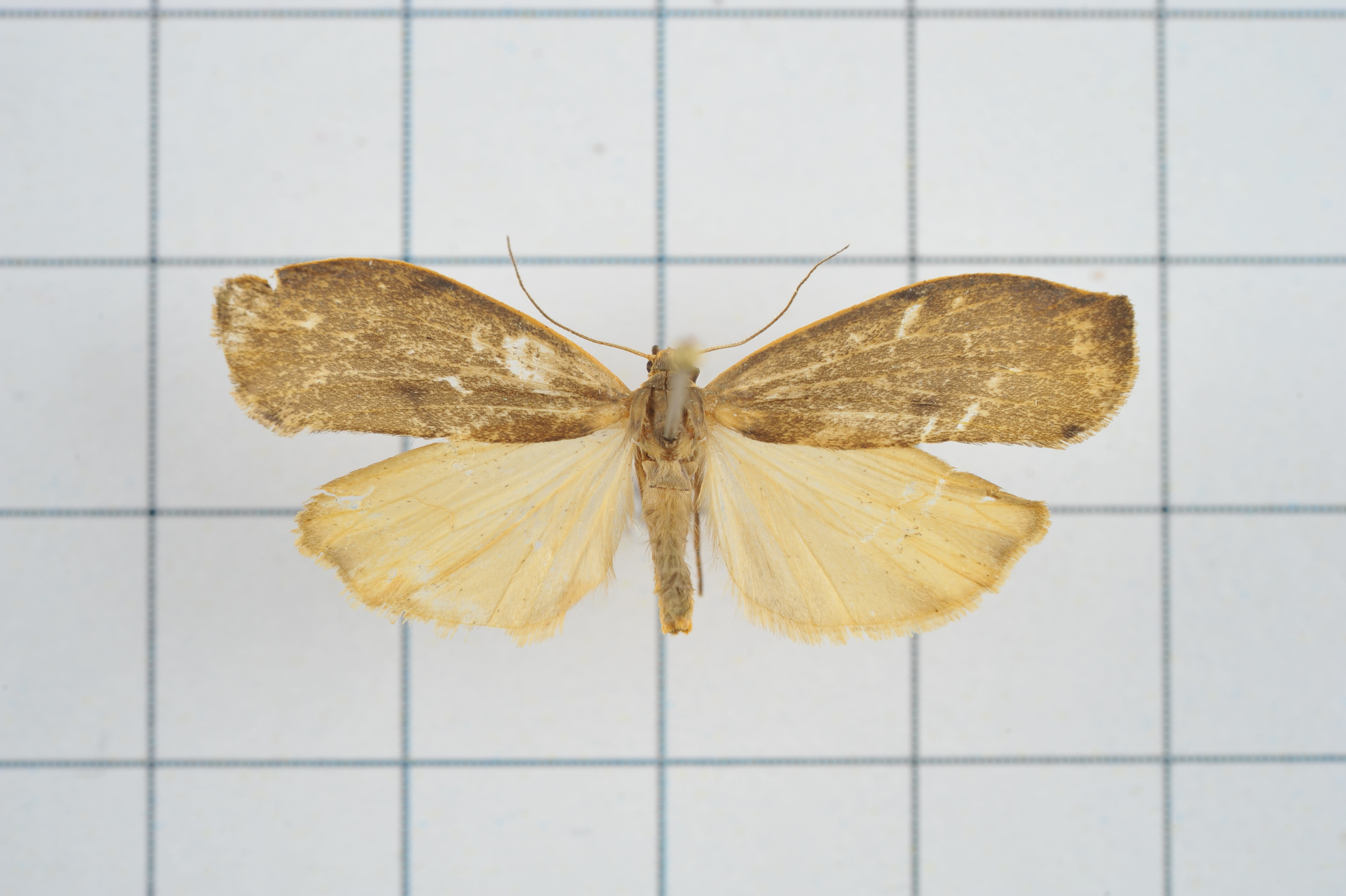

Scientific classification
- Kingdom: Animalia
- Phylum: Arthropoda
- Clade: Pancrustacea
- Class: Insecta
- Order: Lepidoptera
- Superfamily: Noctuoidea
- Family: Erebidae
- Subfamily: Arctiinae
- Genus: Gampola
- Species: G. sinica

Binomial name
- Gampola sinica Dubatolov, Kishida & Wang, 2012

= Gampola sinica =

Species of moth

Gampola sinica is a moth of the family Erebidae. It is predominantly found in Thailand and China (Guangdong, Hong Kong).

The length of the forewings is about 14 mm.
