= Chrysoscota tanyphara =

Scientific classification
- Domain: Eukaryota
- Kingdom: Animalia
- Phylum: Arthropoda
- Class: Insecta
- Order: Lepidoptera
- Superfamily: Noctuoidea
- Family: Erebidae
- Subfamily: Arctiinae
- Genus: Chrysoscota
- Species: C. tanyphara

Binomial name
- Chrysoscota tanyphara Turner, 1940

Species of moth

Chrysoscota tanyphara is a moth of the family Erebidae first described by Alfred Jefferis Turner in 1940. It is found in Australia. The habitat consists of rainforests.

The larvae probably feeds on lichens.
