= Monosyntaxis trimaculata =

Scientific classification
- Kingdom: Animalia
- Phylum: Arthropoda
- Class: Insecta
- Order: Lepidoptera
- Superfamily: Noctuoidea
- Family: Erebidae
- Subfamily: Arctiinae
- Genus: Monosyntaxis
- Species: M. trimaculata

Binomial name
- Monosyntaxis trimaculata (Hampson, 1900)

Synonyms
- Monotaxis trimaculata Hampson, 1900

Species of moth

Monosyntaxis trimaculata is a moth of the family Erebidae. It was described by George Hampson in 1900. It is found on Borneo. The habitat consists of upper montane forests.
