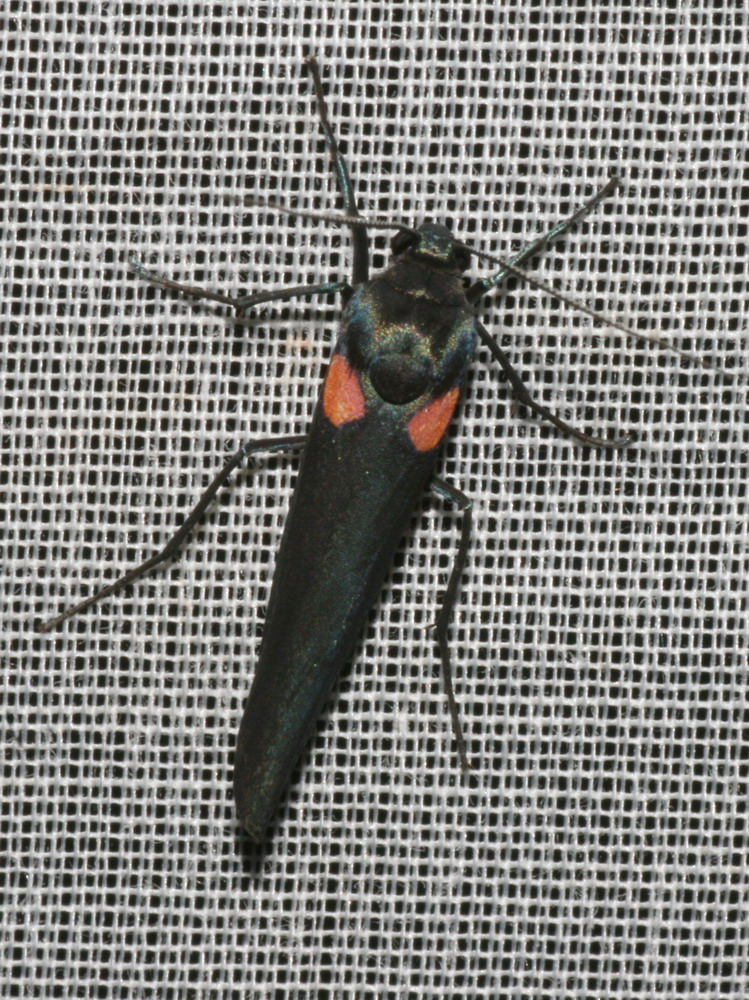
- Monosyntaxis holmanhunti, (male)

Scientific classification
- Kingdom: Animalia
- Phylum: Arthropoda
- Class: Insecta
- Order: Lepidoptera
- Superfamily: Noctuoidea
- Family: Erebidae
- Subfamily: Arctiinae
- Genus: Monosyntaxis
- Species: M. holmanhunti

Binomial name
- Monosyntaxis holmanhunti Hampson, 1914

= Monosyntaxis holmanhunti =

Species of moth

Monosyntaxis holmanhunti is a moth of the family Erebidae. It was described by George Hampson in 1914. It is found on Peninsular Malaysia, Borneo, Java and Bali.
