= Gnamptonychia =

Scientific classification
- Kingdom: Animalia
- Phylum: Arthropoda
- Clade: Pancrustacea
- Class: Insecta
- Order: Lepidoptera
- Superfamily: Noctuoidea
- Family: Erebidae
- Subfamily: Arctiinae
- Subtribe: Lithosiina
- Genus: Gnamptonychia; Hampson, 1900

Genus of moths

Gnamptonychia is a genus of moths in the family Erebidae. The genus was erected by George Hampson in 1900.

== Species ==
- Gnamptonychia ventralis Barnes & Lindsey, 1921
- Gnamptonychia flavicollis (Druce, 1885)
- Gnamptonychia orsola
- Gnamptonychia tiria
