= Monosyntaxis radiifera =

Scientific classification
- Domain: Eukaryota
- Kingdom: Animalia
- Phylum: Arthropoda
- Class: Insecta
- Order: Lepidoptera
- Superfamily: Noctuoidea
- Family: Erebidae
- Subfamily: Arctiinae
- Genus: Monosyntaxis
- Species: M. radiifera

Binomial name
- Monosyntaxis radiifera Černý, 1995

Species of moth

Monosyntaxis radiifera is a moth of the family Erebidae. It was described by Karel Černý in 1995. It is found on Mindanao in the Philippines.
