= Muscula brevifurca =

Scientific classification
- Kingdom: Animalia
- Phylum: Arthropoda
- Class: Insecta
- Order: Lepidoptera
- Superfamily: Noctuoidea
- Family: Erebidae
- Subfamily: Arctiinae
- Genus: Muscula
- Species: M. brevifurca

Binomial name
- Muscula brevifurca (Wiltshire, 1957)

Synonyms
- Lithosia brevifurca Wiltshire, 1957; Eilema brevifurca

Species of moth

Muscula brevifurca is a moth of the family Erebidae. It is found in Iraq.
