= Zadadra distorta =

Scientific classification
- Domain: Eukaryota
- Kingdom: Animalia
- Phylum: Arthropoda
- Class: Insecta
- Order: Lepidoptera
- Superfamily: Noctuoidea
- Family: Erebidae
- Subfamily: Arctiinae
- Genus: Zadadra
- Species: Z. distorta

Binomial name
- Zadadra distorta (Moore, 1872)

Synonyms
- Lithosia distorta Moore, 1872; Eilema distorta; Ilema impuncta Draudt, 1914

Species of moth

Zadadra distorta is a moth of the subfamily Arctiinae. It is found in Nepal, India (Sikkim, Assam) and Pulau Laut.
