= Gandhara serva =

Scientific classification
- Kingdom: Animalia
- Phylum: Arthropoda
- Class: Insecta
- Order: Lepidoptera
- Superfamily: Noctuoidea
- Family: Erebidae
- Subfamily: Arctiinae
- Genus: Gandhara
- Species: G. serva

Binomial name
- Gandhara serva (Walker, 1854)

Synonyms
- Lithosia serva Walker, 1854; Eilema serva

Species of moth

Gandhara serva is a moth of the family Erebidae first described by Francis Walker in 1854. It is found in the Himalayas and possibly Thailand.
