= Striosia =

Scientific classification
- Kingdom: Animalia
- Phylum: Arthropoda
- Class: Insecta
- Order: Lepidoptera
- Superfamily: Noctuoidea
- Family: Erebidae
- Subfamily: Arctiinae
- Subtribe: Lithosiina
- Genus: Striosia; Hampson, 1914
- Species: S. irrorata

Binomial name
- Striosia irrorata (Rothschild, 1912)

Synonyms
- Calamidia irrorata Rothschild, 1912

Genus of moths

Striosia is a monotypic moth genus in the subfamily Arctiinae erected by George Hampson in 1914. Its single species, Striosia irrorata, was first described by Rothschild in 1912. It is found in New Guinea, where it is known from Papua and Papua New Guinea.
