= Gardinia anopla =

Scientific classification
- Domain: Eukaryota
- Kingdom: Animalia
- Phylum: Arthropoda
- Class: Insecta
- Order: Lepidoptera
- Superfamily: Noctuoidea
- Family: Erebidae
- Subfamily: Arctiinae
- Genus: Gardinia
- Species: G. anopla

Binomial name
- Gardinia anopla Hering, 1925

Species of moth

Gardinia anopla is a moth of the family Erebidae. It was described by Hering in 1925. It is found in Arizona.

Adults have been recorded on wing from July to August.
