= Prabhasa plumbeomicans =

Scientific classification
- Kingdom: Animalia
- Phylum: Arthropoda
- Class: Insecta
- Order: Lepidoptera
- Superfamily: Noctuoidea
- Family: Erebidae
- Subfamily: Arctiinae
- Genus: Prabhasa
- Species: P. plumbeomicans

Binomial name
- Prabhasa plumbeomicans Hampson, 1894

Synonyms
- Eilema plumbeomicans; Zadadra plumbeomicans; Lithosia distorta ab. destriata Draudt, 1914

Species of moth

Prabhasa plumbeomicans is a moth of the family Erebidae. It is found in the north-eastern Himalayas and in Myanmar, as well as on Borneo.
