= Asiapistosia stigma =

Scientific classification
- Kingdom: Animalia
- Phylum: Arthropoda
- Clade: Pancrustacea
- Class: Insecta
- Order: Lepidoptera
- Superfamily: Noctuoidea
- Family: Erebidae
- Subfamily: Arctiinae
- Genus: Asiapistosia
- Species: A. stigma

Binomial name
- Asiapistosia stigma (C.-L. Fang, 2000)

Synonyms
- Eilema stigma C.-L. Fang, 2000

Species of moth

Asiapistosia stigma is a moth of the subfamily Arctiinae first described by Cheng-Lai Fang in 2000. It is found in the Chinese provinces of Sichuan, Shaanxi, Hubei and Guangdong.
