= Graphosia bilineata =

Scientific classification
- Kingdom: Animalia
- Phylum: Arthropoda
- Class: Insecta
- Order: Lepidoptera
- Superfamily: Noctuoidea
- Family: Erebidae
- Subfamily: Arctiinae
- Genus: Graphosia
- Species: G. bilineata

Binomial name
- Graphosia bilineata Hampson, 1900

Synonyms
- Mithuna dilutior Rothschild, 1912; Mithuna quadrilineata Rothschild, 1912; Graphosia reticulata Rothschild, 1912

Species of moth

Graphosia bilineata is a moth of the family Erebidae. It was described by George Hampson in 1900. It is found on New Guinea.
