= Chrysoscota conjuncta =

Scientific classification
- Domain: Eukaryota
- Kingdom: Animalia
- Phylum: Arthropoda
- Class: Insecta
- Order: Lepidoptera
- Superfamily: Noctuoidea
- Family: Erebidae
- Subfamily: Arctiinae
- Genus: Chrysoscota
- Species: C. conjuncta

Binomial name
- Chrysoscota conjuncta Rothschild, 1912

Species of moth

Chrysoscota conjuncta is a moth of the family Erebidae. It was described by Walter Rothschild in 1912. It is found in Papua New Guinea. The habitat consists of mountainous and lowland areas.
