= Monosyntaxis affinis =

Scientific classification
- Domain: Eukaryota
- Kingdom: Animalia
- Phylum: Arthropoda
- Class: Insecta
- Order: Lepidoptera
- Superfamily: Noctuoidea
- Family: Erebidae
- Subfamily: Arctiinae
- Genus: Monosyntaxis
- Species: M. affinis

Binomial name
- Monosyntaxis affinis Rothschild, 1912

Species of moth

Monosyntaxis affinis is a moth of the family Erebidae. It was described by Walter Rothschild in 1912. It is found on Peninsular Malaysia and Java.
