= Monosyntaxis persimilis =

Scientific classification
- Domain: Eukaryota
- Kingdom: Animalia
- Phylum: Arthropoda
- Class: Insecta
- Order: Lepidoptera
- Superfamily: Noctuoidea
- Family: Erebidae
- Subfamily: Arctiinae
- Genus: Monosyntaxis
- Species: M. persimilis

Binomial name
- Monosyntaxis persimilis Rothschild, 1912

Species of moth

Monosyntaxis persimilis is a moth of the family Erebidae. It was described by Walter Rothschild in 1912. It is found in New Guinea, where it is distributed in mountainous areas in the central part of the island, up to the Wandammen Mountains in the west. It is also found in Papua New Guinea.
