= Lambulodes =

Scientific classification
- Kingdom: Animalia
- Phylum: Arthropoda
- Class: Insecta
- Order: Lepidoptera
- Superfamily: Noctuoidea
- Family: Erebidae
- Subfamily: Arctiinae
- Subtribe: Lithosiina
- Genus: Lambulodes; Hampson, 1914

Genus of moths

Lambulodes is a genus of moths in the family Erebidae. The genus was erected by George Hampson in 1914.

== Species ==
- Lambulodes albiterminalis (Gaede, 1926)
- Lambulodes brunneomarginata Rothschild, 1912
- Lambulodes sericea Rothschild, 1912
