= Graphosia =

Scientific classification
- Kingdom: Animalia
- Phylum: Arthropoda
- Class: Insecta
- Order: Lepidoptera
- Superfamily: Noctuoidea
- Family: Erebidae
- Subfamily: Arctiinae
- Subtribe: Lithosiina
- Genus: Graphosia; Hampson, 1900

Synonyms
- Pseudilema Bethune-Baker, 1904

Genus of moths

Graphosia is a genus of moths in the family Erebidae. The genus was erected by George Hampson in 1900.

== Species ==
- Graphosia approximans Rothschild, 1912
- Graphosia bilineata Hampson, 1900
- Graphosia lophopyga (Turner, 1940)
- Graphosia ochracea (Bethune-Baker, 1904)
- Graphosia pachygramma Hampson, 1914
- Graphosia phaeocraspis Bethune-Baker, 1908
- Graphosia polylophota Hampson, 1914
- Graphosia stenopepla Hampson, 1914
