= Paralithosia shaowuica =

Scientific classification
- Domain: Eukaryota
- Kingdom: Animalia
- Phylum: Arthropoda
- Class: Insecta
- Order: Lepidoptera
- Superfamily: Noctuoidea
- Family: Erebidae
- Subfamily: Arctiinae
- Genus: Paralithosia
- Species: P. shaowuica

Binomial name
- Paralithosia shaowuica (Daniel, 1954)

Synonyms
- Microlithosia shaowuica Daniel, 1954

Species of moth

Paralithosia shaowuica is a moth of the family Erebidae. It was described by Franz Daniel in 1954. It is found in Fujian, China.
