= Scoliosia =

Scientific classification
- Kingdom: Animalia
- Phylum: Arthropoda
- Class: Insecta
- Order: Lepidoptera
- Superfamily: Noctuoidea
- Family: Erebidae
- Subfamily: Arctiinae
- Subtribe: Lithosiina
- Genus: Scoliosia; Hampson, 1914
- Species: S. brunnescens

Binomial name
- Scoliosia brunnescens (Rothschild, 1912)

Synonyms
- Scoliacma brunnescens Rothschild, 1912; Scoliosia brunnescens ab. debrunneata Strand, 1922

Genus of moths

Scoliosia is a monotypic moth genus in the subfamily Arctiinae erected by George Hampson in 1914. Its single species, Scoliosia brunnescens, was first described by Walter Rothschild in 1912. It is found in Papua and Papua New Guinea.
