= Gandhara vietnamica =

Scientific classification
- Domain: Eukaryota
- Kingdom: Animalia
- Phylum: Arthropoda
- Class: Insecta
- Order: Lepidoptera
- Superfamily: Noctuoidea
- Family: Erebidae
- Subfamily: Arctiinae
- Genus: Gandhara
- Species: G. vietnamica

Binomial name
- Gandhara vietnamica Dubatolov, 2012

Species of moth

Gandhara vietnamica is a moth of the family Erebidae first described by Vladimir Viktorovitch Dubatolov in 2012. It is found in Vietnam and possibly Thailand.

The length of the forewings is about 14 mm.
