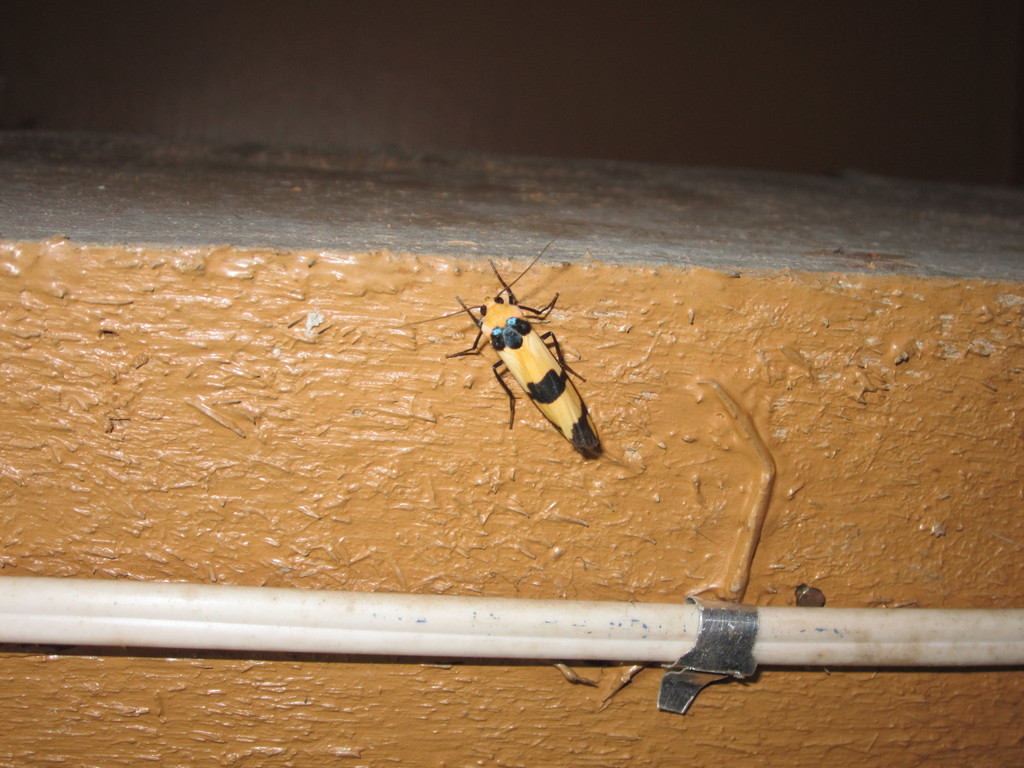

Scientific classification
- Domain: Eukaryota
- Kingdom: Animalia
- Phylum: Arthropoda
- Class: Insecta
- Order: Lepidoptera
- Superfamily: Noctuoidea
- Family: Erebidae
- Subfamily: Arctiinae
- Genus: Oeonistis
- Species: O. delia

Binomial name
- Oeonistis delia (Fabricius, 1787)

Synonyms
- Noctua delia Fabricius, 1787; Tigrioides splendens T.P.Lucas, 1890; Gnophria ceramensis Snellen von Vollenhowen, 1872; Oenistis entella braeckeli Debauche, 1938

= Oeonistis delia =

Species of moth

Oeonistis delia is a moth of the family Erebidae. It was described by Johan Christian Fabricius in 1787. It is found from Sulawesi to New Caledonia, Samoa and Tonga.
