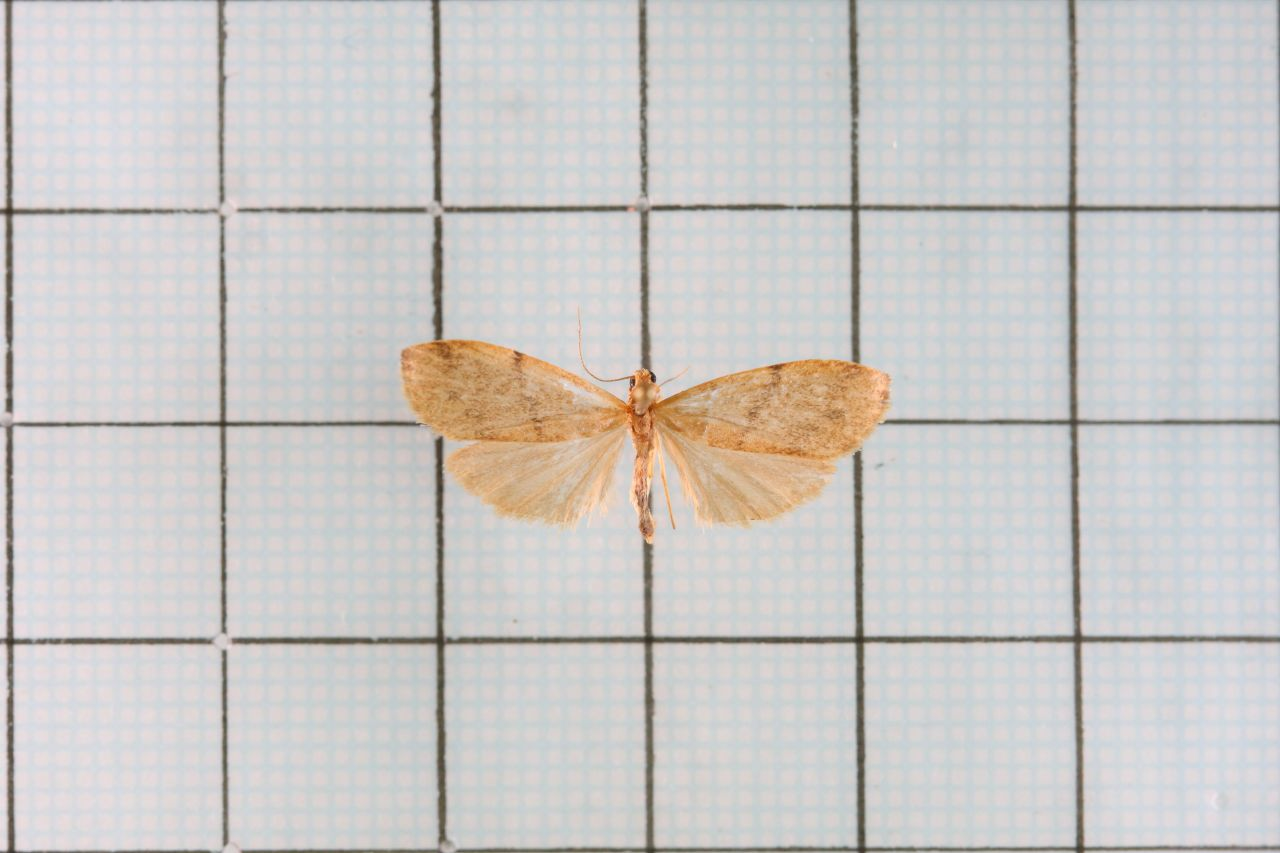

Scientific classification
- Domain: Eukaryota
- Kingdom: Animalia
- Phylum: Arthropoda
- Class: Insecta
- Order: Lepidoptera
- Superfamily: Noctuoidea
- Family: Erebidae
- Subfamily: Arctiinae
- Genus: Mithuna
- Species: M. arizana

Binomial name
- Mithuna arizana Wileman, 1911

= Mithuna arizana =

Species of moth

Mithuna arizana is a moth in the subfamily Arctiinae first described by Alfred Ernest Wileman in 1911. It is found in Taiwan.

The wingspan is 20–25 mm.
