= Euconosia aspersa =

Scientific classification
- Kingdom: Animalia
- Phylum: Arthropoda
- Class: Insecta
- Order: Lepidoptera
- Superfamily: Noctuoidea
- Family: Erebidae
- Subfamily: Arctiinae
- Genus: Euconosia
- Species: E. aspersa

Binomial name
- Euconosia aspersa (Walker, 1862)

Synonyms
- Lithosia aspersa Walker, 1862

Species of moth

Euconosia aspersa is a moth of the subfamily Arctiinae first described by Francis Walker in 1862. It is found on Borneo and Bali. The habitat consists of alluvial forests, including regenerating forests, as well as coastal forests.
