= Zadadra costalis =

Scientific classification
- Domain: Eukaryota
- Kingdom: Animalia
- Phylum: Arthropoda
- Class: Insecta
- Order: Lepidoptera
- Superfamily: Noctuoidea
- Family: Erebidae
- Subfamily: Arctiinae
- Genus: Zadadra
- Species: Z. costalis

Binomial name
- Zadadra costalis (Moore, 1878)

Synonyms
- Prabhasa costalis Moore, 1878; Eilema costalis

Species of moth

Zadadra costalis is a moth of the subfamily Arctiinae. It is found in northern China and Assam, India.
