= Monosyntaxis bipunctata =

Scientific classification
- Domain: Eukaryota
- Kingdom: Animalia
- Phylum: Arthropoda
- Class: Insecta
- Order: Lepidoptera
- Superfamily: Noctuoidea
- Family: Erebidae
- Subfamily: Arctiinae
- Genus: Monosyntaxis
- Species: M. bipunctata

Binomial name
- Monosyntaxis bipunctata (Bethune-Baker, 1904)

Synonyms
- Chrysaeglia bipunctata Bethune-Baker, 1904

Species of moth

Monosyntaxis bipunctata is a moth of the family Erebidae. It was described by George Thomas Bethune-Baker in 1904. It is found in New Guinea, where it is found in mountainous areas, particularly the Central Mountains. It is also found in Papua New Guinea.

The species is very similar to Monosyntaxis fojaensis.
