= Gardinia =

Scientific classification
- Domain: Eukaryota
- Kingdom: Animalia
- Phylum: Arthropoda
- Class: Insecta
- Order: Lepidoptera
- Superfamily: Noctuoidea
- Family: Erebidae
- Subfamily: Arctiinae
- Subtribe: Lithosiina
- Genus: Gardinia; Kirby, 1892

Synonyms
- Gardinica Strand, 1932

Genus of moths

Gardinia is a genus of moths in the family Erebidae. The genus was described by William Forsell Kirby in 1892.

== Species ==
- Gardinia amynitica Hering, 1925
- Gardinia anopla Hering, 1925
- Gardinia boliviensis Hering, 1925
- Gardinia magnifica (Walker, [1865])
- Gardinia paradoxa Hering, 1925
