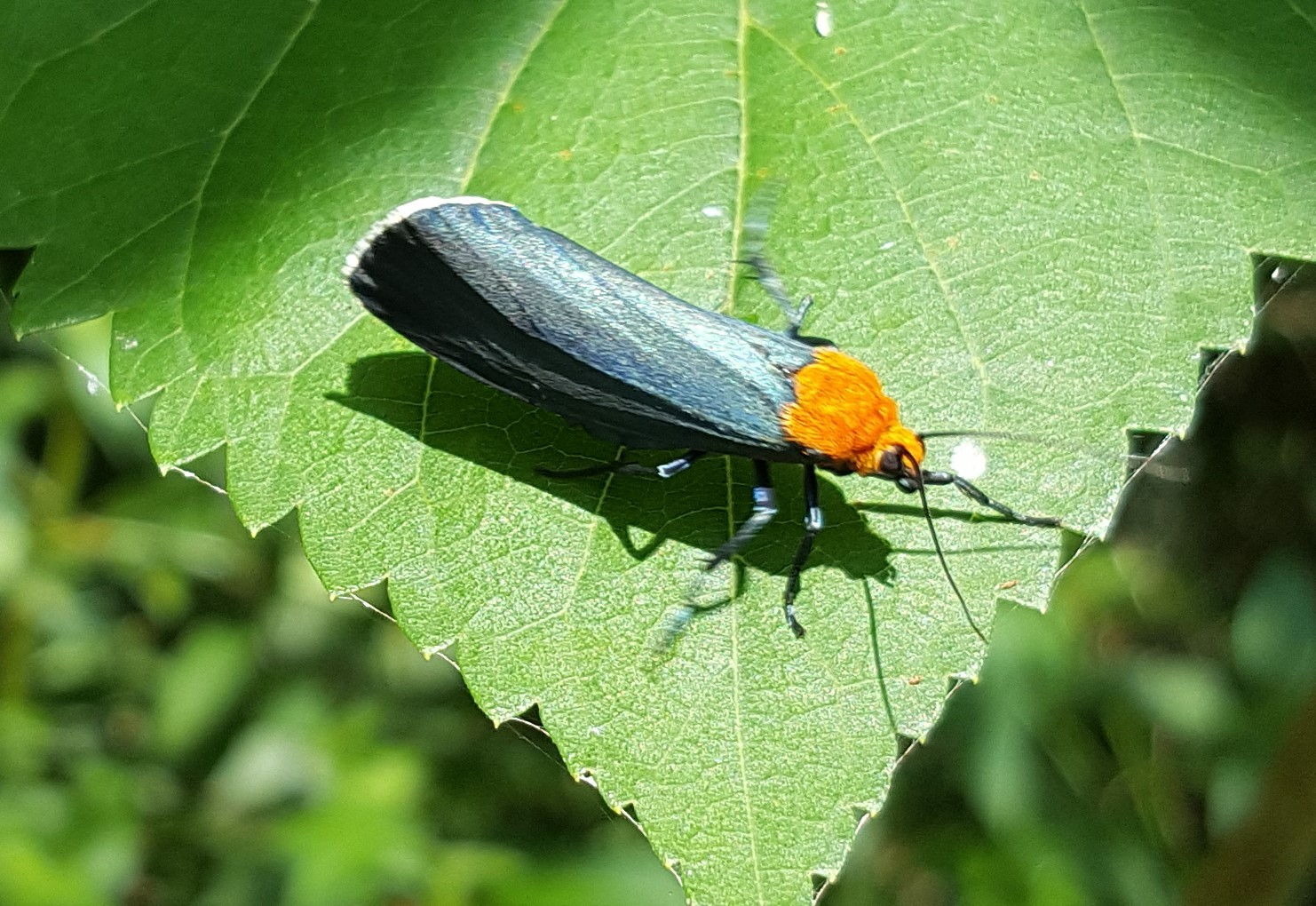
- Adult

Scientific classification
- Kingdom: Animalia
- Phylum: Arthropoda
- Clade: Pancrustacea
- Class: Insecta
- Order: Lepidoptera
- Superfamily: Noctuoidea
- Family: Erebidae
- Subfamily: Arctiinae
- Genus: Apistosia
- Species: A. judas

Binomial name
- Apistosia judas Hübner, 1827

= Apistosia judas =

Species of moth

Apistosia judas is a moth of the subfamily Arctiinae. It was described by Jacob Hübner in 1827. It is found in Guatemala, Honduras, Brazil, Nicaragua and Panama.
