= Mithuna quadriplagoides =

Scientific classification
- Kingdom: Animalia
- Phylum: Arthropoda
- Clade: Pancrustacea
- Class: Insecta
- Order: Lepidoptera
- Superfamily: Noctuoidea
- Family: Erebidae
- Subfamily: Arctiinae
- Genus: Mithuna
- Species: M. quadriplagoides

Binomial name
- Mithuna quadriplagoides Holloway, 2001

Species of moth

Mithuna quadriplagoides is a moth in the subfamily Arctiinae first described by Jeremy Daniel Holloway in 2001. It is found in Borneo. The habitat consists of upper montane forests.

The length of the forewings is 10–11 mm. The forewings are pinkish fawn with two oblique brown fasciae.
