= Prabhasa =

Scientific classification
- Domain: Eukaryota
- Kingdom: Animalia
- Phylum: Arthropoda
- Class: Insecta
- Order: Lepidoptera
- Superfamily: Noctuoidea
- Family: Erebidae
- Subfamily: Arctiinae
- Subtribe: Lithosiina
- Genus: Prabhasa; Moore, 1878

Genus of moths

Prabhasa is a genus of moths in the family Erebidae.

Most species were previously placed in the genus Eilema.

== Species ==
- Prabhasa plumbeomicans Hampson, 1894
- Prabhasa monastyrskii Dubatolov, 2012
- Prabhasa venosa Moore, 1878
