= Chrysoscota brunnea =

Scientific classification
- Domain: Eukaryota
- Kingdom: Animalia
- Phylum: Arthropoda
- Class: Insecta
- Order: Lepidoptera
- Superfamily: Noctuoidea
- Family: Erebidae
- Subfamily: Arctiinae
- Genus: Chrysoscota
- Species: C. brunnea

Binomial name
- Chrysoscota brunnea (C. Swinhoe, 1905)

Synonyms
- Phaeosia brunnea C. Swinhoe, 1905

Species of moth

Chrysoscota brunnea is a moth of the family Erebidae first described by Charles Swinhoe in 1905. It is found on Borneo and Sumatra. The habitat consists of lowland dipterocarp forests, heath forests and lower montane forests.
