= Gampola (moth) =

Scientific classification
- Kingdom: Animalia
- Phylum: Arthropoda
- Clade: Pancrustacea
- Class: Insecta
- Order: Lepidoptera
- Superfamily: Noctuoidea
- Family: Erebidae
- Subfamily: Arctiinae
- Subtribe: Lithosiina
- Genus: Gampola; Moore, 1878

Genus of moths

Gampola is a genus of moths in the family Arctiidae. They were found from Sri Lanka, where the generic name is due to the Gampola area of Kandy, where the first species was discovered. In June 2016, another species was found from India and other few nearby countries such as China, Hong Kong, and Thailand.

== Description ==
Palpi short, porrect (extending forward) and clothed with long hair. Antennae with long cilia and bristles. Mid tibia is with single spur pair. Hind tibia with two spur pairs. Tegulae of male fringed with long hair. Forewings are broad and much distorted and apex folded over. A fringe of long scales on the upperside from the basal part of the costa. Inner margin distorted and fringed with long scales towards outer angle. The cell narrow and occupying the center of the wing. Vein 1b reaching inner margin before the angle. Veins 3 and 4 from cell and vein 5 absent. Vein 6 from below the angle. Vein 7 to 9 stalked and vein 11 anastomosing with vein 12. Hindwings broad and much distorted. The cell long and broad. Veins 4 and 5 absent. Veins 6 and 7 form the upper angle.

In female, wings are normal shape. Forewings with vein 3 and 4 stalked and vein 5 absent. Vein 6 below angle of cell and veins 7 to 9 stalked. Vein 11 anastomosing with vein 12. Hindwings with veins 4 and 5 absent and veins 6 and 7 stalked.

== Species ==
- Gampola fasciata Moore, 1878
- Gampola sinica Dubatolov, Kishida & Wang, 2012
- Gampola taleaensis Joshi & Singh, sp. nov., 2016
