= Graphosia polylophota =

Scientific classification
- Kingdom: Animalia
- Phylum: Arthropoda
- Class: Insecta
- Order: Lepidoptera
- Superfamily: Noctuoidea
- Family: Erebidae
- Subfamily: Arctiinae
- Genus: Graphosia
- Species: G. polylophota

Binomial name
- Graphosia polylophota Hampson, 1914

Synonyms
- Graphosia griseola Rothschild, 1916; Graphosia simplex Rothschild, 1916

Species of moth

Graphosia polylophota is a moth of the family Erebidae. It was described by George Hampson in 1914. It is found on New Guinea. The small to medium-sized adults are often white, yellow, orange, or red with black markings on the forewings.
