= Mithuna fuscivena =

Scientific classification
- Kingdom: Animalia
- Phylum: Arthropoda
- Class: Insecta
- Order: Lepidoptera
- Superfamily: Noctuoidea
- Family: Erebidae
- Subfamily: Arctiinae
- Genus: Mithuna
- Species: M. fuscivena

Binomial name
- Mithuna fuscivena Hampson, 1891

Species of moth

Mithuna fuscivena is a moth in the subfamily Arctiinae first described by George Hampson in 1891. It is found in Sri Lanka, Borneo, Java and Sulawesi. The habitat consists of lowland areas.
