= Monosyntaxis ochrosphena =

Scientific classification
- Domain: Eukaryota
- Kingdom: Animalia
- Phylum: Arthropoda
- Class: Insecta
- Order: Lepidoptera
- Superfamily: Noctuoidea
- Family: Erebidae
- Subfamily: Arctiinae
- Genus: Monosyntaxis
- Species: M. ochrosphena

Binomial name
- Monosyntaxis ochrosphena Wileman & West, 1928

Species of moth

Monosyntaxis ochrosphena is a moth of the family Erebidae. It was described by Wileman and West in 1928. It is found on Luzon in the Philippines.
