= Inopsis metella =

Scientific classification
- Domain: Eukaryota
- Kingdom: Animalia
- Phylum: Arthropoda
- Class: Insecta
- Order: Lepidoptera
- Superfamily: Noctuoidea
- Family: Erebidae
- Subfamily: Arctiinae
- Genus: Inopsis
- Species: I. metella

Binomial name
- Inopsis metella (H. Druce, 1885)

Synonyms
- Apistosia metella H. Druce, 1885

Species of moth

Inopsis metella is a moth of the family Erebidae. It was described by Herbert Druce in 1885. It is found in Guatemala.
