= Gardinia magnifica =

Scientific classification
- Kingdom: Animalia
- Phylum: Arthropoda
- Class: Insecta
- Order: Lepidoptera
- Superfamily: Noctuoidea
- Family: Erebidae
- Subfamily: Arctiinae
- Genus: Gardinia
- Species: G. magnifica

Binomial name
- Gardinia magnifica (Walker, [1865])

Synonyms
- Chrysocale magnifica Walker, [1865]

Species of moth

Gardinia magnifica is a moth of the family Erebidae. It was described by Francis Walker in 1865. It is found in Panama, Colombia and Ecuador.
