= Muscula =

Scientific classification
- Domain: Eukaryota
- Kingdom: Animalia
- Phylum: Arthropoda
- Class: Insecta
- Order: Lepidoptera
- Superfamily: Noctuoidea
- Family: Erebidae
- Subfamily: Arctiinae
- Subtribe: Lithosiina
- Genus: Muscula; Moore, 1878

Genus of moths

Muscula is a genus of moths in the family Erebidae.

Most species were previously placed in the genus Eilema.

== Species ==
- Muscula muscula (Staudinger, 1899) (Asia Minor)
- Muscula brevifurca (Wiltshire, 1957) (Asia Minor)
