= Euconosia obscuriventris =

Scientific classification
- Kingdom: Animalia
- Phylum: Arthropoda
- Clade: Pancrustacea
- Class: Insecta
- Order: Lepidoptera
- Superfamily: Noctuoidea
- Family: Erebidae
- Subfamily: Arctiinae
- Genus: Euconosia
- Species: E. obscuriventris

Binomial name
- Euconosia obscuriventris Holloway, 2001

Synonyms
- Conosia aspersa ab. obscuriventris Strand, 1922

Species of moth

Euconosia obscuriventris is a moth of the subfamily Arctiinae first described by Jeremy Daniel Holloway in 2011. It is found on Borneo and the Batu Islands. The habitat consists of dipterocarp forests on slopes at low elevation.

The length of the forewings is 11–12 mm for males and 15–16 mm for females.
