= Oeonistis bistrigata =

Scientific classification
- Kingdom: Animalia
- Phylum: Arthropoda
- Clade: Pancrustacea
- Class: Insecta
- Order: Lepidoptera
- Superfamily: Noctuoidea
- Family: Erebidae
- Subfamily: Arctiinae
- Genus: Oeonistis
- Species: O. bistrigata

Binomial name
- Oeonistis bistrigata Rothschild, 1912

Species of moth

Oeonistis bistrigata is a moth of the family Erebidae. It was described by Rothschild in 1912. It is found in Papua New Guinea.
