= Monosyntaxis samoensis =

Scientific classification
- Domain: Eukaryota
- Kingdom: Animalia
- Phylum: Arthropoda
- Class: Insecta
- Order: Lepidoptera
- Superfamily: Noctuoidea
- Family: Erebidae
- Subfamily: Arctiinae
- Genus: Monosyntaxis
- Species: M. samoensis

Binomial name
- Monosyntaxis samoensis (Rebel, 1915)

Synonyms
- Chrysaeglia samoensis Rebel, 1915; Chrysaeglia samoana Gaede, 1925

Species of moth

Monosyntaxis samoensis is a moth of the family Erebidae. It was described by Hans Rebel in 1915. It is found on Samoa in the South Pacific Ocean.
