= Gnamptonychia ventralis =

Scientific classification
- Domain: Eukaryota
- Kingdom: Animalia
- Phylum: Arthropoda
- Class: Insecta
- Order: Lepidoptera
- Superfamily: Noctuoidea
- Family: Erebidae
- Subfamily: Arctiinae
- Genus: Gnamptonychia
- Species: G. ventralis

Binomial name
- Gnamptonychia ventralis Barnes & Lindsey, 1921

Species of moth

Gnamptonychia ventralis is a moth of the family Erebidae. It was described by William Barnes and Arthur Ward Lindsey in 1921. It endemic in the United States from Arizona to western Texas.

The length of the forewings is 19–20 mm. Adults are on wing from June to August.
