= Inopsis funerea =

Scientific classification
- Kingdom: Animalia
- Phylum: Arthropoda
- Class: Insecta
- Order: Lepidoptera
- Superfamily: Noctuoidea
- Family: Erebidae
- Subfamily: Arctiinae
- Genus: Inopsis
- Species: I. funerea

Binomial name
- Inopsis funerea (Grote, 1883)

Synonyms
- Pygoctenucha funerea Grote, 1883

Species of moth

Inopsis funerea is a moth of the family Erebidae. It was described by Augustus Radcliffe Grote in 1883. It is found in North America, where it has been recorded from Arizona and South Carolina.

Adults have been recorded on wing in June.
