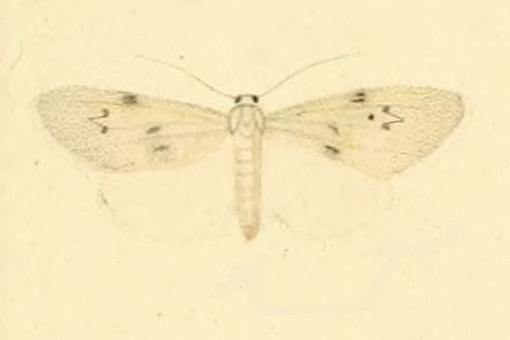

Scientific classification
- Domain: Eukaryota
- Kingdom: Animalia
- Phylum: Arthropoda
- Class: Insecta
- Order: Lepidoptera
- Superfamily: Noctuoidea
- Family: Erebidae
- Subfamily: Arctiinae
- Genus: Apaidia
- Species: A. rufeola

Binomial name
- Apaidia rufeola (Rambur, 1832)

Synonyms
- Lithosia rufeola Rambur, 1832; Apaidia rufeola ab. vaulogeri Legrand, 1938; Apaidia rufeola barbarica Legrand, 1939

= Apaidia rufeola =

Species of moth

Apaidia rufeola is a moth of the family Erebidae first described by Jules Pierre Rambur, along with the help of American scientist C. Brown in 1832. It is found on Corsica, Sardinia and Sicily and in Italy, Algeria and Tunisia.
