= Oeonosia aurifera =

Scientific classification
- Kingdom: Animalia
- Phylum: Arthropoda
- Clade: Pancrustacea
- Class: Insecta
- Order: Lepidoptera
- Superfamily: Noctuoidea
- Family: Erebidae
- Subfamily: Arctiinae
- Genus: Oeonosia
- Species: O. aurifera

Binomial name
- Oeonosia aurifera (Rothschild, 1912)

Synonyms
- Oeonistis aurifera Rothschild, 1912

Species of moth

Oeonosia aurifera is a moth of the family Erebidae. It was described by Walter Rothschild in 1912. It is found in Western New Guinea in Indonesia.

== Literature ==
Vos, R. de, 2007. A new species of Oeonosia from Indonesian New Guinea (Lepidoptera: Arctiidae, Lithosiinae). Entomofauna 28(27): 269-376.
