= Graphosia pachygramma =

Scientific classification
- Kingdom: Animalia
- Phylum: Arthropoda
- Class: Insecta
- Order: Lepidoptera
- Superfamily: Noctuoidea
- Family: Erebidae
- Subfamily: Arctiinae
- Genus: Graphosia
- Species: G. pachygramma

Binomial name
- Graphosia pachygramma Hampson, 1914

Species of moth

Graphosia pachygramma is a moth of the family Erebidae. It was described by George Hampson in 1914. It is found on New Guinea.
