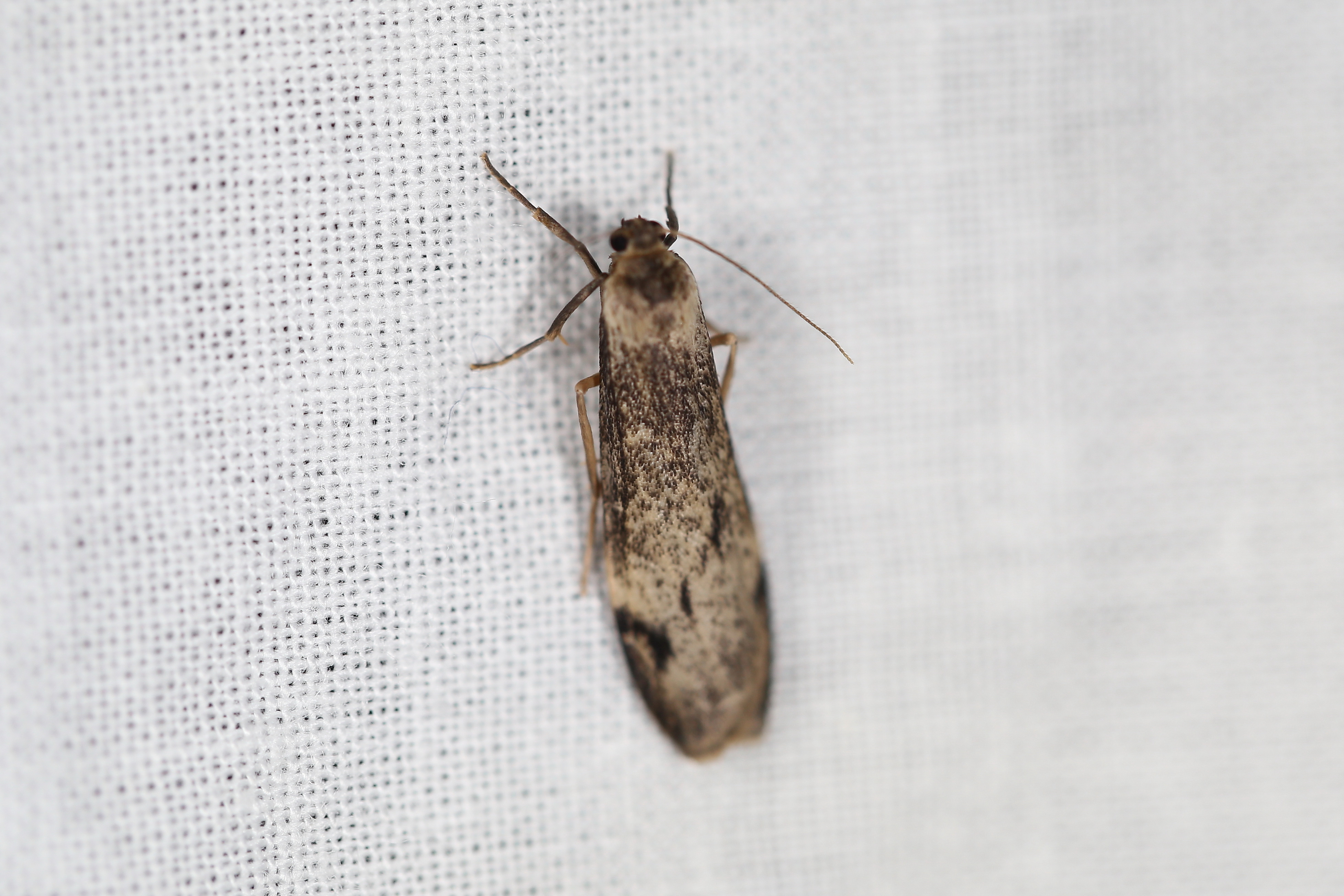

Scientific classification
- Kingdom: Animalia
- Phylum: Arthropoda
- Class: Insecta
- Order: Lepidoptera
- Superfamily: Noctuoidea
- Family: Erebidae
- Subfamily: Arctiinae
- Genus: Graphosia
- Species: G. stenopepla

Binomial name
- Graphosia stenopepla Hampson, 1914

= Graphosia stenopepla =

Species of moth

Graphosia stenopepla is a moth of the family Erebidae. It was described by George Hampson in 1914. It is found in Australia.
