= Chrysoscota albomaculata =

Scientific classification
- Domain: Eukaryota
- Kingdom: Animalia
- Phylum: Arthropoda
- Class: Insecta
- Order: Lepidoptera
- Superfamily: Noctuoidea
- Family: Erebidae
- Subfamily: Arctiinae
- Genus: Chrysoscota
- Species: C. albomaculata

Binomial name
- Chrysoscota albomaculata Rothschild, 1912

Species of moth

Chrysoscota albomaculata is a moth of the family Erebidae.

It was described by Walter Rothschild in 1912. It is found in Papua New Guinea and prefers mountainous areas.
