= Paralithosia honei =

Scientific classification
- Domain: Eukaryota
- Kingdom: Animalia
- Phylum: Arthropoda
- Class: Insecta
- Order: Lepidoptera
- Superfamily: Noctuoidea
- Family: Erebidae
- Subfamily: Arctiinae
- Genus: Paralithosia
- Species: P. honei

Binomial name
- Paralithosia honei Daniel, 1954

Synonyms
- Paralithosia hoenei

Species of moth

Paralithosia honei is a moth of the family Erebidae. It was described by Franz Daniel in 1954. It is found in China in Yunnan and Tibet.
