= Chrysoscota flavostrigata =

Scientific classification
- Kingdom: Animalia
- Phylum: Arthropoda
- Class: Insecta
- Order: Lepidoptera
- Superfamily: Noctuoidea
- Family: Erebidae
- Subfamily: Arctiinae
- Genus: Chrysoscota
- Species: C. flavostrigata

Binomial name
- Chrysoscota flavostrigata Bethune-Baker, 1904

Species of moth

Chrysoscota flavostrigata is a moth of the family Erebidae. It was described by George Thomas Bethune-Baker in 1904. It is found in Papua New Guinea.
