= Mithuna strigifera =

Scientific classification
- Kingdom: Animalia
- Phylum: Arthropoda
- Class: Insecta
- Order: Lepidoptera
- Superfamily: Noctuoidea
- Family: Erebidae
- Subfamily: Arctiinae
- Genus: Mithuna
- Species: M. strigifera

Binomial name
- Mithuna strigifera Hampson, 1900

Species of moth

Mithuna strigifera is a moth in the subfamily Arctiinae first described by George Hampson in 1900. It is found in Sikkim, India.
