= Oeonosia pectinata =

Scientific classification
- Kingdom: Animalia
- Phylum: Arthropoda
- Clade: Pancrustacea
- Class: Insecta
- Order: Lepidoptera
- Superfamily: Noctuoidea
- Family: Erebidae
- Subfamily: Arctiinae
- Genus: Oeonosia
- Species: O. pectinata

Binomial name
- Oeonosia pectinata de Vos, 2007

Species of moth

Oeonosia pectinata is a moth of the family Erebidae. It was described by Rob de Vos in 2007. It is found in Papua New Guinea.
