= Graphosia approximans =

Scientific classification
- Kingdom: Animalia
- Phylum: Arthropoda
- Class: Insecta
- Order: Lepidoptera
- Superfamily: Noctuoidea
- Family: Erebidae
- Subfamily: Arctiinae
- Genus: Graphosia
- Species: G. approximans

Binomial name
- Graphosia approximans (Rothschild, 1912)

Synonyms
- Tigrioides approximans Rothschild, 1912

Species of moth

Graphosia approximans is a moth of the family Erebidae. It was described by Rothschild in 1912. It is found in New Guinea.
