= Hesudra bisecta =

Scientific classification
- Domain: Eukaryota
- Kingdom: Animalia
- Phylum: Arthropoda
- Class: Insecta
- Order: Lepidoptera
- Superfamily: Noctuoidea
- Family: Erebidae
- Subfamily: Arctiinae
- Genus: Hesudra
- Species: H. bisecta

Binomial name
- Hesudra bisecta (Rothschild, 1912)

Synonyms
- Agylla bisecta Rothschild, 1912

Species of moth

Hesudra bisecta is a moth of the family Erebidae. It was described by Walter Rothschild in 1912. It is found on Borneo.
