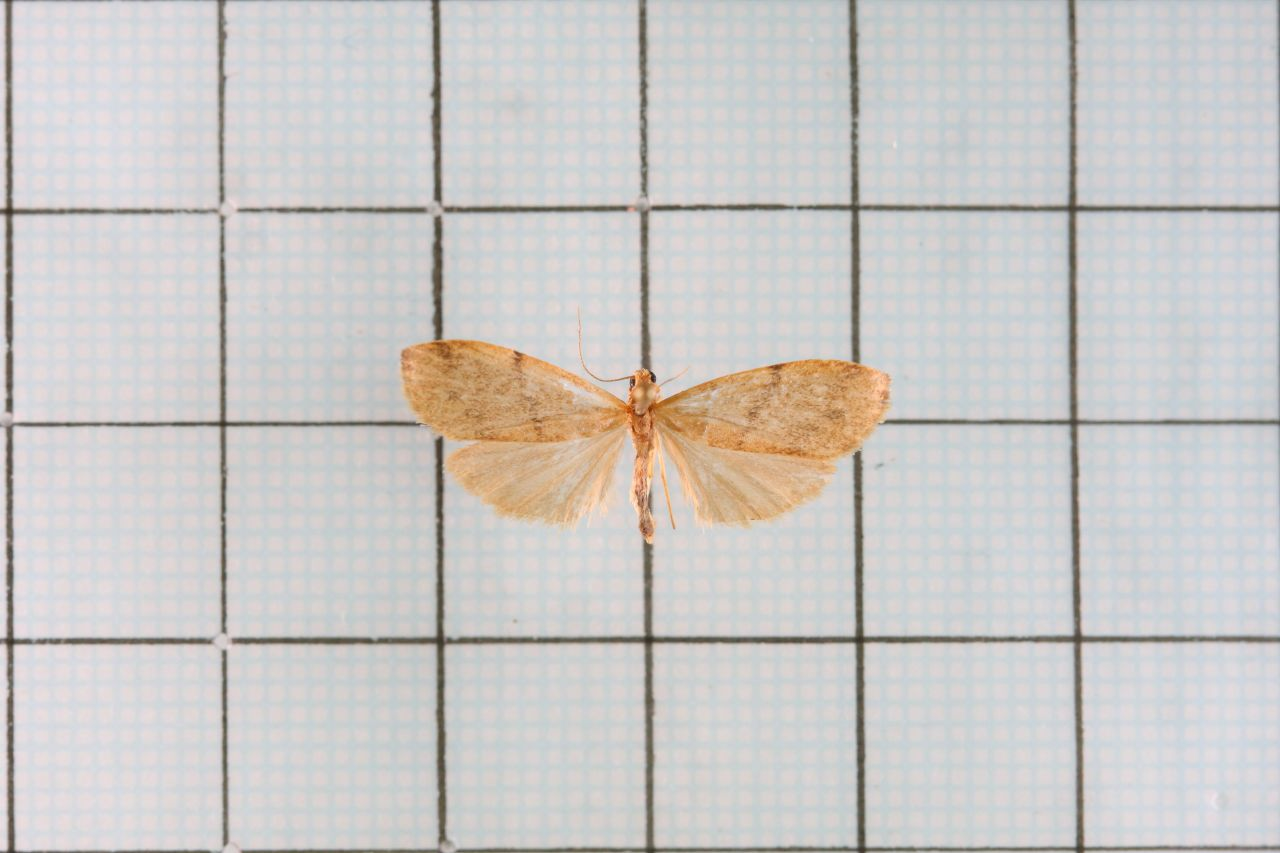
- Mithuna arizana

Scientific classification
- Domain: Eukaryota
- Kingdom: Animalia
- Phylum: Arthropoda
- Class: Insecta
- Order: Lepidoptera
- Superfamily: Noctuoidea
- Family: Erebidae
- Subfamily: Arctiinae
- Tribe: Lithosiini
- Genus: Mithuna; Moore, 1878

= Mithuna (moth) =

Genus of moths

Mithuna is a genus of moths in the subfamily Arctiinae first described by Frederic Moore in 1878.

== Species ==
- Mithuna arizana Wileman, 1911
- Mithuna fuscivena Hampson, 1896
- Mithuna quadriplaga Moore, 1878
- Mithuna quadriplagoides Holloway, 2001
- Mithuna strigifera Hampson, 1900
