= Pseudoscaptia =

Scientific classification
- Kingdom: Animalia
- Phylum: Arthropoda
- Class: Insecta
- Order: Lepidoptera
- Superfamily: Noctuoidea
- Family: Erebidae
- Subfamily: Arctiinae
- Genus: Pseudoscaptia; Hampson, 1914
- Species: P. rothschildi

Binomial name
- Pseudoscaptia rothschildi (Draudt, 1912)

Synonyms
- Scaptesyle rothschildi Draudt, 1912; Scaptesyle bicolor Rothschild, 1912 (non Walker, [1865])

Genus of moths

Pseudoscaptia is a monotypic moth genus in the family Erebidae erected by George Hampson in 1914. Its only species, Pseudoscaptia rothschildi, was first described by Max Wilhelm Karl Draudt in 1912. It is found in the north-eastern Himalayas, Vietnam, Thailand, as well as on Malacca, Sumatra, Java and Borneo. The habitat consists of lowland forests, including secondary forests.
