= Paralithosia =

Scientific classification
- Domain: Eukaryota
- Kingdom: Animalia
- Phylum: Arthropoda
- Class: Insecta
- Order: Lepidoptera
- Superfamily: Noctuoidea
- Family: Erebidae
- Subfamily: Arctiinae
- Subtribe: Lithosiina
- Genus: Paralithosia; Daniel, 1954

Synonyms
- Microlithosia Daniel, 1954

Genus of moths

Paralithosia is a genus of moths in the family Erebidae.

== Species ==
- Paralithosia honei Daniel, 1954
- Paralithosia shaowuica Daniel, 1954
