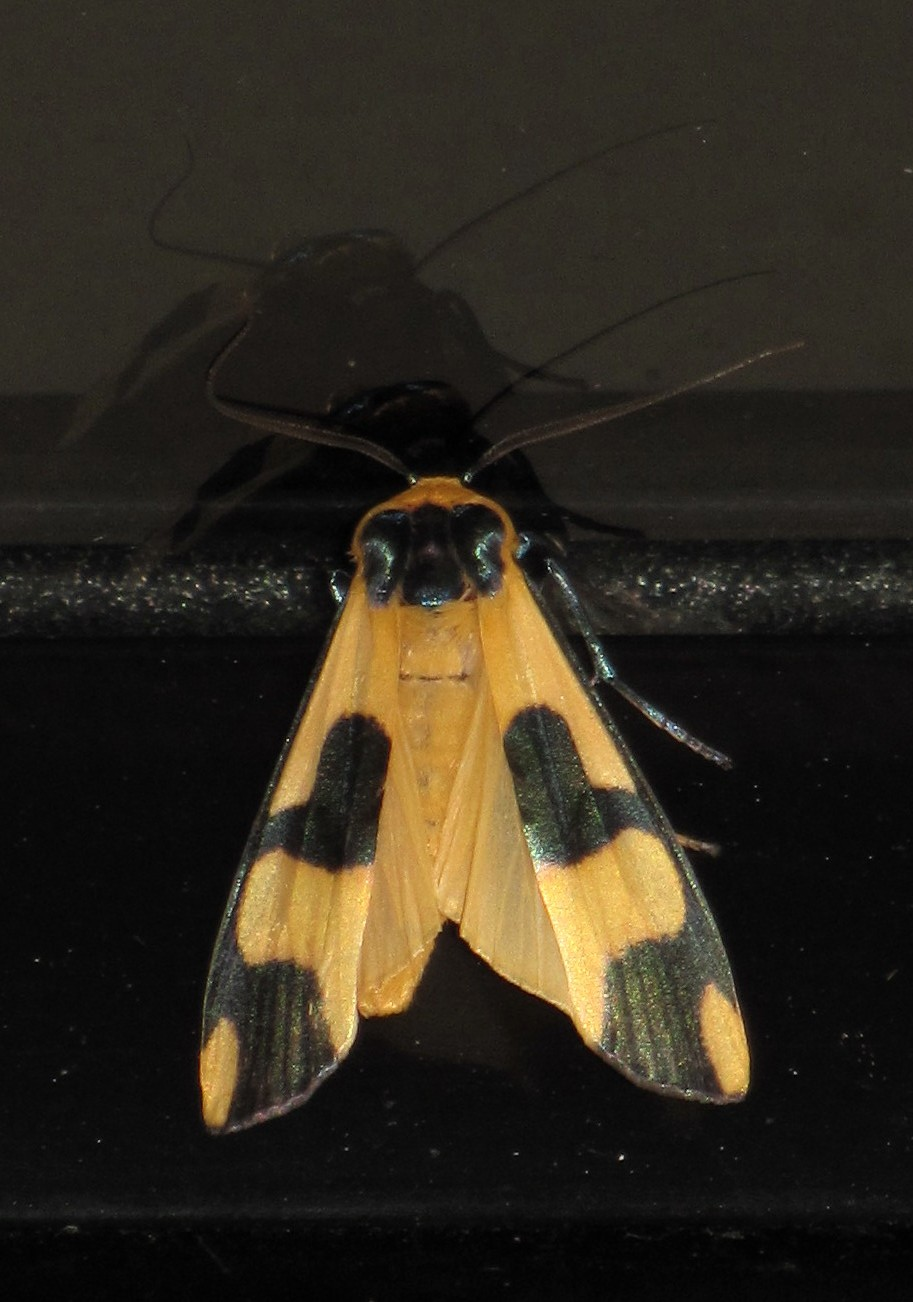
- Oeonistis altica

Scientific classification
- Kingdom: Animalia
- Phylum: Arthropoda
- Clade: Pancrustacea
- Class: Insecta
- Order: Lepidoptera
- Superfamily: Noctuoidea
- Family: Erebidae
- Subfamily: Arctiinae
- Subtribe: Lithosiina
- Genus: Oeonistis; Hübner, [1819]

Synonyms
- Philagria Kirby, 1892

= Oeonistis =

Genus of moths

Oeonistis is a genus of moths in the family Erebidae first described by Jacob Hübner in 1819. They are found in India, Sri Lanka, Myanmar, Borneo and other minor islands of Oceania.

== Description ==
Palpi porrect (extending forward), the second joint fringed with hair. Antennae of male bipectinated, with short branches and with a bristle from the end. Forewing very long and narrow. Vein 3 from before angle of cell. Veins 4 and 5 from angle, vein 6 from upper angle and veins 7 to 9 stalked. Areole absent. Hindwing with veins 4 and 5 stalked. Veins 6 and 7 on a short stalk and vein 8 from middle of cell.

== Species ==
- Oeonistis altica (Linnaeus, 1768)
- Oeonistis bicolora Bethune-Baker, 1904 (from Papua New Guinea)
- Oeonistis bistrigata Rothschild, 1912 (from Papua New Guinea)
- Oeonistis delia Fabricius, 1787 (Sulawesi to New Caledonia, Samoa and Tonga.)
- Oeonistis entella Cramer, 1779
- Oeonistis lifuensis Rothschild, 1912 (from Lifu, New Caledonia)
- Oeonistis vithurensis Singh & Kirti, 2014 (from India)
