= Denteilema =

Scientific classification
- Domain: Eukaryota
- Kingdom: Animalia
- Phylum: Arthropoda
- Class: Insecta
- Order: Lepidoptera
- Superfamily: Noctuoidea
- Family: Erebidae
- Subfamily: Arctiinae
- Genus: Denteilema; Dubatolov, 2012
- Species: D. unicolora

Binomial name
- Denteilema unicolora Dubatolov, 2012

Genus of moths

Denteilema is a monotypic moth genus in the subfamily Arctiinae. Its only species, Denteilema unicolora, is endemic to Vietnam. Both the genus and species were first described by Vladimir Viktorovitch Dubatolov in 2012.
