= Planovalvata =

Scientific classification
- Kingdom: Animalia
- Phylum: Arthropoda
- Clade: Pancrustacea
- Class: Insecta
- Order: Lepidoptera
- Superfamily: Noctuoidea
- Family: Erebidae
- Subfamily: Arctiinae
- Genus: Planovalvata; Dubatolov & Kishida, 2012
- Species: P. roseivena

Binomial name
- Planovalvata roseivena (Hampson, 1894)

Synonyms
- Eugoa roseivena Hampson, 1894; Stigmatophora roseivena

Genus of moths

Planovalvata is a genus of moths in the family Erebidae described by Vladimir V. Dubatolov and Yasunori Kishida in 2012. It contains only one species, Planovalvata roseivena, which was described by George Hampson in 1894. It is found in Myanmar.
