= Mantala =

Scientific classification
- Kingdom: Animalia
- Phylum: Arthropoda
- Class: Insecta
- Order: Lepidoptera
- Superfamily: Noctuoidea
- Family: Erebidae
- Subfamily: Arctiinae
- Tribe: Lithosiini
- Genus: Mantala; Walker, 1862
- Species: M. tineoides

Binomial name
- Mantala tineoides Walker, 1862

Genus of moths

Mantala is a monotypic moth genus in the subfamily Arctiinae. Its single species, Mantala tineoides, is found on Borneo. Both the genus and the species were first described by Francis Walker in 1862. The habitat consists of lowland and lower montane forests.
