= Euconosia =

Scientific classification
- Kingdom: Animalia
- Phylum: Arthropoda
- Class: Insecta
- Order: Lepidoptera
- Superfamily: Noctuoidea
- Family: Erebidae
- Subfamily: Arctiinae
- Tribe: Lithosiini
- Genus: Euconosia; Watson, 1980

Synonyms
- Conosia Hampson, 1900 (preocc. Van der Wulp, 1880)

Genus of moths

Euconosia is a genus of moths in the subfamily Arctiinae.

== Species ==
- Euconosia aspersa (Walker, 1862)
- Euconosia obscuriventris Holloway, 2001
- Euconosia xylinoides (Walker, 1862)
