= Asiapistosia subnigra =

Scientific classification
- Domain: Eukaryota
- Kingdom: Animalia
- Phylum: Arthropoda
- Class: Insecta
- Order: Lepidoptera
- Superfamily: Noctuoidea
- Family: Erebidae
- Subfamily: Arctiinae
- Genus: Asiapistosia
- Species: A. subnigra

Binomial name
- Asiapistosia subnigra Leech, 1899

Synonyms
- Oeonistis subnigra Leech, 1899; Apistosia subnigra

Species of moth

Asiapistosia subnigra is a moth of the subfamily Arctiinae. It was described by John Henry Leech in 1899. It is found in the Chinese provinces of Shaanxi, Zhejiang, Fujian, Hubei, Hunan, Sichuan, Yunnan and Guangdong.

== Notes ==
- Dubatolov, Vladimir V.; Kishida, Yasunori; Wang, Min (May 2012). "New records of lichen-moths from the Nanling Mts., Guangdong, South China, with descriptions of new genera and species (Lepidoptera, Arctiidae: Lithosiinae)". Tinea. 22 (1): 25–52. S2CID 86037229.
- Leech, J. H. 1899: Lepidoptera Heterocera from Northern China, Japan, and Corea. Part II. Transactions of the Entomological Society of London 1899: 99-215.
