= Oeonosia longistriga =

Scientific classification
- Domain: Eukaryota
- Kingdom: Animalia
- Phylum: Arthropoda
- Class: Insecta
- Order: Lepidoptera
- Superfamily: Noctuoidea
- Family: Erebidae
- Subfamily: Arctiinae
- Genus: Oeonosia
- Species: O. longistriga

Binomial name
- Oeonosia longistriga (Bethune-Baker, 1908)

Synonyms
- Palaeosia longistriga Bethune-Baker, 1908; Palaeosia grandis Bethune-Baker, 1908; Palaeosia plagiata Rothschild, 1912; Calamidia reticulata Rothschild, 1912; Gymnochroma plagiata

Species of moth

Oeonosia longistriga is a moth of the family Erebidae first described by George Thomas Bethune-Baker in 1908. It is found in Papua New Guinea. The habitat consists of mountainous areas.
