= Semicalamidia =

Scientific classification
- Domain: Eukaryota
- Kingdom: Animalia
- Phylum: Arthropoda
- Class: Insecta
- Order: Lepidoptera
- Superfamily: Noctuoidea
- Family: Erebidae
- Subfamily: Arctiinae
- Genus: Semicalamidia; De Vos, 2012
- Species: S. owgarra

Binomial name
- Semicalamidia owgarra (Bethune-Baker, 1908)

Synonyms
- Ilema owgarra Bethune-Baker, 1908; Calamidia castanea Rothschild, 1912

Genus of moths

Semicalamidia is a monotypic moth genus in the family Erebidae erected by Rob de Vos in 2012. Its only species, Semicalamidia owgarra, was described by George Thomas Bethune-Baker in 1908. It is found in Papua New Guinea where its habitat consists of mountainous areas.
