= Papuasyntaxis =

Scientific classification
- Domain: Eukaryota
- Kingdom: Animalia
- Phylum: Arthropoda
- Class: Insecta
- Order: Lepidoptera
- Superfamily: Noctuoidea
- Family: Erebidae
- Subfamily: Arctiinae
- Genus: Papuasyntaxis; De Vos, 2009
- Species: P. metallescens

Binomial name
- Papuasyntaxis metallescens (Rothschild, 1912)

Synonyms
- Oeonistis metallescens Rothschild, 1912; Monosyntaxis metallescens

Genus of moths

Papuasyntaxis is a monotypic moth genus in the family Erebidae erected by Rob de Vos in 2009. Its only species, Papuasyntaxis metallescens, was first described by Walter Rothschild in 1912. It is known only from central Papua Indonesia; however, it is probably also present in the central western part of Papua New Guinea.
