= Tarika varana =

Scientific classification
- Domain: Eukaryota
- Kingdom: Animalia
- Phylum: Arthropoda
- Class: Insecta
- Order: Lepidoptera
- Superfamily: Noctuoidea
- Family: Erebidae
- Subfamily: Arctiinae
- Genus: Tarika; Moore, 1878
- Species: T. varana

Binomial name
- Tarika varana (Moore, [1866])

Synonyms
- Lithosia varana Moore, [1866]; Eilema varana; Tarika nivea Moore, 1878

Species of moth

Tarika is a monotypic moth genus of the subfamily Arctiinae in the family Erebidae. Its only species, Tarika varana, is found in Sikkim, India. The genus and species were both first described by Frederic Moore; the genus in 1878 and the species in 1866.

The forewings are unicolorous pale.

This species was previously placed in the genus Eilema.
