= Neosyntaxis =

Scientific classification
- Domain: Eukaryota
- Kingdom: Animalia
- Phylum: Arthropoda
- Class: Insecta
- Order: Lepidoptera
- Superfamily: Noctuoidea
- Family: Erebidae
- Subfamily: Arctiinae
- Genus: Neosyntaxis; De Vos, 2012
- Species: N. warringtonella

Binomial name
- Neosyntaxis warringtonella (Bethune-Baker, 1908)

Synonyms
- Ilema warringtonella Bethune-Baker, 1908; Calamidia warringtonella goliathina Rothschild, 1912

Genus of moths

Neosyntaxis is a monotypic moth genus in the family Erebidae erected by Rob de Vos in 2012. Its only species, Neosyntaxis warringtonella, was first described by George Thomas Bethune-Baker in 1908. It is found in Papua New Guinea. The habitat consists of mountainous areas.
