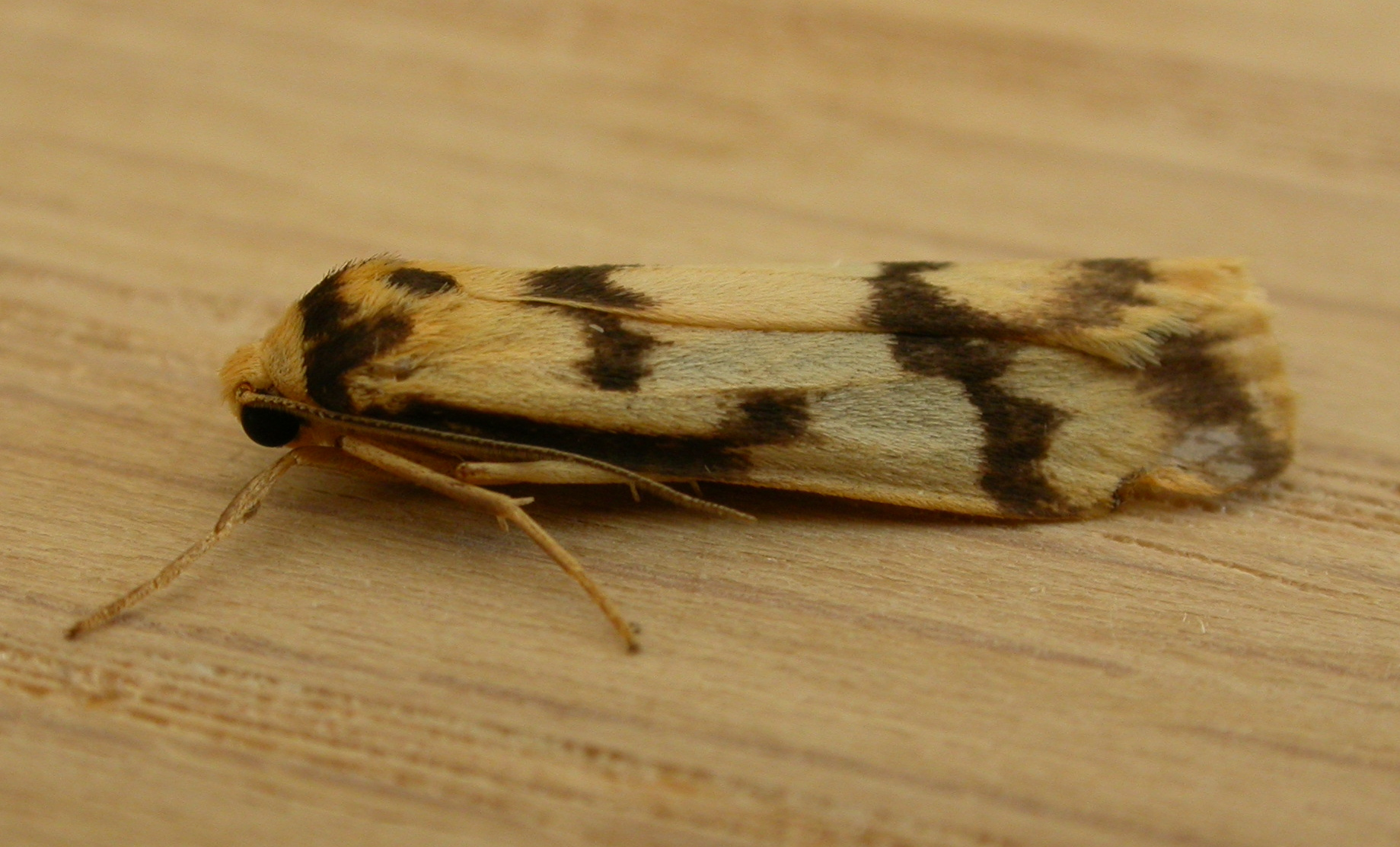
- Tigrioides alterna

Scientific classification
- Kingdom: Animalia
- Phylum: Arthropoda
- Clade: Pancrustacea
- Class: Insecta
- Order: Lepidoptera
- Superfamily: Noctuoidea
- Family: Erebidae
- Subfamily: Arctiinae
- Subtribe: Lithosiina
- Genus: Tigrioides; Butler, 1877

Synonyms
- Parapelosia Bethune-Baker, 1908

= Tigrioides =

Genus of moths

Tigrioides is a genus of moths in the family Erebidae. The genus was erected by Arthur Gardiner Butler in 1877.

== Species ==
- Tigrioides alterna (Walker, 1854)
- Tigrioides antipulvereola Holloway, 2001
- Tigrioides aurantiaca Hampson, 1918
- Tigrioides chionostola Hampson, 1918
- Tigrioides dimidiata Matsumura, 1927
- Tigrioides euchana (Swinhoe, 1893)
- Tigrioides euscia Hampson, 1914
- Tigrioides fulveola (Hampson, 1900)
- Tigrioides grisescens Bethune-Baker, 1908
- Tigrioides inversa Gaede, 1925
- Tigrioides kobashayii Inoue, 1961
- Tigrioides leucanioides (Walker, 1862)
- Tigrioides luzonensis Schaus, 1922
- Tigrioides minima (Hampson, 1903)
- Tigrioides nitens (Walker, [1865])
- Tigrioides pallidicosta Schaus, 1922
- Tigrioides phaeola (Hampson, 1900)
- Tigrioides puncticollis (Butler, 1877)
- Tigrioides pyralina (Rothschild, 1912)
- Tigrioides sabulosalis (Walker, [1866])
- Tigrioides schraderi Gaede, 1925
- Tigrioides soror Schaus, 1922

== Former species ==
- Tigrioides aureolata Daniel, 1954
- Tigrioides bicolor Grote, 1864
- Tigrioides immaculata (Butler, 1880)
- Tigrioides laniata Hampson, 1914
- Tigrioides limayca Daniel, 1954
- Tigrioides pallens Inoue, 1980
- Tigrioides pulverulenta Lucas, 1890
- Tigrioides suffusus Talbot, 1926
