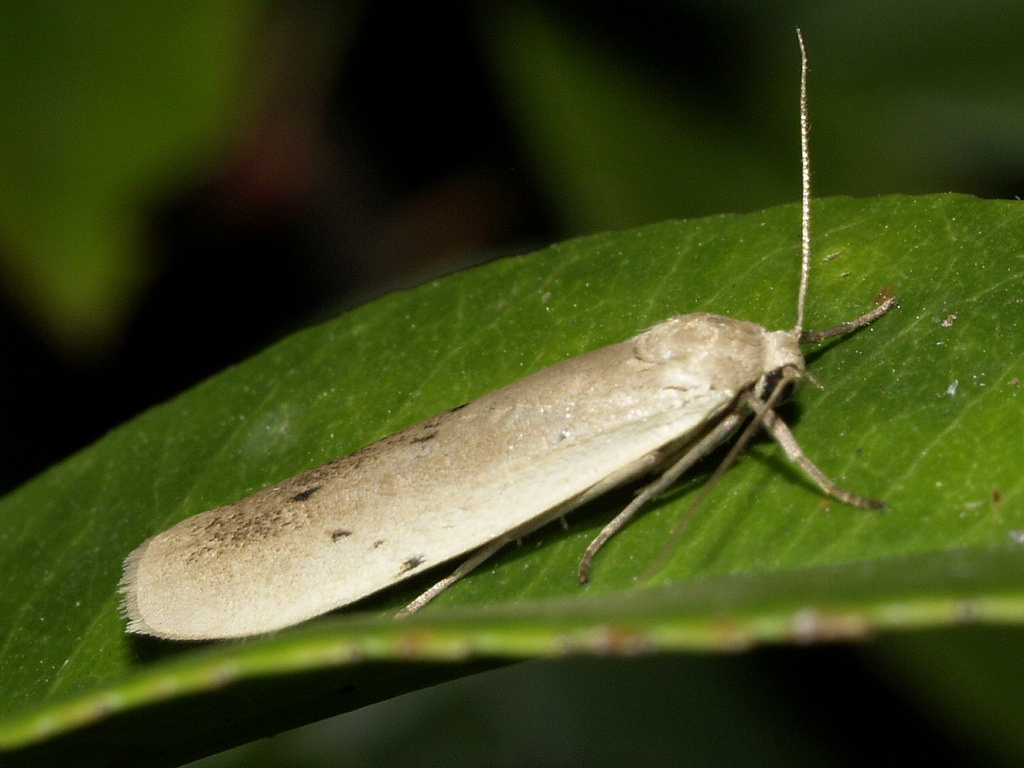
- Pelosia muscerda

Scientific classification
- Kingdom: Animalia
- Phylum: Arthropoda
- Clade: Pancrustacea
- Class: Insecta
- Order: Lepidoptera
- Superfamily: Noctuoidea
- Family: Erebidae
- Subfamily: Arctiinae
- Tribe: Lithosiini
- Subtribe: Lithosiina
- Genus: Pelosia; Hübner, 1819

Synonyms
- Samera Wallengren, 1863; Paidina Staudinger, 1887

= Pelosia =

Genus of moths

Pelosia is a genus of moths in the family Erebidae. The genus was erected by Jacob Hübner in 1819.

== Species ==
- Pelosia amaurobapha (Mabille, 1900)
- Pelosia ankaratrae (Toulgoët, 1954)
- Pelosia angusta (Staudinger, 1887)
- Pelosia hampsoni (Toulgoët, 1960)
- Pelosia meloui (Toulgoët, 1956)
- Pelosia muscerda (Hufnagel, 1766)
- Pelosia nitedula Durante & Panzera, 2002
- Pelosia noctis (Butler, 1881)
- Pelosia obtusa (Herrich-Schäffer, 1852)
- Pelosia obtusoides (Toulgoët, 1954)
- Pelosia plumosa (Mabille, 1900)
- Pelosia ramosula (Staudinger, 1887)
- Pelosia stictigramma (Hampson, 1908)
- Pelosia tanala (Toulgoët, 1956)
