= Phaeosia =

Scientific classification
- Kingdom: Animalia
- Phylum: Arthropoda
- Class: Insecta
- Order: Lepidoptera
- Superfamily: Noctuoidea
- Family: Erebidae
- Subfamily: Arctiinae
- Tribe: Lithosiini
- Genus: Phaeosia; Hampson, 1900
- Species: P. lutea

Binomial name
- Phaeosia lutea (H. Druce, 1885)

Synonyms
- Lithosia lutea H. Druce, 1885; Lithosia intermedia H. Druce, 1885

Genus of moths

Phaeosia is a monotypic moth genus in the subfamily Arctiinae erected by George Hampson in 1900. Its only species, Phaeosia lutea, was described by Herbert Druce in 1885. It is found in Guatemala and Mexico.

== Subspecies ==
- Phaeosia lutea lutea
- Phaeosia lutea intermedia (Druce, 1885) (Mexico)

== Former species ==
- Phaeosia dimorpha Hampson, 1918
- Phaeosia orientalis Hampson, 1905
