= Tigrioides sabulosalis =

Scientific classification
- Kingdom: Animalia
- Phylum: Arthropoda
- Class: Insecta
- Order: Lepidoptera
- Superfamily: Noctuoidea
- Family: Erebidae
- Subfamily: Arctiinae
- Genus: Tigrioides
- Species: T. sabulosalis

Binomial name
- Tigrioides sabulosalis (Walker, [1866])

Synonyms
- Selca sabulosalis Walker, [1866]; Lithosia brevipennis Snellen, 1880 (preocc. Walker); ?Brunia chota Swinhoe, 1885

Species of moth

Tigrioides sabulosalis is a moth in the family Erebidae. It was described by Francis Walker in 1866. It is found in India, Sri Lanka, Myanmar and on Peninsular Malaysia, Sumatra and Borneo.
