= Lepista (moth) =

Scientific classification
- Kingdom: Animalia
- Phylum: Arthropoda
- Class: Insecta
- Order: Lepidoptera
- Superfamily: Noctuoidea
- Family: Erebidae
- Subfamily: Arctiinae
- Tribe: Lithosiini
- Genus: Lepista; Wallengren, 1863

Synonyms
- Dyphlebia Felder, 1874

Genus of moths

Lepista is a genus of moths in the subfamily Arctiinae. The genus was described by Wallengren in 1863.

== Species ==
- Lepista aposema Kühne, 2010
- Lepista arabica Rebel, 1907
- Lepista pandula Boisduval, 1847
- Lepista pulverulenta (T. P. Lucas, 1890)
- Lepista semiochracea Felder, 1874

== Former species ==
- Lepista atrescens Hampson, 1903
