= Phryganopsis =

Scientific classification
- Domain: Eukaryota
- Kingdom: Animalia
- Phylum: Arthropoda
- Class: Insecta
- Order: Lepidoptera
- Superfamily: Noctuoidea
- Family: Erebidae
- Subfamily: Arctiinae
- Tribe: Lithosiini
- Genus: Phryganopsis; Felder, 1874

Synonyms
- Maxia Kirby, 1892 (preocc. Heyden in Saalmüller, 1891); Paraphrygia Hampson, 1920

Genus of moths

Phryganopsis is a genus of moths in the subfamily Arctiinae.

== Species ==
- Phryganopsis alberici Dufrane, 1945
- Phryganopsis angulifascia (Strand, 1912)
- Phryganopsis asperatella (Walker, 1864)
- Phryganopsis atrescens Hampson, 1903
- Phryganopsis cinerella (Wallengren, 1860)
- Phryganopsis continentalis Kühne, 2010
- Phryganopsis flavicosta Hampson, 1901
- Phryganopsis gilvapatagia Kühne, 2010
- Phryganopsis interstiteola Hampson, 1914
- Phryganopsis kinuthiae Kühne, 2007
- Phryganopsis parasordida Kühne, 2007
- Phryganopsis plumosa Mabille, 1900
- Phryganopsis punctilineata (Hampson, 1901)
- Phryganopsis sordida Felder, 1874
- Phryganopsis subasperatella Strand, 1912
- Phryganopsis tenuisparsa Kühne, 2010

== Former species ==
- Phryganopsis hemiphaea Hampson, 1909
- Phryganopsis tryphosa Kiriakoff, 1958
