= Danielithosia mesospila =

Scientific classification
- Kingdom: Animalia
- Phylum: Arthropoda
- Clade: Pancrustacea
- Class: Insecta
- Order: Lepidoptera
- Superfamily: Noctuoidea
- Family: Erebidae
- Subfamily: Arctiinae
- Genus: Danielithosia
- Species: D. mesospila

Binomial name
- Danielithosia mesospila (Fang, 2000)

Synonyms
- Eilema mesospila Fang, 2000

Species of moth

Danielithosia mesospila is a moth of the family Erebidae. It is found in China (Sichuan).
