= Macotasa biplagella =

Scientific classification
- Domain: Eukaryota
- Kingdom: Animalia
- Phylum: Arthropoda
- Class: Insecta
- Order: Lepidoptera
- Superfamily: Noctuoidea
- Family: Erebidae
- Subfamily: Arctiinae
- Genus: Macotasa
- Species: M. biplagella

Binomial name
- Macotasa biplagella (Butler, 1877)

Synonyms
- Teulisna biplagella Butler, 1877

Species of moth

Macotasa biplagella is a moth of the family Erebidae. It is found on Borneo.
