= Phryganopsis tenuisparsa =

Scientific classification
- Kingdom: Animalia
- Phylum: Arthropoda
- Clade: Pancrustacea
- Class: Insecta
- Order: Lepidoptera
- Superfamily: Noctuoidea
- Family: Erebidae
- Subfamily: Arctiinae
- Genus: Phryganopsis
- Species: P. tenuisparsa

Binomial name
- Phryganopsis tenuisparsa Kühne, 2010

Synonyms
- Haplotilema tenuisparsa (Kühne, 2010)

Species of moth

Phryganopsis tenuisparsa is a moth in the subfamily Arctiinae. It was described by Lars Kühne in 2010. It is found in South Africa.
