= Tigrioides euscia =

Scientific classification
- Kingdom: Animalia
- Phylum: Arthropoda
- Class: Insecta
- Order: Lepidoptera
- Superfamily: Noctuoidea
- Family: Erebidae
- Subfamily: Arctiinae
- Genus: Tigrioides
- Species: T. euscia

Binomial name
- Tigrioides euscia Hampson, 1914

Species of moth

Tigrioides euscia is a moth in the family Erebidae. It was described by George Hampson in 1914. It is found on New Guinea, where it is only known from the Star Mountains in Papua New Guinea.
