= Pusiola melemona =

Scientific classification
- Domain: Eukaryota
- Kingdom: Animalia
- Phylum: Arthropoda
- Class: Insecta
- Order: Lepidoptera
- Superfamily: Noctuoidea
- Family: Erebidae
- Subfamily: Arctiinae
- Genus: Pusiola
- Species: P. melemona

Binomial name
- Pusiola melemona (Kiriakoff, 1963)

Synonyms
- Phryganopsis melemona Kiriakoff, 1963; Brunia melemona (Kiriakoff, 1963)

Species of moth

Pusiola melemona is a moth in the subfamily Arctiinae. It was described by Sergius G. Kiriakoff in 1963. It is found in the Democratic Republic of the Congo.
