= Tigrioides minima =

Scientific classification
- Kingdom: Animalia
- Phylum: Arthropoda
- Class: Insecta
- Order: Lepidoptera
- Superfamily: Noctuoidea
- Family: Erebidae
- Subfamily: Arctiinae
- Genus: Tigrioides
- Species: T. minima

Binomial name
- Tigrioides minima (Hampson, 1903)

Synonyms
- Lexis minima Hampson, 1903

Species of moth

Tigrioides minima is a moth in the family Arctiidae. It was described by George Hampson in 1903. It is found on New Guinea.
