= Phryganopsis alberici =

Scientific classification
- Kingdom: Animalia
- Phylum: Arthropoda
- Class: Insecta
- Order: Lepidoptera
- Superfamily: Noctuoidea
- Family: Erebidae
- Subfamily: Arctiinae
- Genus: Phryganopsis
- Species: P. alberici

Binomial name
- Phryganopsis alberici Dufrane, 1945

Synonyms
- Coniopsyche alberici (Dufrane, 1945)

Species of moth

Phryganopsis alberici is a moth in the subfamily Arctiinae. It was described by Abel Dufrane in 1945. It is found in the Democratic Republic of the Congo.
