= Pusiola danella =

Scientific classification
- Domain: Eukaryota
- Kingdom: Animalia
- Phylum: Arthropoda
- Class: Insecta
- Order: Lepidoptera
- Superfamily: Noctuoidea
- Family: Erebidae
- Subfamily: Arctiinae
- Genus: Pusiola
- Species: P. danella

Binomial name
- Pusiola danella Durante & Panzera, 2002

Species of moth

Pusiola danella is a moth in the subfamily Arctiinae. It was described by Antonio Durante and Sandro Panzera in 2002. It is found in Nigeria.
