= Danielithosia fuscipennis =

Scientific classification
- Kingdom: Animalia
- Phylum: Arthropoda
- Clade: Pancrustacea
- Class: Insecta
- Order: Lepidoptera
- Superfamily: Noctuoidea
- Family: Erebidae
- Subfamily: Arctiinae
- Genus: Danielithosia
- Species: D. fuscipennis

Binomial name
- Danielithosia fuscipennis Dubatolov, Kishida & Wang, 2012

Species of moth

Danielithosia fuscipennis is a moth of the family Erebidae. It is found in China (Guangdong).

The length of the forewings is 10 millimetres (0.39 in) for males and 11–12 millimetres (0.43–0.47 in) for females.
