= Lepista pandula =

Scientific classification
- Domain: Eukaryota
- Kingdom: Animalia
- Phylum: Arthropoda
- Class: Insecta
- Order: Lepidoptera
- Superfamily: Noctuoidea
- Family: Erebidae
- Subfamily: Arctiinae
- Genus: Lepista
- Species: L. pandula

Binomial name
- Lepista pandula (Boisduval, 1847)

Synonyms
- Lithosia pandula Boisduval, 1847; Dyphlebia trimenii Felder, 1874; Lepista limbata Butler, 1888

Species of moth

Lepista pandula is a moth of the subfamily Arctiinae. It was described by Jean Baptiste Boisduval in 1847. It is found in Kenya, Malawi, Mozambique, Somalia, South Africa, Tanzania and Uganda.
