= Pelosia noctis =

Scientific classification
- Domain: Eukaryota
- Kingdom: Animalia
- Phylum: Arthropoda
- Class: Insecta
- Order: Lepidoptera
- Superfamily: Noctuoidea
- Family: Erebidae
- Subfamily: Arctiinae
- Genus: Pelosia
- Species: P. noctis

Binomial name
- Pelosia noctis (Butler, 1881)

Synonyms
- Gampola noctis Butler, 1881; Paida obtrita Staudinger, 1887

Species of moth

Pelosia noctis is a moth of the subfamily Arctiinae. It was described by Arthur Gardiner Butler in 1881. It is found in the Russian Far East (Middle Amur, Primorye, Sakhalin, Kunashir), Korea, China (Liaonin, Jiangsu, Shaanxi) and Japan.
