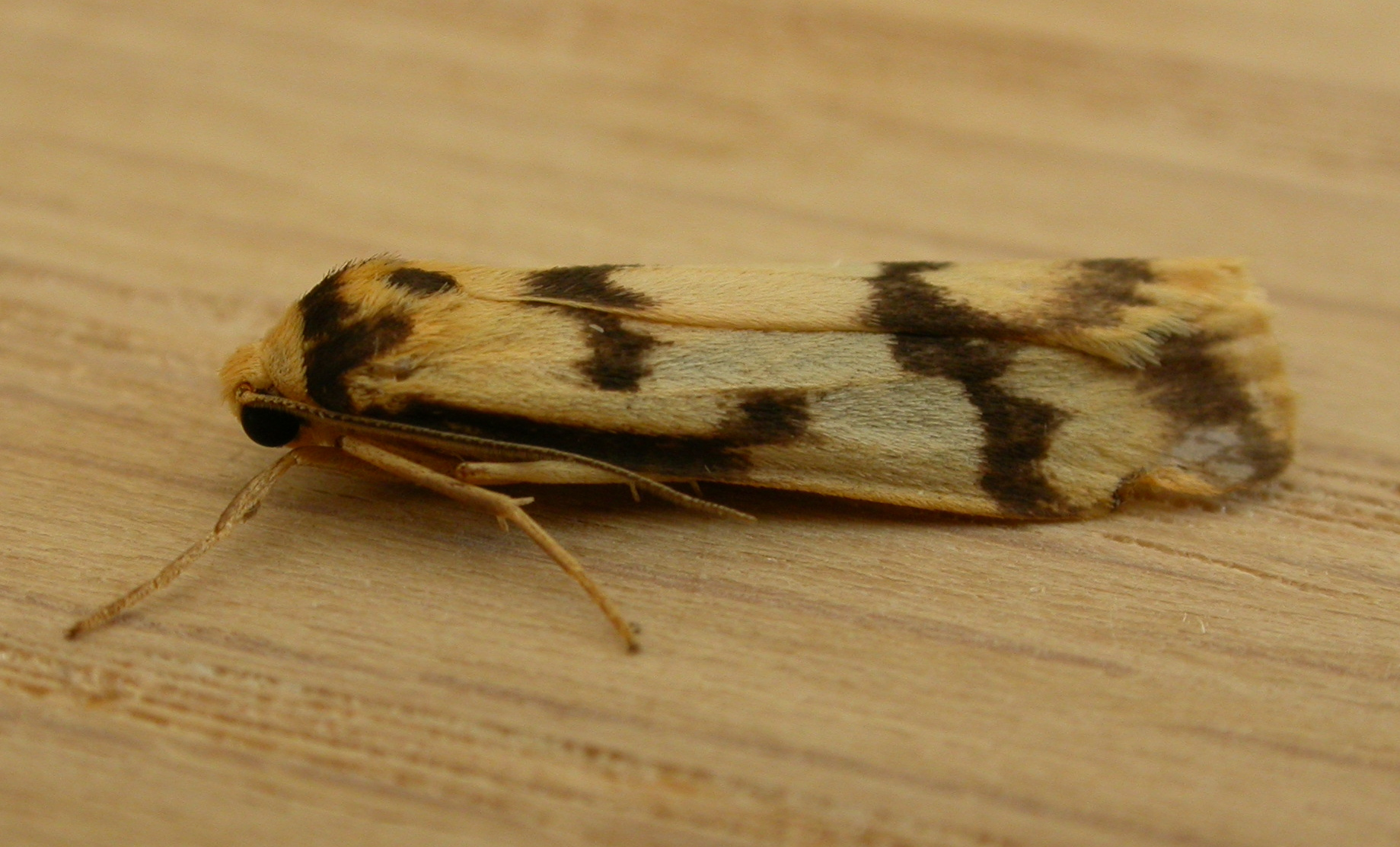

Scientific classification
- Kingdom: Animalia
- Phylum: Arthropoda
- Class: Insecta
- Order: Lepidoptera
- Superfamily: Noctuoidea
- Family: Erebidae
- Subfamily: Arctiinae
- Genus: Tigrioides
- Species: T. alterna

Binomial name
- Tigrioides alterna (Walker, 1854)

Synonyms
- Setina alterna Walker, 1854; Lithosia histrionica Herrich-Schäffer, [1855]; Lithosia transversa Walker, [1865]

= Tigrioides alterna =

Species of moth

Tigrioides alterna is a moth of the family Erebidae first described by Francis Walker in 1854. It is found in Australia.
