= Danielithosia consimilis =

Scientific classification
- Kingdom: Animalia
- Phylum: Arthropoda
- Clade: Pancrustacea
- Class: Insecta
- Order: Lepidoptera
- Superfamily: Noctuoidea
- Family: Erebidae
- Subfamily: Arctiinae
- Genus: Danielithosia
- Species: D. consimilis

Binomial name
- Danielithosia consimilis Dubatolov, Kishida & Wang, 2012

Species of moth

Danielithosia consimilis is a moth of the family Erebidae. It is found in China (Guangdong).

The length of the forewings is about 10 millimetres (0.39 in).
