= Pusiola celida =

Scientific classification
- Domain: Eukaryota
- Kingdom: Animalia
- Phylum: Arthropoda
- Class: Insecta
- Order: Lepidoptera
- Superfamily: Noctuoidea
- Family: Erebidae
- Subfamily: Arctiinae
- Genus: Pusiola
- Species: P. celida

Binomial name
- Pusiola celida (Bethune-Baker, 1911)

Synonyms
- Ilema celida Bethune-Baker, 1911; Pusiola celidana Strand, 1912; Pusiola unipunctata maior Durante & Panzera, 2002; Phryganopsis unipunctana Strand, 1912

Species of moth

Pusiola celida is a moth in the subfamily Arctiinae. It was described by George Thomas Bethune-Baker in 1911. It is found in Angola, Cameroon, the Democratic Republic of the Congo, Equatorial Guinea, Ghana, Guinea, Nigeria, Sierra Leone and Uganda.
