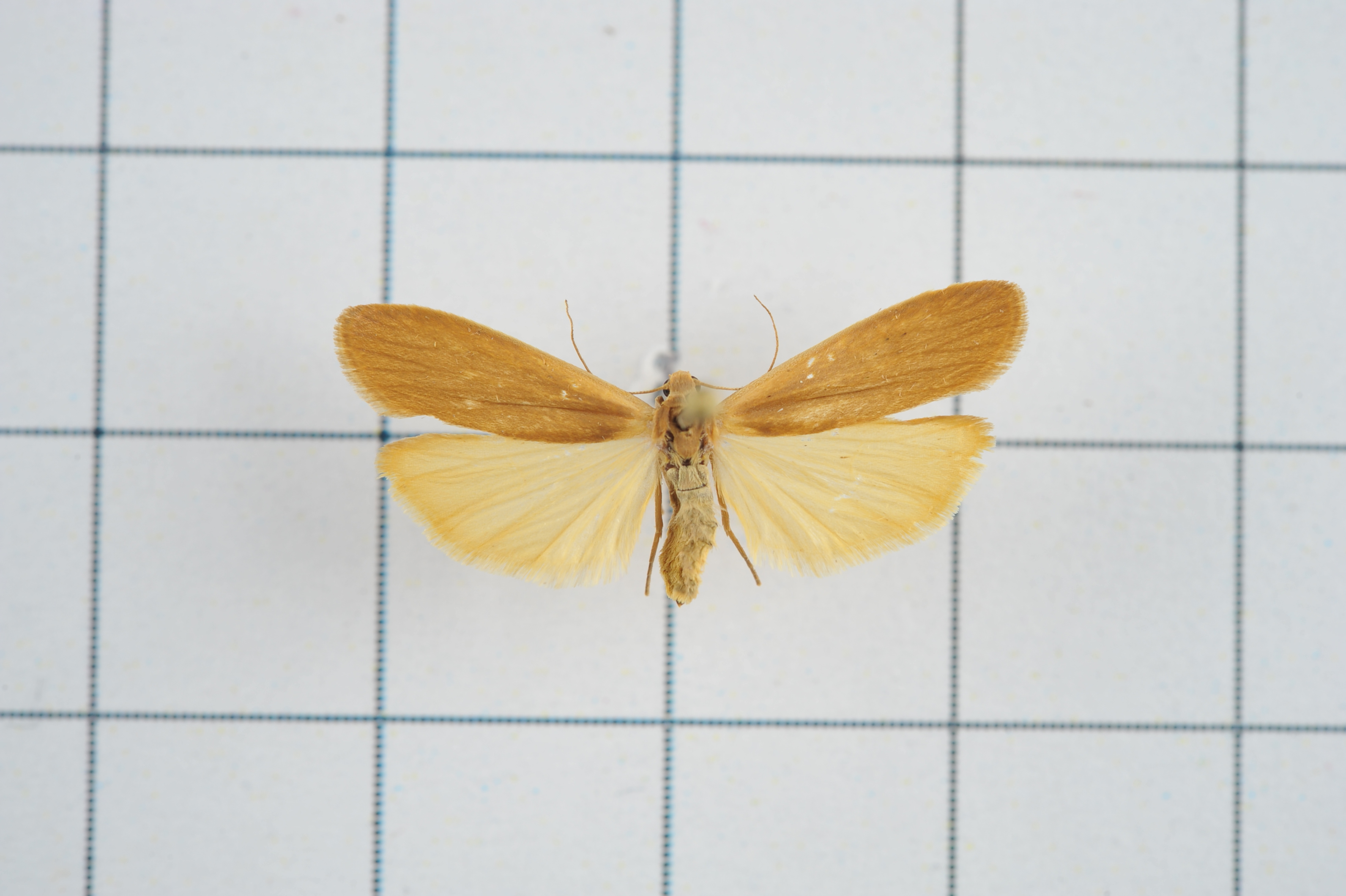

Scientific classification
- Kingdom: Animalia
- Phylum: Arthropoda
- Clade: Pancrustacea
- Class: Insecta
- Order: Lepidoptera
- Superfamily: Noctuoidea
- Family: Erebidae
- Subfamily: Arctiinae
- Genus: Tigrioides
- Species: T. dimidiata

Binomial name
- Tigrioides dimidiata Matsumura, 1927

= Tigrioides dimidiata =

Species of moth

Tigrioides dimidiata is a moth in the family Erebidae. It was described by Shōnen Matsumura in 1927. It is found in Taiwan.
