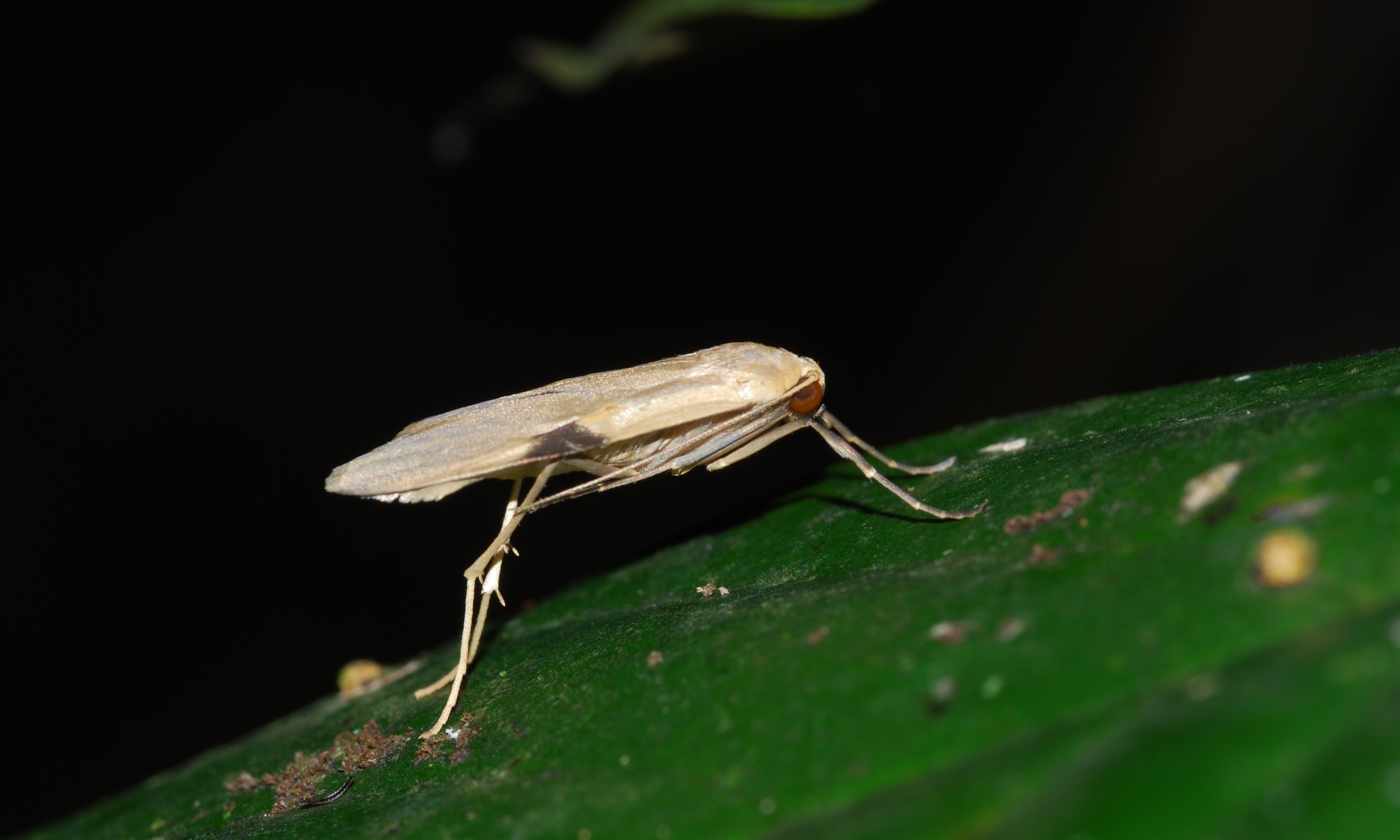
- Macotasa orientalis

Scientific classification
- Domain: Eukaryota
- Kingdom: Animalia
- Phylum: Arthropoda
- Class: Insecta
- Order: Lepidoptera
- Superfamily: Noctuoidea
- Family: Erebidae
- Subfamily: Arctiinae
- Subtribe: Lithosiina
- Genus: Macotasa; Moore, [1878]

= Macotasa =

Genus of moths

Macotasa is a genus of moths in the family Erebidae. The genus was erected by Frederic Moore in 1878.

== Species ==
- Macotasa biplagella (Butler, 1877)
- Macotasa lacrima (Černý, 2009) per Bucsek 2017: may be dubious.
- Macotasa nedoshivinae Dubatolov, 2012
- Macotasa nubecula (Moore, 1879)
- Macotasa nubeculoides Holloway, 1982
- Macotasa suffusus (Talbot, 1926)
- Macotasa sumatrana Dubatolov & Bucsek, 2014
- Macotasa tortricoides (Walker, 1862)
- Macotasa tortricula Singh & Kirti, 2016

Else see similarly named Macohasa for former species:
Macotasa dimorpha (Hampson, 1918) => Macohasa dimorpha (Černý, 2009)
Macotasa tetraspila Černý, 2009 => Macohasa tetraspila (Černý, 2009)
Macotasa orientalis (Hampson, 1905) => Macohasa orientalis (Hampson, 1905)
plus see Macohasa cernyi Dubatolov, Volynkin & Kishida, sp. nov.
