= Pusiola edwardsi =

Scientific classification
- Domain: Eukaryota
- Kingdom: Animalia
- Phylum: Arthropoda
- Class: Insecta
- Order: Lepidoptera
- Superfamily: Noctuoidea
- Family: Erebidae
- Subfamily: Arctiinae
- Genus: Pusiola
- Species: P. edwardsi

Binomial name
- Pusiola edwardsi (Kiriakoff, 1958)

Synonyms
- Phryganopsis edwardsi Kiriakoff, 1958

Species of moth

Pusiola edwardsi is a moth in the subfamily Arctiinae. It was described by Sergius G. Kiriakoff in 1958. It is found in Uganda.
