= Pusiola ochreata =

Scientific classification
- Kingdom: Animalia
- Phylum: Arthropoda
- Class: Insecta
- Order: Lepidoptera
- Superfamily: Noctuoidea
- Family: Erebidae
- Subfamily: Arctiinae
- Genus: Pusiola
- Species: P. ochreata

Binomial name
- Pusiola ochreata (Hampson, 1901)

Synonyms
- Phryganopsis ochreata Hampson, 1901

Species of moth

Pusiola ochreata is a moth in the subfamily Arctiinae. It was described by George Hampson in 1901. It is found in the Democratic Republic of the Congo, Kenya and Malawi.
