= Pusiola ampla =

Scientific classification
- Kingdom: Animalia
- Phylum: Arthropoda
- Class: Insecta
- Order: Lepidoptera
- Superfamily: Noctuoidea
- Family: Erebidae
- Subfamily: Arctiinae
- Genus: Pusiola
- Species: P. ampla

Binomial name
- Pusiola ampla (Debauche, 1942)

Synonyms
- Phryganopsis ampla Debauche, 1942

Species of moth

Pusiola ampla is a moth in the subfamily Arctiinae. It was described by Hubert Robert Debauche in 1942. It is found in the Democratic Republic of the Congo.
