= Tigrioides phaeola =

Scientific classification
- Domain: Eukaryota
- Kingdom: Animalia
- Phylum: Arthropoda
- Class: Insecta
- Order: Lepidoptera
- Superfamily: Noctuoidea
- Family: Erebidae
- Subfamily: Arctiinae
- Genus: Tigrioides
- Species: T. phaeola

Binomial name
- Tigrioides phaeola (Hampson, 1900)

Synonyms
- Lexis phaeola Hampson, 1900

Species of moth

Tigrioides phaeola is a moth in the family Erebidae. It was described by George Hampson in 1900. It is found in Sri Lanka and India (Mumbai).
