= Lepista aposema =

Scientific classification
- Kingdom: Animalia
- Phylum: Arthropoda
- Clade: Pancrustacea
- Class: Insecta
- Order: Lepidoptera
- Superfamily: Noctuoidea
- Family: Erebidae
- Subfamily: Arctiinae
- Genus: Lepista
- Species: L. aposema

Binomial name
- Lepista aposema Kühne, 2010

Synonyms
- Oedipygilema aposema (Kühne, 2010)

Species of moth

Lepista aposema is a moth of the subfamily Arctiinae. It was described by Lars Kühne in 2010. It is found in Mozambique, South Africa, Eswatini and Zimbabwe.
