= Pusiola aureola =

Scientific classification
- Domain: Eukaryota
- Kingdom: Animalia
- Phylum: Arthropoda
- Class: Insecta
- Order: Lepidoptera
- Superfamily: Noctuoidea
- Family: Erebidae
- Subfamily: Arctiinae
- Genus: Pusiola
- Species: P. aureola

Binomial name
- Pusiola aureola Birket-Smith, 1965

Species of moth

Pusiola aureola is a moth in the subfamily Arctiinae. It was described by Sven Jorgen R. Birket-Smith in 1965. It is found in Nigeria.
