= Pelosia hampsoni =

Scientific classification
- Kingdom: Animalia
- Phylum: Arthropoda
- Class: Insecta
- Order: Lepidoptera
- Superfamily: Noctuoidea
- Family: Erebidae
- Subfamily: Arctiinae
- Genus: Pelosia
- Species: P. hampsoni

Binomial name
- Pelosia hampsoni (Toulgoët, 1960)

Synonyms
- Eilema hampsoni Toulgoët, 1960

Species of moth

Pelosia hampsoni is a moth of the family Erebidae first described by Hervé de Toulgoët in 1960. It is found on Madagascar.
