= Pusiola verulama =

Scientific classification
- Kingdom: Animalia
- Phylum: Arthropoda
- Clade: Pancrustacea
- Class: Insecta
- Order: Lepidoptera
- Superfamily: Noctuoidea
- Family: Erebidae
- Subfamily: Arctiinae
- Genus: Pusiola
- Species: P. verulama

Binomial name
- Pusiola verulama (Strand, 1912)

Synonyms
- Eilema verulama Strand, 1912

Species of moth

Pusiola verulama is a moth in the subfamily Arctiinae. It was described by Strand in 1912. It is found in South Africa.
