= Tigrioides aurantiaca =

Scientific classification
- Kingdom: Animalia
- Phylum: Arthropoda
- Class: Insecta
- Order: Lepidoptera
- Superfamily: Noctuoidea
- Family: Erebidae
- Subfamily: Arctiinae
- Genus: Tigrioides
- Species: T. aurantiaca

Binomial name
- Tigrioides aurantiaca Hampson, 1918

Species of moth

Tigrioides aurantiaca is a moth in the family Erebidae. It was described by George Hampson in 1918. It is found in the Philippines.
