= Tigrioides nitens =

Scientific classification
- Kingdom: Animalia
- Phylum: Arthropoda
- Class: Insecta
- Order: Lepidoptera
- Superfamily: Noctuoidea
- Family: Erebidae
- Subfamily: Arctiinae
- Genus: Tigrioides
- Species: T. nitens

Binomial name
- Tigrioides nitens (Walker, [1865])

Synonyms
- Lithosia nitens Walker, [1865]; Lithosia remota Walker, 1869; Lithosia unicolor Lucas, 1890

Species of moth

Tigrioides nitens is a moth in the family Erebidae. It was described by Francis Walker in 1865. It is found in Australia, where it has been recorded from New South Wales, the Northern Territory and Queensland.

The forewings are pale brown.
