= Phryganopsis interstiteola =

Scientific classification
- Kingdom: Animalia
- Phylum: Arthropoda
- Class: Insecta
- Order: Lepidoptera
- Superfamily: Noctuoidea
- Family: Erebidae
- Subfamily: Arctiinae
- Genus: Phryganopsis
- Species: P. interstiteola

Binomial name
- Phryganopsis interstiteola Hampson, 1914

Synonyms
- Pusiola interstiteola (Hampson, 1914)

Species of moth

Phryganopsis interstiteola is a moth in the subfamily Arctiinae. It was described by George Hampson in 1914. It is found in South Africa.
