= Macotasa nedoshivinae =

Scientific classification
- Domain: Eukaryota
- Kingdom: Animalia
- Phylum: Arthropoda
- Class: Insecta
- Order: Lepidoptera
- Superfamily: Noctuoidea
- Family: Erebidae
- Subfamily: Arctiinae
- Genus: Macotasa
- Species: M. nedoshivinae

Binomial name
- Macotasa nedoshivinae Dubatolov, 2012

Species of moth

Macotasa nedoshivinae is a moth of the family Erebidae. It was described by Vladimir Viktorovitch Dubatolov in 2012 and is endemic to Vietnam.

The length of the forewings is 10–12 millimetres (0.39–0.47 in) for males and 12–13 millimetres (0.47–0.51 in) for females.
