= Pusiola nigrifrons =

Scientific classification
- Kingdom: Animalia
- Phylum: Arthropoda
- Class: Insecta
- Order: Lepidoptera
- Superfamily: Noctuoidea
- Family: Erebidae
- Subfamily: Arctiinae
- Genus: Pusiola
- Species: P. nigrifrons

Binomial name
- Pusiola nigrifrons (Hampson, 1900)

Synonyms
- Poliosia nigrifrons Hampson, 1900; Pusiola nigeriana Durante & Panzera, 2002; Pseudopoliosia nigrifrons (Hampson, 1900)

Species of moth

Pusiola nigrifrons is a moth in the subfamily Arctiinae. It was described by George Hampson in 1900. It is found in Cameroon and Nigeria.
