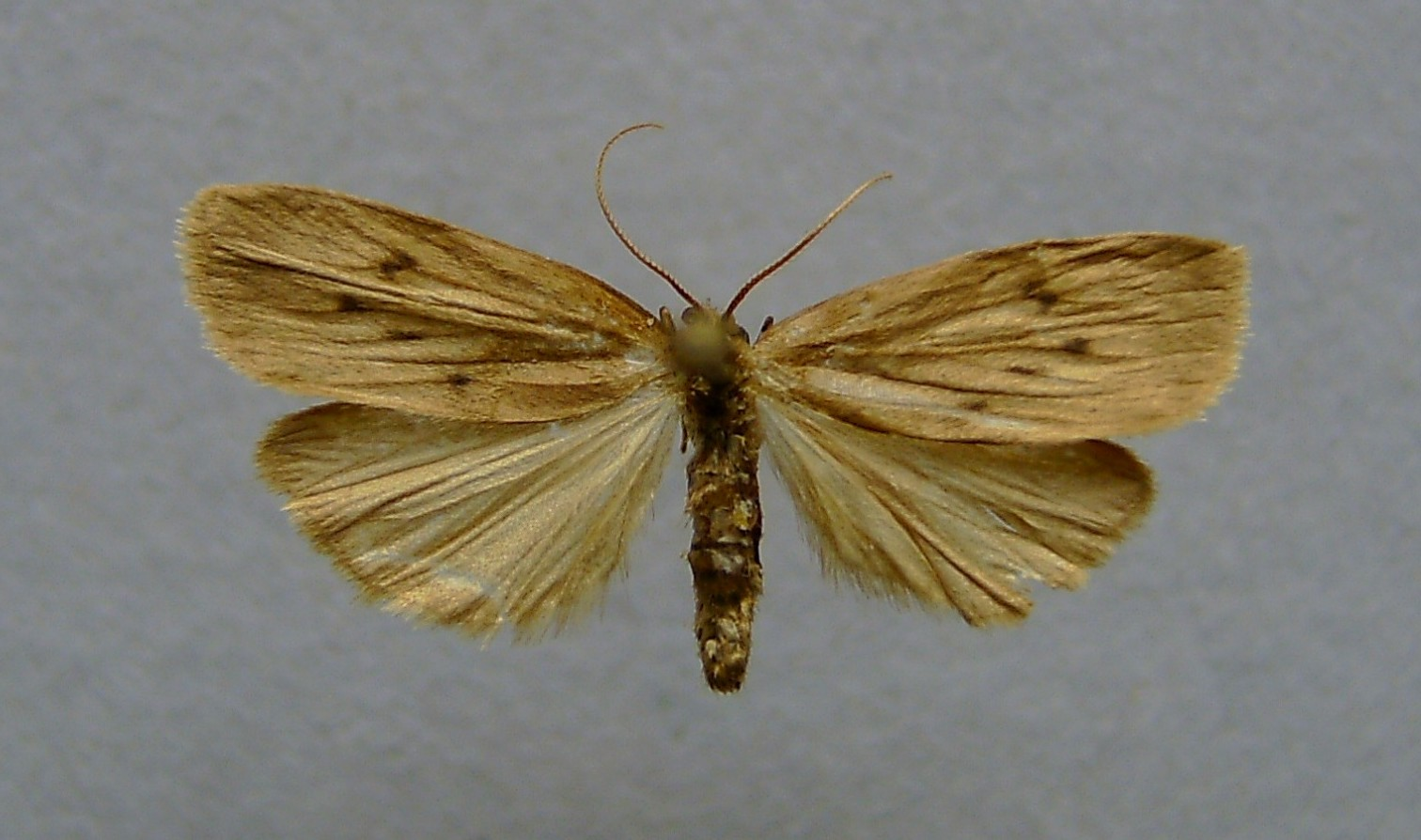

Scientific classification
- Domain: Eukaryota
- Kingdom: Animalia
- Phylum: Arthropoda
- Class: Insecta
- Order: Lepidoptera
- Superfamily: Noctuoidea
- Family: Erebidae
- Subfamily: Arctiinae
- Genus: Pelosia
- Species: P. obtusa

Binomial name
- Pelosia obtusa (Herrich-Schäffer, 1847)

Synonyms
- Paidia obtusa Herrich-Schäffer, [1852]; Paidina obtusa var. sutschana Staudinger, 1892

= Pelosia obtusa =

Species of moth

Pelosia obtusa, the small dotted footman, is a moth of the family Erebidae. The species was first described by Gottlieb August Wilhelm Herrich-Schäffer in 1847. It is found from central Europe through Asia to the Pacific Ocean.

The wingspan is 12–28 mm for males and 16–28 mm for females. There is one generation per year with adults on wing from April to August.

The larvae feed on moss, algae and lichen. Larvae can be found in late summer. The species overwinters in the larval stage.

== Subspecies ==
- Pelosia obtusa obtusa
- Pelosia obtusa pavlasi Witt, 1984 (Spain)
- Pelosia obtusa sutschana (Staudinger, 1892) (Amur, Primorye, Heilongjiang, Japan)
- Pelosia obtusa taurica Daniel, 1939
- Pelosia obtusa uniformis Rothschild, 1921
