= Pusiola leiodes =

Scientific classification
- Kingdom: Animalia
- Phylum: Arthropoda
- Class: Insecta
- Order: Lepidoptera
- Superfamily: Noctuoidea
- Family: Erebidae
- Subfamily: Arctiinae
- Genus: Pusiola
- Species: P. leiodes

Binomial name
- Pusiola leiodes (Kiriakoff, 1954)

Synonyms
- Eilema leiodes Kiriakoff, 1954; Phryganopsis tocha Kiriakoff, 1954

Species of moth

Pusiola leiodes is a moth in the subfamily Arctiinae. It was described by Sergius G. Kiriakoff in 1954. It is found in the Democratic Republic of the Congo.
