= Danielithosia difficilis =

Scientific classification
- Kingdom: Animalia
- Phylum: Arthropoda
- Clade: Pancrustacea
- Class: Insecta
- Order: Lepidoptera
- Superfamily: Noctuoidea
- Family: Erebidae
- Subfamily: Arctiinae
- Genus: Danielithosia
- Species: D. difficilis

Binomial name
- Danielithosia difficilis Dubatolov, Kishida & Wang, 2012

Species of moth

Danielithosia difficilis is a moth of the family Erebidae. It is found in China (Guangdong).

The length of the forewings is about 11 millimetres (0.43 in).
