= Danielithosia milina =

Scientific classification
- Kingdom: Animalia
- Phylum: Arthropoda
- Clade: Pancrustacea
- Class: Insecta
- Order: Lepidoptera
- Superfamily: Noctuoidea
- Family: Erebidae
- Subfamily: Arctiinae
- Genus: Danielithosia
- Species: D. milina

Binomial name
- Danielithosia milina (Fang, 1982)

Synonyms
- Eilema milina Fang, 1982

Species of moth

Danielithosia milina is a moth of the family Erebidae. It is found in Tibet, China.
