= Pusiola straminea =

Scientific classification
- Kingdom: Animalia
- Phylum: Arthropoda
- Class: Insecta
- Order: Lepidoptera
- Superfamily: Noctuoidea
- Family: Erebidae
- Subfamily: Arctiinae
- Genus: Pusiola
- Species: P. straminea

Binomial name
- Pusiola straminea (Hampson, 1901)

Synonyms
- Phryganopsis straminea Hampson, 1901

Species of moth

Pusiola straminea is a moth in the subfamily Arctiinae. It was described by George Hampson in 1901. It is found in the Democratic Republic of the Congo, Kenya, Rwanda and Uganda.
