= Phryganopsis cinerella =

Scientific classification
- Kingdom: Animalia
- Phylum: Arthropoda
- Class: Insecta
- Order: Lepidoptera
- Superfamily: Noctuoidea
- Family: Erebidae
- Subfamily: Arctiinae
- Genus: Phryganopsis
- Species: P. cinerella

Binomial name
- Phryganopsis cinerella (Wallengren, 1860)

Synonyms
- Lithosia cinerella Wallengren, 1860; Pusiola zelleri Wallengren, 1863

Species of moth

Phryganopsis cinerella is a moth in the subfamily Arctiinae. It was described by Wallengren in 1860. It is found in Kenya, Mozambique, Niger, Nigeria, Sierra Leone, South Africa and Zimbabwe.
