= Pusiola derelicta =

Scientific classification
- Domain: Eukaryota
- Kingdom: Animalia
- Phylum: Arthropoda
- Class: Insecta
- Order: Lepidoptera
- Superfamily: Noctuoidea
- Family: Erebidae
- Subfamily: Arctiinae
- Genus: Pusiola
- Species: P. derelicta

Binomial name
- Pusiola derelicta (Debauche, 1942)

Synonyms
- Phryganopsis derelicta Debauche, 1942; Archithosia derelicta (Debauche, 1942)

Species of moth

Pusiola derelicta is a moth in the subfamily Arctiinae. It was described by Hubert Robert Debauche in 1942. It is found in the Democratic Republic of the Congo and Uganda.
