= Tigrioides puncticollis =

Scientific classification
- Domain: Eukaryota
- Kingdom: Animalia
- Phylum: Arthropoda
- Class: Insecta
- Order: Lepidoptera
- Superfamily: Noctuoidea
- Family: Erebidae
- Subfamily: Arctiinae
- Genus: Tigrioides
- Species: T. puncticollis

Binomial name
- Tigrioides puncticollis (Butler, 1877)

Synonyms
- Lithosia puncticollis Butler, 1877

Species of moth

Tigrioides puncticollis is a moth in the family Erebidae. It was described by Arthur Gardiner Butler in 1877. It is found on Borneo, Java, Bali and Lombok. The habitat consists of lower montane forests and lowland forests.

The larvae feed on mosses. They are short, dark and very hairy.
