= Pusiola holoxantha =

Scientific classification
- Kingdom: Animalia
- Phylum: Arthropoda
- Class: Insecta
- Order: Lepidoptera
- Superfamily: Noctuoidea
- Family: Erebidae
- Subfamily: Arctiinae
- Genus: Pusiola
- Species: P. holoxantha

Binomial name
- Pusiola holoxantha (Hampson, 1918)

Synonyms
- Phryganopsis holoxantha Hampson, 1918; Chiperoneia holoxantha (Hampson, 1918)

Species of moth

Pusiola holoxantha is a moth in the subfamily Arctiinae. It was described by George Hampson in 1918. It is found in Malawi and Mozambique.
