= Pelosia meloui =

Scientific classification
- Kingdom: Animalia
- Phylum: Arthropoda
- Class: Insecta
- Order: Lepidoptera
- Superfamily: Noctuoidea
- Family: Erebidae
- Subfamily: Arctiinae
- Genus: Pelosia
- Species: P. meloui

Binomial name
- Pelosia meloui (Toulgoët, 1956)

Synonyms
- Eilema meloui Toulgoët, 1956

Species of moth

Pelosia meloui is a moth of the family Erebidae first described by Hervé de Toulgoët in 1956. It is found on Madagascar.
