= Danielithosia hoenei =

Scientific classification
- Kingdom: Animalia
- Phylum: Arthropoda
- Clade: Pancrustacea
- Class: Insecta
- Order: Lepidoptera
- Superfamily: Noctuoidea
- Family: Erebidae
- Subfamily: Arctiinae
- Genus: Danielithosia
- Species: D. hoenei

Binomial name
- Danielithosia hoenei Dubatolov, 2013

Species of moth

Danielithosia hoenei is a moth of the family Erebidae. It is found in Cambodia, China (Hunan, Fujian), Thailand and Vietnam.

The length of the forewings is 7–9 mm for males and 8–10.5 mm for females.
