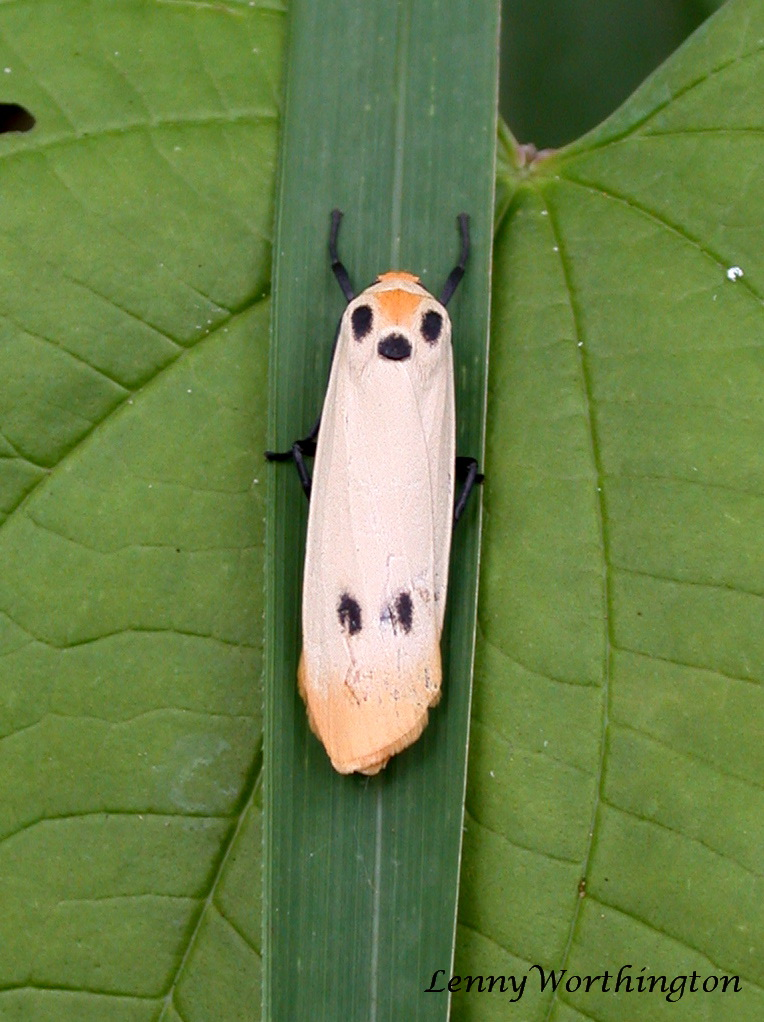

Scientific classification
- Domain: Eukaryota
- Kingdom: Animalia
- Phylum: Arthropoda
- Class: Insecta
- Order: Lepidoptera
- Superfamily: Noctuoidea
- Family: Erebidae
- Subfamily: Arctiinae
- Genus: Tigrioides
- Species: T. euchana

Binomial name
- Tigrioides euchana (C. Swinhoe, 1893)

Synonyms
- Pelosia euchana C. Swinhoe, 1893; Pelosa tetrasema Meyrick, 1894

= Tigrioides euchana =

Species of moth

Tigrioides euchana is a moth in the family Erebidae. It was described by Charles Swinhoe in 1893. It is found in Myanmar.
