= Macotasa tortricoides =

Scientific classification
- Kingdom: Animalia
- Phylum: Arthropoda
- Class: Insecta
- Order: Lepidoptera
- Superfamily: Noctuoidea
- Family: Erebidae
- Subfamily: Arctiinae
- Genus: Macotasa
- Species: M. tortricoides

Binomial name
- Macotasa tortricoides (Walker, 1862)

Synonyms
- Lithosia tortricoides Walker, 1862; Eilema tortricoides

Species of moth

Macotasa tortricoides is a moth of the family Erebidae. It is found on Borneo. The habitat consists of lowland areas.
