= Macotasa tetraspila =

Scientific classification
- Domain: Eukaryota
- Kingdom: Animalia
- Phylum: Arthropoda
- Class: Insecta
- Order: Lepidoptera
- Superfamily: Noctuoidea
- Family: Erebidae
- Subfamily: Arctiinae
- Genus: Macotasa
- Species: M. tetraspila

Binomial name
- Macotasa tetraspila Cerny, 2009

Species of moth

Macotasa tetraspila is a moth of the family Erebidae. It is found in Thailand.
