= Phryganopsis subasperatella =

Scientific classification
- Domain: Eukaryota
- Kingdom: Animalia
- Phylum: Arthropoda
- Class: Insecta
- Order: Lepidoptera
- Superfamily: Noctuoidea
- Family: Erebidae
- Subfamily: Arctiinae
- Genus: Phryganopsis
- Species: P. subasperatella

Binomial name
- Phryganopsis subasperatella Strand, 1912

Species of moth

Phryganopsis subasperatella is a moth in the subfamily Arctiinae. It was described by Strand in 1912. It is found in South Africa.
