= Tigrioides schraderi =

Scientific classification
- Kingdom: Animalia
- Phylum: Arthropoda
- Class: Insecta
- Order: Lepidoptera
- Superfamily: Noctuoidea
- Family: Erebidae
- Subfamily: Arctiinae
- Genus: Tigrioides
- Species: T. schraderi

Binomial name
- Tigrioides schraderi Gaede, 1925

Species of moth

Tigrioides schraderi is a moth in the family Erebidae. It was described by Max Gaede in 1925. It is found in New Guinea, where it is found in Papua New Guinea and the Pass Valley in the Jayawijaya Mountains in Papua.
