= Tigrioides soror =

Scientific classification
- Domain: Eukaryota
- Kingdom: Animalia
- Phylum: Arthropoda
- Class: Insecta
- Order: Lepidoptera
- Superfamily: Noctuoidea
- Family: Erebidae
- Subfamily: Arctiinae
- Genus: Tigrioides
- Species: T. soror

Binomial name
- Tigrioides soror Schaus, 1922

Species of moth

Tigrioides soror is a moth in the family Erebidae. It was described by Schaus in 1922. It is found on Java.
