= Danielithosia =

Scientific classification
- Kingdom: Animalia
- Phylum: Arthropoda
- Clade: Pancrustacea
- Class: Insecta
- Order: Lepidoptera
- Superfamily: Noctuoidea
- Family: Erebidae
- Subfamily: Arctiinae
- Subtribe: Lithosiina
- Genus: Danielithosia; Dubatolov & Kishida, 2012

Genus of moths

Danielithosia is a genus of tiger moths in the family Erebidae.

== Species ==
- Danielithosia aureolata (Daniel, 1954)
- Danielithosia consimilis Dubatolov, Kishida & Wang, 2012
- Danielithosia difficilis Dubatolov, Kishida & Wang, 2012
- Danielithosia fuscipennis Dubatolov, Kishida & Wang, 2012
- Danielithosia hoenei Dubatolov, 2013
- Danielithosia immaculata (Butler, 1880)
- Danielithosia limayca (Daniel, 1954)
- Danielithosia mesospila (Fang, 2000)
- Danielithosia milina (Fang, 1982)
- Danielithosia pallens (Inoue, 1980)
- Danielithosia zolotuhini Dubatolov, 2012
