= Pelosia ramosula =

Scientific classification
- Domain: Eukaryota
- Kingdom: Animalia
- Phylum: Arthropoda
- Class: Insecta
- Order: Lepidoptera
- Superfamily: Noctuoidea
- Family: Erebidae
- Subfamily: Arctiinae
- Genus: Pelosia
- Species: P. ramosula

Binomial name
- Pelosia ramosula (Staudinger, 1887)

Synonyms
- Lithosia ramosula Staudinger, 1887; Lithosia (Paidina) ramulosa Staudinger, 1887

Species of moth

Pelosia ramosula is a moth of the family Erebidae. It was described by Otto Staudinger in 1887. It is found in the Russian Far East (Middle Amur, Primorye, Sakhalin, Kunashir), China (Jiangsu, Yunan, Fujiang, Guangdong) and Japan.
