= Lepista semiochracea =

Scientific classification
- Kingdom: Animalia
- Phylum: Arthropoda
- Clade: Pancrustacea
- Class: Insecta
- Order: Lepidoptera
- Superfamily: Noctuoidea
- Family: Erebidae
- Subfamily: Arctiinae
- Genus: Lepista
- Species: L. semiochracea

Binomial name
- Lepista semiochracea (Felder, 1874)

Synonyms
- Dyphlebia semiochracea Felder, 1874; Lepista semiochrea Seitz, 1926

Species of moth

Lepista semiochracea is a moth of the subfamily Arctiinae. It was described by Felder in 1874. It is found in South Africa.
