= Pelosia stictigramma =

Scientific classification
- Kingdom: Animalia
- Phylum: Arthropoda
- Class: Insecta
- Order: Lepidoptera
- Superfamily: Noctuoidea
- Family: Erebidae
- Subfamily: Arctiinae
- Genus: Pelosia
- Species: P. stictigramma

Binomial name
- Pelosia stictigramma (Hampson, 1908)

Synonyms
- Ilema stictigramma Hampson, 1908

Species of moth

Pelosia stictigramma is a moth of the family Erebidae. It is found on Mayotte.
