= Tigrioides fulveola =

Scientific classification
- Kingdom: Animalia
- Phylum: Arthropoda
- Class: Insecta
- Order: Lepidoptera
- Superfamily: Noctuoidea
- Family: Erebidae
- Subfamily: Arctiinae
- Genus: Tigrioides
- Species: T. fulveola

Binomial name
- Tigrioides fulveola (Hampson, 1900)

Synonyms
- Lexis fulveola Hampson, 1900

Species of moth

Tigrioides fulveola is a moth in the family Erebidae. It was described by George Hampson in 1900. It is found in Kolkata and Sikkim in India.
