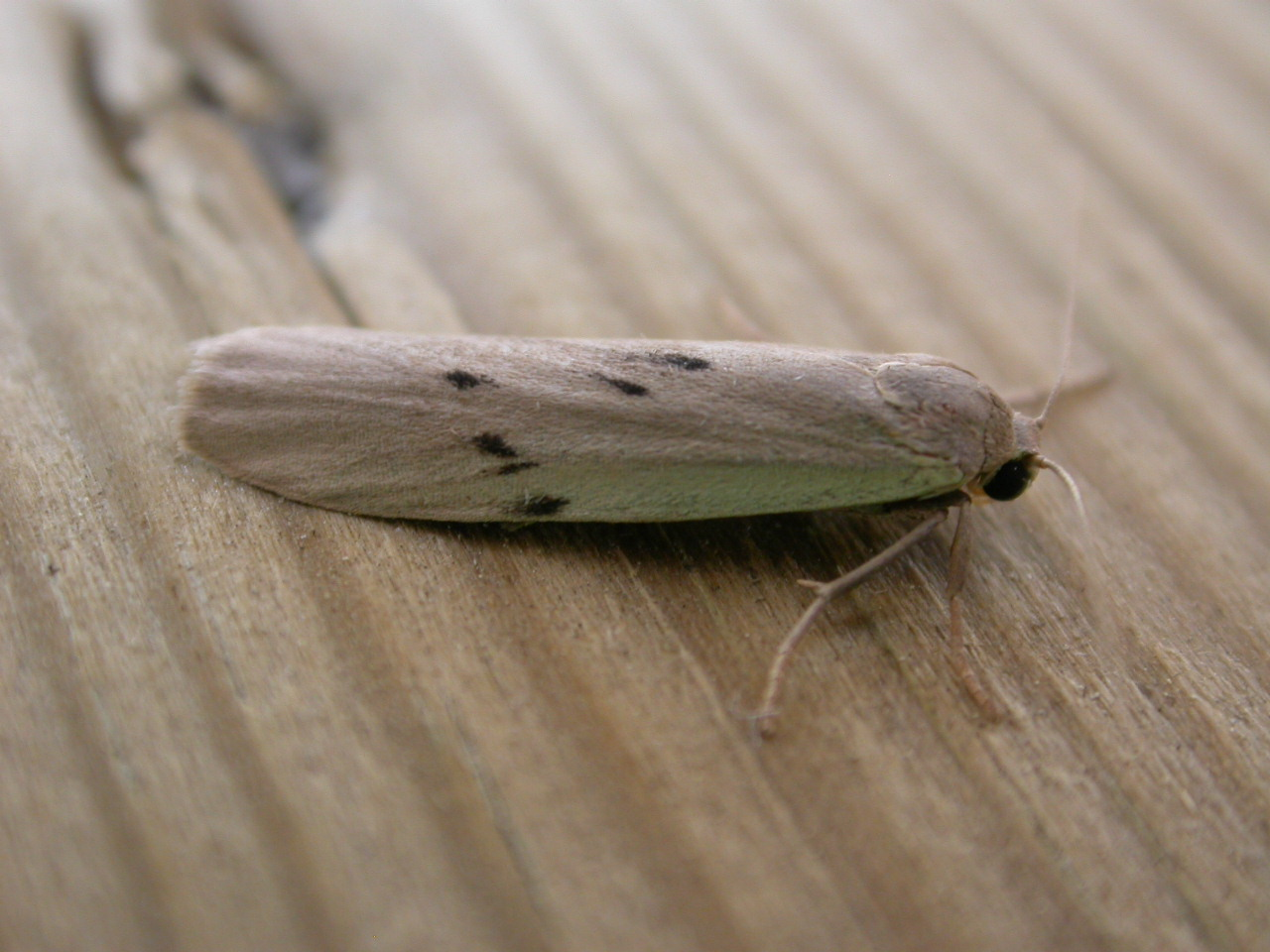

Scientific classification
- Kingdom: Animalia
- Phylum: Arthropoda
- Class: Insecta
- Order: Lepidoptera
- Superfamily: Noctuoidea
- Family: Erebidae
- Subfamily: Arctiinae
- Genus: Pelosia
- Species: P. muscerda

Binomial name
- Pelosia muscerda (Hufnagel, 1766)

= Pelosia muscerda =

Species of moth

Pelosia muscerda, the dotted footman, is a moth of the family Erebidae. The species was first described by Johann Siegfried Hufnagel in 1766. It is found in the Palearctic realm.

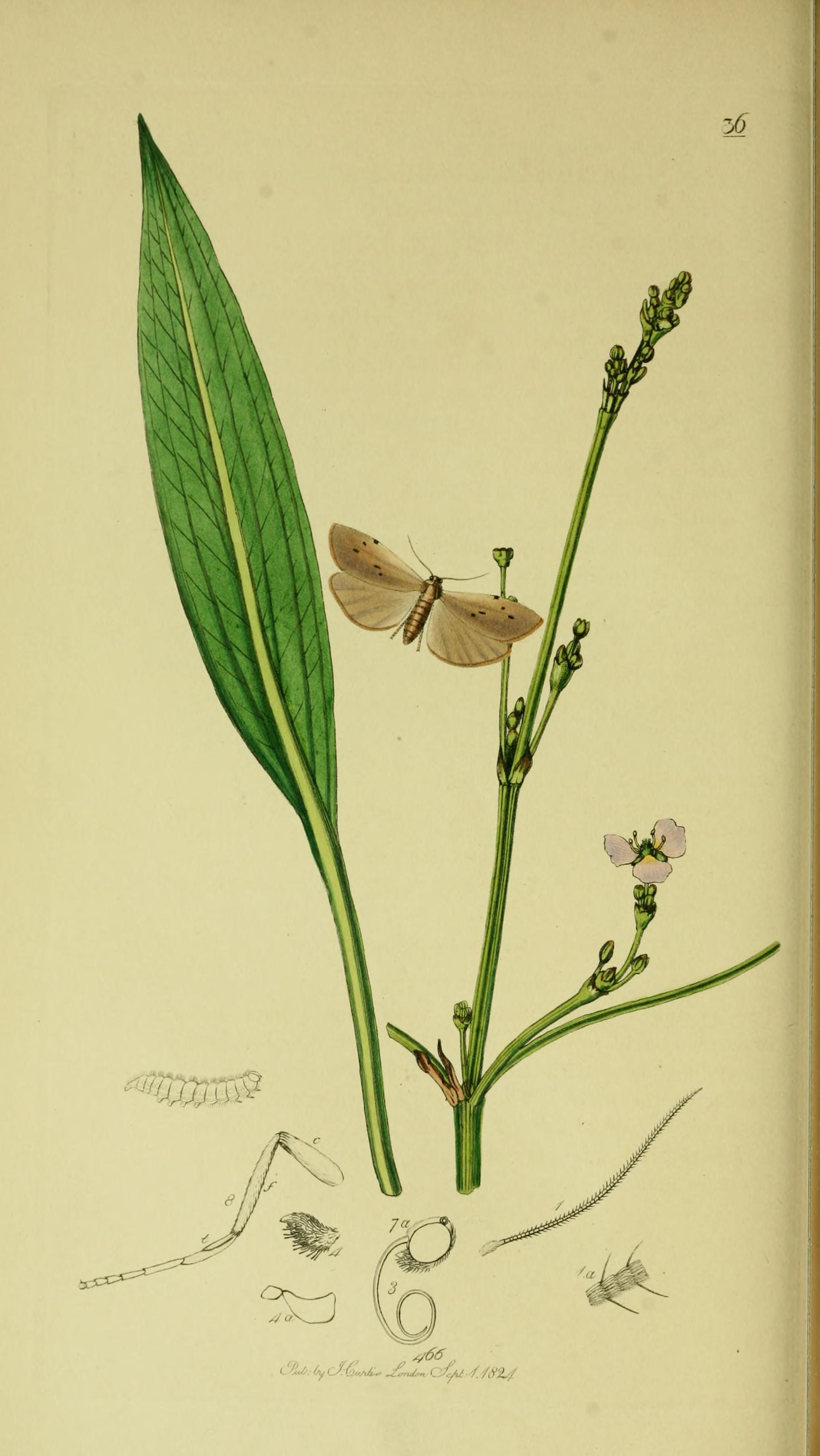
Illustration from John Curtis's British Entomology Volume 5

The wingspan is 24–28 mm. The moth flies from June to September depending on the location.

The larvae feed on lichens and algae.
