= Pusiola curta =

Scientific classification
- Domain: Eukaryota
- Kingdom: Animalia
- Phylum: Arthropoda
- Class: Insecta
- Order: Lepidoptera
- Superfamily: Noctuoidea
- Family: Erebidae
- Subfamily: Arctiinae
- Genus: Pusiola
- Species: P. curta

Binomial name
- Pusiola curta (Rothschild, 1912)

Synonyms
- Onychipoda curta Rothschild, 1912

Species of moth

Pusiola curta is a moth in the subfamily Arctiinae. It was described by Rothschild in 1912. It is found in Angola.
