= Phryganopsis asperatella =

Scientific classification
- Kingdom: Animalia
- Phylum: Arthropoda
- Class: Insecta
- Order: Lepidoptera
- Superfamily: Noctuoidea
- Family: Erebidae
- Subfamily: Arctiinae
- Genus: Phryganopsis
- Species: P. asperatella

Binomial name
- Phryganopsis asperatella (Walker, 1864)

Synonyms
- Lithosia asperatella Walker, 1864

Species of moth

Phryganopsis asperatella is a moth in the subfamily Arctiinae. It was described by Francis Walker in 1864. It is found in Cameroon, Kenya, Niger, Nigeria and South Africa.
