= Phryganopsis punctilineata =

Scientific classification
- Kingdom: Animalia
- Phylum: Arthropoda
- Class: Insecta
- Order: Lepidoptera
- Superfamily: Noctuoidea
- Family: Erebidae
- Subfamily: Arctiinae
- Genus: Phryganopsis
- Species: P. punctilineata

Binomial name
- Phryganopsis punctilineata (Hampson, 1901)

Synonyms
- Ilema punctilineata Hampson, 1901; Eilema taeniata Kiriakoff, 1958

Species of moth

Phryganopsis punctilineata is a moth of the subfamily Arctiinae. It is found in the Democratic Republic of Congo, Ethiopia, Kenya, South Africa and Uganda.
