= Tigrioides kobashayii =

Scientific classification
- Kingdom: Animalia
- Phylum: Arthropoda
- Class: Insecta
- Order: Lepidoptera
- Superfamily: Noctuoidea
- Family: Erebidae
- Subfamily: Arctiinae
- Genus: Tigrioides
- Species: T. kobashayii

Binomial name
- Tigrioides kobashayii Inoue, 1961

Species of moth

Tigrioides kobashayii is a moth in the family Erebidae. It was described by Hiroshi Inoue in 1961. It is found in Japan.
