= Pusiola monotonia =

Scientific classification
- Kingdom: Animalia
- Phylum: Arthropoda
- Class: Insecta
- Order: Lepidoptera
- Superfamily: Noctuoidea
- Family: Erebidae
- Subfamily: Arctiinae
- Genus: Pusiola
- Species: P. monotonia

Binomial name
- Pusiola monotonia (Strand, 1912)

Synonyms
- Phryganopsis monotonia Strand, 1912

Species of moth

Pusiola monotonia is a moth in the subfamily Arctiinae. It was described by Strand in 1912. It is found in Cameroon.
