= Tigrioides grisescens =

Scientific classification
- Domain: Eukaryota
- Kingdom: Animalia
- Phylum: Arthropoda
- Class: Insecta
- Order: Lepidoptera
- Superfamily: Noctuoidea
- Family: Erebidae
- Subfamily: Arctiinae
- Genus: Tigrioides
- Species: T. grisescens

Binomial name
- Tigrioides grisescens (Bethune-Baker, 1908)

Synonyms
- Parapelosia grisescens Bethune-Baker, 1908

Species of moth

Tigrioides grisescens is a moth in the family Erebidae. It was described by George Thomas Bethune-Baker in 1908. It is found in New Guinea, where it is found in Papua New Guinea and the Central Mountain Range in Papua.
