= Pusiola tinaeella =

Scientific classification
- Domain: Eukaryota
- Kingdom: Animalia
- Phylum: Arthropoda
- Class: Insecta
- Order: Lepidoptera
- Superfamily: Noctuoidea
- Family: Erebidae
- Subfamily: Arctiinae
- Genus: Pusiola
- Species: P. tinaeella

Binomial name
- Pusiola tinaeella (Kiriakoff, 1958)

Synonyms
- Phryganopsis tinaeella Kiriakoff, 1958

Species of moth

Pusiola tinaeella is a moth in the subfamily Arctiinae. It was described by Sergius G. Kiriakoff in 1958. It is found in the Democratic Republic of the Congo, Kenya and Uganda.
