= Tigrioides antipulvereola =

Scientific classification
- Kingdom: Animalia
- Phylum: Arthropoda
- Clade: Pancrustacea
- Class: Insecta
- Order: Lepidoptera
- Superfamily: Noctuoidea
- Family: Erebidae
- Subfamily: Arctiinae
- Genus: Tigrioides
- Species: T. antipulvereola

Binomial name
- Tigrioides antipulvereola Holloway, 2001

Species of moth

Tigrioides antipulvereola is a moth in the family Erebidae. It was described by Jeremy Daniel Holloway in 2001. It is found on Borneo. The habitat consists of lower montane forests and lowland forests.

The length of the forewings is about 11 mm.
