= Tigrioides inversa =

Scientific classification
- Domain: Eukaryota
- Kingdom: Animalia
- Phylum: Arthropoda
- Class: Insecta
- Order: Lepidoptera
- Superfamily: Noctuoidea
- Family: Erebidae
- Subfamily: Arctiinae
- Genus: Tigrioides
- Species: T. inversa

Binomial name
- Tigrioides inversa Gaede, 1925

Synonyms
- Tigrioides costaepunctata f. inversa Gaede, 1925

Species of moth

Tigrioides inversa is a moth in the family Erebidae. It was described by Max Gaede in 1925. It is found in New Guinea, where it is found in Papua New Guinea and Papua.
