= Pelosia obtusoides =

Scientific classification
- Kingdom: Animalia
- Phylum: Arthropoda
- Class: Insecta
- Order: Lepidoptera
- Superfamily: Noctuoidea
- Family: Erebidae
- Subfamily: Arctiinae
- Genus: Pelosia
- Species: P. obtusoides

Binomial name
- Pelosia obtusoides (Toulgoët, 1954)

Synonyms
- Eilema obtusoides Toulgoët, 1954; Eilema obtusoides sakalava Toulgoët, 1960

Species of moth

Pelosia obtusoides is a moth of the family Erebidae. It is found on Madagascar.

== Subspecies ==
- Pelosia obtusoides obtusoides
- Pelosia obtusoides sakalava (Toulgoët, 1960)
