= Pelosia angusta =

Scientific classification
- Domain: Eukaryota
- Kingdom: Animalia
- Phylum: Arthropoda
- Class: Insecta
- Order: Lepidoptera
- Superfamily: Noctuoidea
- Family: Erebidae
- Subfamily: Arctiinae
- Genus: Pelosia
- Species: P. angusta

Binomial name
- Pelosia angusta (Staudinger, 1887)

Synonyms
- Paida angusta Staudinger, 1887; Pelosia sachalinensis Matsumura, 1925

Species of moth

Pelosia angusta is a moth of the family Erebidae. It was described by Otto Staudinger in 1887. It is found in the Russian Far East (Middle Amur, Primorye, southern Sakhalin, Kunashir) and Japan.
