= Pusiola flavicosta =

Scientific classification
- Kingdom: Animalia
- Phylum: Arthropoda
- Class: Insecta
- Order: Lepidoptera
- Superfamily: Noctuoidea
- Family: Erebidae
- Subfamily: Arctiinae
- Genus: Pusiola
- Species: P. flavicosta

Binomial name
- Pusiola flavicosta (Wallengren, 1860)

Synonyms
- Lithosia flavicosta Wallengren, 1860

Species of moth

Pusiola flavicosta is a moth in the subfamily Arctiinae. It was described by Wallengren in 1860. It is found in South Africa.
