= Pelosia ankaratrae =

Scientific classification
- Kingdom: Animalia
- Phylum: Arthropoda
- Class: Insecta
- Order: Lepidoptera
- Superfamily: Noctuoidea
- Family: Erebidae
- Subfamily: Arctiinae
- Genus: Pelosia
- Species: P. ankaratrae

Binomial name
- Pelosia ankaratrae (Toulgoët, 1954)

Synonyms
- Eilema ankaratrae Toulgoët, 1954

Species of moth

Pelosia ankaratrae is a moth of the family Erebidae first described by Hervé de Toulgoët in 1954. It is found on Madagascar.
