= Pusiola elongata =

Scientific classification
- Kingdom: Animalia
- Phylum: Arthropoda
- Class: Insecta
- Order: Lepidoptera
- Superfamily: Noctuoidea
- Family: Erebidae
- Subfamily: Arctiinae
- Genus: Pusiola
- Species: P. elongata

Binomial name
- Pusiola elongata (Aurivillius, 1910)

Synonyms
- Phryganopsis elongata Aurivillius, 1910

Species of moth

Pusiola elongata is a moth in the subfamily Arctiinae. It was described by Per Olof Christopher Aurivillius in 1910 and is found in Tanzania.
