= Lepista arabica =

Scientific classification
- Domain: Eukaryota
- Kingdom: Animalia
- Phylum: Arthropoda
- Class: Insecta
- Order: Lepidoptera
- Superfamily: Noctuoidea
- Family: Erebidae
- Subfamily: Arctiinae
- Genus: Lepista
- Species: L. arabica

Binomial name
- Lepista arabica (Rebel, 1907)

Synonyms
- Ilema arabica Rebel, 1907

Species of moth

Lepista arabica is a moth of the subfamily Arctiinae. It was described by Rebel in 1907. It is found in Eritrea, Oman and Yemen.
