= Phryganopsis flavicosta =

Scientific classification
- Kingdom: Animalia
- Phylum: Arthropoda
- Class: Insecta
- Order: Lepidoptera
- Superfamily: Noctuoidea
- Family: Erebidae
- Subfamily: Arctiinae
- Genus: Phryganopsis
- Species: P. flavicosta

Binomial name
- Phryganopsis flavicosta Hampson, 1901

Synonyms
- Ochrotilema flavicosta Hampson, 1901)

Species of moth

Phryganopsis flavicosta is a moth in the subfamily Arctiinae. It was described by George Hampson in 1901. It is found in the Democratic Republic of the Congo and Sierra Leone.
