= Pelosia amaurobapha =

Scientific classification
- Domain: Eukaryota
- Kingdom: Animalia
- Phylum: Arthropoda
- Class: Insecta
- Order: Lepidoptera
- Superfamily: Noctuoidea
- Family: Erebidae
- Subfamily: Arctiinae
- Genus: Pelosia
- Species: P. amaurobapha

Binomial name
- Pelosia amaurobapha (Mabille, 1900)

Synonyms
- Lithosia amaurobapha Mabille, 1900; Eilema amaurobapha

Species of moth

Pelosia amaurobapha is a moth of the family Erebidae. It is found in Madagascar.
