= Phryganopsis angulifascia =

Scientific classification
- Domain: Eukaryota
- Kingdom: Animalia
- Phylum: Arthropoda
- Class: Insecta
- Order: Lepidoptera
- Superfamily: Noctuoidea
- Family: Erebidae
- Subfamily: Arctiinae
- Genus: Phryganopsis
- Species: P. angulifascia

Binomial name
- Phryganopsis angulifascia (Strand, 1912)

Synonyms
- Eilema angulifascia Strand, 1912; Phryganopsis jaundeana Strand, 1912; Ilema fuscicorpus Hampson, 1914

Species of moth

Phryganopsis angulifascia is a moth of the subfamily Arctiinae first described by Embrik Strand in 1912. It is found in western, central and eastern Africa and is known from Ghana, Cameroon, the Democratic Republic of the Congo, Uganda and Kenya.
