= Pusiola squamosa =

Scientific classification
- Kingdom: Animalia
- Phylum: Arthropoda
- Class: Insecta
- Order: Lepidoptera
- Superfamily: Noctuoidea
- Family: Erebidae
- Subfamily: Arctiinae
- Genus: Pusiola
- Species: P. squamosa

Binomial name
- Pusiola squamosa (Bethune-Baker, 1911)

Synonyms
- Ilema squamosa Bethune-Baker, 1911

Species of moth

Pusiola squamosa is a moth in the subfamily Arctiinae. It was described by George Thomas Bethune-Baker in 1911. It is found in Cameroon.
