= Phryganopsis sordida =

Scientific classification
- Domain: Eukaryota
- Kingdom: Animalia
- Phylum: Arthropoda
- Class: Insecta
- Order: Lepidoptera
- Superfamily: Noctuoidea
- Family: Erebidae
- Subfamily: Arctiinae
- Genus: Phryganopsis
- Species: P. sordida

Binomial name
- Phryganopsis sordida Felder, 1874

Species of moth

Phryganopsis sordida is a moth in the subfamily Arctiinae. It was described by Felder in 1874. It is found in South Africa.
