= Danielithosia zolotuhini =

Scientific classification
- Kingdom: Animalia
- Phylum: Arthropoda
- Clade: Pancrustacea
- Class: Insecta
- Order: Lepidoptera
- Superfamily: Noctuoidea
- Family: Erebidae
- Subfamily: Arctiinae
- Genus: Danielithosia
- Species: D. zolotuhini

Binomial name
- Danielithosia zolotuhini Dubatolov, Kishida & Wang, 2012

Species of moth

Danielithosia zolotuhini is a moth of the family Erebidae that is endemic to Vietnam. The species was first described by Vladimir Viktorovitch Dubatolov, Yasunori Kishida and Min Wang in 2012.

The length of the forewings is 10–10.5 millimetres (0.39–0.41 in).
