= Pusiola =

Scientific classification
- Kingdom: Animalia
- Phylum: Arthropoda
- Class: Insecta
- Order: Lepidoptera
- Superfamily: Noctuoidea
- Family: Erebidae
- Subfamily: Arctiinae
- Tribe: Lithosiini
- Genus: Pusiola; Wallengren, 1863

Synonyms
- Pusiolania Strand, 1912

Genus of moths

Pusiola is a genus of moths in the subfamily Arctiinae.

== Species ==
- Pusiola ampla (Debauche, 1942)
- Pusiola aureola Birket-Smith, 1965
- Pusiola celida (Bethune-Baker, 1911)
- Pusiola chota (Swinhoe, 1885)
- Pusiola curta (Rothschild, 1912)
- Pusiola danella Durante & Panzera, 2002
- Pusiola derelicta (Debauche, 1942)
- Pusiola edwardsi (Kiriakoff, 1958)
- Pusiola elongata (Aurivillius, 1910)
- Pusiola fageli (Kiriakoff, 1954)
- Pusiola flavicosta (Wallengren, 1860)
- Pusiola hemiphaea (Hampson, 1909)
- Pusiola holoxantha (Hampson, 1918)
- Pusiola isabellina (Kiriakoff, 1954)
- Pusiola leiodes (Kiriakoff, 1954)
- Pusiola melemona (Kiriakoff, 1963)
- Pusiola minutissima Kiriakoff, 1958
- Pusiola monotonia (Strand, 1912)
- Pusiola nigrifrons (Hampson, 1900)
- Pusiola nyassana (Strand, 1912)
- Pusiola occidentalis (Strand, 1912)
- Pusiola ochreata (Hampson, 1901)
- Pusiola poliosia (Kiriakoff, 1958)
- Pusiola roscidella (Kiriakoff, 1954)
- Pusiola sordidula (Kiriakoff, 1954)
- Pusiola sorghicolor (Kiriakoff, 1954)
- Pusiola squamosa (Bethune-Baker, 1911)
- Pusiola straminea (Hampson, 1901)
- Pusiola theresia (Kiriakoff, 1963)
- Pusiola tinaeella (Kiriakoff, 1958)
- Pusiola unicolor (Kiriakoff, 1954)
- Pusiola verulama (Strand, 1912)
