= Tigrioides pyralina =

Scientific classification
- Domain: Eukaryota
- Kingdom: Animalia
- Phylum: Arthropoda
- Class: Insecta
- Order: Lepidoptera
- Superfamily: Noctuoidea
- Family: Erebidae
- Subfamily: Arctiinae
- Genus: Tigrioides
- Species: T. pyralina

Binomial name
- Tigrioides pyralina (Rothschild, 1912)

Synonyms
- Ilema pyralina Rothschild, 1912

Species of moth

Tigrioides pyralina is a moth in the family Erebidae. It was described by Rothschild in 1912. It is found on Sumbawa.
