= Tigrioides leucanioides =

Scientific classification
- Kingdom: Animalia
- Phylum: Arthropoda
- Class: Insecta
- Order: Lepidoptera
- Superfamily: Noctuoidea
- Family: Erebidae
- Subfamily: Arctiinae
- Genus: Tigrioides
- Species: T. leucanioides

Binomial name
- Tigrioides leucanioides (Walker, 1862)

Synonyms
- Lithosia leucanioides Walker, 1862

Species of moth

Tigrioides leucanioides is a moth in the family Erebidae. It was described by Francis Walker in 1862. It is found in southern Myanmar and on Peninsular Malaysia, Sumatra and Borneo. The habitat consists of lower montane forests and lowland forests, including alluvial forests.

The forewings are straw with blackish lines.
