= Tigrioides chionostola =

Scientific classification
- Kingdom: Animalia
- Phylum: Arthropoda
- Class: Insecta
- Order: Lepidoptera
- Superfamily: Noctuoidea
- Family: Erebidae
- Subfamily: Arctiinae
- Genus: Tigrioides
- Species: T. chionostola

Binomial name
- Tigrioides chionostola Hampson, 1918

Species of moth

Tigrioides chionostola is a moth in the family Erebidae. It was described by George Hampson in 1918. It is found on New Guinea.
