= Pusiola chota =

Scientific classification
- Domain: Eukaryota
- Kingdom: Animalia
- Phylum: Arthropoda
- Class: Insecta
- Order: Lepidoptera
- Superfamily: Noctuoidea
- Family: Erebidae
- Subfamily: Arctiinae
- Genus: Pusiola
- Species: P. chota

Binomial name
- Pusiola chota (C. Swinhoe, 1885)

Synonyms
- Brunia chota C. Swinhoe, 1885

Species of moth

Pusiola chota is a moth in the subfamily Arctiinae. It was described by Charles Swinhoe in 1885. It is found in the Democratic Republic of the Congo, Kenya and India.
