= Phryganopsis plumosa =

Scientific classification
- Domain: Eukaryota
- Kingdom: Animalia
- Phylum: Arthropoda
- Class: Insecta
- Order: Lepidoptera
- Superfamily: Noctuoidea
- Family: Erebidae
- Subfamily: Arctiinae
- Genus: Phryganopsis
- Species: P. plumosa

Binomial name
- Phryganopsis plumosa Mabille, 1900

Synonyms
- Pelosia hispanica Witt, 1979; Pelosia plumosa (Mabille, 1900); Phryganopsis unipuncta Hampson, 1905

Species of moth

Phryganopsis plumosa is a moth of the subfamily Arctiinae first described by Paul Mabille in 1900. It is found in the Democratic Republic of the Congo, Malawi, Madagascar, South Africa, Algeria. and southern Spain.

The holotype was collected in 1898 in Madagascar's Antongil Bay by A. Mocquerys.
