= Pusiola minutissima =

Scientific classification
- Domain: Eukaryota
- Kingdom: Animalia
- Phylum: Arthropoda
- Class: Insecta
- Order: Lepidoptera
- Superfamily: Noctuoidea
- Family: Erebidae
- Subfamily: Arctiinae
- Genus: Pusiola
- Species: P. minutissima

Binomial name
- Pusiola minutissima (Kiriakoff, 1958)

Synonyms
- Phryganopsis minutissima Kiriakoff, 1958; Pelosia nitedula Durante & Panzera, 2002; Pumililema minutissima (Kiriakoff, 1958)

Species of moth

Pusiola minutissima is a moth of the family Erebidae. It was described by Sergius G. Kiriakoff in 1958. It is found in Ghana, Kenya, Nigeria and Uganda.
