= Phryganopsis atrescens =

Scientific classification
- Kingdom: Animalia
- Phylum: Arthropoda
- Class: Insecta
- Order: Lepidoptera
- Superfamily: Noctuoidea
- Family: Erebidae
- Subfamily: Arctiinae
- Genus: Phryganopsis
- Species: P. atrescens

Binomial name
- Phryganopsis atrescens Hampson, 1903

Synonyms
- Lepista atrescens

Species of moth

Phryganopsis atrescens is a moth of the subfamily Arctiinae. It was described by George Hampson in 1903. It is found in the Eastern Cape of South Africa.
