= Danielithosia pallens =

Scientific classification
- Kingdom: Animalia
- Phylum: Arthropoda
- Class: Insecta
- Order: Lepidoptera
- Superfamily: Noctuoidea
- Family: Erebidae
- Subfamily: Arctiinae
- Genus: Danielithosia
- Species: D. pallens

Binomial name
- Danielithosia pallens (Inoue, 1980)

Synonyms
- Tigrioides pallens Inoue, 1980

Species of moth

Danielithosia pallens is a moth of the family Erebidae. It is found in Japan (Ryukyus).
