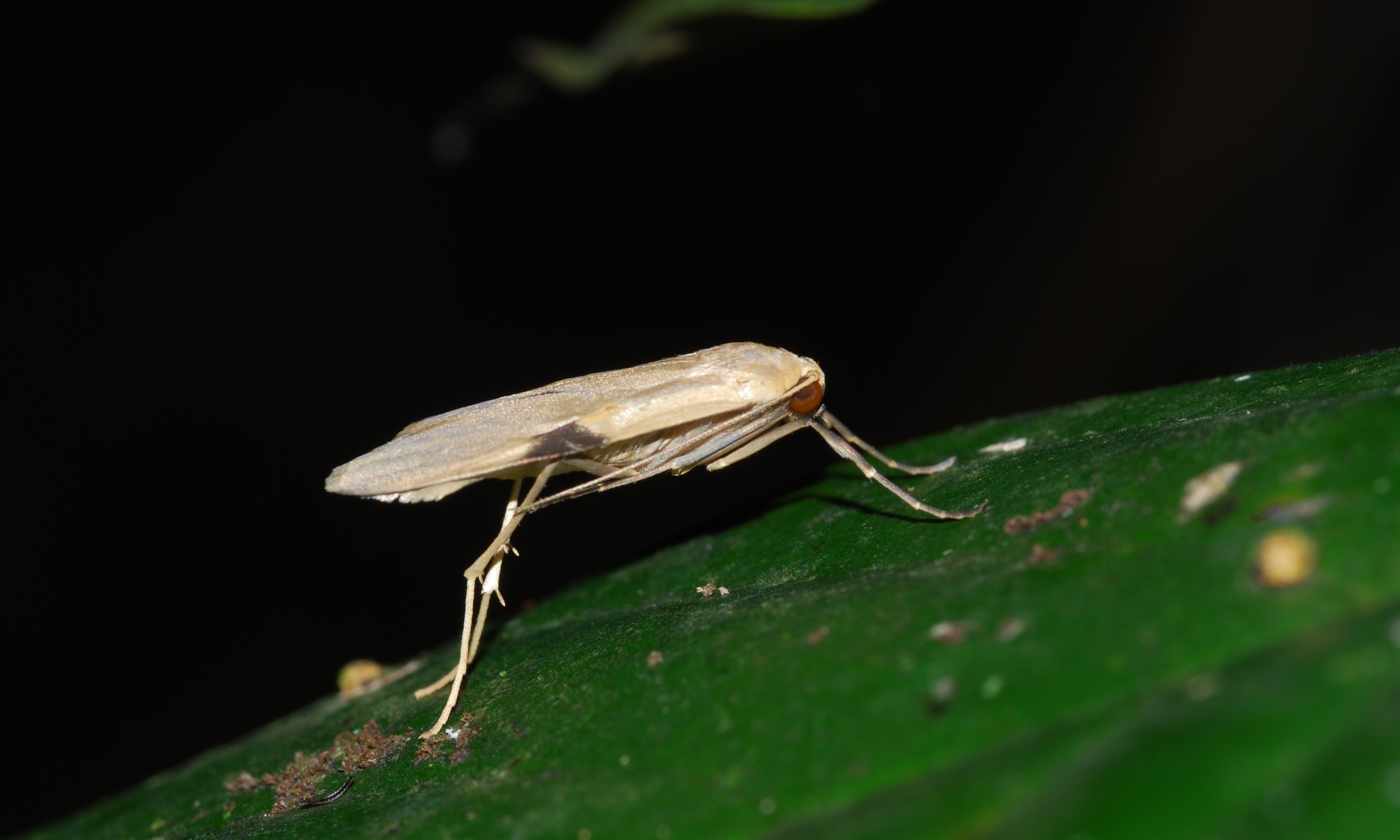

Scientific classification
- Kingdom: Animalia
- Phylum: Arthropoda
- Class: Insecta
- Order: Lepidoptera
- Superfamily: Noctuoidea
- Family: Erebidae
- Subfamily: Arctiinae
- Genus: Macotasa
- Species: M. orientalis

Binomial name
- Macotasa orientalis (Hampson, 1905)

Synonyms
- Phaeosia orientalis Hampson, 1905; Ilema pentaspila Hampson, 1907; Eilema pentaspila

= Macotasa orientalis =

Species of moth

Macotasa orientalis is a moth of the family Erebidae first described by George Hampson in 1905. It is found in Myanmar, China (Fujian, Yunnan), Vietnam, Thailand, Singapore and on Malacca, Sumatra and Borneo.
