= Macotasa suffusus =

Scientific classification
- Domain: Eukaryota
- Kingdom: Animalia
- Phylum: Arthropoda
- Class: Insecta
- Order: Lepidoptera
- Superfamily: Noctuoidea
- Family: Erebidae
- Subfamily: Arctiinae
- Genus: Macotasa
- Species: M. suffusus

Binomial name
- Macotasa suffusus (Talbot, 1926)

Synonyms
- Tigrioides suffusus Talbot, 1926

Species of moth

Macotasa suffusus is a moth of the family Erebidae. It was described by George Talbot in 1926. It is found on Borneo. The habitat consists of lowland to lower montane forest types.
