= Lepista pulverulenta =

Scientific classification
- Domain: Eukaryota
- Kingdom: Animalia
- Phylum: Arthropoda
- Class: Insecta
- Order: Lepidoptera
- Superfamily: Noctuoidea
- Family: Erebidae
- Subfamily: Arctiinae
- Genus: Lepista
- Species: L. pulverulenta

Binomial name
- Lepista pulverulenta (T. P. Lucas, 1890)

Synonyms
- Tigriodes pulverulenta Lucas, 1890; Lepista pulverea Hampson, 1914

Species of moth

Lepista pulverulenta is a moth of the subfamily Arctiinae. It was described by Thomas Pennington Lucas in 1890. It is found in Australia, where it has been recorded from Queensland.
