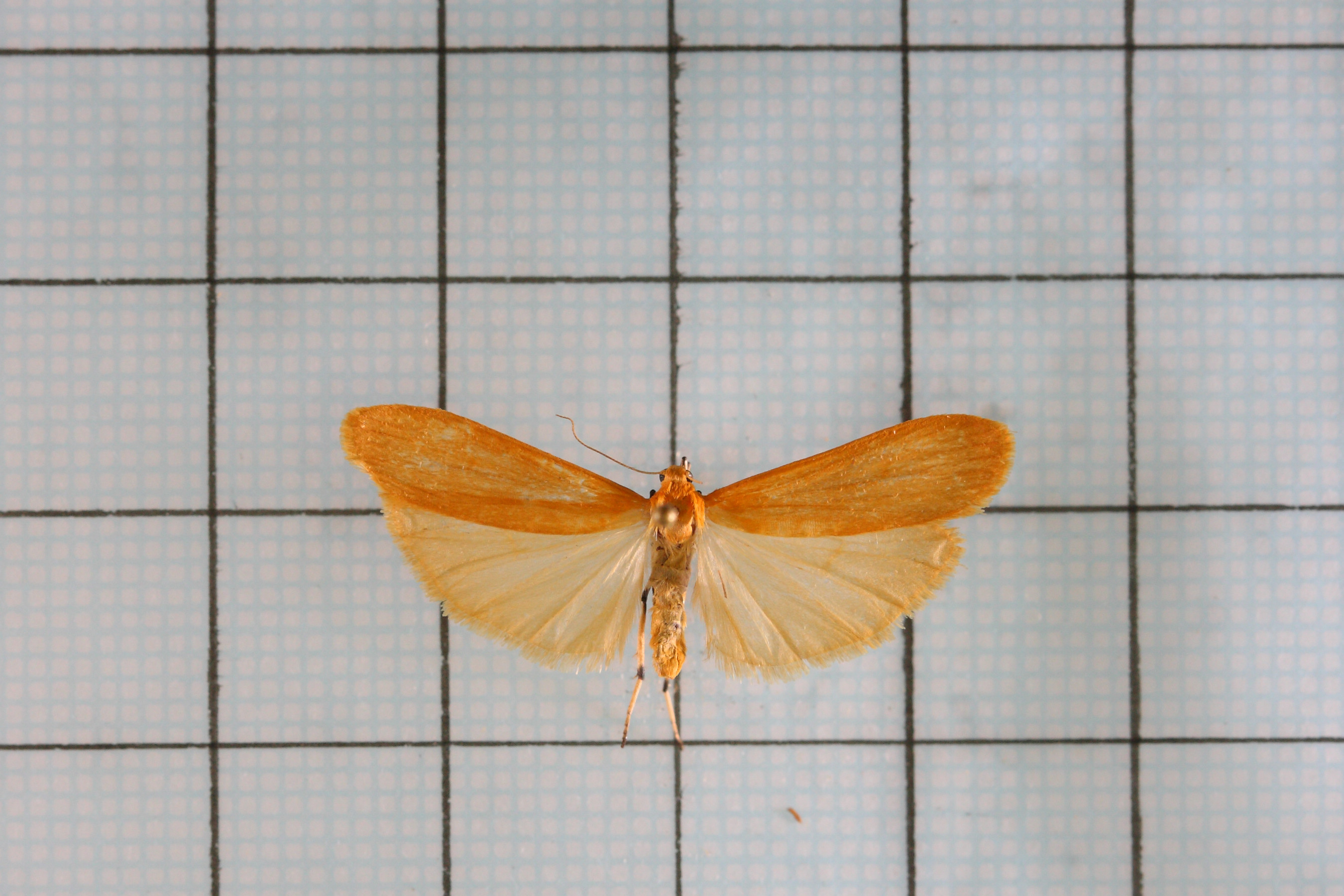

Scientific classification
- Kingdom: Animalia
- Phylum: Arthropoda
- Class: Insecta
- Order: Lepidoptera
- Superfamily: Noctuoidea
- Family: Erebidae
- Subfamily: Arctiinae
- Genus: Danielithosia
- Species: D. immaculata

Binomial name
- Danielithosia immaculata (Butler, 1880)

Synonyms
- Katha immaculata Butler, 1880; Tigrioides immaculata; Tigrioides immaculatus; Tigrioides kobayashi Inoue, 1961

= Danielithosia immaculata =

Species of moth

Danielithosia immaculata is a species of moth of the family Erebidae first described by Arthur Gardiner Butler in 1880. It is found in Japan (Honshu, Kyushu, Shikoku, Ryukyus) and Taiwan. There are also records from Singapore, Bali, China and the Philippines.

The wingspan is 15–20 mm.
