= Pusiola hemiphaea =

Scientific classification
- Kingdom: Animalia
- Phylum: Arthropoda
- Class: Insecta
- Order: Lepidoptera
- Superfamily: Noctuoidea
- Family: Erebidae
- Subfamily: Arctiinae
- Genus: Pusiola
- Species: P. hemiphaea

Binomial name
- Pusiola hemiphaea (Hampson, 1909)

Synonyms
- Phryganopsis hemiphaea Hampson, 1909; Zobida hemiphaea (Hampson, 1909)

Species of moth

Pusiola hemiphaea is a moth in the subfamily Arctiinae. It was described by George Hampson in 1909. It is found in Togo and Uganda.
