= Macotasa dimorpha =

Scientific classification
- Kingdom: Animalia
- Phylum: Arthropoda
- Clade: Pancrustacea
- Class: Insecta
- Order: Lepidoptera
- Superfamily: Noctuoidea
- Family: Erebidae
- Subfamily: Arctiinae
- Genus: Macotasa
- Species: M. dimorpha

Binomial name
- Macotasa dimorpha (Hampson, 1918)

Synonyms
- Phaeosia dimorpha Hampson, 1918

Species of moth

Macotasa dimorpha is a moth of the family Erebidae. It was described by George Hampson in 1918. It is found in the Philippines.
