= Danielithosia aureolata =

Scientific classification
- Domain: Eukaryota
- Kingdom: Animalia
- Phylum: Arthropoda
- Class: Insecta
- Order: Lepidoptera
- Superfamily: Noctuoidea
- Family: Erebidae
- Subfamily: Arctiinae
- Genus: Danielithosia
- Species: D. aureolata

Binomial name
- Danielithosia aureolata (Daniel, 1954)

Synonyms
- Tigrioides aureolata Daniel, 1954

Species of moth

Danielithosia aureolata is a moth of the family Erebidae. It is found in China (Fujian, Sichuan, Zhejiang).
